= List of people executed in Georgia (U.S. state) (pre-1972) =

The following is a list of people executed by the U.S. state of Georgia before 1972, when capital punishment was briefly abolished by the Supreme Court's ruling in Furman v. Georgia. For people executed after the restoration of capital punishment by the Supreme Court's ruling in Gregg v. Georgia (1976), see List of people executed in Georgia.

== Hanging ==
Slave executions

=== 1788-1799 ===
Name	Race	Age	Sex	Date of execution	County	Crime	Victim(s)	Governor
James Meredith	White		M	February 27, 1791	Elbert	Murder		Edward Telfair
Three unknowns	Black		M	February 1, 1794	Chatham	Murder	John Hix, white	George Mathews
Bird	Mixed (Note: Mulatto.)		M	June 11, 1794	Richmond	Horse stealing		George Mathews
Thomas Jones	White		M	March 16, 1795	Burke	Grand larceny		George Mathews
John Robertson	White		M	September 19, 1795	Richmond			George Mathews
Samuel Fowler	White		M	April 27, 1799	Chatham	Murder	Female, white (wife)	James Jackson

=== 1800s ===
Name	Race	Age	Sex	Date of execution	County	Crime	Victim(s)	Governor
Unknown	Black		F	1800	Dade	Murder	Unknown, black (child)	James Jackson
John Rice	White		M	May 20, 1802	Chatham	Grand larceny		Josiah Tattnall
John Randolph	White		M	March 26, 1806	Burke	Murder	Mr. McNorrel, white (sheriff)	John Milledge
Wilks Hill	White		M	May 1806	Lincoln	Horse stealing		John Milledge
Polly Barclay	White		F	May 30, 1806	Wilkes	Conspiracy to murder	Male, white (husband)	John Milledge
Unknown	Black		M	July 1806 (Note: Executed by burning.)	Lincoln	Murder	Mrs. McCorcle, white (owner)	John Milledge
Nelson Tait	White		M	August 25, 1806	Hancock	Forgery-Counterfeiting	(Note: Also confessed to 18 horse thefts.)	John Milledge
Robert Casey	White		M	September 26, 1806	Jasper	Murder	Male, white	Jared Irwin
Isaac Monroe	White		M	September 26, 1806	Jasper	Murder	Male, white	Jared Irwin
Barney Pare	White		M	September 26, 1806	Jasper	Murder	Male, white	Jared Irwin
William Love	White		M	May 13, 1807	Richmond	Murder	David Whittemore, white	Jared Irwin

=== 1810s ===
Name	Race	Age	Sex	Date of execution	County	Crime	Victim(s)	Governor
Billy	Black		M	1810-1811		Slave revolt		David Brydie Mitchell
William Smith	Black		M	September 8, 1810	Chatham	Slave stealing	Female and her child, black	David Brydie Mitchell
John Amos	White		M	December 20, 1811	Richmond	Murder	William Faircloth, white	David Brydie Mitchell
William Beasley	White		M	August 20, 1813 (Note: Executed by firing squad.)	Bibb (Military)	Desertion	N/A	David Brydie Mitchell
Jack	Black		M	January 29, 1814	Lincoln	Robbery		Peter Early
Unknown	Black		M	April 14, 1815	Baldwin	Attempted murder-Attempted rape	Lillie Lankford, white	Peter Early
James Nixon	White	25	M	February 19, 1816	Chatham	Murder		David Brydie Mitchell
Noyle Nelms	White	65	M	September 29, 1816	Baldwin	Counterfeiting		David Brydie Mitchell
John	Black		M	November 8, 1816	Baldwin	Rape	Suzanna Cobb, white	David Brydie Mitchell
Daniel Eldredge	White		M	September 25, 1817	Lincoln	Burglary		William Rabun
Margaret Seaborn	White		F	October 1817	Camden	Murder	Thomas G. Seaborn, white (husband)	William Rabun
John Castellaw	White		M	March 13, 1818	Jasper	Murder	Henry Slaughter, white	William Rabun
Eugene Whison	White	22	M	August 23, 1818	Baldwin			William Rabun
Jones	Black		M	1819	Laurens			William Rabun
Unknown	Black		M	February 12, 1819	Baldwin	Arson	John A. Jones, white (owner)	William Rabun
Coco	Black		M	May 17, 1819	Richmond	Slave revolt		William Rabun
Hamilton	Black		M	May 21, 1819	Richmond	Slave revolt		William Rabun
John	Black		M	May 21, 1819	Richmond	Slave revolt		William Rabun
Joseph Reos	White		M	June 18, 1819	Chatham	Murder		William Rabun
Sharper	Black		M	July 26, 1819	Laurens	Attempted murder	Joseph Perry, white	William Rabun

=== 1820s ===
Name	Race	Age	Sex	Date of execution	County	Crime	Victim(s)	Governor
Unknown	Black		M	1820-1821	Early	Murder	Brown Liverman, white (owner)	John Clark
John Hobson	White		M	April 28, 1820	Chatham (Federal)	Piracy		John Clark
Dick	Black		M	August 26, 1820	Hancock	Burglary		John Clark
Thomas Wells	White		M	October 21, 1820	Clarke	Murder	Peter Perry, white	John Clark
Isaac	Black		M	1821	Wilkes	Murder (Note: Isaac was coerced into committing the murders by Woodward Trammell, who was executed for the crime in 1823.)	Susan and Elizabeth Trammell, children, white (owners) (Note: Orphans, inherited Isaac from their late father Thomas Trammell.)	John Clark
Essex	Black		M	November 3, 1821	Effingham	Murder	Mr. Saunders, white	John Clark
Dave	Black		M	January 3, 1822	Baldwin	Aggravated assault	Male, white	John Clark
Woodward Trammell	White		M	May 16, 1823	Wilkes	Murder	Susan and Elizabeth Trammell, children, white (stepsisters)	John Clark
George	Black		M	March 15, 1825	Baldwin	Burglary		George Troup
Matthew Colson	White		M	November 18, 1825	Screven	Murder	William Flake, white	George Troup
Unknown	Black		M	December 1, 1825	Baldwin	Aggravated assault	Male, white	George Troup
Jack Winn	White		M	1826	Gwinnett			George Troup
Unknown	Black		M	February 1826	Greene	Murder	Male, black	George Troup
Patrick Dunlap	White		M	July 7, 1826	Richmond	Murder	William Clark, white	George Troup
Three unknowns	Native American		M	June 29, 1827	Thomas	Murder	Phillip and Nathan Paris, white	George Troup
Ludwill Watts	White		M	August 12, 1827	Butts	Murder		George Troup
William Fields	White		M	April 11, 1828	Bibb	Murder	James O. Abbott, elderly, white	John Forsyth
Unknown	White		M	April 19, 1828	Walker	Murder		John Forsyth
Joseph Williams	White		M	April 10, 1829	Twiggs	Murder	Nimrod Phillips, white	John Forsyth
William	Black		M	July 24, 1829	Chatham	Murder	Mahlon Dickinson, white (overseer)	John Forsyth
Little William	Black	16	M	July 24, 1829	Chatham	Murder	Mahlon Dickinson, white (overseer)	John Forsyth
Shade	Black		M	October 12, 1829	Laurens	Arson	J. B. Hathaway, white (Dublin postmaster)	George Rockingham Gilmer
Jenny	Black		F	December 4, 1829	Richmond	Arson		George Rockingham Gilmer

=== 1830s ===
Name	Race	Age	Sex	Date of execution	County	Crime	Victim(s)	Governor
Ellick	Black		M	?	Gwinnett	Murder	Male, white (owner)	?
Howard	White		M	April 23, 1830	Washington	Murder	Mr. Wicker, white	George Rockingham Gilmer
Cinda	Black		F	June 6, 1830	Richmond	Arson		George Rockingham Gilmer
George Tassell	Native American		M	December 24, 1830	Hall	Murder	Male, Native American	George Rockingham Gilmer
William Crowder	White		M	1831	DeKalb	Murder	Female, white (wife) (Note: Also murdered their three children and set their home on fire afterwards.)	Gilmer or Lumpkin
Harrison Sutherland	White		M	1833	Coweta	Murder	J. Hillsman, white	Wilson Lumpkin
Anderson	Black		M	April 26, 1833	Newton	Murder	Mr. White, white (owner)	Wilson Lumpkin
Sophie	Black		F	April 26, 1833	Newton	Murder	Mr. White, white (owner)	Wilson Lumpkin
Warren	Black		M	April 26, 1833	Newton	Murder	Mr. White, white (owner)	Wilson Lumpkin
John Johnson	White		M	November 23, 1833	Baldwin	Murder-Rape	Elenor Bustin, 13, white (sister-in-law)	Wilson Lumpkin
Forbes	White		M	December 27, 1833	McIntosh	Murder	Col. Brailsford, white	Wilson Lumpkin
John Hog Smith	Native American		M	1834	Walker	Murder	Male, Native American	Wilson Lumpkin
Humphrey Lee	Black		M	1834	Richmond	Murder	Mr. Lee, white (owner)	Wilson Lumpkin
James Graves	Native American		M	November 21, 1834	Murray	Murder	Unidentified male, white	Wilson Lumpkin
William Ward	White		M	December 19, 1834	Habersham	Murder	Benjamin Roper, white	Wilson Lumpkin
Dennis N. Owen	White		M	December 26, 1834	Bibb	Murder	John Manson, white	Wilson Lumpkin
Unknown	Black		M	February 1835	Greene	Murder	Male, black	Wilson Lumpkin
Thomas King III	White		M	May 8, 1835	Camden	Murder	Multiple people, white	Wilson Lumpkin
George Tooke	Native American		M	October 1835	Bartow			Wilson Lumpkin
Barney Swimmer	Native American		M	1835 (Note: Date also reported as 1834 or 1837.)	Floyd	Murder-Robbery	Ezekiel Blatchford, white	Lumpkin or Schley
Terrapin	Native American		M	1835	Floyd	Murder-Robbery	Ezekiel Blatchford, white	Lumpkin or Schley
Amy	Black		F	November 27, 1835	Richmond	Poisoning	Mrs. Moran, white	William Schley
Lewis Bakestraw	Black		M	March 25, 1836	Newton	Murder	Female, black (wife)	William Schley
Peter	Black		M	July 28, 1837	Elbert	Murder	Ben, black	William Schley
Bella	Black		F	December 26, 1837	Effingham	Murder	Judge E. Warren, white (owner)	George Rockingham Gilmer
George	Black		M	August 10, 1838	Richmond	Rape		George Rockingham Gilmer
Unknown	Black		M	March 1839	Greene	Burglary		George Rockingham Gilmer
Joseph Wofford	White		M	April 12, 1839	Cherokee	Murder	Thomas Copeland, white	George Rockingham Gilmer

=== 1840s ===
Name	Race	Age	Sex	Date of execution	County	Crime	Victim(s)	Governor
Claiborne	Black		M	1840	Jones	Murder	John Casey, white (owner) (Note: Confessed at his execution to another unspecified crime for which another person had been executed.)	Charles James McDonald
Five unknowns	Black		M	June 6, 1840	Camden	Murder	Alexander Atkinson, white (owner)	Charles James McDonald
Monday	Black		M	August 21, 1840	Chatham	Rape	Mrs. Dotson, white	Charles James McDonald
Unknown	Black		M	February 1841	Richmond	Slave revolt		Charles James McDonald
Moses	Black		M	February 1841	Stewart	Murder	Dr. Kirkpatrick, white	Charles James McDonald
Bartlett W. Murdock	White	25	M	April 29, 1842	Talbot	Murder	John Thurmond, white (Note: Also believed to have murdered one Mr. Knowlton (white) and burned the home of Mr. Taylor in Athens.)	Charles James McDonald
Peter	Black		M	July 1, 1842	Richmond	Murder	Female, black	Charles James McDonald
James Swetman	White		M	September 5, 1842	Jackson	Murder	Tom White, white	Charles James McDonald
Hamilton Snead	White		M	October 14, 1842	Lumpkin	Murder	Hugh Campbell, white	Charles James McDonald
Five unknowns	Black		M	December 1842	Jefferson	Murder	Robert Cunningham, white (owner)	Charles James McDonald
Unknown	Black		M	April 14, 1843	Jackson	Murder	William Foster, white (owner)	Charles James McDonald
Thomas J. Chambers	White		M	June 12, 1843	Gwinnett	Murder	Mr. Kemp, white	Charles James McDonald
Greene	White		M	July 21, 1843	Muscogee	Murder	Henry W. Arnett, white	Charles James McDonald
Samuel Mattox	White		M	1844	Lowndes	Murder	William Slaughter, minor, white	George W. Crawford
Alex Austin	White		M	1845	Gwinnett			George W. Crawford
Emaline	Black		F	May 10, 1845	Marion	Murder	Unknown, child, white	George W. Crawford
Sophie	Black		F	May 30, 1845	Thomas	Murder	Thomas Hayes, infant, white	George W. Crawford
Dave Pate	Black		M	1846	Carroll	Murder	Unknown, infant, black (child)	George W. Crawford
William Harris	White		M	1847	Coweta	Murder	J. McCollum, white	George W. Crawford
Warren J. Boon	White		M	April 1847	Greene	Murder	Mr. Allson, white	George W. Crawford
John Hudgins	White		M	April 30, 1847	Monroe	Murder	John Anderson, white (overseer)	George W. Crawford
Jones Butler	White		M	July 30, 1847	Muscogee	Murder	Mary Ann Corey, white (Note: Also previously murdered a Mr. Jacobs who was "the accomplice of Dr. E. A. Roberts, at the time of his attempted escape from the officers who had him in his charge.")	George W. Crawford
Unknown	Black		M	August 27, 1847	Effingham	Rape	Female, white	George W. Crawford
Tarrell	White		M	1848	Laurens	Murder	Male, white	George W. Towns
Two unknowns	Black		M	May 25, 1848	Randolph	Murder	Thomas P. Trotter and Richard Bolton, white (owners)	George W. Towns
Unknown	Black	17	M	August 27, 1848	Screven	Murder	Mrs. James D. Parker, white	George W. Towns
Joab	Black		M	1849	Franklin	Murder	Mr. Crawford, white (overseer)	George W. Towns
Will Taylor	Black		M	June 1849	Irwin	Murder (Note: Guilt significantly doubted by many due to circumstances.)	Male, white	George W. Towns
Elisha Reese	White		M	September 7, 1849	Bibb	Murder	Mrs. Pratt, white	George W. Towns

=== 1850s ===
Name	Race	Age	Sex	Date of execution	County	Crime	Victim(s)	Governor
Unknown	Black		M	1850-1854	Muscogee	Attempted murder	Joseph McGowen, white (owner)	?
George W. Evans	White		M	July 5, 1850	Muscogee	Murder		George W. Towns
Jeff Hardeman	Black		M	October 1850	Newton	Rape		George W. Towns
William Hall	White		M	October 1850	Greene	Murder	Simon Fuller, white	George W. Towns
Malinda	Black		F	October 21, 1851	Washington	Murder	Elizabeth Burns, white (owner)	George W. Towns
Stephen	Black		M	1852	Houston	Attempted rape	Mary Daniel, white	Howell Cobb
Unknown	Black		M	April 1852	Greene	Attempted murder	John L. Tarpley, white (owner)	Howell Cobb
Two unknowns	Black		M	November 12, 1852	Gordon	Rape		Howell Cobb
Frank	Black		M	June 1853	DeKalb	Murder	William H. Graham, white (owner)	Howell Cobb
Jerry	Black		M	July 1853	Randolph	Murder	D. B. Norton (owner) and his son, white	Howell Cobb
Lank	Black		M	November 25, 1853	Franklin	Murder-Rape	Ms. Stowe, white	Herschel V. Johnson
George	Black		M	November 25, 1853	Franklin	Murder-Rape	Ms. Stowe, white	Herschel V. Johnson
Washington	Black		M	July 1855	Thomas	Rape		Herschel V. Johnson
Bob	Black		M	August 22, 1856	Chatham	Murder	Judge, black	Herschel V. Johnson
Lewis	Black	28	M	October 17, 1856	Twiggs	Murder	Samuel and Sarah Taylor, 70 and 72, white (owners)	Herschel V. Johnson
Pines	White		M	May 1, 1857	Webster	Murder	Female, white (wife)	Herschel V. Johnson
Aaron	Black		M	July 10, 1857	Troup	Murder	Female, white (owner's wife)	Herschel V. Johnson
John Black	White		M	January 8, 1858	Habersham	Murder		Joseph E. Brown
John	Black		M	April 30, 1858	Greene	Murder	Jesse Smith Jones, white	Joseph E. Brown
Newton S. Hawkins	White		M	May 21, 1858	Gordon	Murder		Joseph E. Brown
Bedford Crockett	White		M	June 18, 1858	Fulton	Murder	Mr. Landrum, white	Joseph E. Brown
James Thompson	White	17	M	July 2, 1858	Muscogee	Murder	John Calhoun, 21, white	Joseph E. Brown
George	Black		M	September 28, 1858	Charlton	Murder	Henry H. Jones, white	Joseph E. Brown
Peter	Black		M	September 28, 1858	Charlton	Murder	Henry H. Jones, white	Joseph E. Brown
Henry Jackson	Black		M	November 3, 1858	DeKalb	Attempted rape		Joseph E. Brown
John Dozier	White		M	December 17, 1858	Muscogee	Murder	David Gunn, elderly, white	Joseph E. Brown
Samuel Hinch	White		M	December 17, 1858	Muscogee	Murder	Michael Tracy, white	Joseph E. Brown
William Mitchel	White		M	1859	Walker	Murder	John Cole, white	Joseph E. Brown
Isaac Freeland	White	52	M	April 15, 1859	Forsyth	Murder	Claiborne Vaughan, white	Joseph E. Brown
John Cobb Jr.	White		M	July 8, 1859	Fulton	Murder	Mr. Landrum, white	Joseph E. Brown
Hill	Black		M	September 9, 1859	Decatur	Murder	Mrs. Moses Saddler, white	Joseph E. Brown

=== 1860s ===
Executions by firing squad by the Union Army

Name	Race	Age	Sex	Date of execution	County	Crime	Victim(s)	Governor
Unknown	White		M	1860-1865	Whitfield (Military)	Spying-Espionage	N/A	Joseph E. Brown
Unknown	Black		M	1860	Ware	Murder	James Griffin, white (owner)	Joseph E. Brown
Levi McGinnis	White	51	M	March 15, 1861	Forsyth	Murder	Claiborne Vaughan, white	Joseph E. Brown
James Andrews	White	34	M	June 7, 1862	Fulton (Military)	Spying-Espionage	N/A	Joseph E. Brown
George Wilson	White		M	June 18, 1862	Fulton (Military)	Spying-Espionage	N/A	Joseph E. Brown
Marion Ross	White		M	June 18, 1862	Fulton (Military)	Spying-Espionage	N/A	Joseph E. Brown
Samuel Slavens	White		M	June 18, 1862	Fulton (Military)	Spying-Espionage	N/A	Joseph E. Brown
Philip Shadrach	White		M	June 18, 1862	Fulton (Military)	Spying-Espionage	N/A	Joseph E. Brown
William Campbell	White		M	June 18, 1862	Fulton (Military)	Spying-Espionage	N/A	Joseph E. Brown
John Scott	White		M	June 18, 1862	Fulton (Military)	Spying-Espionage	N/A	Joseph E. Brown
Samuel Robertson	White		M	June 18, 1862	Fulton (Military)	Spying-Espionage	N/A	Joseph E. Brown
John	Black		M	September 26, 1862	Baldwin	Murder	Jackson, black	Joseph E. Brown
John J. Taylor	White		M	1863 or 1864	Mitchell			Joseph E. Brown
Willis	Black		M	June 26, 1863	Troup			Joseph E. Brown
J. B. Bray	White		M	September 18, 1863	Floyd (Military)	Embezzlement	N/A	Joseph E. Brown
James Robertson	White	25	M	November 17, 1863	Fulton (Military)	Desertion	N/A	Joseph E. Brown
Elbert Cody	Black		M	November 27, 1863	Newton	Murder		Joseph E. Brown
Albert Hinton	Black		M	November 27, 1863	Newton	Arson	Male, white (owner)	Joseph E. Brown
Three unknowns	White		M	January 8, 1864	Whitfield (Military)	Desertion	N/A	Joseph E. Brown
Pleasant Smallwood	White		M	March 1864	Fulton (Military)	High treason	N/A	Joseph E. Brown
Keen	White		M	March 25, 1864	Whitfield (Military)	Desertion	N/A	Joseph E. Brown
James Lindsey	White		M	April 1864	Muscogee (Military)	Neglect of duty	N/A	Joseph E. Brown
Jacob Lovett	White		M	September 27, 1864	Chatham (Military)	Desertion	N/A	Joseph E. Brown
Isaac	Black		M	January 12, 1866	Richmond (Military) (Note: Crime committed in Hancock County.)	Murder	Henry Amos, 52, white	Charles J. Jenkins
Pvt. Murray	White		M	January 12, 1866	Bibb (Military)	Murder	James Samuel Clock, 27, white	Charles J. Jenkins
Thomas J. Musgrove	White	23	M	March 16, 1866	Bibb (Military) (Note: Crime committed in Randolph County.)	Murder-Robbery	Isaac Newton Armstrong, 21, white	Charles J. Jenkins
Essex Walker	Black		M	March 23, 1866	Richmond (Military)	Murder	Dr. Thomas A. Hyne, 44, white	Charles J. Jenkins
Annie Middlebrooks	Black		F	June 1, 1866	Jones	Murder	Francis Morgan Finney, 3, white	Charles J. Jenkins
William Burns	White		M	June 22, 1866	Richmond (Military)	Murder-Robbery	Capt. Charles H. Tew, white	Charles J. Jenkins
John Jackson	Black		M	June 22, 1866	Richmond (Military)	Murder-Robbery	Capt. Charles H. Tew, white	Charles J. Jenkins
David Howell	White		M	October 26, 1866	Cobb	Murder	Henry Gamble, black	Charles J. Jenkins
Dennis Harris	Black	40	M	November 2, 1866	Wilkinson	Murder-Burglary	Louisa Rollins, white	Charles J. Jenkins
Elias Mims	Black		M	December 14, 1866	Bibb	Murder-Burglary	Benjamin F. Ross, 49, white	Charles J. Jenkins
Jack Dortch	Black	20	M	April 18, 1867	Chatham	Murder	Henry Seckinger, 39, white	Charles J. Jenkins
Moses Bayfield	Black		M	April 18, 1867	Chatham	Murder	Henry Seckinger, 39, white	Charles J. Jenkins
James Sumter	Black		M	November 1, 1867	Bartow	Murder	Samuel Yancey, black	Charles J. Jenkins
William Smart Bass	Black	35	M	November 22, 1867	Taylor	Murder	Jacob Cozatt, 26, white	Charles J. Jenkins
Alfred Brannon	Black		M	November 22, 1867	Wilkinson	Murder	Jennie Brannon, black (wife)	Charles J. Jenkins
Amos Gorman	Black		M	October 9, 1868	Bibb	Murder-Robbery	Jonathan Sheffield, white	Rufus Bullock
Levi Jenkins	Black		M	October 9, 1868	Bibb	Murder-Robbery	Jonathan Sheffield, white	Rufus Bullock
Robert Whitus	Black		M	October 9, 1868	Bibb	Murder-Robbery	Jonathan Sheffield, white	Rufus Bullock
Sebron Simmons	Black		M	November 25, 1868	Early	Murder	Male, child, black	Rufus Bullock
Alfred Butler	Black		M	December 11, 1868	Spalding	Murder	Sallie Butler, black (wife)	Rufus Bullock
Thomas Tate	Black		M	May 28, 1869	Lincoln	Murder	Julia Ann Walton, black	Rufus Bullock
Bob Arnold	Black		M	July 30, 1869	Wilkes	Murder	Thomas Thaxton, 42, white	Rufus Bullock
Jesse Watkins	Black	18	M	September 10, 1869	Chatham	Murder-Robbery	Charles Wilson, 14, white	Rufus Bullock

=== 1870s ===
Name	Race	Age	Sex	Date of execution	County	Crime	Victim(s)	Governor
Ben Godly	Black	39	M	March 11, 1870	Burke	Murder	Adkins D. Lewis, 35, white	Rufus Bullock
Bythe Barlow	Black	29	M	July 29, 1870	Spalding	Murder	John McCluskey, 70, white	Rufus Bullock
Andrew Hill	Black		M	November 25, 1870	Meriwether	Murder	Capt. Thomas A. Holtzclaw, white	Rufus Bullock
Prince Albert	Black	23	M	May 26, 1871	Lee	Murder	William Miller, 20, white	Rufus Bullock
Diego Valliant	Black		M	June 9, 1871	McIntosh	Murder	Campbell Lewis, black	Rufus Bullock
Jim Toombs	Black	28	M	July 28, 1871	Houston	Murder	Reuben Hunter, 37, black	Rufus Bullock
Sam Hicks	Black		M	April 26, 1872	Wilkinson	Murder-Robbery	Joel Burke, 30, white	James Milton Smith
John Watkins	Black	27	M	May 31, 1872	Oglethorpe	Murder	Gabriel Johnson, 27, black	James Milton Smith
Wesley Walker	Black		M	June 17, 1872	Miller	Murder	Jacob Cowart, black	James Milton Smith
John Holsenbake	White	34	M	June 28, 1872	Macon	Murder	Col. George W. Fish, 51, white (judge)	James Milton Smith
James Lloyd	White	61	M	June 28, 1872	Macon	Murder	Col. George W. Fish, 51, white (judge)	James Milton Smith
Byrd Brooks	Mixed (Note: "Light mulatto".)	24	M	November 8, 1872	Hall	Rape	Sophia Hubbard, 30, white	James Milton Smith
Ben Bacon	Black	22	M	November 29, 1872	Richmond	Murder-Robbery	James H. Martin, 65, white	James Milton Smith
Mike Dobb	Black	52	M	January 3, 1873	Fayette	Murder	James Swanson, black	James Milton Smith
P. M. Barnes	Black	22	M	January 10, 1873	Jackson	Rape	Elvira Wilson, white	James Milton Smith
D. B. Dunstan	Black	24	M	January 10, 1873	Jackson	Rape	Nancy Dunson, 30, white (Note: Also attempted to rape her 13-year-old daughter Georgia Dunson.)	James Milton Smith
Crawford Norwood	Black	20	M	March 28, 1873	Jackson	Rape	Nancy Dunson, 30, white	James Milton Smith
Enoch Spann	White	41	M	April 11, 1873	Webster	Murder	Sarah Spann, 50+, white (wife)	James Milton Smith
Westley Tate	Black	23	M	April 25, 1873	Elbert	Murder	Jefferson Tate, black	James Milton Smith
Susan Eberhart	White	21	F	May 2, 1873	Webster	Murder	Sarah Spann, 50+, white	James Milton Smith
Nick Boswell	Black	22	M	May 23, 1873	Putnam	Murder	Robert Gadlin, black	James Milton Smith
Ishom O'Neil	White	32	M	June 13, 1873	Fulton	Murder	James Little, 29, white	James Milton Smith
George Copeland	Black	28	M	October 23, 1873	Greene	Murder-Rape-Burglary	Sarah Richards, 49, white	James Milton Smith
Lee Smith	Black		M	November 7, 1873	Webster	Murder	Katy Smith, black (wife)	James Milton Smith
Gus Peterson	Black		M	November 21, 1873	Dougherty	Murder	John Simmons, black (brother-in-law)	James Milton Smith
Hudson Raiford	Black		M	November 21, 1873	Chattahoochee	Murder	Frank Galloway, white	James Milton Smith
John Killen	Black		M	November 28, 1873	Pulaski	Murder	Jerry Mabin, black	James Milton Smith
Richard General	Black	22	M	January 16, 1874	Lowndes	Murder	William Boyson, black	James Milton Smith
Webster Lyons	Black	32	M	April 17, 1874	Thomas	Murder	Eliza Lyons, 31, black (wife)	James Milton Smith
Emanuel Dollman	Black	27	M	April 17, 1874	Thomas	Murder-Robbery	Juniper Hall, 55, white	James Milton Smith
Nimrod Bird	Black	31	M	April 17, 1874	Thomas	Murder-Robbery	Juniper Hall, 55, white	James Milton Smith
Charley Ponder	Black	43	M	April 17, 1874	Thomas	Murder-Robbery	Juniper Hall, 55, white	James Milton Smith
Ann Hunt	Mixed (Note: Mulatta.)	22	F	May 1, 1874	Elbert	Murder	Eliza Browner, 27, mixed (Note: "Yellow".) (Note: Serial killer, confessed to three other murders.)	James Milton Smith
Primus Edwards	Black		M	November 13, 1874	Sumter	Murder	Berry Adams, 25, black	James Milton Smith
James Berry Phillips	Black	23	M	November 24, 1874	Newton	Murder-Robbery	Mr. Gallagher, white	James Milton Smith
George Simms	Black	20	M	November 27, 1874	Newton	Rape	Mrs. Wallace, elderly, white	James Milton Smith
Louis Armstrong	Black		M	November 27, 1874	Franklin	Murder	Willis Dickson, 51, white	James Milton Smith
Bill Roseman	Black		M	January 29, 1875	Calhoun	Murder	Luke Crawford, black	James Milton Smith
Isaac Hooper	Black	28	M	February 19, 1875	Richmond	Murder	Howard Satterwhite, black	James Milton Smith
Henry Jackson	Black	19	M	April 30, 1875	Lee	Murder-Robbery	Joseph Johnson, 15, white	James Milton Smith
Pomp Haney	Black		M	May 14, 1875	Heard	Murder-Burglary	Webb Summerlin, 64, black	James Milton Smith
Jim Cooper	Black		M	May 14, 1875	Heard	Murder-Burglary	Webb Summerlin, 64, black	James Milton Smith
Elisha Yarbrough	White	17	M	May 28, 1875	Carroll	Murder-Robbery	Henry W. Smith, white	James Milton Smith
Alfred Aring	Black	26	M	June 4, 1875	Fulton	Murder	Joseph Mayfield, 23, black	James Milton Smith
John Purifoy	Black	40	M	June 25, 1875	Fulton	Murder-Robbery	John Casey, white	James Milton Smith
George Speed	Black	30	M	October 8, 1875	Fayette	Rape	Margaret Millsaps, 15, white	James Milton Smith
Rufus Evans	Black		M	December 17, 1875	Camden	Murder-Robbery	Charles Lang, 25, white	James Milton Smith
Edward Williams	Black		M	December 17, 1875	Camden	Murder-Robbery	Charles Lang, 25, white	James Milton Smith
John B. Petty	White	22	M	December 17, 1875	Camden	Murder	Elbert Allen, 44, white	James Milton Smith
Joshua Pinckney	Black		M	December 17, 1875	Camden	Murder	R. H. Eaton, 34, white	James Milton Smith
Nick Thompson	Black	24	M	December 17, 1875	Brooks	Murder	James H. Hunter, 42, white	James Milton Smith
Ed Sally	Black		M	April 29, 1876	Talbot	Murder	John Sally, black (stepfather)	James Milton Smith
Bob Jackson	Black		M	May 5, 1876	Dooly	Murder	Edward Clarke, black	James Milton Smith
Paul Campbell	Black		M	May 15, 1876	Effingham	Murder-Burglary	Isabelle and Isabelle Davis Jr., 38 and 7, white	James Milton Smith
Prince Robertson	Black		M	May 15, 1876	Effingham	Murder-Burglary	Isabelle and Isabelle Davis Jr., 38 and 7, white	James Milton Smith
Haywood Grant	Black	30	M	July 14, 1876	Floyd	Arson	Benjamin Winslow, white (Note: Serial killer, confessed to four murders, including that of Confederate General Hindman in Helena, Arkansas. Condemned for burning Winslow's storehouse in South Rome.)	James Milton Smith
James Berry Phillips	Black	19	M	November 24, 1876	Newton	Murder-Robbery	James Gallagher, white	James Milton Smith
George Williams	Black	24	M	April 24, 1877	Effingham	Murder	Willie Williams, 2, black (son)	Alfred H. Colquitt
David Beck	White	38	M	April 27, 1877	Chattooga	Murder	Russell H. Shamblin, 31, white (constable)	Alfred H. Colquitt
William Meeks	White		M	May 4, 1877	Polk	Murder	John McCormack, 31, white	Alfred H. Colquitt
Charles Tommey	Black	39	M	May 18, 1877	Sumter	Murder-Rape-Robbery	Benetah Caraway, 41, white	Alfred H. Colquitt
Stephen Brinkley	White	44	M	June 15, 1877	Coweta	Murder	Elizabeth Brinkley, 32, white (wife)	Alfred H. Colquitt
Anthony Goble	White	26	M	June 22, 1877	Gilmer	Murder	Charles L. Brown, 50+, white	Alfred H. Colquitt
Jack Thomasson	Black	16	M	July 6, 1877	Troup	Murder	Rebecca and Melvina Miller, 8 and 2, black	Alfred H. Colquitt
Frank Jones	Black		M	October 5, 1877	Twiggs	Murder	Peyton Chapman, black	Alfred H. Colquitt
Alfred Marshall	Black	39	M	December 21, 1877	Randolph	Murder	S. A. White, 28, white	Alfred H. Colquitt
Gus Johnson	White	24	M	March 15, 1878	Floyd	Murder	Alfred McCarver, 46, black (Note: Also previously murdered ex-slave Squire Foster and was a member of the Ku Klux Klan.)	Alfred H. Colquitt
Frank Perrins	Black	18	M	June 26, 1878	Chatham	Murder-Robbery	Frank J. Lee, 33, white	Alfred H. Colquitt
Dick Dawson	Black	27	M	July 5, 1878	Upson	Murder	Frank Cunningham, 27, black (brother-in-law)	Alfred H. Colquitt
Mike Shaw	White	25	M	July 12, 1878	Baldwin	Murder	Ardecia Moore Shaw, 25, white (wife)	Alfred H. Colquitt
Moses Allen	Black		M	November 2, 1878	Glascock	Murder	Benjamin Ivey, 44, white (sheriff)	Alfred H. Colquitt
Tom Jones	Black	54	M	May 9, 1879	Columbia	Murder	Mary Jones, black	Alfred H. Colquitt
Henry McLeod	Black	60+	M	May 9, 1879	Columbia	Murder	Henry McLeod Jr., black (son)	Alfred H. Colquitt
Anthony Collins	Black		M	May 16, 1879	Tattnall	Murder	Unknown, infant, black	Alfred H. Colquitt
Robert Skellie	White	41	M	May 23, 1879	Pierce	Murder	Female, white (wife)	Alfred H. Colquitt
Jordan Sheets	Black		M	November 14, 1879	Madison	Murder	John T. Ledbetter, 31, white	Alfred H. Colquitt
Drew Holloway	Black	20	M	December 19, 1879	Bulloch	Murder	Benson Brown, 30, black	Alfred H. Colquitt

=== 1880s ===
Name	Race	Age	Sex	Date of execution	County	Crime	Victim(s)	Governor
John Henry Johnson	Black	32	M	February 27, 1880	Chatham	Murder-Robbery	Daniel McDermott, white	Alfred H. Colquitt
Dan Brighety	Black	23	M	March 12, 1880	Thomas	Attempted rape	Mrs. Futch, white	Alfred H. Colquitt
George Jackson	Black		M	March 26, 1880	Paulding	Murder-Robbery	Jack Moss, black	Alfred H. Colquitt
Henry Ryan	Black	34	M	July 9, 1880	Burke	Murder-Robbery	Mary Thomas, 50+, black	Alfred H. Colquitt
Jim Morgan	Black		M	December 3, 1880	Emanuel	Murder	Bill Smith, black	Alfred H. Colquitt
Mose Twiggs	Black	24	M	January 28, 1881	Burke	Murder	William Driscoll, white	Alfred H. Colquitt
Frank Twiggs	Black	37	M	February 18, 1881	Burke	Murder	William Driscoll, white	Alfred H. Colquitt
Pink Pratt	Black	21	M	March 4, 1881	Cobb	Rape	Margaret Watkins, 11, white (Note: Attempted to rape two other girls prior to this.)	Alfred H. Colquitt
Henry Hill	Black	49	M	April 22, 1881	Hart	Murder	Thomas N. Skelton, 29, white (jailer)	Alfred H. Colquitt
Frank Hudson	Black	28	M	October 14, 1881	Terrell	Murder-Robbery	Three people, black (Note: David M. and Mary Lee (63 and 65, white) and Sallie Johnson (60, black).)	Alfred H. Colquitt
Tom Betts	Black	26	M	November 4, 1881	Clayton	Murder-Robbery	Hilliard Judge Moore, 68, white	Alfred H. Colquitt
Joe Harris	Black	22	M	November 11, 1881	Greene	Murder	Ezekiel T. Langston, 29, white (guard)	Alfred H. Colquitt
Levi Sparks	Black	37	M	November 18, 1881	Stewart	Rape	Ida Pope, 22, white	Alfred H. Colquitt
Sang Armore	Black	41	M	November 25, 1881	Taliaferro	Murder	Amos Ellington, 58, white	Alfred H. Colquitt
Jesse Williams	Black	17	M	January 16, 1882	Chatham	Murder-Robbery	Toby Lark, 90+, black	Alfred H. Colquitt
Anderson Jones	Black	28	M	January 20, 1882	Richmond	Murder-Robbery	John G. Harrelson, 20, white	Alfred H. Colquitt
James Hanvey	White	23	M	June 2, 1882	Carroll	Murder	Arthur McMullen, 48, white	Alfred H. Colquitt
William Moon	White	40	M	June 3, 1882	Carroll	Murder	John B. Ward, 28, white	Alfred H. Colquitt
Simon O'Quinn	Black	60	M	October 20, 1882	Dodge	Murder	James Quinn Harvard, 21, white	Alfred H. Colquitt
Robert Donaldson	Black	37	M	October 20, 1882	Dodge	Murder	James Quinn Harvard, 21, white	Alfred H. Colquitt
Joseph King	Black	39	M	October 20, 1882	Dodge	Murder	James Quinn Harvard, 21, white	Alfred H. Colquitt
Ella Moore	Black	32	F	October 20, 1882	Dodge	Murder	James Quinn Harvard, 21, white	Alfred H. Colquitt
Riddick Powell	Black	24	M	October 20, 1882	Dodge	Murder	James Quinn Harvard, 21, white	Alfred H. Colquitt
Edward Conyers	Black	24	M	December 8, 1882	Emanuel	Murder	Northern Pierce, 50, black	Alexander H. Stephens
Will Porter	Black	25	M	December 8, 1882	Houston	Murder-Robbery	Bill Swift, 16, black	Alexander H. Stephens
William Banks	Black	22	M	March 23, 1883	Walker	Murder-Burglary	Herod Herman Rudd, 68, white	James S. Boynton
Green Cunningham	Black	25	M	March 23, 1883	Walker	Murder-Burglary	Herod Herman Rudd, 68, white	James S. Boynton
D. F. Walker	White	24	M	May 4, 1883	Dade	Murder-Robbery	Samuel S. Hardberger, 47, white	James S. Boynton
Henry Knight	Black	22	M	May 18, 1883	Ware	Murder	Edward Hunter, 26, black	Henry Dickerson McDaniel
J. C. Jones	White	25	M	May 18, 1883	Oglethorpe	Murder	Surilla Matthews Jones, 16, white (wife)	Henry Dickerson McDaniel
John Bailey	Black	28	M	June 1, 1883	Bibb	Murder	Paris Tatman, 54, elderly, black	Henry Dickerson McDaniel
Harry Wimbush	Black	30	M	June 1, 1883	Bibb	Murder	Morgan Washington, 21, black	Henry Dickerson McDaniel
Elbert Stephenson	White	31	M	June 8, 1883	Gwinnett	Murder	Selina Clementine Jackson Stevenson, 46, white (aunt)	Henry Dickerson McDaniel
Tony James	Black	20	M	June 29, 1883	McIntosh	Murder	Prince Anderson, 21, black	Henry Dickerson McDaniel
George Wallace	Black	35	M	September 28, 1883	Chatham	Murder	Martin L. Jansen, white	Henry Dickerson McDaniel
Taylor Bryant	Black	27	M	October 19, 1883	Walton	Murder-Rape	Elizabeth V. Swords, white	Henry Dickerson McDaniel
Margaret Harris	Black	16	F	October 19, 1883	Gordon	Murder	Leila Lewis, 8, white	Henry Dickerson McDaniel
Ambrose West	Black	18	M	November 30, 1883	Worth	Murder	James Monroe, black	Henry Dickerson McDaniel
Jim Crumidy	Black		M	January 4, 1884 (Note: A telegram from the governor was received shortly after he was pronounced dead postponing the execution.)	Dodge	Murder	James A. Mitchell, white	Henry Dickerson McDaniel
Peter Wade	White		M	January 15, 1884	Laurens	Murder	William Quinn, white	Henry Dickerson McDaniel
David McLain	White	38	M	March 7, 1884	Chatham	Murder	William Freeman Sexton, 27, white	Henry Dickerson McDaniel
Willis Hodges	Black	23	M	April 18, 1884	Dodge	Murder	Lizzie Jones, black (ex-common-law wife)	Henry Dickerson McDaniel
Thomas Curry	Black	23	M	April 25, 1884	Walton	Murder	Powell Reid, 22, black	Henry Dickerson McDaniel
John McKithern	Black	21	M	May 23, 1884	Ware	Murder	Tom McCrimmon, black (cousin)	Henry Dickerson McDaniel
Leonidas Johnson	Black	22	M	May 23, 1884	Henry	Rape	Mrs. Cook, white (Note: Serial rapist, had previous sex crime and burglary convictions.)	Henry Dickerson McDaniel
Reuben Payton	Black		M	June 20, 1884	Glynn	Murder	Watt Russell, white	Henry Dickerson McDaniel
Fletcher Lowery	Black	28	M	July 11, 1884	Appling	Murder	John Brimage, black	Henry Dickerson McDaniel
Sam Williams	Black		M	July 18, 1884	Burke	Murder	Clem Bush, black	Henry Dickerson McDaniel
George Jones	Black		M	August 25, 1884	Terrell	Rape	Julia Ann Jennings, 57, white	Henry Dickerson McDaniel
George Hill	Black	35	M	October 31, 1884	Cherokee	Murder	William Bryant, black	Henry Dickerson McDaniel
Homer Perry	Black	15	M	November 7, 1884	Newton	Rape	Sissy Perry, 10, black	Henry Dickerson McDaniel
Warren Price	White	42	M	December 12, 1884	Johnson	Murder	Romanus F. Perry, 24, white (son-in-law)	Henry Dickerson McDaniel
Peter Johnson	Black	71	M	April 25, 1885	Mitchell	Murder	Godwin family, white (Note: Malinda Gregory (39), Richard Gregory (18), and Stephen Godwin (28).)	Henry Dickerson McDaniel
Moses Keaton	Black	64	M	April 25, 1885	Mitchell	Murder	Godwin family, white	Henry Dickerson McDaniel
Henry Etheridge	Black	23	M	June 19, 1885	Jones	Murder	Tom Clemons, black	Henry Dickerson McDaniel
Robert McCoy	Black	30	M	June 26, 1885	Screven	Murder	James Miller, white (constable)	Henry Dickerson McDaniel
William McGaughey	Black		M	October 17, 1885	Walton	Murder	Mollie McGaughey, black (wife)	Henry Dickerson McDaniel
John Drake	Black	19	M	March 26, 1886	Upson	Murder	Ella Drake, black (wife)	Henry Dickerson McDaniel
Dick Townsend	Black	23	M	July 16, 1886	Lowndes	Murder-Robbery	George Washington Epperson, 53, white (Bradford County, Florida sheriff) (Note: Serial killer, murdered three people in Florida before fleeing to Georgia and confessed to "numerous assaults and robberies" in both states.)	Henry Dickerson McDaniel
Willis Hudson	White	32	M	August 7, 1886	Clay	Murder	Marion Millirons, white	Henry Dickerson McDaniel
Jesse Cook	Black	25	M	September 17, 1886	Taylor	Murder	Delia Fowler Cook, 28, black (wife)	Henry Dickerson McDaniel
Frank Humphries	White	30	M	September 24, 1886	Baldwin	Murder-Rape	Carrie Raines and Ella Humphries, 43 and 32, white (sister-in-law and niece)	Henry Dickerson McDaniel
Henry Norris	White	36	M	October 15, 1886	Haralson	Murder	George Elliott, white	Henry Dickerson McDaniel
Preston Valentine	Black	30	M	January 21, 1887	Richmond	Murder-Robbery	William Vales, 68, white	John B. Gordon
Fred Morgan	Black	25	M	June 17, 1887	Chattooga	Murder	Emma Lewis, 24, black (girlfriend)	John B. Gordon
John Smith	White	34	M	June 17, 1887	Heard	Murder	Samuel Bonner Barker, 25, white	John B. Gordon
Jacob Leggett	Black	19	M	June 17, 1887	Tattnall	Murder	Lillie Graydon, black (girlfriend)	John B. Gordon
Ross Edwards	Black	30	M	October 14, 1887	Habersham	Murder	William Echols, 23, black	John B. Gordon
Tillman Justice	White	35	M	November 19, 1887	Towns	Murder	James B. Goddard, 68, white	John B. Gordon
Lewis Moore	Black	26	M	February 23, 1888	Quitman	Murder	Ransome Wright, black	John B. Gordon
George McDuffie	Black	39	M	May 11, 1888	Greene	Murder	William Cheney, black	John B. Gordon
Henry Weaver	Black		M	May 30, 1888	Early	Murder-Robbery	Miles West, black	John B. Gordon
Charles Blackman	Black	20	M	January 25, 1889	Schley	Murder	Stonewall Jackson Tondee, 20, white	John B. Gordon
Ed Fry	Black		M	January 25, 1889	Cobb	Murder	Patsy Williams, black (wife)	John B. Gordon
John Pickett	Black	19	M	June 14, 1889	Lee	Murder-Burglary	Nelson and Rhoda Brooks, 49 and 59, black	John B. Gordon
Will Dibell	Black	28	M	June 14, 1889	Thomas	Murder	Walter Long, black	John B. Gordon
Alex Henderson	Black	27	M	June 14, 1889	Decatur	Murder	Amos and Hettie Jackson, 34 and 8, black	John B. Gordon
Hardy Hamilton	Black		M	June 19, 1889	Floyd	Murder-Robbery	Joe Lee, Asian	John B. Gordon
Frank Blount	Black	30	M	July 26, 1889	Lowndes	Murder	William Miller, black	John B. Gordon
Will Williams	Black		M	November 8, 1889	Wilcox	Murder	Bartow S. Whigham, 28, white (Note: Fugitive from Lake County, Florida at time of crime for the murder of Nelse Durham (black).)	John B. Gordon
Pigg Vann	White	30	M	November 8, 1889	Chattooga	Murder	North H. White, white	John B. Gordon

=== 1890s ===
Name	Race	Age	Sex	Date of execution	County	Crime	Victim(s)	Governor
Philmore Ball	Black	29	M	January 3, 1890	Jefferson	Murder	James L. Evans, 22, white	John B. Gordon
James Butts	Black		M	February 13, 1890	Houston	Murder-Robbery	Capt. William Miller, 61, white	John B. Gordon
Edward Johnson	Black		M	February 13, 1890	Houston	Murder-Robbery	Capt. William Miller, 61, white	John B. Gordon
Will Hicks	Black	21	M	April 3, 1890	Clinch	Murder-Burglary	William H. and Nellie Hughes, 74 and 59, white	John B. Gordon
Bob McCoy	Black	19	M	April 3, 1890	Clinch	Murder-Burglary	William H. and Nellie Hughes, 74 and 59, white	John B. Gordon
Bob Hill	Black	32	M	May 9, 1890	Warren	Murder-Burglary	Alexander B. Rogers, 29, white	John B. Gordon
Ed Morrison	Black	18	M	October 17, 1890	Madison	Murder	Henry Hunter, 20, white	John B. Gordon
Thomas Woolfolk	White	27	M	October 29, 1890	Houston (Note: Change of venue from Bibb County.)	Murder	Nine people, white (Note: His father Richard Franklin Woolfolk (52), his stepmother Mattie Howard Woolfolk (40), their children Richard Jr. (20), Pearl (17), Annie (10), Rosebud (7), Charles (5), Mattie Jr. (18 mos.), and Mattie's aunt Temperance West (84).)	John B. Gordon
William Bethea	Black	26	M	November 7, 1890	Johnson	Murder	Robert Raiford, white	John B. Gordon
Alonzo Evans	Black	28	M	November 21, 1890	Bulloch	Murder	Henry J. Dutton, 32, white	William J. Northen
Henry Moore	Black		M	November 21, 1890	Wayne	Murder	Unidentified male, white	William J. Northen
Lewis Watson	Black		M	December 5, 1890	Worth	Murder	Jack Curry, black	William J. Northen
Charles Williams	Black		M	December 19, 1890	Charlton	Murder	Female, black (wife)	William J. Northen
Charles Reeves	Black		M	January 15, 1891	McIntosh	Murder	Theodore Gronwald, 45, white	William J. Northen
Rena Turner	Black	20	M	April 21, 1891	Clay	Murder	Thomas Glenn, 22, black	William J. Northen
Rufus Moore	Black	21	M	May 15, 1891	Dade	Murder	Henry Slade, black	William J. Northen
Benjamin Chambers	Black		M	May 22, 1891	Ware	Murder	Sam Strother, black	William J. Northen
Sam Snelling	Black	20	M	May 28, 1891	Randolph	Murder	Seaborn Batts, 32, black (Note: Also later murdered bailiff Edward B. Skipper (40, white) while resisting arrest.)	William J. Northen
Sherman Brooks	Black	22	M	June 20, 1891	Jefferson	Murder	Simon Kelley, 22, black	William J. Northen
Ezekiel Lemax	White	31	M	June 26, 1891	Decatur	Murder	Georgia Willis Lemax, 32, white (wife)	William J. Northen
George Washington	Black	24	M	July 3, 1891	Fulton	Murder	Ben Oliver, 25, black (Note: Serial killer, confessed to four total murders.)	William J. Northen
Charles Ozborn	White	31	M	July 24, 1891	Fulton	Murder	John M. Bradley, 45, white	William J. Northen
Frank Danforth	Black		M	September 4, 1891	Richmond	Murder	Lizzie Gray, black (girlfriend)	William J. Northen
Albert Morea	Black	31	M	September 18, 1891	Chatham	Murder	Rhena Singleton, 20, black (wife) (Note: Also confessed to also murdering his previous wife, 21-year-old Rhena Ketchen.)	William J. Northen
Alexander Morris	Black		M	October 16, 1891	Morgan	Murder	Three people, black (Note: His wife Mary and her parents, Daniel and Lucy Lockett (53 and 51).)	William J. Northen
Sam Greer	Black	20	M	October 16, 1891	Butts	Murder	Wade Yancey, 19, black	William J. Northen
Tom Webb	Black	22	M	November 6, 1891	Washington	Rape	Fannie Smith, 10, white (Note: Serial rapist, later raped a 10-year-old black girl.)	William J. Northen
A. B. Weyman	Black	23	M	November 6, 1891	Dade	Murder	Jesse Rankin and Patrick Rawlin, 22 (Rankin), white (guards) (Note: Serial killer, serving a life sentence for the murder of John Russo (27, white) at time of crime.)	William J. Northen
William Blasch	Black	24	M	November 21, 1891	Montgomery	Murder-Burglary	Thomas Richard Bone, 49, white	William J. Northen
William McCoy	Black	22	M	January 8, 1892	Liberty	Murder	John W. Bowie, black	William J. Northen
Sol Rowell	Black	17	M	January 8, 1892	Calhoun	Rioting	John W. Arnold, 23, white (Note: It is unknown who actually killed the victim, who had been shot during a race riot in 1890, however Rowell and Richards were prosecuted as being the principal rioters.)	William J. Northen
Bob Richards	Black		M	January 8, 1892	Calhoun	Rioting	John W. Arnold, 23, white	William J. Northen
Allen Bray	Black	43	M	January 8, 1892	Troup	Murder	Mary B. Prather, 61, white	William J. Northen
Lucius Dotson	Black	28	M	January 22, 1892	Chatham	Murder	Jeff Coates, black	William J. Northen
Charles Cummings	Black	30	M	February 19, 1892	Chatham	Murder	David Williams, 20, black	William J. Northen
Walter Cook	Black	19	M	April 1, 1892	Fulton (Note: Executed at Fairburn in what was then Campbell County.)	Murder-Robbery	Andrew Kiser, 18, white	William J. Northen
Elijah Chaves	Black		M	May 13, 1892	Ware	Murder	H. A. Culpepper, white (sheriff)	William J. Northen
Coleman Wilson	Black		M	May 13, 1892	McDuffie	Murder-Robbery	Daniel Tice Adkins, 58, white	William J. Northen
Seaborn Smith	Black	22	M	May 20, 1892	Newton	Rape	Leila Aiken, 12, black	William J. Northen
Edward Banks	Black	19	M	June 30, 1892	Macon	Murder	William Belvin, 21, white	William J. Northen
Peter Daniels	Black		M	July 15, 1892	Fulton	Murder	Sylvia Lyle, black	William J. Northen
Gus Williams	Black		M	July 22, 1892	Chatham	Murder-Robbery	August W. Meyer, white	William J. Northen
Joe Thomas	Black	27	M	August 19, 1892	Jasper	Murder	Wilkes Walker, 51, black	William J. Northen
Edmond Green	White	23	M	August 26, 1892	Fannin	Murder	William O. Keener, 32, white	William J. Northen
Roscoe Marable	Black	24	M	October 6, 1892	Walker	Murder-Robbery	Nehemiah Evitt, 56, white	William J. Northen
Orrin Coney	Black	34	M	October 31, 1892	Dooly	Murder	Moses Morgan, 35, black	William J. Northen
Willie Bell	Black	14	M	November 29, 1892	Bibb	Murder	Benjamin F. Wilder, 33, white (police officer)	William J. Northen
Louis Lewis	Black	30	M	March 31, 1893	Bibb	Murder	Melinda Lewis, black (wife)	William J. Northen
Nathan Smith	Black		M	April 29, 1893	Crawford	Murder-Burglary	Randall Bell and Dow Walker, 51 (Bell), black	William J. Northen
Jesse Yarborough	Black		M	May 5, 1893	Columbia	Murder-Robbery	Jabez Williams, 17, black	William J. Northen
Henry Ramsey	Black		M	May 26, 1893	Richmond	Murder	Robert Y. Harris, white (Summerville marshal)	William J. Northen
Nick Nutting	Black	19	M	May 26, 1893	Montgomery	Murder	Zuilda Neal, 5, black (Note: Confessed to also having previously murdered Forsyth County marshal Reddy Harris.)	William J. Northen
Sumner Racken	Black		M	June 30, 1893	Burke	Murder	Capt. Franklin Moses Francis, 40, white	William J. Northen
Sam Thorpe	Black	18	M	June 30, 1893	Chatham	Murder	Charles Brinson, black	William J. Northen
James Lamar	Black	30	M	June 30, 1893	McIntosh	Murder	Archie Bird, 29, black	William J. Northen
Jim Courney	Black	28	M	July 28, 1893	Ware	Murder	Jake Smith, black	William J. Northen
Weldon Gordon	Black	29	M	September 28, 1893	Montgomery	Murder	Zerilda Neal, 5, black	William J. Northen
Purse Strickland	Mixed (Note: Described as a "mongrel" from Robeson County, North Carolina. All apart from Gordon were of white, black, and Native ancestry, with two being predominantly white and the other two being predominantly black (none specified by name.))	20	M	September 28, 1893	Montgomery	Murder	Jim Locklear, black	William J. Northen
Lucian Manuel	Mixed (Note: Described as "half-breed Indians from North Carolina". All apart from Gordon were of white, black, and Native ancestry, with two being predominantly white and the other two being predominantly black (none specified by name.))	22	M	September 28, 1893	Montgomery	Murder-Robbery	Alexander Peterson, 35, white	William J. Northen
Hyre Brewington	Mixed	19	M	September 28, 1893	Montgomery	Murder-Robbery	Alexander Peterson, 35, white	William J. Northen
Hiram Jacobs	Mixed	24	M	September 28, 1893	Montgomery	Murder-Robbery	Alexander Peterson, 35, white	William J. Northen
Will Dutton	White	36	M	October 20, 1893	Bartow	Murder	Sally Mobbs, 20, white	William J. Northen
Ike Williams	Black	48	M	October 27, 1893	Morgan	Murder	Harriet Williams, 35, black	William J. Northen
John Rutherford	Black	39	M	November 17, 1893	Dade	Murder	Jesse Rankin and Patrick Rawlin, 22 (Rankin), white (guards)	William J. Northen
Will Stanley	Black	25	M	November 24, 1893	Pike	Murder	Martin Thomas, 32, black	William J. Northen
Charles Johnston	Black		M	December 1, 1893	Emanuel	Murder	Rev. William Shields, black	William J. Northen
Jerry Mumford	Black	21	M	January 26, 1894	Wayne	Murder	James Roberts, black	William J. Northen
Henry Spencer	Black	25	M	March 1, 1894	Thomas	Murder	Mose Green, 38, black (brother-in-law)	William J. Northen
Henry Miller	Black	26	M	May 25, 1894	Bibb	Murder-Robbery	John Braswell, 47, white (Note: Serial killer, confessed to the unsolved murder of Pink Ryan and three other murders along the Ocmulgee River as well as being a member of the Ku Klux Klan.)	William J. Northen
Frank Coleman	Black		M	June 15, 1894	Jasper	Murder	William Smith, black	William J. Northen
Alex Williams	Black	25	M	December 14, 1894	Elbert	Murder	Newton Hampton, 23, black	William Yates Atkinson
Henry Archer	Black		M	January 11, 1895	Screven	Murder-Burglary	John A. Jackson, 28, white	William Yates Atkinson
Harrison Stevens	Black	29	M	January 31, 1895	Terrell	Murder	Jacob Greene Wells, 36, white	William Yates Atkinson
Jabez Williams	Black		M	February 8, 1895	Richmond	Murder	Joseph H. Murray, white (detective) (Note: Previously robbed and murdered Anderson Williams (22, black) in Edgefield County, South Carolina and murdered Murray while resisting arrest, killing bystander John Davis (60+, white).)	William Yates Atkinson
Will Murray	Black	25	M	February 8, 1895	Sumter	Murder	Willie J. Sims, 26, white	William Yates Atkinson
George Egan	Black	23	M	March 1, 1895	Fulton (Note: Executed at Fairburn in what was then Campbell County.)	Murder-Robbery	Anselm Leigh, 55, white	William Yates Atkinson
Wash Strong	Black	26	M	March 16, 1895	Pulaski	Murder	Johnson Duncan, 28, black	William Yates Atkinson
Richard Gates	Black		M	April 5, 1895	Troup	Murder	Lee Sledge, black	William Yates Atkinson
Lamar Jeffries	Black	22	M	April 5, 1895	Brooks	Murder	"Tip" Maudlin, white (constable)	William Yates Atkinson
Edward Brooks	Black	18	M	May 3, 1895	Sumter	Murder	Will Mixon, 15, black	William Yates Atkinson
Irwin Birch	Black		M	May 31, 1895	Tattnall	Murder	John Caldwell, black	William Yates Atkinson
George McCrary	Black		M	October 25, 1895	Meriwether	Murder	Billy Mills, black	William Yates Atkinson
Amanda Cody	Black		F	November 22, 1895	Warren	Murder	Cicero Cody, black (Amanda's husband)	William Yates Atkinson
Florence English	Black		M	November 22, 1895	Warren	Murder	Cicero Cody, black (Amanda's husband)	William Yates Atkinson
John Jackson	Black		M	January 10, 1896	Randolph	Murder	George Rawson, 39, black	William Yates Atkinson
W. S. Keener	White	27	M	February 15, 1896	Rabun	Murder	Lilly Etta and Laura Moore, 19 and 17, white (cousins)	William Yates Atkinson
Green Waters	Black		M	April 24, 1896	Meriwether	Murder	Cindy Waters, black (wife)	William Yates Atkinson
Arthur Hayne	White	25	M	September 4, 1896	Fulton	Murder	Will Spinks, 28, white	William Yates Atkinson
Sankey Cunningham	Black		M	January 1, 1897	Dougherty	Rape	Katie Camp, 31, white	William Yates Atkinson
Jake Burney	Black		M	January 22, 1897	Lowndes	Murder	Tom Butler, black	William Yates Atkinson
William Deas	Black	14	M	February 26, 1897	Jefferson	Rape	Ella Lawson, white	William Yates Atkinson
George Elder	Black	31	M	March 26, 1897	Oconee	Murder	Robert Jones, elderly, black	William Yates Atkinson
Lovett Brookins	Black		M	April 16, 1897	Jefferson	Murder	Sanders Oliphant and Lelia McCrary, 39 (Oliphant), black	William Yates Atkinson
Linton Finney	Black		M	May 21, 1897	Oglethorpe	Murder	Julius Hardy, 25, white	William Yates Atkinson
Elijah Morton	Black		M	May 21, 1897	Telfair	Murder	Charles and Ellen Cromartie, black (parents-in-law)	William Yates Atkinson
Henry White	White	20	M	June 4, 1897	Muscogee	Murder	William Jackson, white (police officer) (Note: Murdered two other police officers, 49-year-old Richard M. Adams and Charles J. Roberts, during the same crime.)	William Yates Atkinson
Thomas Delk	White	24	M	June 18, 1897	Pike	Murder	William O. Gwyn, 53, white (sheriff)	William Yates Atkinson
Terrell Hudson	Black	19	M	June 25, 1897	DeKalb	Murder	Seaborn Malcolm, black	William Yates Atkinson
Jonas Jones	Black	21	M	July 10, 1897	McIntosh	Murder	Luke King, black	William Yates Atkinson
Horace Perry	White		M	September 8, 1897	DeKalb	Murder	N. Bely Lanier, white	William Yates Atkinson
Erastus Brown	Black	31	M	December 10, 1897	Bulloch	Murder	Ben Alexander, black	William Yates Atkinson
Henry Nesbit	Black		M	December 10, 1897	Irwin	Murder	James Arlington, black (Note: Suspected serial killer, reportedly murdered nine men.)	William Yates Atkinson
Bud Brooks	White	33	M	December 17, 1897	Jackson	Murder-Robbery	Millard C. Hunt, 41, white	William Yates Atkinson
Grady Reynolds	White	35	M	December 17, 1897	Jackson	Murder-Robbery	Millard C. Hunt, 41, white	William Yates Atkinson
Tom Cyrus	Black		M	January 7, 1898	Fulton	Murder	Annie Johnson, black (girlfriend)	William Yates Atkinson
Simon Hopkins	Black	22	M	January 7, 1898	Decatur	Murder-Robbery	John Harris, black	William Yates Atkinson
Christopher C. Luby	White	38	M	February 18, 1898	Early	Murder	Flora E. Luby, white (wife)	William Yates Atkinson
Isaiah Thomas	Black	18	M	March 11, 1898	Hancock	Rape	Effie Hawkins, 31, mixed (Note: Mulatta.) (Note: "Incipient serial rapist," nearly lynched twice previously by other African-Americans.)	William Yates Atkinson
Bristow Graham	Black	23	M	April 8, 1898	Chatham	Murder	Ben Wilson, black	William Yates Atkinson
Zach Holmes	Black		M	April 29, 1898	Coffee	Murder	James Nathaniel Blitch, 33, white	William Yates Atkinson
Asbury Mills	Black	26	M	June 17, 1898	Dooly	Murder	Rena McKenzie, black (girlfriend)	William Yates Atkinson
John Weaver	Black	24	M	July 30, 1898	Upson	Rape	Jennie Gunn, 19, white	William Yates Atkinson
Wade Hampton	Black	19	M	November 9, 1898	Fulton	Murder	George Loftin, 16, black	Allen D. Candler
Willie Brown	Black	17	M	December 9, 1898	Bryan	Murder-Robbery	Thomas Benton, 16, white	Allen D. Candler
Reuben Battle	Black	17	M	December 16, 1898	Greene	Murder	James Davis, black	Allen D. Candler
Abner Taylor	White	29	M	December 16, 1898	Bibb	Murder	Minnie Lee Logue Taylor, 21, white (wife)	Allen D. Candler
Abe Smalls	Black	22	M	January 13, 1899	Chatham	Murder	Jensen Christian Neve, 42, white (Savannah mounted police officer)	Allen D. Candler
Jefferson Hicks	Black		M	February 1, 1899	Macon	Murder	Mary Hicks, black (wife)	Allen D. Candler
John Charlton	Black	29	M	March 10, 1899	Chatham	Murder	Harry A. McLeod, 40, white	Allen D. Candler
Robert Lewis	White	24	M	March 14, 1899	Fulton	Murder	Charles Haynes, white	Allen D. Candler
Cassius Law	Black		M	April 12, 1899	Hall	Murder	Sarah Curry, black	Allen D. Candler
Frank Wright	Black	34	M	April 28, 1899	Chatham	Murder	Amos Moy, 19, black (stepson)	Allen D. Candler
Bill Embree	Black	22	M	May 3, 1899	McDuffie	Murder	Ellis Martin Jr., 24, black	Allen D. Candler
Joby Brown	Black	25	M	May 12, 1899	Chatham	Murder	Rosa Brown, 19, black (wife)	Allen D. Candler
Will Williams	Black		M	May 19, 1899	Telfair	Murder	Lovett P. Peacock, 47, white	Allen D. Candler
Crawford Mobley	Black		M	May 25, 1899	Burke	Murder	Edward Lovett, 43, black (father-in-law)	Allen D. Candler
Jim Rembart	Black		M	June 16, 1899	Mitchell	Murder	Amanda Smyles, 80+, black	Allen D. Candler
Cain Stephens	Black	22	M	June 23, 1899	Dodge	Murder	E. J. Osborn, 50+, white (Chauncey marshal)	Allen D. Candler
Will Ables	Black	17	M	June 30, 1899	Appling	Rape	Vicey Edgerton, 35, white	Allen D. Candler
Will Wilson	Black	24	M	July 14, 1899	Dodge	Murder	E. J. Osborn, 50+, white (Chauncey marshal)	Allen D. Candler
Isaiah Scott	Black	26	M	July 21, 1899	Chatham	Murder	Marie Scott, 20, black (wife)	Allen D. Candler
Joe Carroll	Black		M	August 29, 1899	Fulton	Murder	Josephine Alexander, black	Allen D. Candler
Hillard Brooks	Black		M	September 15, 1899	Harris	Murder	Will Bankston, black	Allen D. Candler
James Hall	Black	21	M	September 28, 1899	Early	Rape	Ella Brown, 9, black	Allen D. Candler
Mack Cannon	Black	26	M	October 27, 1899	Wilkinson	Murder	John Briscoe, black	Allen D. Candler
Richard Smith	Black	42	M	December 1, 1899	Houston	Murder-Robbery	Bob Pine, 39, black	Allen D. Candler
Mack Taylor	Black	27	M	December 6, 1899	Richmond	Murder-Robbery	Alfred A. Seago, 40, white	Allen D. Candler
W. J. Glaser	White	43	M	December 15, 1899	Dougherty	Murder	Elizabeth Glaser, white (wife)	Allen D. Candler
James Gooding	Black		M	December 15, 1899	Lowndes	Murder-Robbery	Henry Vickers, 26, white	Allen D. Candler
Washington Powell	Black		M	December 15, 1899	Lowndes	Murder-Robbery	Henry Vickers, 26, white	Allen D. Candler
Wesley Tiller	Black	22	M	December 16, 1899	Hart	Murder	Vinie Myers Tiller, 18, black (wife)	Allen D. Candler

=== 1900s ===
Name	Race	Age	Sex	Date of execution	County	Crime	Victim(s)	Governor
Sam Harris	Black	19	M	January 4, 1900	Floyd	Murder	David C. Erwin, 21, black	Allen D. Candler
Edward Fields	Black		M	January 5, 1900	Jackson	Murder	Virginia Griffith, black	Allen D. Candler
Sherman Rivers	Black		M	January 5, 1900	Emanuel	Murder	George Perdue, black	Allen D. Candler
Charley Williams	Black		M	January 12, 1900	Decatur	Murder	Female, black ("concubine")	Allen D. Candler
Philip Denson	Black		M	January 19, 1900	Decatur	Murder	Will Lane, black	Allen D. Candler
Will Leonard	Black		M	March 2, 1900	Talbot	Murder	Nora Dean Leonard and Mary Francis Dean, 27 and 64, black (wife and mother-in-law)	Allen D. Candler
Allen Fuller	Black		M	April 2, 1900	Bibb	Murder-Robbery	Eugenia Hamilton Pottle, white	Allen D. Candler
King Goolsby	Black	17	M	April 6, 1900	Appling	Murder-Robbery	Daniel A. Mims, 33, white (Note: His 1-year-old daughter Pauline was also fatally injured during the attack.)	Allen D. Candler
Lewis Goolsby	Black	15	M	April 6, 1900	Appling	Murder-Robbery	Daniel A. Mims, 33, white	Allen D. Candler
Homer Crawford	Black	23	M	April 20, 1900	Lee	Murder	Johnson Pate, 33, black	Allen D. Candler
Dillard Herndon	White	50	M	August 17, 1900	Wilkes	Murder-Robbery	John J. Lovinggood, 26, white	Allen D. Candler
Hiram Sharp	White	51	M	August 28, 1900	DeKalb	Murder	Clary Crosby Sharpe, 45, white (wife)	Allen D. Candler
Sam Robinson	Black	22	M	September 1, 1900	Cobb	Rape	Ida V. Inzer, 18, white	Allen D. Candler
William Branch	Black	33	M	October 29, 1900	Elbert	Murder	George D. Bell, 42, white	Allen D. Candler
Manzo Glover	Black	22	M	November 15, 1900	Newton	Murder	Carey Henderson, 26, black	Allen D. Candler
Will Hines	Black	23	M	January 10, 1901	Mitchell	Murder	Minnie Walker, black	Allen D. Candler
Arnold Augustus	Black	51	M	June 14, 1901	Screven	Murder	William Milton Mears and Richard Fillmore Herrington, 34 and 44, white (police officers)	Allen D. Candler
Andrew Davis	Black	28	M	June 14, 1901	Screven	Murder	William Milton Mears and Richard Fillmore Herrington, 34 and 44, white (police officers)	Allen D. Candler
Richard Saunders	Black	24	M	June 14, 1901	Screven	Murder	William Milton Mears and Richard Fillmore Herrington, 34 and 44, white (police officers)	Allen D. Candler
William Hudson	Black	38	M	June 14, 1901	Screven	Murder	William Milton Mears and Richard Fillmore Herrington, 34 and 44, white (police officers)	Allen D. Candler
Sam Baldwin	Black		M	June 14, 1901	Screven	Murder	William Milton Mears and Richard Fillmore Herrington, 34 and 44, white (police officers)	Allen D. Candler
Tricey Griffin	Black	18	M	June 14, 1901	Glynn	Murder	Robert Marion Lattimer, 31, white	Allen D. Candler
George Mitchell	Black	28	M	August 2, 1901	Chatham	Rape	Patience Maxwell, 34, black (Note: Also raped another black woman that same day.)	Allen D. Candler
Edmond Scott	Black	21	M	August 2, 1901	Troup	Murder	Lena and Carrie Huguley, 24 and 33, black	Allen D. Candler
Raymond Ross	Black	22	M	August 27, 1901	Cherokee	Rape	Harriet Miller, 42, white	Allen D. Candler
Levi Carroll	Black	24	M	September 5, 1901	Bibb	Murder	Hardy Carroll (father) and Dinah Lockhart (girlfriend), 53 and 38, black	Allen D. Candler
Romulus Williams	Black		M	September 6, 1901	Houston	Murder	Adam Hunnicutt, 41, black	Allen D. Candler
Neal Ryles	Black	25	M	October 19, 1901	Banks	Murder	Eliza Ryles, black (wife)	Allen D. Candler
Will Jackson	Black	25	M	November 1, 1901	Bartow	Rape	Tiney Smith, 22, white	Allen D. Candler
Ernest Outland	Black	20	M	January 3, 1902	Screven	Murder	Tom Mitchell, black	Allen D. Candler
John Robinson	Black		M	January 3, 1902	Laurens	Murder-Rape	Bertha Simmons, black (Note: Possible serial killer, suspected in five similar murders.)	Allen D. Candler
John Peavey	Black		M	March 21, 1902	Dooly	Murder	Jesse Ford, black	Allen D. Candler
Arthur Price	Black	20	M	May 2, 1902	Bibb	Murder	Martha E. Rowland, 60, white	Allen D. Candler
Floyd Reese	Black	62	M	May 23, 1902	Burke	Murder	Anthony Lane, 27, white	Allen D. Candler
Joseph E. Sparks	Black		M	July 11, 1902	Decatur	Murder	Lula Sparks, black (wife)	Allen D. Candler
W. R. Wells	White	55	M	July 21, 1902	Fulton	Murder	Frederick Pierce, 47, white	Allen D. Candler
Jesse Gibson	Black	24	M	August 8, 1902	Warren	Rape	Mary Lou Bacon, 8, white	Allen D. Candler
Boisey Bryant	Black	18	M	September 12, 1902	Berrien	Murder	William A. Hynds, 54, white (Adel marshal)	Allen D. Candler
Harry Jones	Black	22	M	October 11, 1902	Elbert	Rape	Carrie Cleveland, 23, white	Allen D. Candler
Goldy Tyus	Black	19	M	December 12, 1902	Thomas	Murder	Jefferson Davis Godwin, 40, white (Note: Also murdered his brother, 44-year-old Alexander Mathew Godwin (Cairo town marshal).)	Joseph M. Terrell
Sol Dunn	Black	26	M	January 9, 1903	Richmond	Murder	Edward Springs, 23, white	Joseph M. Terrell
Robert Simmons	Black		M	January 30, 1903	Chatham	Murder	George Harris, 35, white	Joseph M. Terrell
Miles Johnson	Black	27	M	February 6, 1903	Richmond	Rape	Female, 6, white	Joseph M. Terrell
Henry Steele	Black	26	M	March 13, 1903	Thomas	Murder	Goodman Pittman, 21, white	Joseph M. Terrell
John Bryant	Black		M	March 20, 1903	Colquitt	Murder	Dandy Buckner and a woman, black	Joseph M. Terrell
George Hamp	Black	27	M	April 10, 1903	Morgan	Murder	Unidentified female, black	Joseph M. Terrell
Charlie Phillips	Black		M	May 1, 1903	Dade	Murder	Ed Davis, black (inmate) (Note: Serving a life sentence for another murder at time of crime.)	Joseph M. Terrell
Henry Owens	Black		M	May 8, 1903	Charlton	Murder	Female, black (wife)	Joseph M. Terrell
Monroe Adams	Black	41	M	May 15, 1903	Sumter	Murder	Mollie and Bobbie Adams, 39 and 21, black (wife and daughter)	Joseph M. Terrell
Oscar Cicero	Black	30	M	June 12, 1903	Mitchell	Murder	Bud Ballard, black (Note: The victim, a cross-dresser, was presenting as female at the time of the crime.)	Joseph M. Terrell
Abe Cohen	Black	27	M	July 10, 1903	Chatham	Murder	Susan Rodgers, 25, black	Joseph M. Terrell
Dennis Miller	Black	21	M	July 10, 1903	Charlton	Murder	Lewis Strickland, black (Note: Admitted to killing three other men over the previous five years, but claimed self defense.)	Joseph M. Terrell
Millard Lee	White	23	M	October 30, 1903	Fulton	Murder	Lilla May Suttles, 17, white (love interest)	Joseph M. Terrell
Robert Middlebrooks	Black	65	M	December 11, 1903	Bartow	Murder	Robert L. Read, 38, white (court bailiff)	Joseph M. Terrell
Ned Ferguson	Black		M	December 17, 1903	Worth	Murder	Henry Tucker, 29, black (inmate) (Note: Serving a life sentence for the murder of a boy named Ben Bethel (black) at Talbotton at time of crime.)	Joseph M. Terrell
William Grant	Black	23	M	December 18, 1903	Decatur	Murder	James Byrd, 26, white	Joseph M. Terrell
Lee Cribb	White	26	M	December 18, 1903	Coffee	Murder	Emmett White, 13, white (Note: Also killed Nicholls town marshal Thomas Holton (38, white) during the same crime.)	Joseph M. Terrell
Will Hardy	Black	26	M	December 22, 1903	Mitchell	Murder-Robbery	Raymond Mullins, white	Joseph M. Terrell
John Harris	Black	45	M	January 15, 1904	Fulton	Murder	Hans C. Drasbach, 39, white (police officer)	Joseph M. Terrell
Tom Carruthers	Black	27	M	February 1, 1904	Rockdale	Murder	Henry L. Bird, 37, white (overseer)	Joseph M. Terrell
Will Strickland	Black	30	M	March 10, 1904	Madison	Murder	Dilsey Hudson, black	Joseph M. Terrell
Jim Jenkins	Black	30	M	April 16, 1904	Colquitt	Murder	Annie Taylor, black (wife)	Joseph M. Terrell
Henry Curry	Black		M	June 15, 1904	Wayne	Murder	Albert Smith, black	Joseph M. Terrell
Willie Calvin	Black		M	July 8, 1904	Chatham	Murder	Rosa Pace, 32, black (girlfriend)	Joseph M. Terrell
Elton Attaway Gray	Black	27	M	July 26, 1904	Dooly	Murder	Rosa Gray, black (wife)	Joseph M. Terrell
Smith Brooks	Black	22	M	September 19, 1904	Monroe	Murder	John M. Maddox, 45, white (judge)	Joseph M. Terrell
George Ponder	Black	66	M	September 23, 1904	Walton	Murder	Tip Davis, black (wife)	Joseph M. Terrell
Alex Braddy	Black	44	M	September 24, 1904	Warren	Murder	Vinie Braddy, 32, black (wife)	Joseph M. Terrell
Sampson Flournoy	Black	33	M	November 1, 1904	Burke	Murder	James Minor and Evans Tomlin, 26 and 18, white	Joseph M. Terrell
Guy Reed	Black	20	M	December 27, 1904	McDuffie	Murder	Radford Gunn Story, 46, white	Joseph M. Terrell
John Butler	Black	22	M	December 27, 1904	McDuffie	Murder	Radford Gunn Story, 46, white	Joseph M. Terrell
Whitley Williford	Black		M	January 13, 1905	Mitchell	Murder	Harmon West, 46, white (posse member)	Joseph M. Terrell
Lige West	Black	28	M	January 20, 1905	Houston	Murder	Micky West, 30, black (wife)	Joseph M. Terrell
Bud Hilburn	Black	42	M	February 3, 1905	Emanuel	Murder	Abraham H. Durden, 20, white (court bailiff)	Joseph M. Terrell
Courtney Baker	Black		M	March 7, 1905	Floyd	Murder	Carrie Garrett Baker, black (wife)	Joseph M. Terrell
Bob Sutherland	Black	18	M	March 7, 1905	Floyd	Murder	James Bronner and Bettie Hadden, black	Joseph M. Terrell
Noah Anderson	Black	33	M	March 22, 1905	Decatur	Murder	Henry Anderson, 64, black (father)	Joseph M. Terrell
Tobe Thornton	Black	24	M	April 27, 1905	Webster	Rape (Note: Victim had to be institutionalized for the rest of her life after the crime.)	Margaret Dismukes, 51, white	Joseph M. Terrell
Greeley Phillips	Black	28	M	May 5, 1905	Coweta	Murder	Mary Lasseter, black	Joseph M. Terrell
Will Sims	Black		M	June 2, 1905	Rockdale	Murder	Rosa Sims, black (wife)	Joseph M. Terrell
Peter Thomas	Black		M	June 2, 1905	Dougherty	Murder	John Manier, white (Pretoria marshal)	Joseph M. Terrell
Algernon Bachelor	Black		M	November 13, 1905	Walton	Murder	John Eugene Darby, 27, white (constable)	Joseph M. Terrell
Jim Walker	Black	23	M	December 8, 1905	Fulton	Rape	Alice Moore, 46, white	Joseph M. Terrell
Will Aiken	Black	44	M	January 5, 1906	Tattnall	Murder	Edwin Aiken, 28, black (son)	Joseph M. Terrell
Dock Hardy	Black		M	January 12, 1906	Heard	Murder	Max Wilson, white	Joseph M. Terrell
Essie Johnson	Black	21	M	February 16, 1906	Terrell	Murder-Robbery	Eliza Banks, 82, black	Joseph M. Terrell
Richard Anderson	Black	15	M	March 16, 1906	Wilkes	Rape	Lucy Alva Roberts, 5, white	Joseph M. Terrell
Will Gordon	Black		M	May 15, 1906	Gwinnett	Murder	Rachel Hunt, 17, black	Joseph M. Terrell
Huss Grant	Black		M	May 18, 1906	Morgan	Murder	Mary Johnson, black	Joseph M. Terrell
John Graham	Black	28	M	May 18, 1906	Sumter	Murder	Horace Morgan, 55, black	Joseph M. Terrell
George Broughton	Black	30	M	May 18, 1906	Sumter	Murder	Harry Horne, 61, black (father-in-law)	Joseph M. Terrell
Jeff Hillhouse	Black		M	September 7, 1906	Houston	Murder-Rape	Florida King, 15, black	Joseph M. Terrell
Jonas Hicks	Black		M	September 7, 1906	Sumter	Murder	Jarrett J. Davis, 43, white	Joseph M. Terrell
Bob Moore	Black	40	M	September 10, 1906	White	Rape	Annie Ruby Hood, 8, white	Joseph M. Terrell
Bird Earl	Black	36	M	October 19, 1906	Morgan	Murder	Cora Jordan Earl, black (wife)	Joseph M. Terrell
Sims Devereaux	Black		M	November 16, 1906	Baldwin	Murder	Jack Rushins, 58, black	Joseph M. Terrell
J. C. Rawlins	White	52	M	December 4, 1906	Lowndes	Murder	Willie and Annie Carter, 17 and 16, white	Joseph M. Terrell
Alf Moore	Black		M	December 4, 1906	Lowndes	Murder	Willie and Annie Carter, 17 and 16, white	Joseph M. Terrell
Will Perkins	Black		M	December 29, 1906	Effingham	Murder	Jesse Zeigler, black (Note: Serial killer, previously murdered two other black men.)	Joseph M. Terrell
John Bullard	White	40	M	March 1, 1907	Cobb	Murder	Ruby Bullard, 17, white (daughter)	Joseph M. Terrell
Robert Henderson	Black		M	May 23, 1907	Turner	Murder-Robbery	George W. May, 55, white	Joseph M. Terrell
Buck High	Black	15	M	May 29, 1907	Henry	Rape	Laura Daniel, 4, white	Joseph M. Terrell
Will Johnson	Black		M	June 14, 1907	Fulton	Rape	Georgia Hembree, 28, white (Note: Serial rapist, also attacked Ethel and Mabel Lawrence (26 and 14, white) and Aletha Camp (30, white) and also murdered Amos J. Moody (38, white).)	Joseph M. Terrell
John Mitchell	Black	26	M	June 21, 1907	Cobb	Murder	Nashmoore Johnson, black	Joseph M. Terrell
George Bundrick	White	45	M	June 21, 1907	Crisp (Note: Change of venue from Dooly County.)	Murder	John H. Shrouder, 26, white	Joseph M. Terrell
Will Price	Black	30	M	August 15, 1907	Randolph	Rape	Sarah Burks, 14, white	M. Hoke Smith
Will Nix	Black		M	August 16, 1907	Washington	Murder	Robert B. Jackson, 52, white (Note: Also murdered Aaron Taylor (18, black) during the same crime.)	M. Hoke Smith
Matthew Howell	Black	26	M	December 13, 1907	Gwinnett	Murder	James B. Rainey, 45, white (bailiff)	M. Hoke Smith
Arthur Glover	White	55	M	January 31, 1908	Richmond	Murder	Maude Dean Williamson, 27, white (girlfriend)	M. Hoke Smith
Wes Summerlin	Black		M	February 14, 1908	Carroll	Murder-Robbery	Jethro Jones, 70, white	M. Hoke Smith
Charles Summerlin	Black		M	February 14, 1908	Carroll	Murder-Robbery	Jethro Jones, 70, white	M. Hoke Smith
Will Rogers	White	25	M	February 25, 1908	Chatham	Murder	Ella Simmons Rogers, 28, white (wife)	M. Hoke Smith
Lee Holmes	Black	29	M	February 28, 1908	McIntosh	Murder	Dr. Emery A. Sands, 21, white	M. Hoke Smith
Andrew Johnson	Black		M	March 18, 1908	Fulton	Murder	James A. Manier, 39, white (police officer)	M. Hoke Smith
Ingram Canida	Black	20	M	March 20, 1908	Troup	Rape	Roxie Anna Hargett Jones, 56, white	M. Hoke Smith
Mack Brown	Black		M	March 20, 1908	Mitchell	Rape	Victoria Hollis, 8, black	M. Hoke Smith
Robert Golatt	Black	42	M	April 17, 1908	Columbia	Murder	Edie Moore, 40, black (common-law wife)	M. Hoke Smith
Henry Campbell	Black	54	M	May 8, 1908	Gwinnett	Murder	Ella Hudson, 27, black (Note: Also murdered her 3-month-old baby.)	M. Hoke Smith
Porter Cooper	Black		M	May 15, 1908	Hancock	Murder	Sissy Tallington Cooper, black (wife)	M. Hoke Smith
Sonnie Williams	Black		M	June 19, 1908	Miller	Murder	Almond Ward, black	M. Hoke Smith
Harry Lyles	White	27	M	June 23, 1908	Ware	Murder	Eula Johnson Lyles and unknown, 17 years and 4 months, white (wife and child)	M. Hoke Smith
John Harper	White		M	June 28, 1908	Murray	Murder	Ben Keith, white (sheriff)	M. Hoke Smith
Neal Ryles	Black	42	M	September 11, 1908	Appling	Rape	Lizzie Middleton Overstreet, 37, white	M. Hoke Smith
Leon Harrison	Black	23	M	October 9, 1908	Jackson	Murder	Lina Daniel, 28, black	M. Hoke Smith
Jim Bennett	Black	23	M	October 15, 1908	Fayette	Murder	Daniel McEachern, 48, white	M. Hoke Smith
George Joiner	Black	21	M	December 11, 1908	Emanuel	Murder	Mary Almeda Ricks Joiner, black (wife)	M. Hoke Smith
Fletcher Willis	Black		M	December 28, 1908	Houston	Murder	James H. Hall, 30, white	M. Hoke Smith
Lucius Truitt	Black		M	January 2, 1909	Troup	Murder	Dock Tatum, 33, black	M. Hoke Smith
Isaiah Hicks	Black	18	M	June 1, 1909	Macon	Murder	Thomas Banks Lofley, 34, white	M. Hoke Smith
Jim Jones	Black		M	June 11, 1909	Jenkins	Murder	Jim Brown, black	M. Hoke Smith
Jim Wiggins	Black		M	July 8, 1909	Dooly	Murder	Belle Allen Wiggins, black (wife)	Joseph Mackey Brown
Marshall Lewis	Black	23	M	July 9, 1909	Berrien (Note: Murder committed in present-day Cook County.)	Murder	Robert Clifford Rutherford, 26, white (Lenox assistant postmaster)	Joseph Mackey Brown
Edward Fallis	Black	21	M	July 9, 1909	Wilkes	Murder	Robert Johnson, black	Joseph Mackey Brown
William Hawkins	Black		M	October 1, 1909	Clarke	Murder	Mary Hawkins, black (wife)	Joseph Mackey Brown
Syl Bynum	Black	20	M	October 27, 1909	Clay	Murder-Robbery	John B. Turner, 41, black	Joseph Mackey Brown
Bud Whitman	Black		M	November 5, 1909	Clarke	Murder	Vonderau Kennon, 25, white	Joseph Mackey Brown
J. B. Kellogg	Black	20	M	November 19, 1909	Cherokee	Murder	James E. Landers, 25, white (Note: Had just finished a 1-year chain gang sentence for a similar murder.)	Joseph Mackey Brown
Henry Bell	Black	20	M	December 30, 1909	Terrell	Murder	Willie Jackson, 24, black	Joseph Mackey Brown

=== 1910s ===
Name	Race	Age	Sex	Date of execution	County	Crime	Victim(s)	Governor
Willard Webb	Black	29	M	February 18, 1910	Cobb	Rape	Exie Brown, 18, white	Joseph Mackey Brown
George Burge	White	32	M	April 15, 1910	Fulton	Murder	Mary Lovie Sikes Britton Burge, 32, white (wife) (Note: Also attempted to murder his stepson, Frank Britton.)	Joseph Mackey Brown
Julius Daggett	Black	64	M	April 19, 1910	Columbia	Murder-Robbery	Zachariah Kendrick, 78, white	Joseph Mackey Brown
John Suple	Black	24	M	May 7, 1910	Jeff Davis	Murder	Simon Lee, black	Joseph Mackey Brown
Henry Patterson	Black	44	M	May 13, 1910	Sumter	Murder	Capt. W. F. McRae, 45, white	Joseph Mackey Brown
Howard Harris	Black	21	M	May 20, 1910	Thomas	Rape	Effie McMillan Dutton, 17, white	Joseph Mackey Brown
Walter Thomas	Black		M	June 10, 1910	Troup	Rape	Leola King, 7, black	Joseph Mackey Brown
Jesse Cook	Black	18	M	June 17, 1910	Bartow	Murder-Robbery	Joseph C. Cannon, 52, black	Joseph Mackey Brown
Frank Brooks	Black	21	M	June 17, 1910	Fulton	Murder-Burglary	Steve Morris, 28, black	Joseph Mackey Brown
Charles Walker	Black	32	M	July 29, 1910	DeKalb	Murder-Robbery	Samuel Thomas Brown, 27, white	Joseph Mackey Brown
Charles Scott	Black	22	M	October 28, 1910	Washington	Murder	Henry Harris, 21, black	Joseph Mackey Brown
Jake DeVauss	Black	35	M	November 10, 1910	Coffee	Murder	Charlie McKinnon, white	Joseph Mackey Brown
Charlie Whitfield	Black	20	M	December 10, 1910	Washington	Murder	Maggie Lula Babb, black	Joseph Mackey Brown
Calvin Johnston	Black	19	M	February 8, 1911	Burke	Murder-Robbery	Harvey Jones, 61, white	Joseph Mackey Brown
Edward Weaver	Black	30	M	April 14, 1911	DeKalb	Murder-Robbery	Samuel Thomas Brown, 27, white	Joseph Mackey Brown
Harry Paschal	Black		M	June 9, 1911	Lincoln	Murder	Jim Jones, 29, black	Joseph Mackey Brown
John Withrow Jr.	White	23	M	June 9, 1911	Fannin	Murder	Callie Withrow, 19, white (wife)	Joseph Mackey Brown
Ed Jones	Black		M	June 9, 1911	Baker	Murder	Green Key, 19, black	Joseph Mackey Brown
Sam Swatson	Black	26	M	June 16, 1911	Fulton (Note: Change of venue from Muscogee County.)	Rape	Carrie Lee Watkins, 16, white	Joseph Mackey Brown
Thomas Webster	Black		M	July 17, 1911	Jackson	Rape	Dora Neese, 37, white	M. Hoke Smith
William Rouse	White	47	M	September 1, 1911	Worth	Murder	William Bailey, 43, white	M. Hoke Smith
Albert Matthews	Black	26	M	October 26, 1911	Monroe	Murder	Minnie Stephens Matthews, 21, black (wife)	M. Hoke Smith
Andrew Davis	Black		M	November 11, 1911	Calhoun	Murder	Lonsie Davis, black (wife)	M. Hoke Smith
James W. Gatlin	White	26	M	November 27, 1911	Camden	Murder-Burglary	Mary Randolph and Mary Randolph Jr., 13 (Mary Jr.), black	John M. Slaton
T. W. Walker	Black		M	December 5, 1911	Wilkes	Murder	Charles S. Hollenshead, 50, white	John M. Slaton
Thomas Jackson	Black		M	December 8, 1911	Lowndes	Murder	Gertrude Jason Jackson and Hannah Jason, black (wife and grandmother-in-law)	John M. Slaton
Bill Turner	Black	39	M	December 14, 1911	Butts	Murder	Jesse Singley, 20, white	John M. Slaton
Balus Merck	Black	55	M	December 28, 1911	Hall	Murder	Leah Merck, 51, black (wife) (Note: Also shot their 12-year-old adoptive child, unknown if fatally.)	John M. Slaton
Kid Glover	Black		M	January 16, 1912	Crisp	Murder	Charles West, black (Note: Fired into a crowd and fatally shot several people, apparently only tried for shooting West.)	John M. Slaton
Charles West	Black		M	February 20, 1912	Early	Murder	Henry W. Newberry, 31, white (Jakin town marshal)	Joseph Mackey Brown
Will Simms	Black		M	February 20, 1912	Early	Murder-Burglary	Freeman Spence, 25, white	Joseph Mackey Brown
William Walker	White	34	M	March 8, 1912	Bibb	Murder	Alma Johnson Walker, 24, white (wife)	Joseph Mackey Brown
Will Bell	Black		M	March 29, 1912	Bibb	Murder	Emma Bell, black (wife) (Note: Also murdered his brother-in-law.)	Joseph Mackey Brown
Hezekiah Stevens	Black	21	M	March 29, 1912	Clarke	Murder	Essie M. Stevens, 21, black (wife)	Joseph Mackey Brown
E. B. Alford	White	38	M	May 10, 1912	Bibb	Murder	Carrie Exum Alford and Martha Exum, white (wife and mother-in-law)	Joseph Mackey Brown
Tom McCrary	Black	35	M	May 14, 1912	Crisp	Murder	Clarence Beasley, 18, white	Joseph Mackey Brown
Lige Burdine	Black	31	M	May 24, 1912	Thomas	Rape	Female, 6, black	Joseph Mackey Brown
Mack Strickland	Black	21	M	August 23, 1912	Gwinnett	Murder-Rape	Susie Parsons, 13, black	Joseph Mackey Brown
John Hegwood	White	26	M	September 6, 1912	Habersham	Murder	John Whittemore, white	Joseph Mackey Brown
Ernest Knox	Black	17	M	October 25, 1912	Forsyth	Murder-Rape	Mae Crow, 19, white	Joseph Mackey Brown
Oscar Daniels	Black	17	M	October 25, 1912	Forsyth	Murder-Rape	Mae Crow, 19, white	Joseph Mackey Brown
Jack Baldwin	Black	33	M	November 8, 1912	Stewart	Murder	Alice Scott, 37, black	Joseph Mackey Brown
Leonard Lewis	Black		M	November 8, 1912	Douglas	Murder	Unidentified male, black	Joseph Mackey Brown
Oscar Clyde	Black	26	M	December 4, 1912	Bibb	Murder	Ophelia Howard Clyde and Charles Howard, 22 and 26, black (wife and brother-in-law)	Joseph Mackey Brown
Noble Walker	Black	24	M	December 13, 1912	Thomas	Murder	Sarah Green Walker, black (wife)	Joseph Mackey Brown
Robert L. Clay	White	28	M	December 13, 1912	Fulton	Murder	Katherine Hughes Clay, 24, white (wife)	Joseph Mackey Brown
J. Edward Brazzell	White	43	M	January 3, 1913	Richmond	Murder	Carrie Bell Duncan, 16, white	Joseph Mackey Brown
Solomon Williams	Black	22	M	January 17, 1913	Chatham	Murder	Ann Rivers, 38, black (mother-in-law)	Joseph Mackey Brown
John Phillips	Black		M	February 7, 1913	Tift	Murder	James Smith, 17, white	Joseph Mackey Brown
Will Thompson	Black	23	M	May 2, 1913	Jefferson	Murder	Claude Humphrey, 27, white	Joseph Mackey Brown
Carter Tompkins	Black	22	M	May 23, 1913	Putnam	Murder	Jerry Price, 31, black	Joseph Mackey Brown
Jake Crawford	Black		M	May 23, 1913	Putnam	Murder	John Henry Powell, black	Joseph Mackey Brown
Oscar Dewberry	Black	24	M	July 11, 1913	Fulton	Murder	Horace Dodson, 15, white	John M. Slaton
Frank Collier	Black	24	M	August 22, 1913	Chatham	Murder	Morris Robinson, 26, black	John M. Slaton
William Varner	Black	28	M	September 29, 1913	Newton	Murder	Rufus James, 9, black	John M. Slaton
Ed Kitchens	Black	28	M	October 17, 1913	Washington	Murder	Henry A. Brantley, 33, white	John M. Slaton
William Gathright	Black	35	M	November 14, 1913	Gwinnett	Murder	George L. Seay, 33, white	John M. Slaton
David McLaughlin	Black		M	January 24, 1914	Laurens	Murder	Selma Burney Davis, black (mother-in-law)	John M. Slaton
George Smith	Black	41	M	February 6, 1914	Lowndes	Murder	Jesse Simmons, 34, black	John M. Slaton
William Duncan	Black	23	M	February 12, 1914	Houston	Murder	Pace Reed, black	John M. Slaton
Nick Wilburn	White	25	M	June 12, 1914	Jones	Murder	James H. King, 36, white	John M. Slaton
Robert Paschall	Black	17	M	June 19, 1914	Fulton (Note: Change of venue from Jefferson County.)	Murder	Ellie Irby, 25, white	John M. Slaton
George Hart	Black	15	M	June 19, 1914	Fulton	Murder	Ellie Irby, 25, white	John M. Slaton
Will Hart	Black	16	M	June 19, 1914	Fulton	Murder	Ellie Irby, 25, white	John M. Slaton
Jim Cantrell	White	26	M	July 31, 1914	Hall	Murder	Arthur C. Hawkins, white	John M. Slaton
Bartow Cantrell	White	17	M	July 31, 1914	Hall	Murder	Arthur C. Hawkins, white	John M. Slaton
John Davis	Black	40	M	September 4, 1914	Muscogee	Murder-Robbery	Oscar McGinty, 31, white	John M. Slaton
Miles Cribb	White	31	M	September 11, 1914	Turner	Murder	Mary Ann Hancock, 59, white (mother-in-law) (Note: Also murdered his wife, 27-year-old Viola L. Cribb.)	John M. Slaton
W. I. Humphrey	White	65	M	September 11, 1914	Whitfield	Murder	Joseph S. Pritchett, 63, white	John M. Slaton
Ransom Williams	Black		M	January 15, 1915	Dougherty (Note: Change of venue from Calhoun County.)	Rape	Female, white	John M. Slaton
Flemming Jackson	Black	20	M	January 15, 1915	Mitchell	Murder	Will Griner, 28, white (deputy sheriff)	John M. Slaton
Burrett Hickman	Black		M	January 29, 1915	Fulton	Murder	Howard G. Bennett, 24, white (railroad detective)	John M. Slaton
James Hill	Black	43	M	March 16, 1915	Crisp	Murder	Donald Forehand, 19, white	John M. Slaton
Luther Stevens	Black	17	M	March 19, 1915	Crisp	Murder	Thomas Ephraim Gleaton, 59, white	John M. Slaton
Will Bird	Black	24	M	April 9, 1915	Jasper	Murder	Sabrie Brunson, black	John M. Slaton
Alf Goolsby	Black	47	M	June 9, 1915	Brooks	Murder	Mitch Davis, 32, black (brother-in-law)	John M. Slaton
Henry Floyd	Black		M	August 6, 1915	Jenkins	Murder	Bertha Perdue, black	Nathaniel Edwin Harris
Will McGriff	Black		M	August 19, 1915	Colquitt	Murder	William S. Washington, 31, white (Note: Also killed two other black men, Sylvester Phinney and Dan Showers, on the same day (July 11, 1911). Possible serial killer; confessed to at least eleven murders while a fugitive shortly before his execution, including a deputy sheriff in Tallahassee, Florida, although the veracity of this claim is doubted.)	Nathaniel Edwin Harris
Joe Persons	Black	14 (Note: Believed to be the youngest person executed in the United States during the 20th century. His age is variously given as between 12 and 15 years old, likely at the younger end of the range due to his weight only being 65 or 75 pounds. He was also reported as being 13 at the time of the crime.)	M	September 24, 1915	Butts	Rape	Female, 8, white	Nathaniel Edwin Harris
Frank Northfoot	Black	24	M	September 25, 1915	Early	Murder	Hattie Northfoot, 19, black (wife)	Nathaniel Edwin Harris
Clifford Sims	Black	27	M	October 26, 1915	Lee	Murder	Catherine Boston, black	Nathaniel Edwin Harris
Guy Young	Black		M	November 8, 1915	Taliaferro	Murder	Charles Rackley, 30, white	Nathaniel Edwin Harris
Jake Turner	Black		M	November 8, 1915	Taliaferro	Murder	Charles Rackley, 30, white	Nathaniel Edwin Harris
Sam Hardin	Black		M	November 8, 1915	Taliaferro	Murder	Charles Rackley, 30, white	Nathaniel Edwin Harris
Will Johnson	Black		M	December 17, 1915	Bulloch	Murder	Cuyler Green, 56, black	Nathaniel Edwin Harris
Lee Ingram	Black		M	December 22, 1915	Randolph	Murder	Eliza Ingram, black (estranged wife)	Nathaniel Edwin Harris
Will Brown	Black		M	January 28, 1916	Rabun	Murder	Will Sweet, black (Note: Fugitive from North Carolina for the murder of his wife; had been sentenced to 30 years in prison but escaped two years earlier.)	Nathaniel Edwin Harris
Lon Lindsey	White	34	M	May 19, 1916	Clay	Murder	Florence McCorkle Lindsey, 31, white (wife) (Note: Also murdered their child.)	Nathaniel Edwin Harris
Gideon McKinney	Black	24	M	May 19, 1916	Mitchell	Murder	Susie McKinney, 16, black (wife)	Nathaniel Edwin Harris
Robert Kitchens	Black	16	M	June 2, 1916	Washington	Murder	Henry A. Brantley, 33, white	Nathaniel Edwin Harris
Wes Story	Black	53	M	July 14, 1916	Harris	Murder	Cherry Huling, 26, black	Nathaniel Edwin Harris
Charlie Mosby	Black		M	July 17, 1916	Calhoun	Murder	Earl S. Cunningham, 36, white	Nathaniel Edwin Harris
Will Lampkin	Black		M	August 4, 1916	Decatur	Murder	Annie Lampkin, black (wife)	Nathaniel Edwin Harris
John Wright	Black		M	October 20, 1916	Harris	Murder	Annie Wright, 35, black (wife)	Nathaniel Edwin Harris
Harris Sutton	Black	16	M	January 12, 1917	Henry	Rape	Female, 10, white	Nathaniel Edwin Harris
Will Miles	Black		M	January 29, 1917	Fulton	Murder-Robbery	John H. Moore, 41, white	Nathaniel Edwin Harris
Tom Shirley	Black	23	M	February 9, 1917	Franklin	Murder	Ottis Alkerman, black	Nathaniel Edwin Harris
Clarence Dennis	Black	32	M	February 16, 1917	Pike	Murder	Sam Dennis, 59, black (father)	Nathaniel Edwin Harris
Sam Couch	Black	32	M	May 25, 1917	Harris	Murder	Hollis Dewberry, 16, black	Nathaniel Edwin Harris
Frank Hugle	Black	15	M	July 20, 1917	Fulton	Murder-Robbery	John H. Moore, 41, white	Hugh Dorsey
Charles Williams	Black		M	August 3, 1917	Decatur	Murder	Minnon Edwards, 23, black	Hugh Dorsey
Oscar Allen	Black		M	September 18, 1917	Taliaferro	Murder-Burglary	Seaborn J. Jones and Sarah Chester, 58 and 42, white and black	Hugh Dorsey
Ras Jones	Black		M	May 24, 1918	Miller	Murder	Richard Blackshear, black	Hugh Dorsey
John Thompson	White	23	M	July 26, 1918	Troup	Murder	William Brewer Shirley, 42, white (sheriff)	Hugh Dorsey
John Burke	Black		M	October 23, 1918	Macon	Murder	Joe Crittle, black	Hugh Dorsey
Bart Goodwin	White	31	M	November 8, 1918	Polk	Murder	Ella Stubbs Goodwin, 23 (wife)	Hugh Dorsey
George Wilkerson	Black	31	M	November 22, 1918	Burke	Murder	Charlie Bradley, 36, black	Hugh Dorsey
Clifford F. Polk	White	37	M	November 29, 1918	Baldwin	Murder	Maude Roberts Polk, 35, white (wife)	Hugh Dorsey
Henry Wilkerson	Black	26	M	December 6, 1918	Burke	Murder	Charlie Bradley, 36, black	Hugh Dorsey
Joe West	Black	20	M	May 16, 1919	Thomas	Rape	Rosa L. Collins, 26, white	Hugh Dorsey
Paul Bates	Black	23	M	May 23, 1919	Screven	Murder	Willie Grady Oliver, 25, white	Hugh Dorsey
Tom Steele	Black	27	M	September 5, 1919	Thomas	Murder	James Anderson, 21, black	Hugh Dorsey
West E. Roundtree	Black	30	M	September 12, 1919	Brooks	Rape	Female, 14, white	Hugh Dorsey
Bartow Nix	White	31	M	November 7, 1919	Muscogee	Murder-Robbery	Leslie Alexander and Jesse Allen Everidge, 41 and 40, white (Note: Serial killer, previously murdered John T. and Jeff Edwards (54 and 25, white) at age 17 and sentenced to life imprisonment but was pardoned three years later.)	Hugh Dorsey

=== 1920s ===
Name	Race	Age	Sex	Date of execution	County	Crime	Victim(s)	Governor
William Daniel	Black	51	M	January 2, 1920	Pulaski	Murder	Cora and Lewis Brown, 14 and 8, black	Hugh Dorsey
Hollis Landers	White	19	M	May 7, 1920	Jackson	Murder	Clifford Davis Barber, 38, white (sheriff)	Hugh Dorsey
Charles Jasper	Black	18	M	August 20, 1920	Fulton	Rape	Female, white	Hugh Dorsey
Israelite Jones	Black	24	M	November 26, 1920	Richmond	Murder-Robbery	Owen Conlin, 71, white	Hugh Dorsey
Broughton Simon	Black	35	M	February 25, 1921	Lowndes	Rape	Female, white (Note: Admitted to attempting rape on two girls that same night.)	Hugh Dorsey
Israel Waters	Black	25	M	June 3, 1921	Bryan	Rape	Female, 13, black	Hugh Dorsey
Lemon Wright	Black	19	M	June 3, 1921	Chatham (Note: Change of venue from Brooks County.)	Rape-Burglary	Bertha Simmons Smith, 22, white (Note: Her husband, 25-year-old C. Hampton Smith, was also murdered, and Mrs. Smith was pregnant and had a miscarriage as a result of her injuries.)	Hugh Dorsey
Jack L. Kelloy	White	25	M	July 15, 1921	Spalding	Murder-Robbery	Leroy S. Trexler, 28, white	Thomas W. Hardwick
Julius King	Black	18	M	July 19, 1921	Atkinson	Murder	Seaborn Alonzo Lastinger, 59, white	Thomas W. Hardwick
Early Bradley	Black	24	M	August 5, 1921	Stephens	Murder	Charity Watson, 13, black (sister-in-law)	Thomas W. Hardwick
Wesley Cooper	Black	32	M	November 18, 1921	Gwinnett	Murder	William A. Cooper, 45, white	Thomas W. Hardwick
Louis Murray	Black	20	M	December 16, 1921	Harris	Murder	O. S. Williams, 50, white	Thomas W. Hardwick
John Lacy	Black	17	M	December 21, 1921	Richmond	Rape	Female, 8, white	Thomas W. Hardwick
Claude Dunn	Black	42	M	January 24, 1922	McDuffie	Murder	Gustavius E. Reese, 67, white	Thomas W. Hardwick
William Ravenal	Black	51	M	May 5, 1922	Hart	Rape	Female, elderly, white	Thomas W. Hardwick
Henry Langston Jr.	Black	21	M	May 12, 1922	Morgan	Murder	Henry Moody, 70+, black	Thomas W. Hardwick
Jim Denson	Black	20	M	June 16, 1922	Wilkinson	Rape	Female, 72, white	Thomas W. Hardwick
Luke McDonald	Black	37	M	September 1, 1922	Fulton	Murder	Minnie Cowan, 24, black (girlfriend)	Thomas W. Hardwick
Frank Dupre	White	19	M	September 1, 1922	Fulton	Murder	Irby C. Walker, 28, white (private detective)	Thomas W. Hardwick
Ed Dunbar	Black	37	M	March 2, 1923	Bryan	Murder	Steven W. Phillips Jr., 52, white	Thomas W. Hardwick
Buster Strickland	Black	18	M	March 9, 1923	Hall	Rape	Female, white	Thomas W. Hardwick
George Baker	White	23	M	April 27, 1923	Walker	Murder	Joseph W. Morton, 66, white (deputy sheriff)	Thomas W. Hardwick
Walter Lee	Black	19	M	August 3, 1923	Chatham	Rape	Female, 30, white	Clifford Walker
Joe Bonner	Black	30	M	August 3, 1923	Jones	Murder-Burglary	Albert Sidney Jones, 58, white	Clifford Walker
Seab Johnson	Black	21	M	August 10, 1923	Emanuel	Murder	Three people, black (Note: His 25-year-old wife Ethel Cowart Johnston, 18-year-old sister-in-law Mattie Cowart Phillips, and 6-year-old niece Mary Walker.)	Clifford Walker
John Henry Walker	Black	21	M	August 17, 1923	Spalding	Murder	Frank Epps, 27, black	Clifford Walker
Evans McDowell	Black	23	M	November 2, 1923	Butts	Murder-Robbery	Charles Anderson Pittman, 68, white	Clifford Walker
James Satterfield	White	42	M	May 24, 1924	Fulton	Murder	Robert Henry Hart, 44, white (brother-in-law)	Clifford Walker
Fleming Lynch	Black	21	M	July 24, 1924	Butts	Murder-Robbery	Charles Anderson Pittman, 68, white	Clifford Walker
Harrison Brown	Black	15	M	August 15, 1924	Upson	Murder	Oscar Mann, 23, black	Clifford Walker

== Electrocution ==
On August 6, 1924, the state senate voted 26 to 21 to pass a new law replacing local hangings with centralized electrocution, which was then signed by the state governor on the 15th. Final tests on the new electric chair, nicknamed "Old Sparky", installed at the state farm in Milledgeville, were performed on September 12, with a special three-switch mechanism being used as the new protocols stated that "the warden" (of which there were three) had to turn it on; the first execution occurred the following day. After the creation of the new state prison in Reidsville, the electric chair was moved there in 1937, with the state's new execution chamber being located on the fifth floor of the prison's tower.

Seven further local hangings were carried out after August 1924 for defendants charged prior to the introduction of electrocution.

Executions by hanging

Name	Race	Age	Sex	Date of execution	County	Crime	Victim(s)	Governor
Howard Hinton	Black	20	M	September 13, 1924	DeKalb	Rape-Robbery	Female, white	Clifford Walker
Warren Walters	White	56	M	September 19, 1924	Jeff Davis	Murder	Thomas Jordan Kersey, 47, white (Hazlehurst town marshal)	Clifford Walker
Will Hodge	Black	25	M	September 26, 1924	Thomas	Murder	Mattie Glenn Hodge, 26, black (wife)	Clifford Walker
Alex Williams	Black	31	M	May 15, 1925	Jones	Murder	Martha Pounds Williams, 30, black (wife)	Clifford Walker
Lee Currie	White	28	M	May 21, 1925	Toombs	Murder	Burleigh E. Phillips, 37, white	Clifford Walker
Frank Jackson	Black		M	September 26, 1925	Rabun	Murder	Holt Allen, black	Clifford Walker
Gervis Bloodworth	White	20	M	January 29, 1926	Muscogee	Murder-Robbery	Howard F. Underwood, 52, white	Clifford Walker
Willie Jones	White	19	M	January 29, 1926	Muscogee	Murder-Robbery	Howard F. Underwood, 52, white	Clifford Walker
Charlie Walton	Black	39	M	March 11, 1926	Fulton	Murder	Fred L. James, 28, white	Clifford Walker
Floyd McClelland	White	20	M	March 25, 1926	Putnam	Murder	William Crosby Wright, 65, white	Clifford Walker
Ted Coggleshell	White	21	M	March 25, 1926	Putnam	Murder	William Crosby Wright, 65, white	Clifford Walker
Mack Wooten	Black	52	M	May 18, 1926	Fulton	Murder	Dan Hall Williams, 35, white	Clifford Walker
Amos Stewart	Black	28	M	June 18, 1926	Worth	Murder	Dr. Ashton T. Ford, 60, white	Clifford Walker
Ed Glover	Black		M	September 9, 1926	Bibb	Murder	Hilda Smith and Elisha W. Wilson, 21 and 22, white	Clifford Walker
Tom Johnson	Black	48	M	September 24, 1926	Jefferson	Murder	Dessie Whigham Stone, 40, black	Clifford Walker
Pringle Williams	Black	17	M	October 8, 1926	Emanuel	Rape	Female, 14, white	Clifford Walker
James Johnson	Black		M	November 13, 1926	Fulton	Murder	Myrtle Amanda Tumlin, 48, white	Clifford Walker
Herbert Fennell	Black	30	M	June 3, 1927	Liberty	Murder	Viola Darden Fennell, 22, black (wife)	Clifford Walker
Mell Gore	White	22	M	June 3, 1927	Fulton	Murder-Robbery	William Henry Cheek, 37, white	Clifford Walker
Oscar Mars	White	46	M	June 6, 1927	Ben Hill	Murder	Jennie Belle Bentley Mars, 40, white (wife)	Clifford Walker
John Rounsaville	Black	20	M	July 12, 1927	Chattooga	Murder	George Rounsaville, 6 months, black (stepson)	Lamartine Griffin Hardman
Cellus Stewart	Black	35	M	July 15, 1927	Early	Murder	Abbie Gay, 35, black (girlfriend)	Lamartine Griffin Hardman
Mose Parker	Black	49	M	October 14, 1927	Pike	Murder	Cordelia Parker and Virginia Pierce, 20 and 16, black (daughter and niece)	Lamartine Griffin Hardman
Wilbur Galloway	Black	28	M	October 14, 1927	Dodge	Murder-Robbery	Will T. and Edna Wingo Andrews, 27 and 16, white	Lamartine Griffin Hardman
Lee Chamblee	Black	40	M	October 14, 1927	Bartow	Murder	Zack Gordon, 30, black	Lamartine Griffin Hardman
Roy Pryor	Black	24	M	October 26, 1927	Monroe	Rape	Female, 50+, white	Lamartine Griffin Hardman
George Clark	Black	26	M	November 11, 1927	Jasper	Rape	Female, white	Lamartine Griffin Hardman
John Sanders	Black	41	M	November 18, 1927	Fulton	Rape	Female, white	Lamartine Griffin Hardman
Garfield Fuller	Black	44	M	January 13, 1928	Pike	Murder-Robbery	Lillie Belle McDowell Davis, 22, black (Note: Confessed at his execution to two murders, two assaults (unknown if fatal), and a rape.)	Lamartine Griffin Hardman
Albert Quinn	Black	25	M	January 20, 1928	Terrell	Murder	James W. Sutton, 47, white (Note: Confessed to murdering a black woman in Florida two years prior at his execution without becoming a suspect.)	Lamartine Griffin Hardman
Robert Coates	Black	36	M	February 21, 1928	Jefferson	Murder	Lilly Bell Coates, 33, black (wife)	Lamartine Griffin Hardman
Henry Ellis	Black	25	M	April 18, 1928	Fulton	Murder	John Taylor, 23, black	Lamartine Griffin Hardman
Edgar Price	Black	24	M	May 4, 1928	Grady	Murder	Buster Gurley and Jim Butler, 35 and 50, black	Lamartine Griffin Hardman
James E. Grant	Black	27	M	May 18, 1928	Fulton	Murder	Jesse L. Ferguson, 71, white	Lamartine Griffin Hardman
Charlie Hicks	Black	21	M	June 8, 1928	Fulton	Murder	Jesse L. Ferguson, 71, white	Lamartine Griffin Hardman
Robert Jones	Black	22	M	June 28, 1928	Bibb	Murder	Wesley P. Short, 72, white	Lamartine Griffin Hardman
Medie McCloud	Black	29	M	July 6, 1928	Decatur	Murder	Samuel Brinson Arline, 36, white (Bainbridge police officer)	Lamartine Griffin Hardman
Harold Hammond	White	36	M	July 6, 1928	Fulton	Murder	Lottie Belle and Lloyd Ingram, 19 years and 14 months, white	Lamartine Griffin Hardman
Preddie Taylor	Black	33	M	July 13, 1928	Fulton	Murder-Robbery	William H. Cleveland, 58, white	Lamartine Griffin Hardman
Sam Gower	White	42	M	July 13, 1928	Gwinnett	Murder	James and John Benefield, 55 and 9, white	Lamartine Griffin Hardman
Jim Moss	Black	27	M	August 3, 1928	Murray	Murder-Robbery	James Coleman Osborn, 40, white	Lamartine Griffin Hardman
Clifford Thompson	White	22	M	August 3, 1928	Murray	Murder-Robbery	James Coleman Osborn, 40, white	Lamartine Griffin Hardman
R. H. Sheppard	Native American	57	M	December 19, 1928	Fulton	Murder	F. Homer Fowler, 33, white	Lamartine Griffin Hardman
Willie Gilham	Black	21	M	January 18, 1929	Fulton	Murder-Robbery	Pat Daugherty, 46, black	Lamartine Griffin Hardman
Ed Capers	Black	19	M	January 18, 1929	Fulton	Murder-Robbery	Pat Daugherty, 46, black	Lamartine Griffin Hardman
Willie C. George	Black	23	M	January 18, 1929	Fulton	Murder-Robbery	Pat Daugherty, 46, black	Lamartine Griffin Hardman
Marshall Redding	Black	40	M	January 18, 1929	Coweta (Note: Change of venue from Meriwether County.)	Murder	William H. Callaway, 38, white (Manchester police chief)	Lamartine Griffin Hardman
Griff Grinstead	White	56	M	February 22, 1929	Montgomery	Murder	Homer Stuckey, 39, white (county police officer) (Note: Previously murdered his neighbor Alvah Burton (17, white) and was on executive furlough from the state prison visiting family at time of second murder.)	Lamartine Griffin Hardman
John Clark	Black	44	M	March 20, 1929	McIntosh	Murder	Clifford Anderson, 22, black	Lamartine Griffin Hardman
James Crumady	Black	25	M	May 17, 1929	Colquitt	Murder-Burglary	George Burt, 22, white	Lamartine Griffin Hardman
Jeff Dozier	Black	60	M	July 22, 1929	Floyd	Murder	Laura Arnold, 35, black (girlfriend) (Note: Serving a life sentence for the murder of his first wife, Mary J. Dozier; dated and murdered Arnold while a chain gang trusty.)	Lamartine Griffin Hardman
Homer C. Simpson	White	40	M	September 11, 1929	Glynn	Murder-Robbery	Carl Arp Perry, 40, white	Lamartine Griffin Hardman
Malcolm Morrow	White	31	M	September 11, 1929	Glynn	Murder-Robbery	Carl Arp Perry, 40, white	Lamartine Griffin Hardman
Alvin T. Merritt	White	26	M	October 4, 1929	Fulton	Rape	Female, 14, white (Note: Serial rapist, linked to 46 rapes in Fulton County dating back to January 1928.)	Lamartine Griffin Hardman
Willie Bryant	Black	23	M	October 4, 1929	Ware	Rape	Female, white	Lamartine Griffin Hardman
John Ellen	Black	41	M	January 27, 1930	Floyd	Murder	Emmett Puckett, 57, black	Lamartine Griffin Hardman
James Barker	Black	23	M	February 14, 1930	Bibb	Murder	Cosby H. Oxley, 58, white	Lamartine Griffin Hardman
Edmond Kelly	Black	28	M	February 21, 1930	Grady	Murder-Robbery	John Stephens, 63, black	Lamartine Griffin Hardman
Renty Screven	Black	50	M	March 21, 1930	Chatham	Murder	Rosa Screven, 22, black (daughter)	Lamartine Griffin Hardman
Lucius Jolley	Black	23	M	June 20, 1930	Bibb	Murder	Angeline Jolley, 25, black (wife)	Lamartine Griffin Hardman
Emory van Duzer	Black	24	M	June 27, 1930	Fulton	Murder	Sarah Edelstein Gould, 29, white	Lamartine Griffin Hardman
Wash Smith	White	21	M	November 22, 1930	Ben Hill	Murder	Jutist Lispust Wells, 43, white	Lamartine Griffin Hardman
Edgar Jenkins	Black	24	M	January 16, 1931	Early	Rape	Two females, 9 and 11, white	Lamartine Griffin Hardman
William Biggers	Black	36	M	January 27, 1931	Fulton	Murder-Robbery	Frank E. Marlin, 65, white	Lamartine Griffin Hardman
Henry West	Black	21	M	March 13, 1931	Floyd	Murder	Robert L. Huggins, 58, white	Lamartine Griffin Hardman
L. B. Newsome	Black	21	M	March 27, 1931	Peach	Murder	Tereseta Burnett, 13, black	Lamartine Griffin Hardman
Gilbert Glaze	Black	30	M	April 17, 1931	Fulton	Murder-Robbery	John B. McWhorter, 43, white	Lamartine Griffin Hardman
Willie Lee Cox	Black	27	M	April 17, 1931	Fulton	Murder-Robbery	John B. McWhorter, 43, white	Lamartine Griffin Hardman
Marvin Berry	Black	40	M	April 29, 1931	Early	Murder	William Harper, 65, black	Lamartine Griffin Hardman
Fred Griffin	Black	18	M	May 18, 1931	Fulton (Note: Crime committed in what was then Campbell County.)	Murder	Thomas W. Camp, 48, white (sheriff)	Lamartine Griffin Hardman
Burley Adams	White	34	M	May 22, 1931	Columbia	Murder	Walter R. Tolbert, 27, white (federal prohibition agent)	Lamartine Griffin Hardman
Willie Green	Black	27	M	May 22, 1931	Richmond	Murder	Alexander Adams, 20, black (Note: Serial killer, confessed to two other murders at his execution.)	Lamartine Griffin Hardman
Arthur Meyers	Black	28	M	June 17, 1931	Richmond	Murder	Robert Franklin Gunn, 30, white (railroad detective)	Lamartine Griffin Hardman
Eugene Dudley	Black	21	M	July 17, 1931	Walton	Murder	Jesse Williams, 29, black	Richard Russell Jr.
Willie Higgins	Black	28	M	September 11, 1931	Fulton	Murder	Bob Peyton, 20, black	Richard Russell Jr.
Robert L. Chisholm	Black	20	M	October 16, 1931	Peach	Rape	Female, white	Richard Russell Jr.
Clark Stevens	Black	24	M	October 16, 1931	Morgan	Murder	Percy Quinton McAdams (Madison police chief) and Will Mallory, 30 and 58, white	Richard Russell Jr.
William Searcy	Black	32	M	October 30, 1931	Talbot	Murder	Annie Mae Searcy, 31, black (wife)	Richard Russell Jr.
O. C. Hendrix	Black	34	M	October 30, 1931	Fulton	Murder-Robbery	Sam Nisson, 43, white	Richard Russell Jr.
English Gaskins	White	50	M	December 21, 1931	Candler	Murder	Jessie Hamm Gaskins, 25, white (wife)	Richard Russell Jr.
Major Johnson	White	44	M	February 9, 1932	Dougherty	Murder	Tobe Roberts, 35, white (brother-in-law)	Richard Russell Jr.
Eddie March	Black	16	M	February 9, 1932	Dougherty	Murder-Burglary	Walter E. Campbell, 53, white	Richard Russell Jr.
James Parker	White	38	M	April 8, 1932	Ware	Murder	Ethel Johns and Geraldine Parker, 25 years and 18 months, white (wife and daughter)	Richard Russell Jr.
Willie Rounds	Black	27	M	June 10, 1932	Houston	Murder	William Visco Gunter, 45, white	Richard Russell Jr.
Willie Jones	Black	24	M	August 8, 1932	Richmond	Murder-Burglary	Charles Henry Dunn, 56, white	Richard Russell Jr.
Albert Jackson	Black	22	M	October 7, 1932	Peach	Murder-Robbery	Jeffie Hartley, 84, white (Note: Also murdered Hartley's husband, 89-year-old Green M. Hartley.)	Richard Russell Jr.
Charlie Green Jr.	Black	32	M	October 28, 1932	Webster	Rape	Female, white (Note: Also raped her husband.)	Richard Russell Jr.
Paschall Baker	Black	32	M	October 28, 1932	Webster	Rape	Female, white	Richard Russell Jr.
William Hulsey	White	55	M	November 4, 1932	Polk	Murder	Three people, white (Note: Clifford Jones (32), Lige Harper (30), and Ernest McCullough (26).)	Richard Russell Jr.
Fred Hulsey	White	31	M	November 4, 1932	Polk	Murder	Three people, white	Richard Russell Jr.
John L. Humphreys	Black	21	M	November 5, 1932	Stewart	Murder	Fannie Lee Humphreys, 18, black (wife)	Richard Russell Jr.
J. C. Jackson	Black	23	M	November 16, 1932	Early	Murder	Michael Davis, 22, white	Richard Russell Jr.
Lawrence Welch	Black	46	M	April 4, 1933	Early	Murder	Lucy Welch, 29, black (wife)	Eugene Talmadge
Johnny Todd	Black	18	M	May 19, 1933	Greene	Murder	Willard Stephens Acree, 35, white	Eugene Talmadge
Pat Randall	Black		M	May 20, 1933	Randolph	Murder	Uriah Howell, 46, black	Eugene Talmadge
Raider Davis	Black	26	M	June 14, 1933	Fulton	Murder	Annie L. Henderson, 25, white (Note: Also murdered Hamp McGee (68, white) and William E. Stanley (78, white) as well as numerous unnamed black victims.)	Eugene Talmadge
Mose White	Black	18	M	August 11, 1933	Fulton	Murder	Frank C. Foster, 38, white (Atlanta detective)	Eugene Talmadge
Richard Sims	Black	18	M	August 11, 1933	Fulton	Murder	Frank C. Foster, 38, white (Atlanta detective)	Eugene Talmadge
Richard Morris	Black	18	M	August 11, 1933	Fulton	Murder	Frank C. Foster, 38, white (Atlanta detective)	Eugene Talmadge
Eugene Key	Black	25	M	August 25, 1933	Houston	Murder	Katie Key, 17, black (wife)	Eugene Talmadge
Thomas A. McCullough	White	58	M	August 25, 1933	Fayette	Murder	William B. Baker, 70, white	Eugene Talmadge
Rochelle Jackson	Black	27	M	September 8, 1933	Worth	Murder	Sarah Armstrong, 49, black (half-sister)	Eugene Talmadge
Harry Simpson	Black	34	M	October 20, 1933	Clinch	Murder	Marie Simpson, black (wife)	Eugene Talmadge
George Zuber	Black	29	M	October 27, 1933	Pickens	Murder	Lee Lindsey, 61, white (prison guard) (Note: Brooks was serving a life sentence for the murder of Lizzie Irvin (black) at the time of this murder, during an escape from a chain gang. At his execution, Brooks confessed to nine other murders.)	Eugene Talmadge
Grady Brooks	Black	19	M	October 27, 1933	Pickens	Murder	Lee Lindsey, 61, white (prison guard)	Eugene Talmadge
James F. Barbee	White	47	M	December 29, 1933	Pulaski	Murder	Delmar Cannon, 22, white	Eugene Talmadge
Will Osborne	Black	18	M	January 12, 1934	Fulton	Rape-Burglary	Female, white	Eugene Talmadge
Homer Lee Short	Black	24	M	March 2, 1934	Marion	Murder	Mose W. Dabbs, 35, white	Eugene Talmadge
Sandy Walker	Black	48	M	March 16, 1934	Worth	Murder-Robbery	Cliff and Bettie Kearce, 68 and 67, black	Eugene Talmadge
John Downer	Black	28	M	March 16, 1934	Elbert	Rape	Hazel Craft, 20, white	Eugene Talmadge
Miley W. Lively	White	47	M	April 20, 1934	Fulton	Murder	Rosa Kell Lively and Rettia Kell, 32 and 51, white (wife and mother-in-law)	Eugene Talmadge
Mack James	Black	29	M	May 11, 1934	Banks	Murder-Rape	Ida Whitfield, 23, white	Eugene Talmadge
Claude Hicks	Black	27	M	May 15, 1934	Fulton	Murder	Ray Schells, 19, black (Patrick's brother-in-law)	Eugene Talmadge
Hosea Patrick	Black	24	M	May 15, 1934	Fulton	Murder	Ray Schells, 19, black (Patrick's brother-in-law)	Eugene Talmadge
Reese Castleberry Jr.	Black	24	M	June 15, 1934	Pickens	Murder	Lee Lindsey, 61, white (prison guard)	Eugene Talmadge
Floyd South	Black	22	M	June 15, 1934	Fulton	Murder	Benjamin Gadlin, 44, white	Eugene Talmadge
Clifford Duncan	Black	26	M	September 14, 1934	Candler	Rape	Female, 11, white	Eugene Talmadge
Frank Johnson	Black	42	M	October 5, 1934	Johnson	Murder	John Waller, 47, white (prison guard)	Eugene Talmadge
Mose Street	Black	29	M	November 15, 1934	Chatham	Murder	James E. Roughen, 46, white (Savannah police officer)	Eugene Talmadge
Charlie Dodson	Black	17	M	January 21, 1935	Schley	Murder	Wilbur B. Souter, 41, white (Ellaville police chief)	Eugene Talmadge
J. T. Hammett	White	47	M	February 11, 1935	Troup	Murder	James Howard Boozer, 43, white (Note: Also murdered Michael O. Bowman (53, white) during the same crime.)	Eugene Talmadge
Archie Barfield	Black	22	M	February 15, 1935	Gwinnett	Murder	Eva Lamb Evans, 44, white	Eugene Talmadge
Rack Reese	Black	55	M	March 1, 1935	McDuffie	Murder-Robbery	James Black Stone, 42, white	Eugene Talmadge
John Henry Wright	Black	28	M	March 1, 1935	McDuffie	Murder-Robbery	James Black Stone, 42, white	Eugene Talmadge
Joseph Tucker	Black	29	M	March 5, 1935	Meriwether	Murder-Rape	Samuel and Mary deLong Hughes, both 59, white	Eugene Talmadge
Arthur Bell	Black	20	M	March 7, 1935	Webster	Murder-Robbery	Joseph J. King, 67, white (Note: Brown confessed to murdering J. J. King (white) at the execution.)	Eugene Talmadge
D. W. Brown	Black	25	M	March 7, 1935	Webster	Murder-Robbery	Joseph J. King, 67, white	Eugene Talmadge
Robert Hargroves	White	26	M	March 15, 1935	Effingham	Murder	James Zittrauer, 51, white	Eugene Talmadge
Victor Pierce	White	35	M	March 29, 1935	Clayton	Murder-Robbery	Stanley Dodge, 30, white	Eugene Talmadge
Albert Rivers	Black	41	M	April 5, 1935	Screven	Rape	Waldine Roberts, 9, white	Eugene Talmadge
Isiah Ashley	Black	18	M	April 5, 1935	Appling	Murder	John Wesley Holton, 38, white	Eugene Talmadge
Charlie Stone	Black	30	M	May 10, 1935	Fulton	Rape	Jennie Pierce, 43, white	Eugene Talmadge
Henry Harden	Black	24	M	May 10, 1935	Washington	Murder	John W. New, 21, white	Eugene Talmadge
Robert Mullinax	White	34	M	June 14, 1935	Floyd	Murder	Navin P. Hancock, 23, white (stepson)	Eugene Talmadge
Charlie Beasley	Black	50	M	June 14, 1935	Troup	Murder	Dan Daniel, 64, white	Eugene Talmadge
Cleveland Hicks	Black	30	M	July 12, 1935	Mitchell	Murder-Robbery	Charles Edward Norris, 31, white	Eugene Talmadge
J. B. Reese	Black	19	M	July 19, 1935	Jackson	Rape	Female, white	Eugene Talmadge
Simmie Gaines	Black	35	M	October 10, 1935	Oglethorpe	Murder-Robbery	Ida E. Goolsby, 73, white (Note: Also murdered her daughter, Mettie Goolsby (49).)	Eugene Talmadge
George McRae	White	24	M	October 18, 1935	Cherokee	Murder-Robbery	Virgil Turner, 21, white	Eugene Talmadge
Jack Mattox	Black	26	M	November 22, 1935	Oglethorpe	Murder	Ed Watkins, 40, black	Eugene Talmadge
John Will White	Black	24	M	December 20, 1935	Cobb	Murder-Robbery	Orel C. Swanson, 32, white (Note: Also murdered W. P. Smith (54, white).)	Eugene Talmadge
Marvin Honea	White	29	M	December 20, 1935	Fulton	Murder-Robbery	David Lord, 23, white	Eugene Talmadge
Eddie B. Bowen	Black	18	M	March 6, 1936	Douglas	Murder-Burglary	Joseph Carroll, 42, white	Eugene Talmadge
Thomas Nelson	Black	38	M	March 20, 1936	Camden	Murder-Robbery	Nicholas K. Perry, 23, white	Eugene Talmadge
John Henry Simmons	Black	50	M	March 20, 1936	Camden	Murder-Robbery	Nicholas K. Perry, 23, white	Eugene Talmadge
Julius Lowman	Black	32	M	March 25, 1936	Chatham	Murder	Helen Lowman, 32, black (common-law wife)	Eugene Talmadge
Hamp McLemore	Black	21	M	April 10, 1936	Muscogee	Rape	Ola Melton, 25, white	Eugene Talmadge
John Henry Thomas	Black	21	M	August 6, 1936	Clarke	Murder-Robbery	Charles Lewis Rice, 48, white	Eugene Talmadge
Demp Charles	Black	28	M	August 21, 1936	Hall	Murder-Robbery	Walter Simpson, 67, white	Eugene Talmadge
John Daniel	Black	24	M	August 21, 1936	Hall	Murder-Robbery	Walter Simpson, 67, white	Eugene Talmadge
Arthur Coombs	Black	30	M	November 12, 1936	Henry	Rape	Female, white	Eugene Talmadge
Winton Boyer	Black	24	M	December 4, 1936	Hancock	Murder	Maurice L. Stafford, 25, white (Sparta motorcycle police officer)	Eugene Talmadge
John Sloan	Black	25	M	December 31, 1936	Colquitt	Murder	Otis Gay, 22, white	Eugene Talmadge
Arthur Burden	Black	28	M	February 24, 1937	Bibb	Murder	Elizabeth Jones Henry, 28, black (sister-in-law)	Eurith D. Rivers
James Burke	Black	24	M	April 19, 1937	Richmond	Murder-Robbery	Patrick Joseph Collins, 67, white	Eurith D. Rivers
J. P. Goodman	Black	21	M	May 14, 1937	DeKalb	Murder	Willie Thomas, 20, black	Eurith D. Rivers
Eli Melton	White	29	M	May 21, 1937	Muscogee	Rape-Robbery	Female, 18, white	Eurith D. Rivers
Will Lacy	Black	41	M	May 21, 1937	Cook	Murder	Donie Lockhart Mitchell and Nellie Ruth Harris, 49 and 26, black	Eurith D. Rivers
Leonard Brown	Black	18	M	May 24, 1937	Richmond	Murder	Walter F. Barnard, 46, white	Eurith D. Rivers
Mose Trammell	Black	36	M	May 28, 1937	Troup	Murder	Willie Mae Palmore Trammell, 24, black (wife)	Eurith D. Rivers
Willie Hopkins	Black		M	June 14, 1937	Burke	Rape	Female, 33, white	Eurith D. Rivers
James Worthy	Black	24	M	June 18, 1937	Fulton	Murder-Robbery	Barry C. Dodson, 49, white	Eurith D. Rivers
Edgar Rose	White	27	M	June 18, 1937	Dougherty	Murder	Thomas Levy Lewis, 50, white (prison guard)	Eurith D. Rivers
Charlie Young	Black	35	M	June 25, 1937	Burke	Murder	Estella Smith Young, 32, black (wife)	Eurith D. Rivers
Mitchell Jackson	Black	26	M	July 9, 1937	Fulton	Murder	Birdie Adele Doughty Fluker, 57, white	Eurith D. Rivers
Willie E. Douberly	White	25	M	July 30, 1937	Chatham	Murder-Robbery	Peter Carellas, 55, white	Eurith D. Rivers
Lawrence Ward	White	52	M	August 13, 1937	Jeff Davis	Murder	Maude Salters, 14, white (stepdaughter)	Eurith D. Rivers
Clinton Pinson	Black	40	M	September 29, 1937	Fulton	Murder	Roscoe Harbin, 26, white	Eurith D. Rivers
Willie Frank Daniels	Black	25	M	December 27, 1937 (Note: Last electrocution at Milledgeville.)	Clarke	Murder	Herman Stein, 43, white (Athens police officer)	Eurith D. Rivers
Archie Haywood	Black	37	M	May 6, 1938 (Note: First electrocution at Reidsville.)	Worth	Murder-Robbery	Will Robinson, black	Eurith D. Rivers
George Thomas	Black	21	M	May 13, 1938	Fulton	Murder-Robbery	C. Gordon Haston, 30, white	Eurith D. Rivers
Levy L. Rozier	White	38	M	June 17, 1938	Ware	Rape	Female, 7, white (Note: Serial rapist, also convicted and sentenced to 20 years for the rape of an 8-year-old black girl, was under indictment for raping a 9-year-old black girl on the same day as the crime he was executed for, and had previously attacked another young white girl.)	Eurith D. Rivers
Walter Melton	Black	31	M	October 28, 1938	Charlton	Murder	Pratt G. Mizell, 58, white	Eurith D. Rivers
Ralph Benton	Black	40	M	October 28, 1938	Fulton	Murder	John Jinks, 29, black	Eurith D. Rivers
Isaac McBride	Black	31	M	November 4, 1938	Clinch	Murder	Carey A. Thomas, 32, white (deputy sheriff)	Eurith D. Rivers
Buck Etheridge	Black	20	M	November 10, 1938	Henry	Murder	Will Combs, 68, black	Eurith D. Rivers
Frank Knight	Black	26	M	November 25, 1938	Bryan	Rape	Female, 14, white	Eurith D. Rivers
George Gilbert	Black	28	M	November 30, 1938	Troup	Rape	Female, white	Eurith D. Rivers
Arthur Mack	Black	26	M	December 9, 1938	Muscogee	Murder-Robbery	Charles R. Helton, 47, white (deputy police officer)	Eurith D. Rivers
Arthur Perry	Black	25	M	December 9, 1938	Muscogee	Murder-Robbery	Charles R. Helton, 47, white (deputy police officer)	Eurith D. Rivers
John Henry Williams	Black	21	M	December 9, 1938	Butts	Murder	Charles T. Thornton, 55, white (Note: Raymond Carter also took part in the murder of Thomas H. Herd (see 1943).)	Eurith D. Rivers
Raymond Carter	Black	24	M	December 9, 1938	Butts	Murder	Charles T. Thornton, 55, white	Eurith D. Rivers
Charlie Rucker	Black	18	M	December 9, 1938	Butts	Murder	Charles T. Thornton, 55, white	Eurith D. Rivers
Willie D. Russell	Black	31	M	December 9, 1938	Cobb	Murder	George Washington Camp and Christine Camp Pauls, 66 and 26, white	Eurith D. Rivers
Wilson Wright	Black	18	M	January 25, 1939	Chatham	Murder-Robbery	Morris Center, 66, white	Eurith D. Rivers
Harvey Floyd Nelson	White	36	M	June 23, 1939	Ware	Murder	J. C. Nelson, 12, white (son) (Note: Also previously murdered his 32-year-old wife Ethel in Coffee County.)	Eurith D. Rivers
J. D. Vaughan	Black	25	M	July 7, 1939	Walton	Rape	Female, white (Note: Also raped a black woman later that same day.)	Eurith D. Rivers
Arthur E. Barker	White	35	M	July 26, 1939	Gwinnett	Murder	Millie Barker, 33, white (wife)	Eurith D. Rivers
Marion Hunter	Black	25	M	August 4, 1939	Chatham	Murder-Robbery	Five people, white (Note: James Sidney Tillman (34), his wife Mary Eliza Tillman (29), their daughters Clara Pearl (8) and Leola Tillman (6), and Thomas Chester (42, unrelated).)	Eurith D. Rivers
Clarence Sheffield	Black	36	M	September 29, 1939	Ware	Murder	Bennie Ralls, 31, black	Eurith D. Rivers
Sheppard Bruno	Black	45	M	November 17, 1939	Dougherty	Murder-Robbery	Willie Dorsey Aultman, 33, white (Note: Walter E. Moree (33, white) was killed as well but Bruno was not executed on this charge.)	Eurith D. Rivers
James Bivins	Black	19	M	November 21, 1939	Schley	Murder	Mollie Frazier and Coley Richardson, 50 and 35, black	Eurith D. Rivers
Joe Mathis	Black	27	M	February 9, 1940	Newton	Murder	John E. and Emma Trainer, 73 and 72, white	Eurith D. Rivers
James Fisher	Black	27	M	February 9, 1940	Newton	Murder	John E. and Emma Trainer, 73 and 72, white	Eurith D. Rivers
William L. Mims	Black	38	M	March 22, 1940	Bibb	Murder	Dave F. Mitchell, 57, white	Eurith D. Rivers
Robert Brown	Black	26	M	May 17, 1940	Jefferson	Murder	Keelon Eugene Thompson, 37, white	Eurith D. Rivers
Oscar Fields	Black	24	M	August 16, 1940	Fulton	Rape	Mary Frances Thomas, 20, white (Note: Serial rapists, previously attacked Laverne Long (17, white) and Eva Krimes (16, white).)	Eurith D. Rivers
Curtis Barkley	Black	34	M	August 16, 1940	Fulton	Rape	Mary Frances Thomas, 20, white	Eurith D. Rivers
Eddie Brown	Black	30	M	August 23, 1940	Lowndes	Robbery (Note: Also shot and wounded the victim.)	Elias Rykard, 20, white	Eurith D. Rivers
Charlie Josey	Black	20	M	August 23, 1940	Pike	Murder	Ollie Joe Cannafax Jr., 32, white	Eurith D. Rivers
Fred Anderson	Black	19	M	October 4, 1940	Laurens	Murder	A. J. Page, 20, white	Eurith D. Rivers
Henry William Hicks	Black	18	M	October 18, 1940	Thomas	Rape	Female, 16, white	Eurith D. Rivers
John William Sutton	Black	22	M	November 8, 1940	Whitfield	Murder-Robbery	Arthur L. Edwards, 67, white	Eurith D. Rivers
Robert Lee Brannon	Black	39	M	December 13, 1940	Floyd	Murder	Bessie Brannon, 32, black (wife)	Eurith D. Rivers
Buddie Lawrence	Black	28	M	December 13, 1940	Bacon	Murder-Robbery	Alexander Steve Johnson, 56, white	Eurith D. Rivers
Jennings Waddell	Black	34	M	December 27, 1940	Toombs	Murder	Otis White, 3, black (Note: Also murdered Fannie (65), Lillie (30), and Annie White (12) during the same crime.)	Eurith D. Rivers
Eddie Hayes	Black	20	M	January 3, 1941	Coweta	Murder-Robbery	Will Canaday, 35, black	Eurith D. Rivers
Johnnie Watson	Black	33	M	January 3, 1941	Coweta	Murder-Robbery	Will Canaday, 35, black	Eurith D. Rivers
William Henry Bland	Black	23	M	May 12, 1941	Henry	Rape	No information	Eugene Talmadge
Willie Jenkins	Black	23	M	May 23, 1941	Fulton	Murder-Robbery	Thomas Watson Adcock, 44, white	Eugene Talmadge
Charlie Anderson	Black	18	M	May 23, 1941	Fulton	Murder-Robbery	Thomas Watson Adcock, 44, white	Eugene Talmadge
Albert Alford	Black	32	M	October 10, 1941	Hart	Rape	Female, 72, white (Note: Attempted to rape another white woman in Hart County six days later, was serving as a chain gang trusty at time of crimes.)	Eugene Talmadge
James Shivers	Black	38	M	January 30, 1942	Fayette	Rape	No information	Eugene Talmadge
Charlie Strickland	Black	25	M	January 31, 1942	Terrell	Murder	Essie Mae Smith, 21, black (ex-girlfriend)	Eugene Talmadge
Edward Leroy Martin	Black	28	M	February 6, 1942	Jefferson	Murder	Louis D. Hubbard, 24, white (deputy sheriff)	Eugene Talmadge
John Miller	Black	35	M	March 6, 1942	DeKalb	Rape	Female, white	Eugene Talmadge
Howard O. Cone	White	24	M	March 11, 1942	Thomas	Murder	Roy Marion Tucker, 28, white	Eugene Talmadge
Norman Williams	White	28	M	May 15, 1942	Elbert	Murder	Lon Nathan Fortson, 58, white	Eugene Talmadge
Dock Moore	Black	25	M	July 2, 1942	Fulton	Murder	Glenn A. Baxley, 35, white	Eugene Talmadge
S. T. Mosley	Black	23	M	July 10, 1942	Taylor	Murder	Minnie Pearl Hooten Mosley, 22, black (wife)	Eugene Talmadge
Buster Shaw	Black	20	M	October 16, 1942	Brantley	Murder-Rape	Four victims, white (Note: George Riley Strickland (65), his wife Amanda (39), and their sons Riley (13) and Harvey (8). Mrs. Strickland was raped before being killed.)	Eugene Talmadge
Charles E. Martin Jr.	White	24	M	October 16, 1942	DeKalb	Murder	Dorothy Bryant Martin, 24, white (estranged wife)	Eugene Talmadge
W. Z. Lewis	Black	26	M	November 26, 1942	Thomas	Murder-Robbery	George McMath, 43, black	Eugene Talmadge
Raymond Dowdell	Black	31	M	January 15, 1943	Muscogee	Murder	Mattie Pearl Thornton, 21, black	Ellis Arnall
Richard Smith	Black	24	M	February 4, 1943	Fulton	Murder-Burglary	Thomas H. Herd, 67, white (Note: Also took part in the murder of Charles T. Thornton (see 1938).)	Ellis Arnall
Charles Coates	White	29	M	March 12, 1943	Catoosa	Murder	William Fred Black Jr., 29, white (highway patrolman)	Ellis Arnall
Lewis Wilcoxon	Black	20	M	March 26, 1943	Cobb	Rape-Burglary	Female, white	Ellis Arnall
Bernice Franklin	Black	17	M	May 28, 1943	Wayne	Murder-Rape	Gladys O'Quinn Cameron, 33, white (Note: Previously convicted of the attempted rape of a white woman.)	Ellis Arnall
Joel Luther Palmer	White	30	M	May 28, 1943	Tift	Murder	Joe Henderson, 55, white (Tifton police chief) (Note: police officer Mercer Denby (25, white) was also wounded and died two months later. Palmer was sentenced only for Henderson's death.)	Ellis Arnall
Mose Sims	Black	23	M	June 10, 1943	Fulton	Rape	Delores C. Kuehnle, 45, white	Ellis Arnall
Edmond Reed	Black	26	M	July 19, 1943	Bibb	Murder	John Grady Favors, 41, white (Macon police officer)	Ellis Arnall
Adel Johnson	Black	21	M	August 10, 1943	Fulton	Rape	Two females, 19 (second victim), white and black	Ellis Arnall
Marlin Hancock	White	43	M	August 20, 1943	Paulding	Murder	Hoke Mosley, 38, white	Ellis Arnall
Charlie Sexton	Black	16	M	August 20, 1943	Paulding	Murder-Robbery	Ernest J. Clonts, 16, black	Ellis Arnall
John Thomas Russell	Black	27	M	August 20, 1943	Fulton	Murder-Robbery	George H. A. Thomas, 57, white	Ellis Arnall
Eugene Pittman	Black	28	M	August 20, 1943	Polk	Murder	Myrtis Goggins, 38, black (Note: Also murdered his wife, 21-year-old Ruby Pittman, who was in an affair with Goggins.)	Ellis Arnall
Serina Hodo	Black	23	M	September 24, 1943	Meriwether	Murder-Robbery	Thomas N. Mosley, 58, white	Ellis Arnall
Tommie Lee Mathis	Black	23	M	October 22, 1943	Spalding	Murder	Albert Nash, 25, black	Ellis Arnall
Robert Williams	Black	20	M	October 23, 1943	Laurens	Murder	Zennie Lee Holland Williams, 18, black (wife)	Ellis Arnall
S. A. Ellison	Black	17	M	December 11, 1943	Meriwether	Murder-Robbery	Thomas N. Mosley, 58, white	Ellis Arnall
H. T. Johnson	Black	22	M	December 31, 1943	Henry	Murder	Grady W. Solomon, 20, black	Ellis Arnall
Willie Hubbard	Black	28	M	January 5, 1944	Bibb	Rape-Robbery	Pansy Deese, 64, white	Ellis Arnall
Isaac Irwin	White	32	M	January 7, 1944	Bibb	Murder-Robbery	John N. and Lieu Williams Perdue, 57 and 60, white	Ellis Arnall
Willie Hicks	Black	18	M	February 3, 1944	Fulton	Rape	Edna Strickland, 20, white	Ellis Arnall
Marvin Lewis Lee	Black	22	M	March 7, 1944	Fulton	Rape-Burglary	Frances Gwin, 14, white (Note: Also committed another attack 3 weeks earlier.)	Ellis Arnall
Rock Hooten	Black	24	M	March 17, 1944	Taylor	Murder-Robbery	Vann Jackson, 67, black	Ellis Arnall
Herbert Rozier	Black	72	M	April 7, 1944	Laurens	Murder	Wesley G. Davis, 45, white	Ellis Arnall
Oscar Reed	Black	26	M	April 28, 1944	Bibb (Note: Apparent change of venue; originally charged in Dodge and Jones Counties respectively.)	Rape	Lucille Brady Evans, 30, white	Ellis Arnall
Robert Walker	Black	26	M	April 28, 1944	Bibb	Rape-Burglary	Maud Hudson, 54, white	Ellis Arnall
Grady Ellison	Black	36	M	May 25, 1944	Burke	Murder	Nettie Mobley, 31, black (common-law wife)	Ellis Arnall
William B. Stroup	White	41	M	July 28, 1944	Fulton	Rape-Kidnap	Female, 12, white	Ellis Arnall
Jimmie Lee Tye	Black	22	M	January 19, 1945	Fulton	Murder	Lonnie Johnson, 26, black	Ellis Arnall
Henry Glass	Black	21	M	January 19, 1945	Fulton	Murder	Lonnie Johnson, 26, black	Ellis Arnall
Walter Fowler	White	22	M	March 2, 1945	Forsyth	Murder-Robbery	Benjamin Perry Roper, 74, white	Ellis Arnall
Willie Jackson	Black	25	M	March 2, 1945	Fulton	Rape	Myrtle F. Gantt, 60, white	Ellis Arnall
Lena Baker	Black	44	F	March 5, 1945	Randolph	Murder (Note: Baker was granted a posthumous pardon by the Georgia State Board of Pardons and Paroles in 2005. The board did not find Baker to be innocent, but said that she could've been tried for voluntary manslaughter instead of murder.)	Ernest B. Knight, 67, white	Ellis Arnall
Edmond V. Smith	White	39	M	March 9, 1945	Pike	Murder	Eloise Smith, 37, white (wife)	Ellis Arnall
L. C. Johnson	Black	19	M	March 9, 1945	Newton	Murder-Rape	Ezma Piper Berry, 63, white	Ellis Arnall
Ulysses Gilbert	Black	24	M	April 27, 1945	Houston	Murder	Robert Horton, 25, black	Ellis Arnall
David Watkins	Black	18	M	May 11, 1945	Bibb	Murder-Robbery	Ella Connell, 70, white	Ellis Arnall
Nathaniel Lamar	Black	21	M	May 11, 1945	Bibb	Murder-Robbery	Ella Connell, 70, white	Ellis Arnall
Edward Lee Green	Black	23	M	June 1, 1945	Houston	Rape	Ella Mae Joyner, white	Ellis Arnall
Jack Roy Green	Black	40	M	June 29, 1945	Sumter	Rape-Burglary	Rena Duckworth, 65, white	Ellis Arnall
Albert Smithwick	White	26	M	July 28, 1945	Chatham	Murder	Julian Eli DeLoach, 37, white	Ellis Arnall
Henry Hayes	Black	27	M	August 24, 1945	Fulton	Robbery (Note: Also beat the victim unconscious and attempted to rape her.)	Lucy E. Wright, 35, white	Ellis Arnall
Robert R. Gunnells	White	40	M	August 24, 1945	Baldwin	Murder	Bertha Logan Gunnells, 23, white (wife) (Note: Also murdered his previous wife, Runnette Simmerson, but this charge resulted in a mistrial and he was released on bond.)	Ellis Arnall
Charlie Johnson	Black	27	M	September 21, 1945	Early	Rape	Female, 14, white	Ellis Arnall
Jesse Craiton	Black	23	M	November 9, 1945	Fulton	Murder-Robbery	Peter D. Vergiotis, 59, white	Ellis Arnall
Noah Collins	Black	29	M	November 9, 1945	Chatham	Murder-Robbery	Joe McKinney, 51, black	Ellis Arnall
Nathaniel Taylor	Black	37	M	November 30, 1945	Laurens	Murder	Lutressa Brown, 43, black (girlfriend) (Note: Serving a life term for the murder of Rufus McKibben (29, black) in Fulton County at time of crime, was a trusty at the county public works camp.)	Ellis Arnall
Eddie Daniels	Black	34	M	February 8, 1946	Grady	Murder	Juanita King, 35, black	Ellis Arnall
Leon Lewis	Black	26	M	March 29, 1946	Fulton	Rape	Frances Norman, 27, white	Ellis Arnall
Isaac Bonner	Black	19	M	March 29, 1946	Bibb	Murder-Robbery	Enrico DiVenuto, 53, white	Ellis Arnall
Willie Jones	Black	28	M	April 19, 1946	Ware	Murder-Rape-Burglary	Winnie Wilcox Kirkland, 72, white	Ellis Arnall
Early Bryant	Black	30	M	May 31, 1946	Fulton	Rape	Female, 60, white	Ellis Arnall
Anderson Burke	Black	28	M	July 5, 1946	Oglethorpe	Rape	Mavis Smith, 17, white	Ellis Arnall
Aaron Napper	Black	41	M	July 19, 1946	Laurens	Murder	John J. Webb, 74, white (Dudley police officer)	Ellis Arnall
Jesse R. McKethan	White	22	M	August 2, 1946	Chatham	Murder	George Luther Aids, 17, white	Ellis Arnall
Walter H. Yearwood	White	23	M	October 22, 1946	Clarke	Murder-Robbery	Harry W. Williamson, 40, white	Ellis Arnall
Alton Murray	White	29	M	November 8, 1946	Candler	Murder	Tom Watson Brantley, 50, white (sheriff) (Note: Also murdered 42-year-old police officer Willie B. Jones.)	Ellis Arnall
Lee James Allen	Black	16	M	November 15, 1946	Fulton	Rape	Female, 41, white (Note: Serial rapist, committed 10 other rapes and an attempted rape against two other white women. Also murdered a female (19, white). Part of a three-man gang alongside James Mangum (see 1948).)	Ellis Arnall
Willie Stevenson	Black	17	M	November 22, 1946	Lee	Murder-Robbery	Lucius Thomas, 47, black	Ellis Arnall
Johnnie Burns	Black	22	M	November 22, 1946	Lee	Murder-Robbery	Lucius Thomas, 47, black	Ellis Arnall
James Rufus Williams	Black	22	M	November 29, 1946	Irwin	Murder	Wilburn Tucker and Joseph Bartow Morgan, 57 and 60, white (guards)	Ellis Arnall
Albert Parker	Black	29	M	December 13, 1946	Cook	Murder-Robbery	Marcus Lee, 71, white	Ellis Arnall
J. C. Hill	Black	19	M	December 20, 1946	Ware	Murder-Rape-Burglary	Winnie Wilcox Kirkland, 72, white	Ellis Arnall
Morris Dorsey	Black	23	M	February 8, 1947	Chatham	Murder	Abraham Aaron and Mary Blidge Barnwell, 71 and 78, black	Herman Talmadge
Arthur Brown Jr.	Black	23	M	February 8, 1947	Chatham	Murder	Abraham Aaron and Mary Blidge Barnwell, 71 and 78, black	Herman Talmadge
Homer R. Knapp	White	38	M	April 18, 1947	Chatham	Murder	Inez M. Lanier, 38, white	Melvin E. Thompson
Willis Barnes	White	29	M	April 25, 1947	Emanuel	Murder	James Henry Clark, 49, white (Note: Also murdered Joseph Brown Peacock (38, white) and critically wounded Garbert W. Mayes (39, white), who later died in 1954 possibly as a result these injuries.)	Melvin E. Thompson
Lauren Porter	Black	38	M	April 25, 1947	Oglethorpe	Murder-Robbery	William Roderic Cofer, 68, white (Note: Serial killer, discovered to be the previous perpetrator of a series of four murders known as the "Goose Pond Murders" between 1939 and 1944.)	Melvin E. Thompson
Quiller Daniel	Black	30	M	May 2, 1947	Franklin	Murder	Marilyn Webb and Willie A. Carnes, 35 and 43, white	Melvin E. Thompson
James Brown	Black	24	M	June 17, 1947	Screven	Rape-Kidnap	Female, 26, white (Note: Raped another white woman later that day.)	Melvin E. Thompson
Herbert L. Reddick	Black	17	M	June 30, 1947	Bibb (Note: Change of venue from Telfair County.)	Murder-Robbery-Kidnap	Otis D. Grooms, 54, white	Melvin E. Thompson
Robert L. Stanford	Black	25	M	August 1, 1947	Richmond	Murder-Robbery	Harry Woo, 41, Asian	Melvin E. Thompson
Ebenezer Scott	Black	27	M	August 1, 1947	Chatham	Murder	Fannie Milton, 18, black (girlfriend)	Melvin E. Thompson
Terrell Loughbridge	White	29	M	August 9, 1947	Jefferson	Murder-Robbery	Calvin C. Rowland, 23, white	Melvin E. Thompson
Roosevelt Moore	Black	26	M	August 13, 1947	Stewart	Murder	Archie B. Brinson, 49, black (father-in-law)	Melvin E. Thompson
Jim Owen	Black	43	M	October 6, 1947	Warren	Murder	Tommie Rogers, 27, black	Melvin E. Thompson
Sweetie Bryant Jr.	Black	29	M	October 10, 1947	Mitchell	Murder	Will Davis, 47, black (father-in-law)	Melvin E. Thompson
Oscar L. Ford	Black	21	M	October 10, 1947	Dougherty	Murder-Robbery	Samuel A. Bailey, 57, white	Melvin E. Thompson
Nick Morakis	White	53	M	November 18, 1947	Morgan	Murder	Frederick H. Adams, 56, white (police chief)	Melvin E. Thompson
Joe Porter	Black	27	M	January 2, 1948	Sumter	Murder-Robbery	Perry R. Cannon, 64, white	Melvin E. Thompson
Leroy Scrutchens	Black	37	M	January 2, 1948	Sumter	Murder-Robbery	Perry R. Cannon, 64, white	Melvin E. Thompson
Eddie Brown Jr.	Black	23	M	February 13, 1948	Carroll	Murder	David Andrew Boyd, 28, white	Melvin E. Thompson
J. W. Torbert	Black	37	M	February 16, 1948	Randolph	Murder	Henry Peavy, 72, white	Melvin E. Thompson
James Mangum	Black	18	M	March 5, 1948	Fulton	Rape	Addie Reeves, 70, white (Note: The rape was part of larger crime spree in which Mangum had committed multiple rapes and robberies and murdered a female (19, white). Part of a three-man gang alongside Lee James Allen (see 1946).)	Melvin E. Thompson
L. P. Campbell	Black	26	M	March 26, 1948	Floyd	Murder-Robbery	Joseph T. Chandler, 68, white	Melvin E. Thompson
Red Lamar Nunn	Black	43	M	August 13, 1948	Jefferson	Murder	Plummer Nunn, 35, black (wife)	Melvin E. Thompson
Sam Whitt	Black	22	M	August 16, 1948	Fulton	Murder	Margrette Whitt, 21, black (wife)	Melvin E. Thompson
J. B. Beetles	Black	32	M	October 15, 1948	Carroll	Murder-Robbery	Charles B. Wike, 75, white	Melvin E. Thompson
William C. Davis	Black	55	M	October 15, 1948	Carroll	Murder-Robbery	Charles B. Wike, 75, white	Melvin E. Thompson
Charlie Garrett	White	26	M	November 5, 1948	Towns	Murder-Robbery	Milton Melvin Maney, 75, white	Melvin E. Thompson
Jewell Eller	White	21	M	November 5, 1948	Towns	Murder-Robbery	Milton Melvin Maney, 75, white	Melvin E. Thompson
L. C. Brown	Black	25	M	November 26, 1948	Greene	Murder	William T. Jarrell, 29, white (road crew warden)	Herman Talmadge
Jessie C. Carroll	White	44	M	April 8, 1949	Muscogee	Murder	Daisy Carroll, 36, white (wife)	Herman Talmadge
Junior Moore	Black	25	M	April 20, 1949	Bibb	Murder	Walter L. O'Cain, 61, white (Macon city detective)	Herman Talmadge
Morgan Persons	Black	39	M	May 20, 1949	Worth	Murder	Eula Lee Grant, 15, black (step-daughter)	Herman Talmadge
A. C. Williams	Black	33	M	June 1, 1949	Fulton	Murder	Jeriah Steed, 23, black	Herman Talmadge
Andrew Dorsey	Black	23	M	August 19, 1949	Fulton	Rape	Bertie Mae Kelley and Sara Crumley, 23 and 13, black	Herman Talmadge
Wilbur G. Jones	Black	18	M	September 12, 1949	Sumter	Murder-Robbery	Barney F. DeVane, 21, white	Herman Talmadge
John A. Jones Jr.	Black	17	M	September 12, 1949	Sumter	Murder-Robbery	Barney F. DeVane, 21, white	Herman Talmadge
Lindsey Brown	Black	26	M	December 16, 1949	Burke	Murder	Annie Bell Jackson Irvin, 30, black	Herman Talmadge
Eddie Houser Jr.	Black	22	M	January 27, 1950	Peach	Robbery	Helen Marshall, 52, white	Herman Talmadge
Jesse Wyatt	Black	39	M	April 21, 1950	DeKalb	Murder	Jesse C. Haynes, 67, white (guard)	Herman Talmadge
John P. Carrington	White	29	M	April 28, 1950	Fulton	Murder	Beatrice Samples, 26, white (girlfriend)	Herman Talmadge
Robert F. Bryan	Black	19	M	May 26, 1950	Chatham	Murder-Robbery	Nicholas A. Pahno, 71, white	Herman Talmadge
Curtis Wynn Jr.	Black	20	M	August 18, 1950	Richmond	Murder-Robbery	M. K. Joe, 50, Asian	Herman Talmadge
Lincoln Mays	Black	24	M	August 18, 1950	Richmond	Murder-Robbery	M. K. Joe, 50, Asian	Herman Talmadge
Charlie L. Cade	Black	20	M	August 18, 1950	Richmond	Murder-Robbery	M. K. Joe, 50, Asian	Herman Talmadge
George McKay	Black	30	M	September 29, 1950	Fulton	Murder	Peter G. Vergiotis, 59, white	Herman Talmadge
Jimmie Lee Gardner	Black	27	M	October 28, 1950	Clay	Robbery (Note: Also tortured victim for 30 minutes and then attempted to murder her by slashing her throat.)	Winnie Mae Mills, 58, white	Herman Talmadge
Jimmie Richardson	Black	47	M	November 3, 1950	Crisp	Murder	Grace Burston, 42, black (estranged girlfriend)	Herman Talmadge
John Wallace	White	54	M	November 3, 1950	Coweta	Murder	William H. Turner, 23, white	Herman Talmadge
George Kersey	White	27	M	November 21, 1950	Chatham	Murder-Robbery	Edward Ernest Crosby, 37, white	Herman Talmadge
Thomas Lynch	White	31	M	November 21, 1950	Chatham	Murder-Robbery	Edward Ernest Crosby, 37, white	Herman Talmadge
Willie B. Harris	Black	47	M	March 2, 1951	Worth	Murder	Tiny Glenn, 25, black	Herman Talmadge
Jimmie C. Williams	Black	28	M	May 25, 1951	Clinch	Rape	Female, 19, white	Herman Talmadge
George W. Solesbee	White	26	M	July 27, 1951	Clinch	Murder-Robbery	Buel L. Webster, 52, white (Note: Also murdered hitchhiker Sam Mason (45, black) under similar circumstances near Aiken, South Carolina four days earlier.)	Herman Talmadge
E. B. McLendon Jr.	White	37	M	October 5, 1951	Richmond	Murder	Dorothy Jones McLendon, 34, white (wife)	Herman Talmadge
Willie Ford Ballard	Black	22	M	November 2, 1951	Gwinnett	Rape	Ruth Addington, 27, white (Note: Previously convicted of the attempted rape of a black woman in Bibb County and serving a 10-year sentence for the crime at time of offense.)	Herman Talmadge
Jim Parks	Black	45	M	December 14, 1951	Pike	Murder	Dana Mae Green, 37, black	Herman Talmadge
Vester McBurnett	White	43	M	December 17, 1951	Floyd	Murder	George Horace Williamson, 40, white	Herman Talmadge
Henry Brock	White	39	M	February 21, 1952	Floyd	Murder	Mary L. Brock, 30, white (estranged wife)	Herman Talmadge
Homer Almond	Black	48	M	March 1, 1952	DeKalb	Murder-Rape	Winifred Garnett Gabriel, 55, white	Herman Talmadge
Clifton Williams	Black	30	M	March 14, 1952	Richmond	Murder	Dorothy Mae Williams, 26, black (wife)	Herman Talmadge
Pat Reece	White	33	M	April 4, 1952	White	Murder	Monroe Wilson Fields, 38, white	Herman Talmadge
Eli Griffin	Black	42	M	April 17, 1952	Putnam	Murder	William D. Elder, 38, white	Herman Talmadge
Arthur Darden	Black	22	M	April 25, 1952	Grady	Murder	Eugene Butler, 26, black	Herman Talmadge
Napoleon Wise	Black	20	M	June 6, 1952	Emanuel	Murder	Alonzo Thomas Horton Jr., 47, white	Herman Talmadge
John Henry Thornton	Black	24	M	July 11, 1952	Fulton	Murder	Evalena Teamer, 25, black	Herman Talmadge
James Blackston Jr.	Black	30	M	July 25, 1952	Coffee	Murder	Lucille Blackston, 20, black (wife)	Herman Talmadge
Horace Johnson	Black	29	M	October 7, 1952	Jones	Murder	Leila Inez Mims, 40, white	Herman Talmadge
Henry Savage	Black	35	M	November 21, 1952	Chatham	Murder	Laysie Millan, 26, black (brother-in-law)	Herman Talmadge
Abraham Pinkney	Black	67	M	February 27, 1953	Berrien	Murder	Walter Reppard Henderson, 57, white (Note: Also murdered his common-law wife Mary Clements and step-daughter Rosa Lee Spikes (52 and 32, black) during the same crime.)	Herman Talmadge
Jesse Starr	Black	26	M	April 16, 1953	Floyd	Rape-Robbery	Barbara Ann Jones, 18, white	Herman Talmadge
Amos Patrick	Black	34	M	May 8, 1953	Clarke	Murder	Dora Mae Dupree Lewis, 26, black (girlfriend)	Herman Talmadge
Robert Strickland	White	20	M	August 24, 1953	Chatham	Murder-Robbery	James Lawton Lewis, 21, white	Herman Talmadge
Samuel Bowens	Black	23	M	August 28, 1953	Screven	Murder	Janie Lee Dunbar, 22, black (wife)	Herman Talmadge
Willie Burgess	Black	56	M	November 14, 1953	Chatham	Murder	Louise Bush, 27, black	Herman Talmadge
Robert E. Calhoun	Black	31	M	December 18, 1953	Coweta	Murder	James McGinty, 32, black (Note: Previously convicted of murder in Carroll County and sentenced to a chain gang but paroled.)	Herman Talmadge
Isiah Harris	Black	33	M	December 23, 1953	Ware	Rape	Female, white	Herman Talmadge
Paul Wright	Black	19	M	January 22, 1954	Walton	Murder-Burglary	Sarah Belle Daniel, 43, white	Herman Talmadge
Doyal Scott	White	30	M	February 5, 1954	Glynn	Murder	Ruby May Daniels, 29, white (girlfriend)	Herman Talmadge
Lindsey Heard	Black	20	M	May 25, 1954	Cherokee	Rape	Laura Hancock, white	Herman Talmadge
Ozzie Jones	Black	32	M	June 11, 1954	Chatham	Rape-Robbery	Female, 20, white	Herman Talmadge
Willie Jackson	Black	17	M	June 15, 1954	Baldwin	Rape	Female, 18, white	Herman Talmadge
Herman Lee Miller	Black	18	M	June 15, 1954	Baldwin	Rape	Female, 18, white	Herman Talmadge
Sylvester Seymour	Black	35	M	August 6, 1954	Richmond	Murder-Robbery	Thomas G. Broome, 61, white	Herman Talmadge
Howard L. Booker	Black	35	M	September 17, 1954	Fulton	Robbery	Sarah Babbitt, 28, white (Note: Also "pawed" Babbitt "in a sexual manner" and slashed her breasts, and was later sentenced to 20 years for an unrelated rape in Clayton County.)	Herman Talmadge
Elliott Simon	Black	55	M	November 5, 1954	Colquitt	Murder	Mallie Coates, 32, black	Herman Talmadge
Calvin E. Davis	Black	19	M	November 12, 1954	Schley	Murder-Robbery	Nora Jones, 70, black	Herman Talmadge
Charles L. King	Black	19	M	November 19, 1954	Upson	Murder-Robbery	Daniel Edgar Henderson, 65, white	Herman Talmadge
Joe Lee Jones	Black	17	M	November 19, 1954	Upson	Murder-Robbery	Daniel Edgar Henderson, 65, white	Herman Talmadge
James W. Morgan	White	18	M	January 7, 1955	Richmond	Murder-Robbery	Eugene Talmadge Bryant, 20, white	Herman Talmadge
Tom Williams	Black	53	M	April 15, 1955	Colquitt	Murder	Walter C. and Gladys H. Rowland, 68 and 48, white (Note: Also suspected in another double murder the day prior, when Edward T. Norman and Jefferson Davis Croft (41 and 42, white) were murdered in an all-night diner.)	Marvin Griffin
Howard Jackson	Black	44	M	April 15, 1955	Coweta	Murder	Carrie Willie Jackson, 32, black (estranged wife)	Marvin Griffin
Sylvester Fuller	Black	25	M	June 17, 1955	Calhoun	Robbery (Note: Also beat the victim in the head and body with a piece of timber, fracturing his skull and nose, and gouging out one of his eyes.)	Allen W. Eubanks, 72, white	Marvin Griffin
Walter Philpott	Black	39	M	January 27, 1956	Muscogee	Murder	Lloyd Lockhart, 48, black (step-father)	Marvin Griffin
Aubrey Williams	Black	29	M	March 30, 1956	Fulton	Murder-Robbery	Harry Furst, 65, white	Marvin Griffin
William Grady Cochrane	White	37	M	April 13, 1956	Bartow	Murder-Rape-Kidnap	Patricia Ann Cook, 14, white (Note: Serial rapist, previously convicted of both rape and felonious assault with intent to commit rape and was on parole from a 20-year sentence at time of crime.)	Marvin Griffin
James Turner	Black	27	M	June 8, 1956	Calhoun	Murder-Robbery	Joe Richardson, 73, black	Marvin Griffin
Frederick Mosley	Black	25	M	June 29, 1956	Fulton	Rape	Thelma Irene Knott, white (Note: Serial rapist, also committed another similar attack on Christine Smith (white) 4 months later; known as the "Laundromat Rapist" due to the locations of both crimes.)	Marvin Griffin
Paul Cooper	Black	48	M	September 21, 1956	Worth	Murder	Mary Cooper, 34, black (wife) (Note: Previously convicted of killing Red Rock, also black.)	Marvin Griffin
Amos Reese	Black	31	M	January 4, 1957	Cobb	Rape	Female, white (Note: Previously convicted of two counts of attempted rape.)	Marvin Griffin
John F. Corbin	White	32	M	February 8, 1957	Fulton	Murder-Robbery	Oscar Marion Roebuck, 20, white	Marvin Griffin
Jennings E. Fields	White	32	M	March 5, 1957	DeKalb	Murder	James Lonnie Mize, 48, white (police officer)	Marvin Griffin
John Newberry	White	47	M	March 8, 1957	Miller	Murder	Willie Mae Welch Newberry, 44, white (wife)	Marvin Griffin
Isaac Styles	Black	34	M	March 15, 1957	Burke	Murder	Annie Smith, 25, black (girlfriend)	Marvin Griffin
Leon I. Domingo	Black	23	M	March 15, 1957	Muscogee	Murder	Harold O. Stewart, 26, white	Marvin Griffin
Robert Lee Elder	Black	37	M	March 19, 1957	Fulton	Murder	Mabel Jordan, 40, black (common-law wife) (Note: Also murdered Jordan's 23-year-old daughter, Catherine.)	Marvin Griffin
James Toler	Black	39	M	March 19, 1957	Fulton	Murder-Robbery	Mary Inez Johnson, 30, white	Marvin Griffin
Don Mitchell Colman	Black	18	M	March 19, 1957	Fulton	Murder-Robbery	Mary Inez Johnson, 30, white	Marvin Griffin
Harold E. Hill	White	25	M	March 25, 1957	Richmond	Murder-Robbery	Frederick William Noegel Sr., 66, white	Marvin Griffin
Grady Justice	Black	29	M	July 26, 1957	Fulton	Rape	Pauline Lewis, 49, white (Note: Serial rapist, attempted to rape two other white white women. Previously suspected of raping another white woman and a 7-year-old white girl.)	Marvin Griffin
Michael Krull	White	33	M	August 21, 1957	N/A (Federal)	Rape (Note: Last federal executions for rape.)	Sunie Jones, 53, white	Marvin Griffin
George Krull	White	36	M	August 21, 1957	N/A (Federal)	Rape	Sunie Jones, 53, white	Marvin Griffin
Fred G. Mullins	Black	41	M	September 6, 1957	Harris	Murder	Madie Mullins, 39, black (wife)	Marvin Griffin
Lem Dupree	Black	59	M	September 16, 1957	Laurens	Murder	Annie Smith, 47, black	Marvin Griffin
John Henry White	Black	26	M	October 4, 1957	Berrien	Rape-Burglary	Female, 18, white	Marvin Griffin
Edward S. Smith	Black	23	M	January 17, 1958	Richmond	Rape	Female, 15, white (Note: Serial rapist, also charged with forcible rape and three counts of felonious assault with intent to commit rape.)	Marvin Griffin
William Golden	Black	23	M	April 18, 1958	Chatham	Murder-Robbery	William E. Fonvielle, 37, black	Marvin Griffin
Albert Curry	Black	26	M	September 19, 1958	Harris	Murder-Robbery	John C. Grant, 67, white	Marvin Griffin
Leroy Dobbs	Black	36	M	November 7, 1958	Cobb	Rape	Female, 23, white	Marvin Griffin
Otha A. Adams	White	54	M	November 14, 1958	Colquitt	Murder	Harris Hagin Jr., 3, white (Note: Also murdered Harris's mother and sister, 45-year-old Mary Adams Hagin and 11-month-old Brenda Diane Hagin.)	Marvin Griffin
Henry R. Woods	Black	20	M	December 19, 1958	Fulton	Murder-Robbery	Joy Lee McCord, 25, white	Marvin Griffin
J. C. Murray	Black	54	M	February 6, 1959	Bryan	Murder	Melvin Dewey Abbott, 58, white	Ernest Vandiver
Frank Junior Hill	Black	36	M	June 5, 1959	Dougherty	Murder	Gussie M. Porter, 43, black	Ernest Vandiver
William Charlton	Black	23	M	August 7, 1959	Chatham	Murder-Robbery	Sergeant Pearly Tatum, 38, white	Ernest Vandiver
Eddie Wilson	Black	37	M	December 18, 1959	Atkinson	Murder	Mary L. Wilson, 27, black (wife)	Ernest Vandiver
Homer Bunckley	Black	26	M	January 15, 1960	Talbot	Robbery (Note: Also struck the victim in the head, fracturing her skull and leaving her in critical condition.)	Ruby Anderson, 64, white	Ernest Vandiver
Ernest Albert	White	34	M	March 4, 1960	Columbia	Murder-Robbery	Cullen E. Purvis, 56, white	Ernest Vandiver
Frank Wilson	Black	54	M	June 10, 1960	Warren	Murder	LeRoy Toulson, 51, white	Ernest Vandiver
Herring Davis	Black	40	M	June 24, 1960	Meriwether	Murder-Robbery	George Frank Hall Sr., 81, white	Ernest Vandiver
Nathaniel Johnson	Black	25	M	July 1, 1960	Richmond	Rape-Kidnap	Female, white (Note: Previously raped another white woman in August 1956.)	Ernest Vandiver
Oscar J. Wimis	Black	44	M	November 21, 1960	Fulton	Murder-Robbery	Lovette Pierce Blackmon, 60, white	Ernest Vandiver
Roy Lee Mullins	White	24	M	January 20, 1961	Fannin	Murder	Hobert Luther Brown, 39, white (police officer)	Ernest Vandiver
Thurmond Johnson	Black	26	M	March 24, 1961	Richmond	Murder	Ella Louise Cummings, 70, black	Ernest Vandiver
George Watt	Black	21	M	August 11, 1961	Muscogee	Rape-Burglary	Female, 23, white (Note: Victim was pregnant. Also attempted to rape two other white women.)	Ernest Vandiver
Sammie Lee Smith	Black	27	M	November 14, 1962	Houston	Murder	Jerry Cooper, 33, black	Ernest Vandiver
Orleander Jones	Black	19	M	October 4, 1963	Jasper	Murder-Robbery	Anastasia Tyler Smith, 44, white	Ernest Vandiver
Ollie Chandler	Black	18	M	October 18, 1963	Lowndes	Murder	Hugh N. Lane Jr., 49, white	Carl Sanders
J. W. Pugh	White	35	M	January 14, 1964	DeKalb	Murder	Gottlieb Pistor, 38, white (girlfriend's husband)	Carl Sanders
Bernard Dye	White	34	M	October 16, 1964	McDuffie	Murder	Otis Durham Rabun Sr., 28, white	Carl Sanders

== See also ==
- Capital punishment in Georgia (U.S. state)
- Crime in Georgia
