= 1916 United States gubernatorial elections =

← 1915	November 7, 1916; September 11, 1916 (ME)	1917 →

36 governorships
	Majority party	Minority party
Party	Democratic	Republican
Seats before	28	19
Seats after	25	21
Seat change	▼3	▲2
Seats up	19	17
Seats won	16	19
	Third party
Party	Prohibition
Seats before	0
Seats after	1
Seat change	▲1
Seats up	0
Seats won	1
- Democratic gain Democratic hold Republican gain Republican hold Prohibition gain

United States gubernatorial elections were held in 1916, in 36 states, concurrent with the House, Senate elections and presidential election, on November 7, 1916. Elections took place on September 11 in Maine.

In New Mexico, the governor was elected to a two-year term for the first time, instead of a four-year term. In Arkansas and Georgia, the gubernatorial election was held on the same day as federal elections for the first time, having previously been held in September and October, respectively.

== Results ==
State	Incumbent	Party	Status	Opposing candidates
Arizona	George W. P. Hunt	Democratic	Defeated, 47.94% (Note: Hunt challenged the result and, following a recount by the Arizona Supreme Court, was declared the winner and took office on 25 December 1917.)	Thomas Edward Campbell (Republican) 47.99% Peter T. Robertson (Socialist) 3.39% Robert E. Dunlap (Prohibition) 0.68%
Arkansas	George Washington Hays	Democratic	Retired, Democratic victory	Charles H. Brough (Democratic) 69.45% Wallace Townsend (Republican) 25.02% William Davis (Socialist) 5.54%
Colorado	George A. Carlson	Republican	Defeated, 41.28%	Julius C. Gunter (Democratic) 53.27% C. Goddard (Socialist) 4.38% Louis E. Leeder (Liberal) 1.06%
Connecticut	Marcus H. Holcomb	Republican	Re-elected, 51.12%	Morris Beardsley (Democratic) 45.27% Herbert Beebe (Socialist) 2.48% G. Whitfield Simonson (Prohibition) 0.84% Charles B. Wells (Socialist Labor) 0.29%
Delaware	Charles R. Miller	Republican	Retired, Republican victory	John G. Townsend Jr. (Republican) 52.07% James H. Hughes (Democratic) 46.97% Frank A. Houck (Socialist) 0.96%
Florida	Park Trammell	Democratic	Term-limited, Prohibition victory	Sidney J. Catts (Prohibition) 47.71% William V. Knott (Democratic) 36.61% George W. Allen (Republican) 12.47% C. C. Allen (Socialist) 2.98% Noel A. Mitchell (Independent) 0.23%
Georgia	Nathaniel Edwin Harris	Democratic	Defeated in Democratic primary, Democratic victory	Hugh M. Dorsey (Democratic) 96.45% Roscoe Pickett (Republican) 2.91% Thomas M. Taylor (Socialist) 0.64% (Democratic primary results); Hugh M. Dorsey 51.34% (245); Nathaniel E. Harris 32.53% (119); Lamartine Griffin Hardman 12.84% (8); Joseph E. Pottle 3.29% (8)
Idaho	Moses Alexander	Democratic	Re-elected, 47.49%	David W. Davis (Republican) 47.07% Annie E. Triplow (Socialist) 5.44%
Illinois	Edward F. Dunne	Democratic	Defeated, 42.09%	Frank O. Lowden (Republican) 52.67% Seymour Stedman (Socialist) 3.96% John R. Golden (Prohibition) 1.16% John M. Francis (Socialist Labor) 0.13%
Indiana	Samuel M. Ralston	Democratic	Term-limited, Republican victory	James P. Goodrich (Republican) 47.80% John A. M. Adair (Democratic) 46.00% William W. Farmer (Socialist) 3.14% Alfred L. Mondy (Prohibition) 2.19% Thomas A. Dalley (Progressive) 0.65% Joe B. Trunko (Socialist Labor) 0.22% Scattering 0.01%
Iowa	George W. Clarke	Republican	Retired, Republican victory	William L. Harding (Republican) 61.03% Edwin T. Meredith (Democratic) 36.36% John W. Bennett (Socialist) 1.60% Oren D. Ellett (Prohibition) 0.56% Stephen H. Bashor (Progressive) 0.40% Arthur S. Dowler (Socialist Labor) 0.06%
Kansas	Arthur Capper	Republican	Re-elected, 60.77%	W. C. Lansdon (Democratic) 33.05% E. N. Richardson (Socialist) 3.88% Harry R. Ross (Prohibition) 2.30%
Maine (held, 11 September 1916)	Oakley C. Curtis	Democratic	Defeated, 44.87%	Carl E. Milliken (Republican) 54.00% Frank H. Maxfield (Socialist) 0.97% Liaus Seeley (Prohibition) 0.17%
Massachusetts	Samuel W. McCall	Republican	Re-elected, 52.45%	Frederick W. Mansfield (Democratic) 43.67% Dan White (Socialist) 2.01% Chester R. Lawrence (Prohibition) 1.13% James Hayes (Socialist Labor) 0.74%
Michigan	Woodbridge N. Ferris	Democratic	Retired, Republican victory	Albert E. Sleeper (Republican) 55.83% Edwin F. Sweet (Democratic) 40.59% Ernest J. Moore (Socialist) 2.31% E. W. Woodruff (Prohibition) 1.11% James R. Murray (Socialist Labor) 0.15% Henry R. Pattengill (Progressive) 0.02%
Minnesota	Joseph A. A. Burnquist	Republican	Re-elected, 62.94%	Thomas P. Dwyer (Democratic) 23.84% J. O. Bentall (Socialist) 6.73% Thomas J. Anderson (Prohibition) 5.09% John P. Johnson (Industrial Labor) 1.40%
Missouri	Elliot Woolfolk Major	Democratic	Term-limited, Democratic victory	Frederick D. Gardner (Democratic) 48.65% Henry Lamm (Republican) 48.36% William J. Adames (Socialist) 1.85% Joseph P. Fontron (Progressive) 0.51% William H. Yount (Prohibition) 0.51% Charles Rogers (Socialist Labor) 0.12%
Montana	Samuel V. Stewart	Democratic	Re-elected, 49.36%	Frank J. Edwards (Republican) 44.10% Lewis J. Duncan (Socialist) 6.53%
Nebraska	John H. Morehead	Democratic	Retired, Democratic victory	Keith Neville (Democratic) 49.27% Abraham L. Sutton (Republican) 46.95% Benjamin Z. Millikan (Socialist) 2.34% Julian D. Graves (Prohibition) 1.45%
New Hampshire	Rolland H. Spaulding	Republican	Retired, Republican victory	Henry W. Keyes (Republican) 53.20% John C. Hutchins (Democratic) 45.08% William H. Wilkins (Socialist) 1.39% Ralph E. Meras (Prohibition) 0.33%
New Jersey	James Fairman Fielder	Democratic	Term-limited, Republican victory	Walter E. Edge (Republican) 55.44% H. Otto Wittpenn (Democratic) 39.83% Frederick Krafft (Socialist) 2.89% Harry Vaughan (Prohibition) 1.32% John C. Butterworth (Socialist Labor) 0.52%
New Mexico	William C. McDonald	Democratic	Retired to run for lieutenant governor, Democratic victory	Ezequiel C. De Baca (Democratic) 49.40% Holm O. Bursum (Republican) 47.42% N. A. Wells (Socialist) 3.18%
New York	Charles S. Whitman	Republican	Re-elected, 52.63%	Samuel Seabury (Democratic) 42.53% Algernon Lee (Socialist) 3.25% Charles E. Welch (Prohibition) 1.35% Jeremiah D. Crowley (Socialist Labor) 0.24%
North Carolina	Locke Craig	Democratic	Term-limited, Democratic victory	Thomas W. Bickett (Democratic) 58.15% Frank A. Linney (Republican) 41.65% L. Miller (Socialist) 0.21%
North Dakota	L. B. Hanna	Republican	Retired to run for U.S. Senate, Republican victory	Lynn J. Frazier (Republican) 79.24% D. H. McArthur (Democratic) 18.40% Oscar A. Johnson (Socialist) 2.36%
Ohio	Frank B. Willis	Republican	Defeated, 47.83%	James M. Cox (Democratic) 48.40% Tom Clifford (Socialist) 3.14% John H. Dickason (Prohibition) 0.63%
Rhode Island	R. Livingston Beeckman	Republican	Re-elected, 55.92%	Addison P. Munroe (Democratic) 40.83% John H. Holloway (Socialist) 2.45% Roscoe W. Phillips (Prohibition) 0.59% Thomas F. Herrick (Socialist Labor) 0.23%
South Carolina	Richard Irvine Manning III	Democratic	Re-elected	Richard Irvine Manning III (Democratic) 97.91% Coleman Livingston Blease (Independent) 1.77% J. C. Gibbes (Socialist) 0.26% J. M. Cantey (Independent) 0.06% (Democratic primary run-off results); Richard Irvine Manning III 51.69% Coleman Livingston Blease 48.31%
South Dakota	Frank M. Byrne	Republican	Retired, Republican victory	Peter Norbeck (Republican) 56.64% Orville Rinehart (Democratic) 39.33% Fred L. Fairchild (Socialist) 2.77% C. K. Thompson (Prohibition) 1.27%
Tennessee	Thomas C. Rye	Democratic	Re-elected, 55.04%	John W. Overall (Republican) 44.19% Scattering 0.78%
Texas	James E. Ferguson	Democratic	Re-elected, 81.60%	R. B. Creager (Republican) 13.51% E. R. Meitzen (Socialist) 4.01% H. W. Lewis (Prohibition) 0.88%
Utah	William Spry	Republican	[data missing]	Simon Bamberger (Democratic) 55.12% Nephi L. Morris (Republican) 41.80% F. M. McHugh (Socialist) 3.08%
Vermont	Charles W. Gates	Republican	Retired to run for U.S. Senate, Republican victory	Horace F. Graham (Republican) 71.10% William B. Mayo (Democratic) 25.95% William R. Rowland (Socialist) 1.51% Lester W. Hanson (Prohibition) 1.44% Scattering 0.01%
Washington	Ernest Lister	Democratic	Re-elected, 48.10%	Henry McBride (Republican) 44.44% Ludwig E. Katterfeld (Socialist) 5.61% August B. L. Gellerman (Prohibition) 0.93% James Bradford (Progressive) 0.77% James E. Riordan (Socialist Labor) 0.17%
West Virginia	Henry D. Hatfield	Republican	Term-limited, Democratic victory	John Jacob Cornwell (Democratic) 49.55% Ira E. Robinson (Republican) 48.59% D. M. S. Holt (Socialist) 1.87%
Wisconsin	Emanuel L. Philipp	Republican	Re-elected, 52.93%	Burt Williams (Democratic) 37.89% Rae Weaver (Socialist) 7.06% George McKerrow (Prohibition) 2.12% Scattering 0.01%

== See also ==
- 1916 United States elections
  - 1916 United States presidential election
  - 1916 United States Senate elections
  - 1916 United States House of Representatives elections
