= 1918 United States gubernatorial elections =

← 1917	November 5, 1918; September 9, 1918 (ME)	1919 →

32 governorships
	Majority party	Minority party
Party	Republican	Democratic
Seats before	22	25
Seats after	26	21
Seat change	▲4	▼4
Seats up	18	14
Seats won	22	10
- Democratic gain Democratic hold Republican gain Republican hold

United States gubernatorial elections were held in 1918, in 32 states, concurrent with the House and Senate elections, on November 5, 1918. Elections took place on September 9 in Maine.

== Results ==
State	Incumbent	Party	Status	Opposing candidates
Alabama	Charles Henderson	Democratic	Term-limited, Democratic victory	Thomas E. Kilby (Democratic) 80.21% Dallas B. Smith (Independent) 19.79% (Democratic primary results: after second preferences); Thomas E. Kilby 36.84% William W. Brandon 34.37% Charles B. Teasley 19.37% John H. Wallace Jr. 7.99% John Purifoy 1.42%
Arizona	George W. P. Hunt	Democratic	Retired, Republican victory	Thomas Edward Campbell (Republican) 49.90% Fred T. Colter (Democratic) 49.25% George D. Smith (Socialist) 0.86%
Arkansas	Charles H. Brough	Democratic	Re-elected, 93.43%	Clay Fulks (Socialist) 6.57% (Democratic primary results) √ Charles H. Brough; L. C. 'Judge' Smith [data missing]
California	William D. Stephens	Republican	Re-elected	William D. Stephens (Republican) 56.28% Theodore Arlington Bell (Independent) 36.48% Henry H. Roser (Socialist) 4.21% James Rolph Jr. (Democratic) (Note: Rolph, a Republican, ran for the Republican and Democratic nominations. He lost the Republican nomination and won the Democratic nomination. However, under California's crossfiling law, he could not be the Democratic nominee after losing the primary of his own party.) (write-in) 2.99% Scattering 0.05%
Colorado	Julius Caldeen Gunter	Democratic	Defeated in Democratic primary, Republican victory	Oliver Henry Nelson Shoup (Republican) 51.15% Thomas J. Tynan (Democratic) 46.47% Mary L. Geffs (Socialist) 2.38%
Connecticut	Marcus H. Holcomb	Republican	Re-elected, 50.72%	Thomas J. Spellacy (Democratic) 45.87% Martin F. Plunkett (Socialist) 2.39% John Newton Lackey (Prohibition) 0.61% Herman Klawansky (Socialist Labor) 0.34% George A. Parsons (National) 0.07%
Georgia	Hugh M. Dorsey	Democratic	Re-elected, unopposed	(Democratic primary results); Hugh M. Dorsey (unopposed)
Idaho	Moses Alexander	Democratic	Retired, Republican victory	David W. Davis (Republican) 59.95% H. F. Samuels (Democratic) 40.05%
Iowa	William L. Harding	Republican	Re-elected, 50.55%	Claude R. Porter (Democratic) 46.92% Andrew Engle (Socialist) 2.10% M. L. Christian (Prohibition) 0.43%
Kansas	Arthur Capper	Republican	Retired to run for U.S. Senate, Republican victory	Henry J. Allen (Republican) 66.39% W. C. Lansdon (Democratic) 30.68% George W. Kleihege (Socialist) 2.94%
Maine (held, 9 September 1918)	Carl E. Milliken	Republican	Re-elected, 52.04%	Bertrand G. McIntire (Democratic) 47.96%
Massachusetts	Samuel W. McCall	Republican	Retired to run for U.S. Senate, Republican victory	Calvin Coolidge (Republican) 50.87% Richard H. Long (Democratic) 46.84% Sylvester J. McBride (Socialist) 1.84% Ingvar Paulsen (Socialist Labor) 0.45%
Michigan	Albert E. Sleeper	Republican	Re-elected, 61.41%	John W. Bailey (Democratic) 36.41% Ernest J. Moore (Socialist) 1.63% John S. McColl (Prohibition) 0.38% John Hinds (Socialist Labor) 0.18%
Minnesota	Joseph A. A. Burnquist	Republican	Re-elected, 45.04%	David H. Evans (Farmer-Labor) 30.28% Fred E. Wheaton (Democratic) 20.77% L. P. Berot (Socialist) 2.11% Olaf O. Stageberg (National) 1.80%
Nebraska	Keith Neville	Democratic	Defeated, 44.00%	Samuel R. McKelvie (Republican) 54.47% Julian D. Graves (Prohibition) 1.53%
Nevada	Emmet D. Boyle	Democratic	Re-elected, 52.08%	Tasker L. Oddie (Republican) 47.92%
New Hampshire	Henry W. Keyes	Republican	Retired to run for U.S. Senate, Republican victory	John H. Bartlett (Republican) 54.13% Nathaniel E. Martin (Democratic) 45.86% Scattering 0.01%
New Mexico	Washington Lindsey	Republican	Lost renomination, Republican victory	Octaviano Ambrosio Larrazolo (Republican) 50.50% Felix Garcia (Democratic) 47.70% A. H. Moulton (Socialist) 1.80%
New York	Charles S. Whitman	Republican	Defeated, 46.68%	Alfred E. Smith (Democratic) 47.37% Charles W. Ervin (Socialist) 5.71% Olive M. Johnson (Socialist Labor) 0.24%
North Dakota	Lynn J. Frazier	Republican	Re-elected, 59.75%	S. J. Doyle (Democratic) 40.26%
Ohio	James M. Cox	Democratic	Re-elected, 50.62%	Frank B. Willis (Republican) 49.38%
Oklahoma	Robert L. Williams	Democratic	Term-limited, Democratic victory	James B. A. Robertson (Democratic) 53.55% Horace G. McKeever (Republican) 42.63% Patrick S. Nagle (Socialist) 3.83%
Oregon	James Withycombe	Republican	Re-elected, 52.99%	Walter M. Pierce (Democratic) 42.78% Benjamin Franklin Ramp (Socialist) 4.24%
Pennsylvania	Martin Grove Brumbaugh	Republican	Term-limited, Republican victory	William Cameron Sproul (Republican) 61.05% Eugene C. Bonniwell (Democratic) 33.74% Edwin J. Fithian (Prohibition) 3.02% Charles Sehl (Socialist) 2.07% Robert C. Macauley Jr. (Single Tax) 0.12%
Rhode Island	R. Livingston Beeckman	Republican	Re-elected, 53.11%	Alberic A. Archambault (Democratic) 44.84% Ernest Sherwood (Socialist) 2.05%
South Carolina	Richard Irvine Manning III	Democratic	Retired, Democratic victory	Robert Archer Cooper (Democratic) unopposed (Democratic primary results); Robert Archer Cooper 57.96% John Gardiner Richards 29.24% Andrew J. Bethea 9.70% Scattering 3.10%
South Dakota	Peter Norbeck	Republican	Re-elected, 53.22%	Mark P. Bates (Independent) 26.12% James B. Bird (Democratic) 18.57% Knute Lewis (Independent) 1.32% Orville Anderson (Socialist) 0.77%
Tennessee	Thomas C. Rye	Democratic	Retired to run for U.S. Senate, Democratic victory	Albert H. Roberts (Democratic) 62.37% Hugh B. Lindsay (Republican) 37.64%
Texas	William Pettus Hobby	Democratic	Re-elected, 84.00%	Charles A. Boynton (Republican) 15.06% William D. Simpson (Socialist) 0.94%
Vermont	Horace F. Graham	Republican	Retired, Republican victory	Percival Wood Clement (Republican) 67.00% William B. Mayo (Democratic) 32.75% Scattering 0.25%
Wisconsin	Emanuel L. Philipp	Republican	Re-elected, 46.99%	Henry A. Moehlenpah (Democratic) 33.95% Emil Seidel (Socialist) 17.35% William C. Dean (Prohibition) 1.60% Scattering 0.12%
Wyoming	Frank L. Houx	Democratic	Defeated, 43.90%	Robert D. Carey (Republican) 56.11%

== See also ==
- 1918 United States elections
  - 1918 United States Senate elections
  - 1918 United States House of Representatives elections
