= 1914 United States gubernatorial elections =

← 1913	November 3, 1914 (Note: Arkansas, Georgia, and Maine held elections earlier in the year.)	1915 →

31 governorships
	Majority party	Minority party
Party	Democratic	Republican
Seats before	30	16
Seats after	29	18
Seat change	▼1	▲2
Seats up	17	12
Seats won	16	14
	Third party
Party	Progressive
Seats before	2
Seats after	1
Seat change	▼1
Seats up	2
Seats won	1
- Democratic gain Democratic hold Republican gain Republican hold Progressive hold

United States gubernatorial elections were held in 1914, in 31 states, concurrent with the House and Senate elections, on November 3, 1914 (except for Arkansas and Maine, where they were held on September 14, and Georgia, where they were held on October 7).

In Arizona, the governor was elected to a two-year term for the first time, having been elected to an inaugural three-year term at the first election in 1911. In Vermont, the gubernatorial election was held on the same day as federal elections for the first time, having previously been held in September. In Arkansas and Georgia, the gubernatorial election was held in September and October, respectively, for the last time, moving to the same day as federal elections from the 1916 elections.

== Results ==
State	Incumbent	Party	Status	Opposing candidates
Alabama	Emmet O'Neal	Democratic	Term-limited, Democratic victory	Charles Henderson (Democratic) 83.89% John B. Shields (Republican) 16.11%
Arizona	George W. P. Hunt	Democratic	Re-elected, 49.46%	Ralph Henry Cameron (Republican) 34.51% George U. Young (Progressive) 10.21% J. R. Barnette (Socialist) 5.83%
Arkansas (held, 14 September 1914)	George W. Hays	Democratic	Re-elected, 69.47%	Audrey L. Kinney (Republican) 22.84% Dan Hogan (Socialist) 7.70%
California	Hiram W. Johnson	Progressive	Re-elected, 49.69%	John D. Fredericks (Republican) 29.35% John Barry Curtin (Democratic) 12.53% Noble A. Richardson (Socialist) 5.47% Clinton P. Moore (Prohibition) 2.95%
Colorado	Elias M. Ammons	Democratic	Retired, Republican victory	George A. Carlson (Republican) 48.67% Thomas M. Patterson (Democratic) 34.17% Edward P. Costigan (Progressive) 12.41% Abraham Marions (Socialist) 3.97% L. D. Hosman (Socialist Labor) 0.78%
Connecticut	Simeon E. Baldwin	Democratic	Retired to run for U.S. Senate, Republican victory	Marcus H. Holcomb (Republican) 50.39% Lyman T. Tingier (Democratic) 40.80% W. Fisher (Progressive) 4.43% Samuel E. Beardsley (Socialist) 3.27% Duane N. Griffin (Prohibition) 0.76% Charles B. Wells (Socialist Labor) 0.35%
Georgia (held, 7 October 1914)	John M. Slaton	Democratic	Retired, Democratic victory	Nathaniel E. Harris (Democratic) 100.00% (Democratic primary results); Nathaniel E. Harris 44.23% Lamartine Griffin Hardman 35.62% J. Randolph Anderson 20.14%
Idaho	John M. Haines	Republican	Defeated, 37.39%	Moses Alexander (Democratic) 44.13% Hugh E. McElroy (Progressive) 9.81% L. A. Coblentz (Socialist) 7.38% Scattering 1.29%
Iowa	George W. Clarke	Republican	Re-elected, 49.31%	John Taylor Hamilton (Democratic) 42.94% George C. White (Progressive) 3.98% Oliver C. Wilson (Socialist) 2.14% Malcolm Smith (Prohibition) 1.62%
Kansas	George H. Hodges	Democratic	Defeated, 30.61%	Arthur Capper (Republican) 39.67% Henry Justin Allen (Progressive) 15.91% Julius B. Billard (Independent) 8.94% Milo M. Mitchell (Socialist) 3.86% Sials W. Bond (Prohibition) 1.01%
Maine (held, 14 September 1914)	William T. Haines	Republican	Defeated, 41.57%	Oakley C. Curtis (Democratic) 43.82% Halbert P. Gardner (Progressive) 12.87% Percy F. Morse (Socialist) 1.33% Frederick A. Shepherd (Prohibition) 0.42%
Massachusetts	David I. Walsh	Democratic	Re-elected, 45.93%	Samuel W. McCall (Republican) 43.35% Joseph H. Walker (Progressive) 7.02% Samuel C. Roberts (Socialist) 2.08% Alfred H. Evans (Prohibition) 1.15% Arthur Elmer Reimer (Socialist Labor) 0.48%
Michigan	Woodbridge N. Ferris	Democratic	Re-elected, 48.15%	Chase S. Osborn (Republican) 40.02% Henry R. Pattengill (Progressive) 8.34% James Hoogerhyde (Socialist) 2.51% Charles N. Eayrs (Prohibition) 0.87% Herman Richter (Socialist Labor) 0.11%
Minnesota	Adolph O. Eberhart	Republican	Defeated in Republican primary, Democratic victory	Winfield Scott Hammond (Democratic) 45.54% William E. Lee (Republican) 41.87% Willis Greenleaf Calderwood (Prohibition) 5.41% Thomas J. Lewis (Socialist) 5.02% Herbert Johnson (Industrial Labor) 1.13% Hugh T. Halbert (Progressive) 1.04%
Nebraska	John H. Morehead	Democratic	Re-elected, 50.35%	Robert B. Howell (Republican) 42.41% Harry E. Sackett (Progressive) 3.63% George C. Porter (Socialist) 2.41% Nathan Wilson (Prohibition) 1.20%
Nevada	Tasker L. Oddie	Republican	Defeated, 39.61%	Emmet D. Boyle (Democratic) 44.65% W. A. Morgan (Socialist) 15.74%
New Hampshire	Samuel D. Felker	Democratic	Retired, Republican victory	Rolland H. Spaulding (Republican) 55.18% Albert W. Noone (Democratic) 40.04% Henry D. Allison (Progressive) 3.06% John P. Burke (Socialist) 1.69% Scattering 0.03%
New York	Martin H. Glynn	Democratic	Defeated, 37.59%	Charles S. Whitman (Republican) 47.69% William Sulzer (American/Prohibition) 8.77% Frederick M. Davenport (Progressive) 3.17% Gustave A. Strebel (Socialist) 2.63% James T. Hunter (Socialist Labor) 0.16%
North Dakota	Louis B. Hanna	Republican	Re-elected, 49.58%	Frank O. Hellstrom (Democratic) 38.91% J. A. Williams (Socialist) 6.74% Hans H. Aaker (Prohibition) 4.77%
Ohio	James M. Cox	Democratic	Defeated, 43.73%	Frank B. Willis (Republican) 46.32% James Rudolph Garfield (Progressive) 5.39% Scott Wilkins (Socialist) 4.56%
Oklahoma	Lee Cruce	Democratic	Term-limited, Democratic victory	Robert L. Williams (Democratic) 39.65% John Fields (Republican) 37.81% Fred W. Holt (Socialist) 20.78% John P. Hickam (Progressive) 1.65% Amos L. Wilson (Independent) 0.08% T. J. Woods (Independent) 0.04%
Oregon	Oswald West	Democratic	Retired, Republican victory	James Withycombe (Republican) 48.80% C. J. Smith (Democratic) 38.14% W. J. Smith (Socialist) 5.76% William S. U'Ren (Independent) 4.23% F. M. Gill (Progressive) 2.47% Will E. Purdy (Non-partisan) 0.61%
Pennsylvania	John K. Tener	Republican	Term-limited, Republican victory	Martin G. Brumbaugh (Republican) 52.98% Vance C. McCormick (Democratic) 40.84% Joseph B. Allen (Socialist) 3.61% Matthew H. Stevenson (Prohibition) 1.57% William Draper Lewis ("Roosevelt Progressive") 0.59% Scattering 0.41%
Rhode Island	Aram J. Pothier	Republican	Retired, Republican victory	R. Livingston Beeckman (Republican) 53.80% Patrick H. Quinn (Democratic) 41.23% Edward W. Theinert (Socialist) 2.17% F. D. Thompson (Progressive) 1.65% Ernest L. Merry (Prohibition) 0.80% Peter McDermott (Socialist Labor) 0.35%
South Carolina	Coleman Livingston Blease	Democratic	Retired to run for U.S. Senate, Republican victory	Richard Irvine Manning III (Democratic) 99.76% R. B. Britton (Socialist) 0.24% (Democratic primary run-off results); Richard Irvine Manning III 62.12% John Gardiner Richards 37.88%
South Dakota	Frank M. Byrne	Republican	Re-elected, 50.07%	James W. McCarter (Democratic) 35.20% Richard Olsen Richards (Independent) 9.91% J. C. Knapp (Socialist) 2.71% C. K. Thompson (Prohibition) 2.11%
Tennessee	Ben W. Hooper	Republican	Defeated, 45.80%	Thomas C. Rye (Democratic) 53.55% Scattering 0.65%
Texas	Oscar Branch Colquitt	Democratic	Retired, Democratic victory	James E. Ferguson (Democratic) 81.95% E. R. Meitzen (Socialist) 11.59% John W. Philip (Republican) 5.30% F. M. Etheridge (Progressive) 0.83% K. E. Choate (Socialist Labor) 0.32% Scattering 0.01% (Democratic primary results); James E. Ferguson 55.31% Thomas Henry Ball 44.69%
Vermont	Allen M. Fletcher	Republican	Retired, Republican victory	Charles Winslow Gates (Republican) 59.51% Harland Bradley Howe (Democratic) 26.06% Walter J. Aldrich (Progressive) 11.22% Clement F. Smith (Prohibition) 1.73% William R. Rowland (Socialist) 1.45% Scattering 0.04%
Wisconsin	Francis E. McGovern	Republican	Retired to run for U.S. Senate, Republican victory	Emanuel L. Philipp (Republican) 43.26% John C. Karel (Democratic) 36.72% John J. Blaine (Independent Progressive) 10.01% Oscar T. Ameringer (Social Democrat) 7.96% David W. Emerson (Prohibition) 1.93% John Vierthaler (Socialist Labor) 0.11% Scattering 0.01%
Wyoming	Joseph M. Carey	Progressive	Retired, Democratic victory	John B. Kendrick (Democratic) 51.61% Hilliard S. Ridgely (Republican) 44.20% Paul J. Paulson (Socialist) 4.19%

== See also ==
- 1914 United States elections
  - 1914 United States Senate elections
  - 1914 United States House of Representatives elections
