= 1918 United States elections =

- ← 1916 1917 1918 1919 1920 → Midterm elections
- Election day: November 5
- Incumbent president: ▌Woodrow Wilson (D)
- Next Congress: 66th

Senate elections
- Overall control: Republican gain
- Seats contested: 38 of 96 seats (32 Class 2 seats + 9 special elections)
- Net seat change: Republican +6
- 1918 Senate election results Democratic gain Democratic hold Republican gain Republican hold

House elections
- Overall control: Republican gain
- Seats contested: All 435 voting seats
- Net seat change: Republican +24
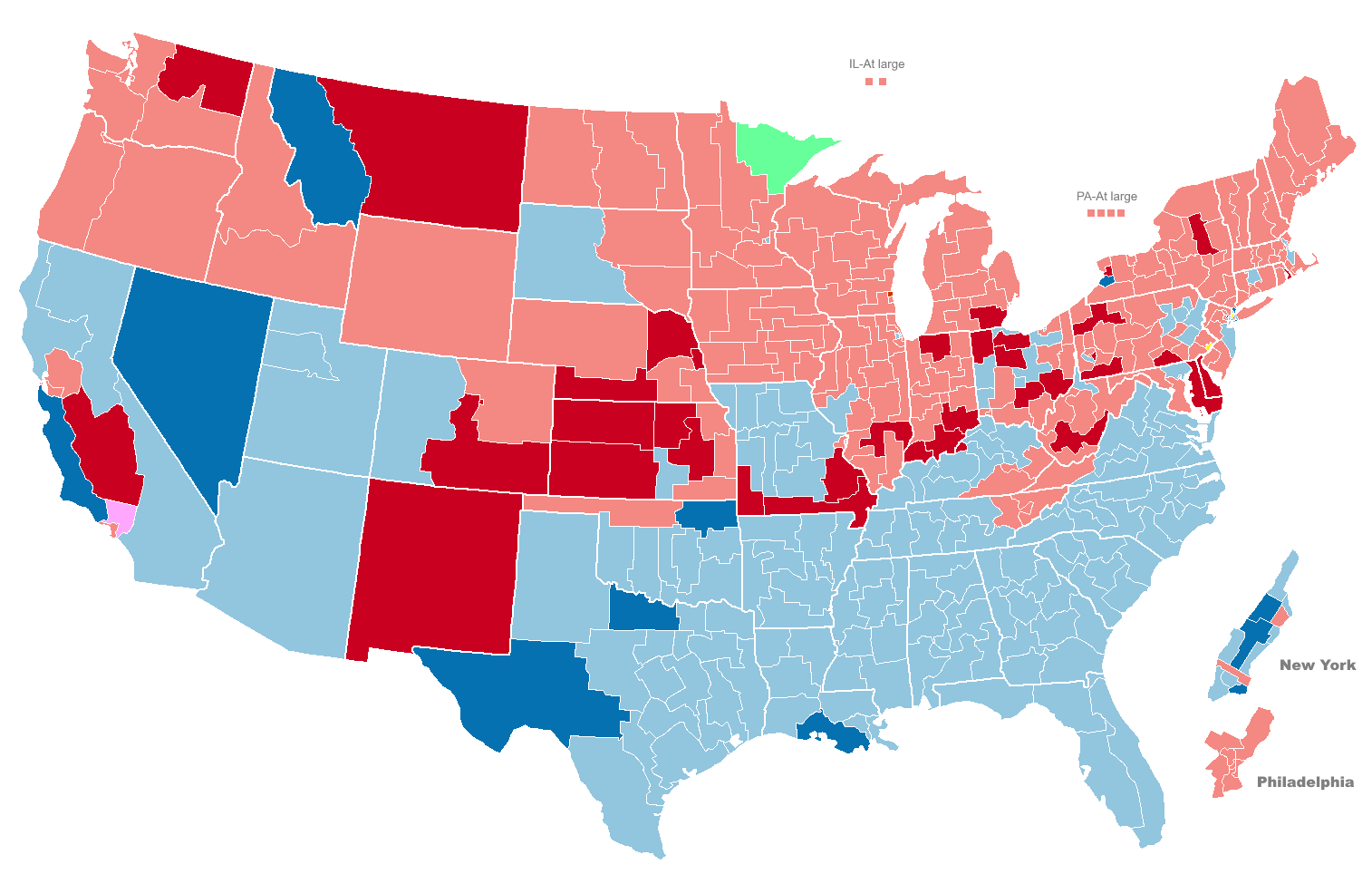
- 1918 House of Representatives results

Gubernatorial elections
- Seats contested: 32
- Net seat change: Republican +4
- 1918 gubernatorial election results Democratic gain Democratic hold Republican gain Republican hold

Elections were held for the 66th United States Congress, and took place in the middle of Democratic President Woodrow Wilson's second term. The election was held during the Fourth Party System. It was the lone election to take place during America's involvement in World War I. The Republicans won control of both chambers of Congress for the first time since the 1908 election.

The election took place during the Spanish flu pandemic. Campaigning was disrupted around the country. In Nebraska, for instance, the authorities lifted a ban on public gatherings in early November 1918 and permitted politicians to campaign five days prior to polls opening. The turnout was 40%, which was unusually low for a midterm election (turnout was at 52% and 50% in the 1910 and 1914 midterm elections). The low turnout was possibly due to the disruption caused by the pandemic.

In an example of the six-year itch phenomenon, Republicans took complete control of Congress from the Democrats. The Republicans won large gains in the House, taking 25 seats and ending coalition control of the chamber. In the Senate, Republicans gained 5 seats, taking control of the chamber by a slim majority.

The elections were a major defeat for progressives and Wilson's foreign policy agenda, and foreshadowed the Republican victory in the 1920 election. Republicans ran against the expanded wartime government and the Fourteen Points, especially Wilson's proposal for the League of Nations. The Republican victory left them in control of both houses of Congress until the 1930 election.

== State ballot initiatives ==
=== Women's suffrage ===
The election was also a turning point for women's suffrage in the United States: ballot initiatives to extend suffrage to women (among all-male electorates) were held in the states of Oklahoma, Louisiana, South Dakota, and Michigan. Of these initiatives, all but the one in Louisiana passed, and despite the ongoing pandemic, extensive grassroots organizing by suffragists meant they successfully campaigned against incumbent Senators who had refused to support the Nineteenth Amendment to the United States Constitution, including John W. Weeks of Massachusetts, who had been considered invincible, and Willard Saulsbury Jr. of Delaware.

=== Prohibition ===
A number of state level ballot initiatives were also held regarding prohibition with some banning outright while others banned it in certain cases. California held two simultaneously with the two failing with one proposing it be banned in bars/saloons while the other proposed banning the sale, manufacturing and purchasing of alcohol in California. The Washington measure which passed had an exemption to prohibition if alcohol was being used for religious purposes.

1918 state referendums on prohibitions
State	Status
California	Failed
Colorado	Passed
Florida	Passed
Minnesota	Failed
Missouri	Failed
Nevada	Passed
Ohio	Passed
Washington	Passed

== See also ==
- 1918 United States House of Representatives elections
- 1918 United States Senate elections
- 1918 United States gubernatorial elections
- Presidency of Woodrow Wilson
