= 1917 United States gubernatorial elections =

← 1916	November 6, 1917	1918 →

2 governorships
	Majority party	Minority party
Party	Democratic	Republican
Seats before	25 (Note: George W. P. Hunt (D) succeeded Arizona Governor Thomas Edward Campbell (R) whose election was overturned by the Arizona Supreme Court in December 1917.)	22 (Note: William Stephens (R) succeeded California Governor Hiram Johnson (Progressive) who resigned to take a seat in the U.S. Senate in March 1917.) (Note: Washington Ellsworth Lindsey (R) succeeded New Mexico Governor Ezequiel Cabeza De Baca (D) upon his death in office in February 1917.)
Seats after	25	22
Seat change	Steady	Steady
Seats up	1	1
Seats won	1	1
- Democratic hold Republican hold

United States gubernatorial elections were held on November 6, 1917, in two states. Virginia holds its gubernatorial elections in odd numbered years, every 4 years, following the United States presidential election year. Massachusetts at this time held gubernatorial elections every year. It would abandon this practice in 1920.

== Results ==
State	Incumbent	Party	Status	Opposing candidates
Massachusetts	Samuel W. McCall	Republican	Re-elected, 58.29%	Frederick W. Mansfield (Democratic) 34.97% John McCarty (Socialist) 4.28% James Hayes (Socialist Labor) 1.35% Chester R. Lawrence (Prohibition) 1.10%
Virginia	Henry Carter Stuart	Democratic	Term-limited, Democratic victory	Westmoreland Davis (Democratic) 71.47% T. J. Muncy (Republican) 27.77% Frank Smith (Socialist) 0.76%
