= 1916 United States elections =

- ← 1914 1915 1916 1917 1918 → Presidential election year
- Election day: November 7
- Incumbent president: ▌Woodrow Wilson (D)
- Next Congress: 65th

Presidential election
- Partisan control: Democratic hold
- Popular vote margin: Democratic +3.1%
- Electoral vote
- Woodrow Wilson (D): 277
- Charles Evans Hughes (R): 254
- 1916 presidential election results. Red denotes states won by Hughes, blue denotes states won by Wilson. Numbers indicate the electoral votes won by each candidate.

Senate elections
- Overall control: Democratic hold
- Seats contested: 35 of 96 seats (32 Class 1 seats + 3 special elections)
- Net seat change: Republican +2
- 1916 Senate results Democratic gain Democratic hold Republican gain Republican hold

House elections
- Overall control: Democratic hold
- Seats contested: All 435 voting members
- Net seat change: Republican +19
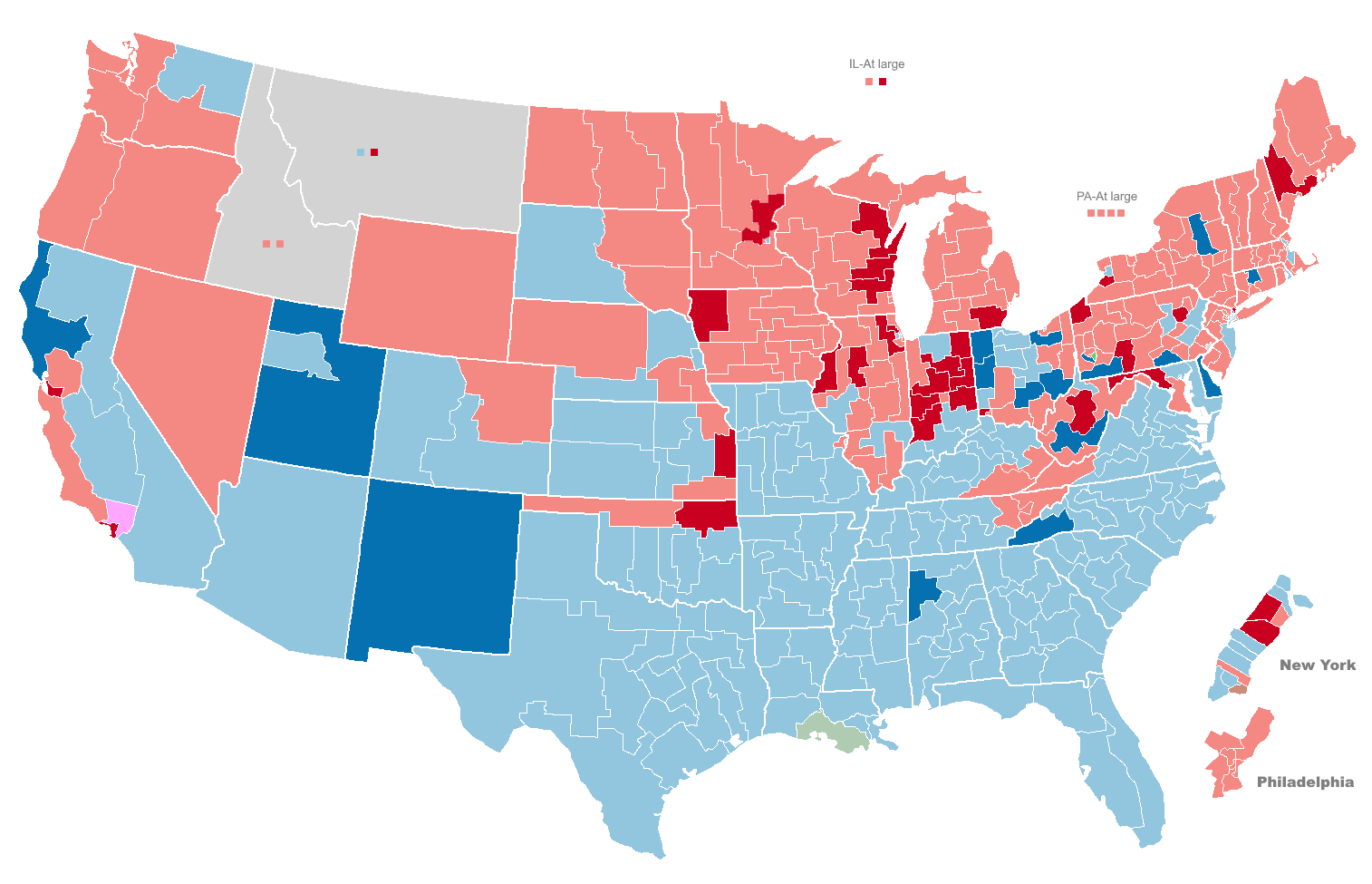
- 1916 House of Representatives results

Gubernatorial elections
- Seats contested: 36
- Net seat change: Republican +2
- 1916 gubernatorial election results Democratic gain Democratic hold Republican gain Republican hold Prohibition gain

Elections were held for the 65th United States Congress. The election occurred during the Fourth Party System, six months before the American entry into World War I (6 April, 1917). Unlike 1912, the Democrats did not benefit from a split in the Republican Party, but the Democrats still retained the presidency and the majority in the Senate. The Democrats lost the majority in the House, but retained control of the chamber.

The Democratic President Woodrow Wilson defeated the Republican nominee, former Supreme Court Justice Charles Evans Hughes, in the presidential election. Hughes won the Republican nomination on the third ballot of the 1916 Republican National Convention, defeating several other candidates. The Republicans won several states in the Northern United States, but Wilson's success in the rest of the country gave him a small margin in the electoral college and the popular vote. Wilson's win made him the first sitting Democratic president to win re-election since Andrew Jackson. Wilson's running mate, Thomas R. Marshall, was the first sitting vice president to win re-election since John C. Calhoun.

Republicans made moderate gains in the House, gaining a narrow plurality. However, Democrat Champ Clark won re-election as Speaker of the House.

In the second Senate election since the ratification of the 17th Amendment, Republicans made minor gains, but Democrats retained a solid majority.

== See also ==
- 1916 United States presidential election
- 1916 United States House of Representatives elections
- 1916 United States Senate elections
- 1916 United States gubernatorial elections
