= List of elections in 1917 =

The following elections occurred in the year 1917.

== Europe ==
- 1913 Danish local elections
- 1917 Dutch general election
- 1917 Finnish parliamentary election
- 1917 Russian Constituent Assembly election
- 1917 Sfatul Țării election
- 1917 Swedish general election
- 1917 Swiss federal election

=== United Kingdom ===
- 1917 Aberdeen South by-election
- 1917 Basingstoke by-election
- 1917 Cambridge by-election
- 1917 Dundee by-election
- 1917 Ealing by-election
- 1917 East Clare by-election
- 1917 Edinburgh and St Andrews Universities by-election
- 1917 Epping by-election
- 1917 Henley by-election
- 1917 Islington East by-election
- 1917 Kilkenny City by-election
- 1917 Liverpool Abercromby by-election
- 1917 North Armagh by-election
- 1917 North Roscommon by-election
- 1917 Norwich by-election
- 1917 Oxford by-election
- 1917 Rossendale by-election
- 1917 Salford North by-election
- 1917 South Dublin by-election
- 1917 South Longford by-election
- 1917 Southampton by-election
- 1917 Spalding by-election
- 1917 Stockton-on-Tees by-election
- 1917 Tamworth by-election
- 1917 West Perthshire by-election
- 1917 Wisbech by-election

== America ==
=== Bolivia ===
- 1917 Bolivian presidential election
- José Gutiérrez Guerra is elected President of Bolivia (predecessor: Ismael Montes Gamboa)

=== Canada ===
- 1917 Canadian federal election
- 1917 Alberta general election
- 1917 Edmonton municipal election
- 1917 New Brunswick general election
- 1917 Saskatchewan general election
- 1917 Toronto municipal election
- 1917 Yukon general election

=== United States ===
- 1917 New York state election

==== United States gubernatorial ====
- 1917 Massachusetts gubernatorial election
- 1917 United States gubernatorial elections
- 1917 Virginia gubernatorial election

==== United States House of Representatives ====
- 1917 United States House of Representatives elections

==== United States mayoral elections ====
- 1917 Boston mayoral election
- 1917 Los Angeles mayoral election
- 1917 Manchester, New Hampshire mayoral election
- 1917 New York City mayoral election
- 1917 Pittsburgh mayoral election
- 1917 San Diego mayoral election

== Oceania ==
=== Australia ===
- 1917 Australian Senate election
- 1917 Australian federal election
- 1917 Australian conscription referendum
- 1917 Darwin by-election
- 1917 Grampians by-election
- 1917 Gloucester state by-election
- 1917 Macquarie state by-election
- 1917 Murray state by-election
- 1917 New South Wales state election
- 1917 Newcastle state by-election
- 1917 Sturt state by-election
- 1917 Subiaco state by-election
- 1917 Victorian state election
- 1917 Western Australian state election

=== New Zealand ===
- 1917 Bay of Islands by-election
- 1917 Grey by-election
- 1917 Hawkes Bay by-election

== See also ==
- Category:1917 elections
