= 1914 United States elections =

Election for the 64th US Congress

- ← 1912 1913 1914 1915 1916 → Midterm elections
- Election day: November 3
- Incumbent president: ▌Woodrow Wilson (D)
- Next Congress: 64th

Senate elections
- Overall control: Democratic hold
- Seats contested: 33 of 96 seats (32 Class 3 seats + 3 special elections)
- Net seat change: Democratic +3
- 1914 Senate election results Democratic gain Democratic hold Republican hold

House elections
- Overall control: Democratic hold
- Seats contested: All 435 voting seats
- Net seat change: Republican +62
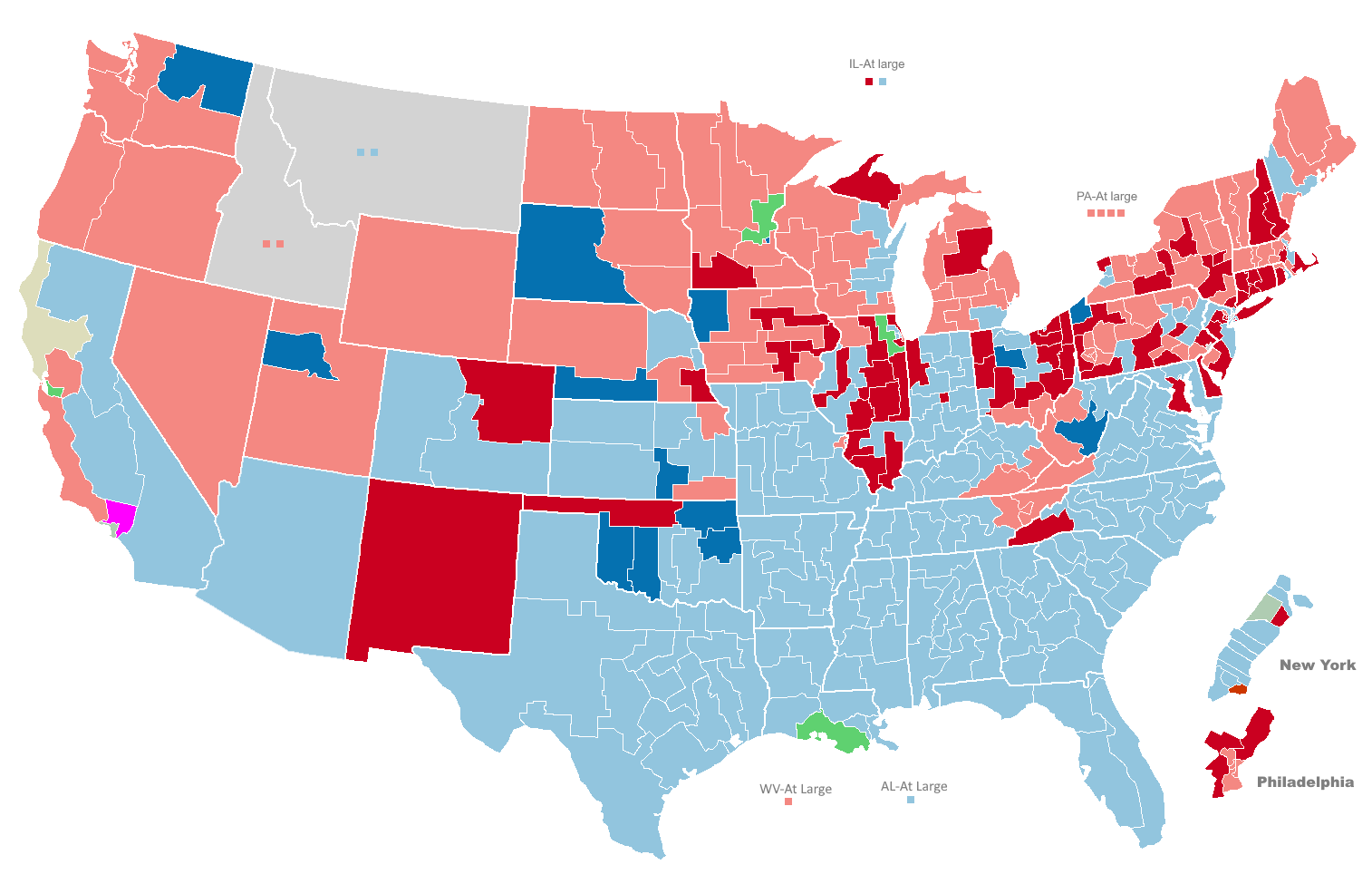
- 1914 House of Representatives results

Gubernatorial elections
- Seats contested: 31
- Net seat change: Republican +2
- 1914 gubernatorial election results Democratic gain Democratic hold Republican gain Republican hold Progressive hold

Elections were held for the 64th United States Congress, occurring in the middle of the Democratic President Woodrow Wilson's first term. The Democrats retained control of both houses of Congress, the first time they were able to do so since the American Civil War (1861–1865).

The Republicans won massive gains in the House, but the Democrats maintained a solid majority in the chamber.

In the first Senate election since the passage of the 17th Amendment, Democrats won small gains, maintaining control of the chamber. This would also be the first of five times since the passage of the 17th Amendment that the president's party gained Senate seats and lost House seats, something that would be repeated by Democrats in 1962 and 2022, and by Republicans in 1970 and 2018.

== See also ==
- 1914 United States House of Representatives elections
- 1914 United States Senate elections
- 1914 United States gubernatorial elections
