= 1915 United States gubernatorial elections =

← 1914	November 2, 1915; April 18, 1916 (LA)	1916 →

5 governorships
	Majority party	Minority party
Party	Democratic	Republican
Seats before	28	19 (Note: J. A. A. Burnquist (R) succeeded Minnesota Governor Winfield S. Hammond (D) upon his death in office in December 1915.)
Seats after	28	19
Seat change	Steady	Steady
Seats up	4	1
Seats won	4	1
- Democratic gain Democratic hold Republican gain

United States gubernatorial elections were held in 1915, in five states. Kentucky, Louisiana, Maryland and Mississippi held their gubernatorial elections in odd numbered years, every 4 years, preceding the United States presidential election year. Massachusetts elected its governors to a single-year term, switching to two-year-terms from the 1920 election.

== Results ==
State	Incumbent	Party	Status	Opposing candidates
Kentucky	James B. McCreary	Democratic	Term-limited, Democratic victory	Augustus O. Stanley (Democratic) 49.06% Edwin P. Morrow (Republican) 48.96% L. L. Pickett (Prohibition) 0.94% Charles Dobbs (Socialist) 0.74% Fred J. Drexler (Progressive) 0.31%
Louisiana (Held, 18 April 1916)	Luther E. Hall	Democratic	Term-limited, Democratic victory	Ruffin G. Pleasant (Democratic) 62.51% John Milliken Parker (Progressive) 37.20% Horace Noonan (Independent) 0.28% Scattering 0.02% (Democratic primary results); Ruffin G. Pleasant 73.71% Thomas C. Barret 26.29%
Maryland	Phillips Lee Goldsborough	Republican	Retired, Democratic victory	Emerson C. Harrington (Democratic) 49.57% Ovington E. Weller (Republican) 48.25% George B. Gorsuch (Prohibition) 0.97% Charles E. Devlin (Socialist) 0.87% Robert W. Stevens (Labor) 0.35%
Massachusetts	David I. Walsh	Democratic	Defeated, 45.71%	Samuel W. McCall (Republican) 46.97% William Shaw (Prohibition) 3.90% Walter S. Hutchins (Socialist) 1.74% Nelson B. Clark (Progressive) 1.39% Peter O'Rourke (Socialist Labor) 0.29%
Mississippi	Earl L. Brewer	Democratic	Term-limited, Democratic victory	Theodore G. Bilbo (Democratic) 92.59% J. T. Lester (Socialist) 7.41% (Democratic primary results); Theodore G. Bilbo 50.36% M. W. Reily 32.23% John R. Tally 7.73% H. M. Quinn 5.15% Peter Simpson Stovall 4.53%
