= 1916 Ohio gubernatorial election =

- November 7, 1916

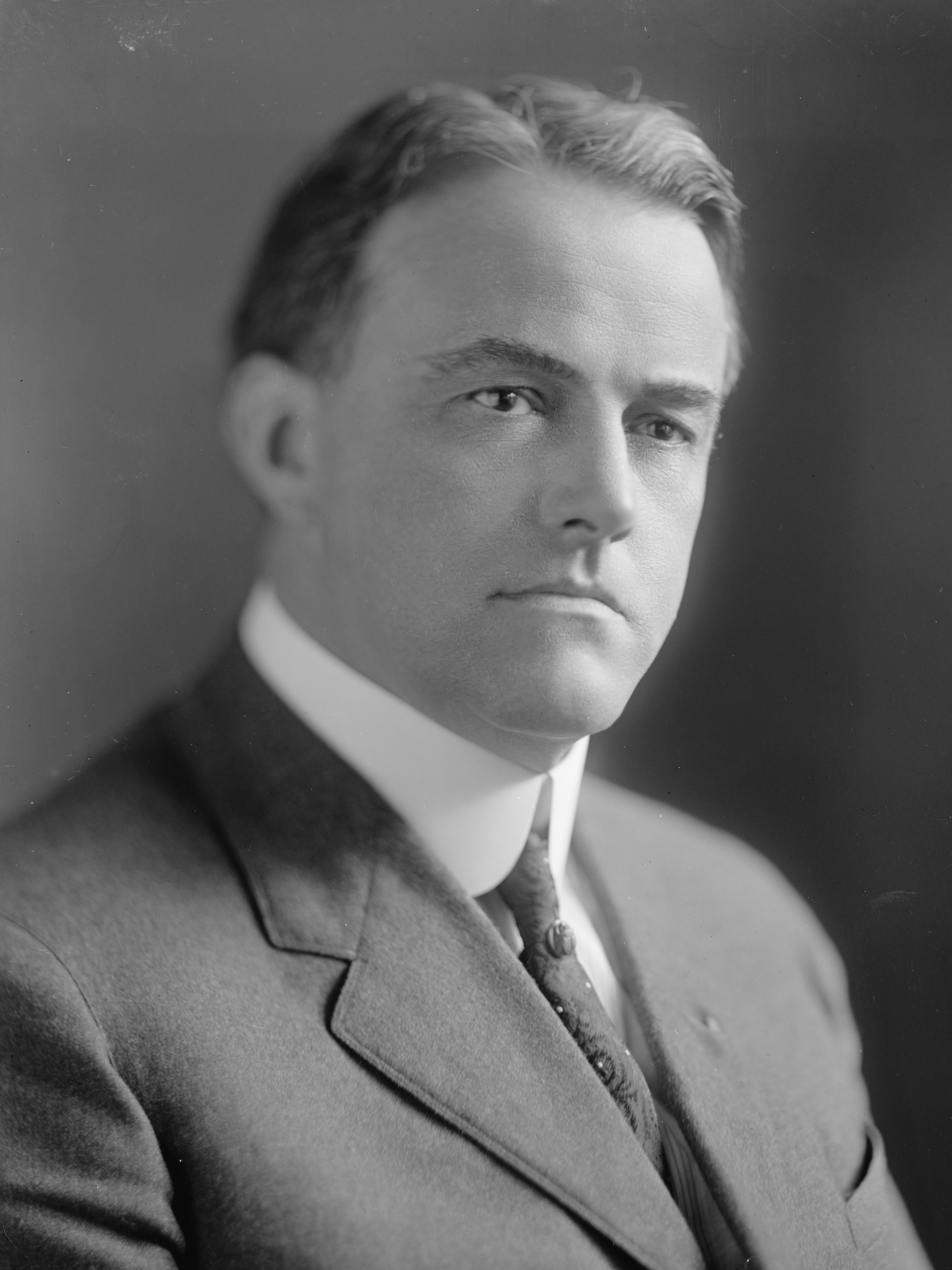
Nominee	James M. Cox	Frank B. Willis
Party	Democratic	Republican
Popular vote	568,218	561,602
Percentage	48.40%	47.83%
- County results Cox: 40–50% 50–60% 60–70% Willis: 40–50% 50–60% 60–70%
Governor before election
Frank B. Willis
Republican
Elected Governor
James M. Cox
Democratic

The 1916 Ohio gubernatorial election was held on November 7, 1916. Democratic nominee James M. Cox defeated incumbent Republican Frank B. Willis in a rematch of the 1914 election with 48.40% of the vote.

== General election ==
=== Candidates ===
- Tom Clifford (Socialist)
- James M. Cox, former Governor (1913–15) and U.S. Representative from Dayton (Democratic)
- John H. Dickason (Prohibition)
- Frank B. Willis, incumbent Governor since 1915 (Republican)

=== Results ===
1916 Ohio gubernatorial election
Party	Candidate	Votes	%	±%
Democratic	James M. Cox	568,218	48.40%	
Republican	Frank B. Willis (incumbent)	561,602	47.83%	
Socialist	Tom Clifford	36,908	3.14%	
Prohibition	John H. Dickason	7,347	0.63%	
Majority		6,616		
Turnout				
Democratic gain from Republican		Swing		
