= 1933 Boston mayoral election =

Election in Massachusetts, United States

- November 7, 1933
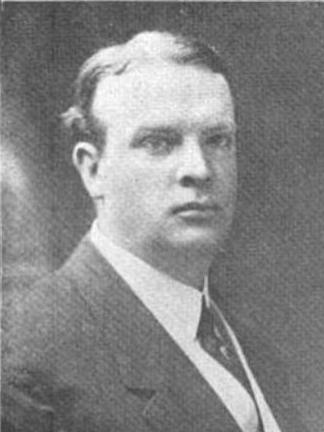

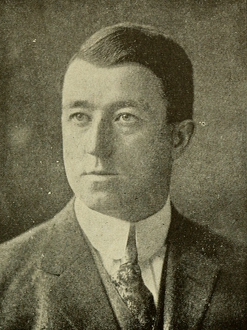

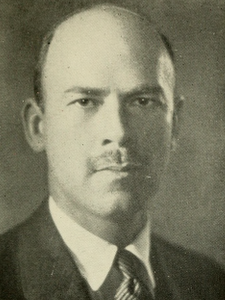
Candidate	Frederick Mansfield	Malcolm Nichols
Party	Nonpartisan	Nonpartisan
Popular vote	70,035	68,321
Percentage	28.31%	27.62%
Candidate	William J. Foley	Henry Parkman Jr.
Party	Nonpartisan	Nonpartisan
Popular vote	60,776	28,184
Percentage	24.57%	11.73%
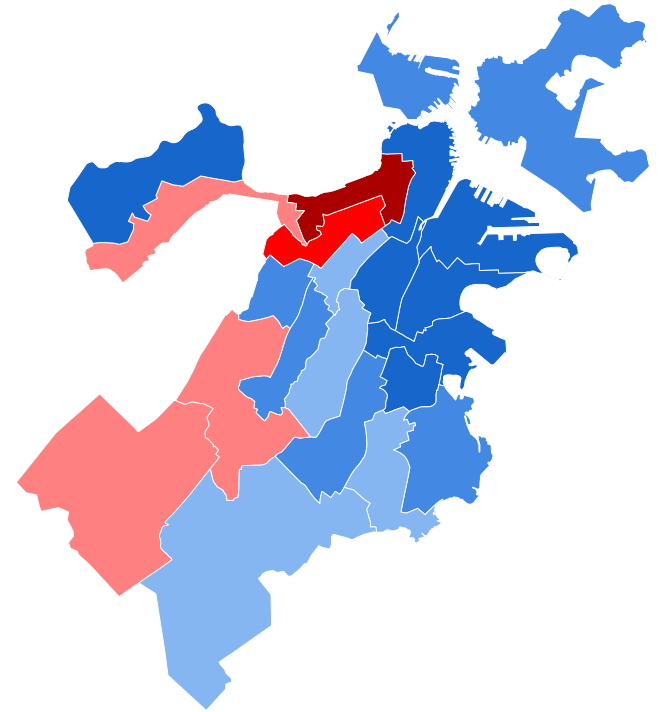
- Results by ward Democrats (Mansfield, Foley, And O'Connell): 50–60% 60–70% 70–80%+ Republicans (Nichols And Parkman Jr.: 50–60% 60–70% 70–80%+
Mayor before election
James Michael Curley
Elected mayor
Frederick Mansfield

The Boston mayoral election of 1933 occurred on Tuesday, November 7, 1933. Former state treasurer Frederick Mansfield defeated five other candidates to be elected Mayor of Boston.

In 1918, the Massachusetts state legislature had passed legislation making the Mayor of Boston ineligible to serve consecutive terms. Thus, incumbent James Michael Curley was unable to run for re-election.

Mansfield was inaugurated on Monday, January 1, 1934.

== Candidates ==
- William J. Foley, District Attorney of Suffolk County since 1927
- Frederick Mansfield, Treasurer and Receiver-General of Massachusetts from 1914 to 1915
- Malcolm Nichols, Mayor of Boston from 1926 to 1930
- Joseph F. O'Connell, member of the United States House of Representatives from 1907 to 1911
- Henry Parkman Jr., member of the Massachusetts Senate since 1929, member of the Boston City Council from 1925 to 1929
- Michael H. Sullivan, municipal court judge and former chairman of the Boston Finance Commission

== Results ==
Candidates	General Election	
Candidates	Votes	%
Frederick Mansfield	70,035	28.31
Malcolm Nichols	68,321	27.62
William J. Foley	60,776	24.57
Henry Parkman Jr.	28,184	11.73
Joseph F. O'Connell	9,961	4.03
Michael H. Sullivan	9,127	3.69
All others	132	0.53

== See also ==
- List of mayors of Boston, Massachusetts
