= Albert Henry Vestal =

American politician (1875–1932)

Albert Vestal
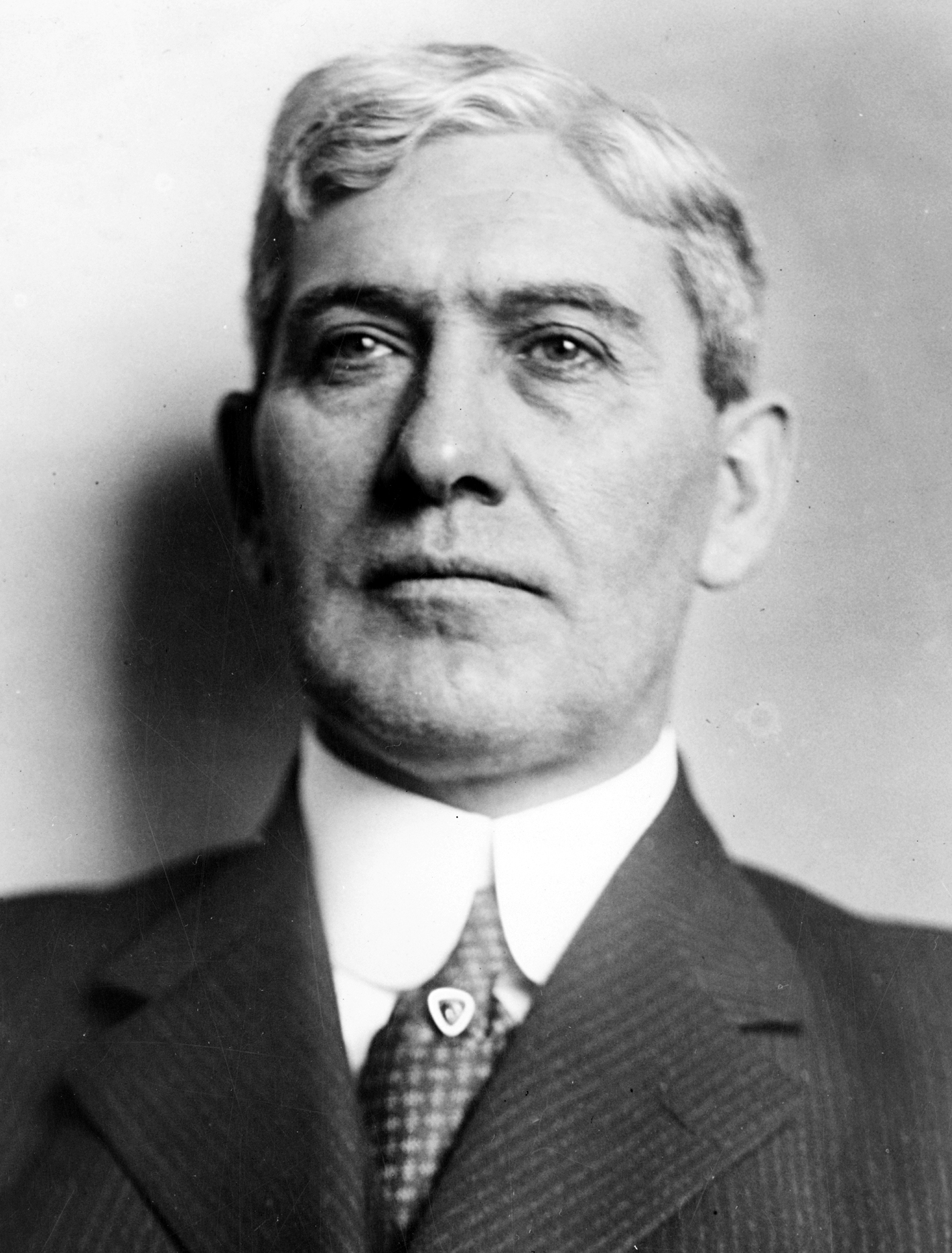

Member of the U.S. House of Representatives from Indiana's 8th district
- In office March 4, 1917 – April 1, 1932
- Preceded by: John A. M. Adair
- Succeeded by: vacant

Personal details
- Born: January 18, 1875 Indiana, U.S.
- Died: April 1, 1932 (aged 57) Washington, D.C., U.S
- Party: Republican
- Education: Indiana State Normal School; Valparaiso University

Albert Henry Vestal (January 18, 1875 – April 1, 1932) was an American lawyer and politician who served eight terms as a Republican United States representative from Indiana from 1917 to 1932.

== Biography ==
Born on a farm near Frankton, in Madison County, Indiana, on January 18, 1875, he attended common schools, worked in steel mills and factories and attended the Indiana State Normal School, now Indiana State University, at Terre Haute. He taught school for several years and then graduated from the law department of the Valparaiso University in 1896. Admitted to the bar in 1896, Vestal commenced practicing law in Anderson, Indiana.

=== Early career ===
He was elected prosecuting attorney of the fiftieth judicial circuit and served from 1900 to 1906. He was an unsuccessful candidate for the Republican nomination for Congress in 1908 and an unsuccessful candidate for election in 1914 to the Sixty-fourth Congress.

=== Congress ===
He was finally elected as a Republican to the Sixty-fifth Congress and to seven succeeding Congresses, serving from March 4, 1917, until his death. He was chairman of the committee on Coinage, Weights, and Measures (Sixty-sixth through Sixty-eighth Congresses), Committee on Patents (Sixty-ninth through Seventy-first Congresses); majority whip (Sixty-eighth through Seventy-first Congresses).

=== Death ===
Vestal died in Washington, D.C., on April 1, 1932, and was interred in East Maplewood Cemetery in Anderson.

== See also ==
- List of members of the United States Congress who died in office (1900–1949)

U.S. House of Representatives
Preceded by John A. M. Adair	Member of the U.S. House of Representatives from Indiana's 8th congressional district 1917–1932	Succeeded by John W. Boehne, Jr.
Party political offices
Preceded by Harold Knutson (R-MN)	House Majority Whip; 1923–1931	Succeeded by John McDuffie (D-AL)
Preceded by Harold Knutson (MN)	House Republican Whip; 1923–1931	Succeeded by Carl G. Bachmann (WV)
