= List of elections in 1915 =

The following elections occurred in the year 1915.

- 1915 Chilean parliamentary election
- 1915 Chilean presidential election
- 1915 Costa Rican parliamentary election
- 1915 Danish Folketing election
- December 1915 Greek legislative election
- May 1915 Greek legislative election
- 1915 Honduran general election
- 1915 Hong Kong sanitary board election
- 1915 Liberian general election
- 1915 Norwegian parliamentary election
- 1915 Peruvian presidential election
- 1915 Salvadoran presidential election
- 1915 South African general election

== Africa ==
- 1915 Liberian general election
- 1915 South African general election

== Europe ==
- 1915 Liechtenstein local elections
- May 1915 Portuguese presidential election
- August 1915 Portuguese presidential election
- 1915 Portuguese legislative election
- 1915 Luxembourg general election
- 1915 San Marino general election

=== United Kingdom ===
- 1915 Appleby by-election
- 1915 Arfon by-election
- 1915 Cardiff by-election
- 1915 Carmarthen Boroughs by-election
- 1915 Central Hackney by-election
- 1915 Chesterton by-election
- 1915 College Green by-election
- 1915 Dublin Harbour by-election
- 1915 East Antrim by-election
- 1915 Hayes by-election
- 1915 Heywood by-election
- 1915 Horncastle by-election
- 1915 Howdenshire by-election
- 1915 Keighley by-election
- 1915 Kingston by-election
- 1915 Liverpool Kirkdale by-election
- 1915 Maidstone by-election
- 1915 Mid Antrim by-election
- 1915 North Norfolk by-election
- 1915 North West Staffordshire by-election
- 1915 Prestwich by-election
- 1915 Saffron Walden by-election
- 1915 St Helens by-election
- 1915 Shipley by-election
- 1915 South Antrim by-election
- 1915 Swansea District by-election
- 1915 Thirsk and Malton by-election
- 1915 Tullamore by-election
- 1915 Uxbridge by-election
- 1915 West Staffordshire by-election
- 1915 Wigtownshire by-election

== North America ==
=== Canada ===
- 1915 Alberta liquor plebiscite
- 1915 Edmonton municipal election
- 1915 Manitoba general election
- 1915 Prince Edward Island general election
- 1915 Toronto municipal election
- 1915 Yukon general election

=== United States ===
- House of Representatives
  - 1915 New York's 23rd congressional district special election
  - 1915 New York's 31st congressional district special election
  - 1915 New York's 36th congressional district special election
  - 1915 Pennsylvania's 24th congressional district special election
  - 1915 South Carolina's 4th congressional district special election
- Governors
  - 1915 Kentucky gubernatorial election
  - 1915 Maryland gubernatorial election
  - 1915 Massachusetts gubernatorial election
  - 1915 Mississippi gubernatorial election
- Mayors
  - 1915 Baltimore mayoral election
  - 1915 Chicago mayoral election
  - 1915 Los Angeles mayoral election
  - 1915 Manchester, New Hampshire, mayoral election
  - 1915 Philadelphia mayoral election
  - 1915 San Diego mayoral election

== Oceania ==
=== Australia ===
- 1915 Queensland state election
- 1915 South Australian state election
- 1915 Armidale state by-election
- 1915 Bendigo by-election
- 1915 Castlereagh state by-election
- 1915 Clarence state by-election
- 1915 Dalley by-election
- 1915 Grampians by-election
- 1915 Wide Bay by-election
- 1915 Willoughby state by-election
- 1915 Wollondilly state by-election

=== New Zealand ===
- 1915 Bay of Islands by-election
- 1915 Dunedin Central by-election
- 1915 Taumarunui by-election

== See also ==
- Category:1915 elections
