= 1918 Georgia gubernatorial election =

- November 5, 1918
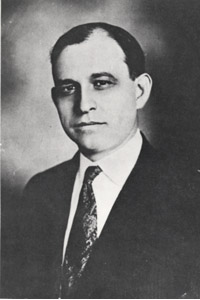
Nominee	Hugh Dorsey
Party	Democratic
Popular vote	70,621
Percentage	100.00%
Governor before election
Hugh Dorsey
Democratic
Elected Governor
Hugh Dorsey
Democratic

The 1918 Georgia gubernatorial election was held on November 5, 1918, in order to elect the Governor of Georgia. Incumbent Democratic Governor Hugh Dorsey ran unopposed in both the primary and general election and subsequently won re-election.

== General election ==
On election day, November 5, 1918, incumbent Democratic Governor Hugh Dorsey ran unopposed and won the election with 70,621 votes, thereby holding Democratic control over the office of Governor. Dorsey was sworn in for his second term on June 25, 1919.

=== Results ===
Georgia gubernatorial election, 1918
Party	Candidate	Votes	%
Democratic	Hugh Dorsey (incumbent)	70,621	100.00
Total votes		141,681	100.00
Democratic hold			
