= 1918 Kansas gubernatorial election =

- November 5, 1918
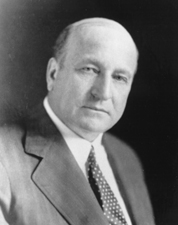

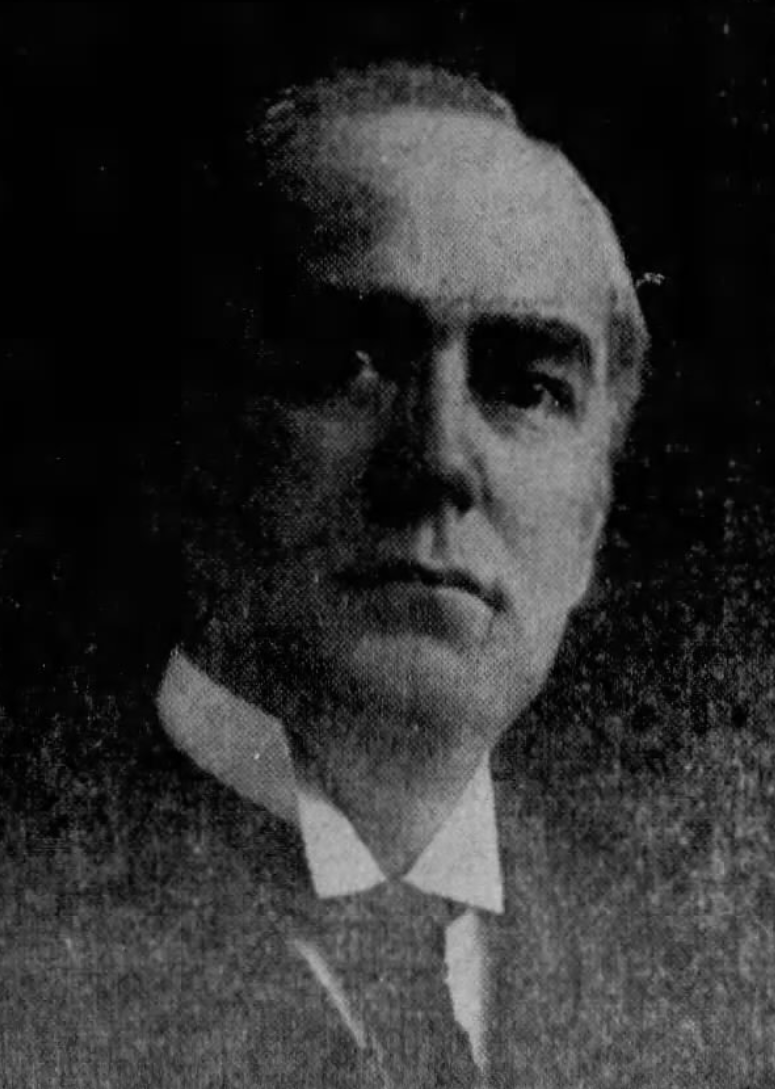
| Nominee | Henry Justin Allen | W. C. Lansdon |
| Party | Republican | Democratic |
| Popular vote | 287,957 | 133,054 |
| Percentage | 66.39% | 30.68% |
- County results Allen: 40–50% 50–60% 60–70% 70–80%
Governor before election
Arthur Capper
Republican
Elected Governor
Henry Justin Allen
Republican

The 1918 Kansas gubernatorial election was held on November 5, 1918. Republican nominee Henry Justin Allen defeated Democratic nominee W. C. Lansdon with 66.39% of the vote.

== General election ==
=== Candidates ===
Major party candidates

- Henry Justin Allen, Republican
- W. C. Lansdon, Democratic

Other candidates

- George W. Kleihege, Socialist

=== Results ===
1918 Kansas gubernatorial election
| Party | Candidate | Votes | % | ±% |
|---|---|---|---|---|
| Republican | Henry Justin Allen | 287,957 | 66.39% | |
| Democratic | W. C. Lansdon | 133,054 | 30.68% | |
| Socialist | George W. Kleihege | 12,732 | 2.94% | |
| Majority | | 154,903 | | |
| Turnout | | | | |
| Republican hold | | Swing | | |
