= John A. M. Adair =

American politician

John Alfred McDowell Adair
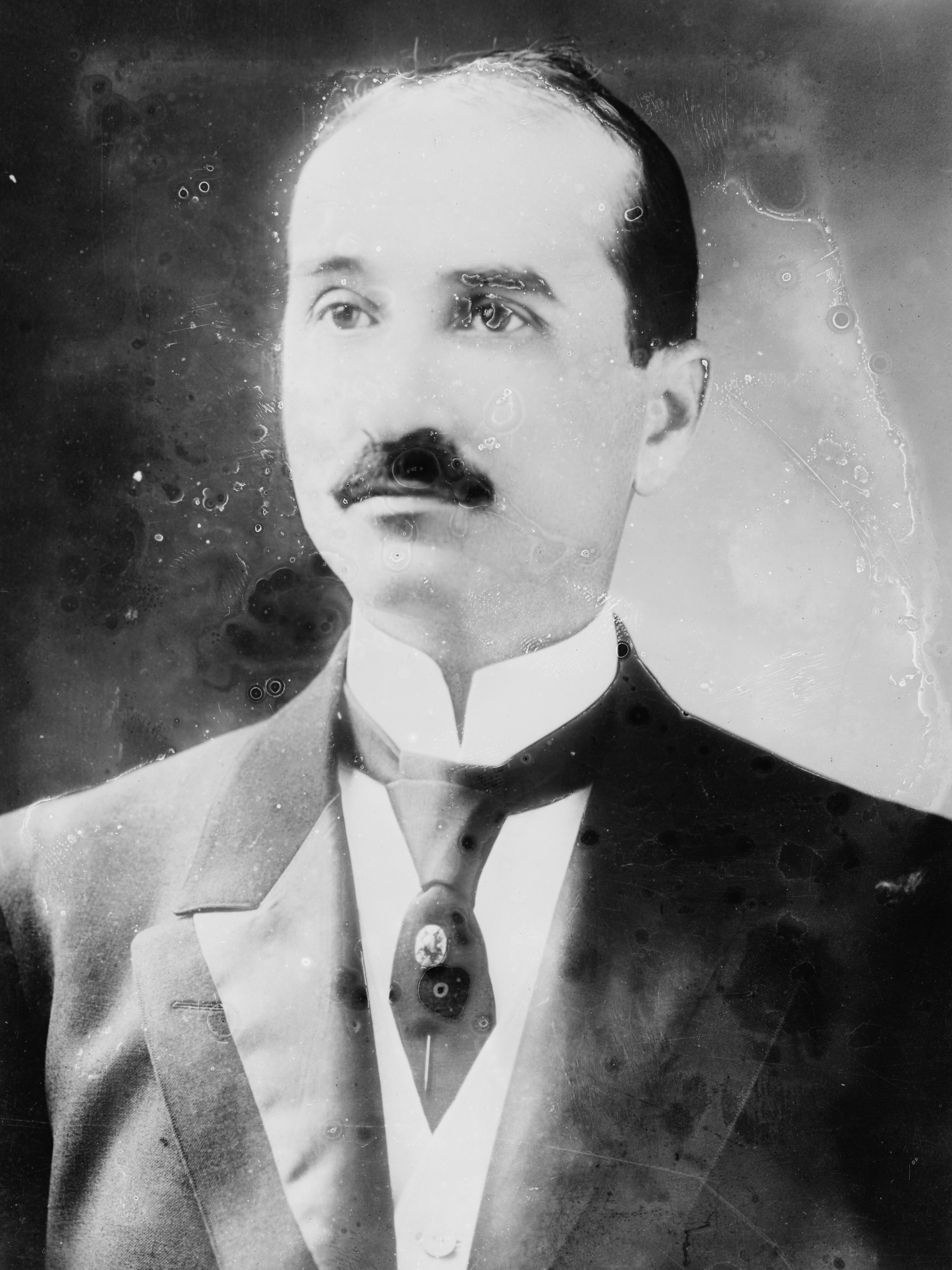

Member of the U.S. House of Representatives from Indiana's 8th district
- In office March 4, 1907 – March 3, 1917
- Preceded by: George W. Cromer
- Succeeded by: Albert H. Vestal

Member of the Indiana House of Representatives
- In office 1902–1903

Personal details
- Born: December 22, 1864 Portland, Indiana, US
- Died: October 5, 1938 (aged 73) Portland, Indiana, US
- Party: Democratic

John Alfred McDowell Adair (December 22, 1864 – October 5, 1938) was an American lawyer and politician who served five terms as a U.S. representative from Indiana from 1907 to 1917.

== Biography ==
Born in Portland, Indiana, Adair attended the public schools and Portland High School where he engaged in mercantile pursuits and served as clerk of the city of Portland 1888–1890. He also served as clerk of Jay County 1890-1895 where he studied law. Adair was admitted to the bar in 1895 and commenced practice in Portland, Indiana. He served as member of the State house of representatives in 1902 and 1903. During this time, he engaged in banking, being elected president of the First National Bank of Portland in 1904.

=== Congress ===
Adair was elected as a Democrat to the Sixtieth and to the four succeeding Congresses (March 4, 1907 – March 3, 1917). He served as chairman of the Committee on Expenditures in the Department of War (Sixty-third and Sixty-fourth Congresses). However, he did not seek renomination in 1916, but was an unsuccessful Democratic nominee for Governor of Indiana.

=== Later career and death ===
Afterward, he resumed the banking business in Portland, Indiana. Later, he moved to Washington, D.C., in 1924 and served as vice president of Southern Dairies (Inc.) until 1931. He also served as chairman of the board of the Finance Service Co., in Baltimore, Maryland from 1933 to 1935, and served as vice president of the Atlas Tack Corporation in Fairhaven, Massachusetts from 1935 to 1937. Adair also served as director of the Artloom Corporation, Philadelphia, Pennsylvania, in 1937.

He died in Portland, Indiana, October 5, 1938.

Party political offices
Preceded by Samuel M. Ralston	Democratic nominee for Governor of Indiana; 1916	Succeeded by Carleton B. McCulloch
U.S. House of Representatives
Preceded by George W. Cromer	Member of the U.S. House of Representatives from Indiana's 8th congressional district 1907–1917	Succeeded by Albert H. Vestal
