= 1916 Indiana gubernatorial election =

- November 7, 1916
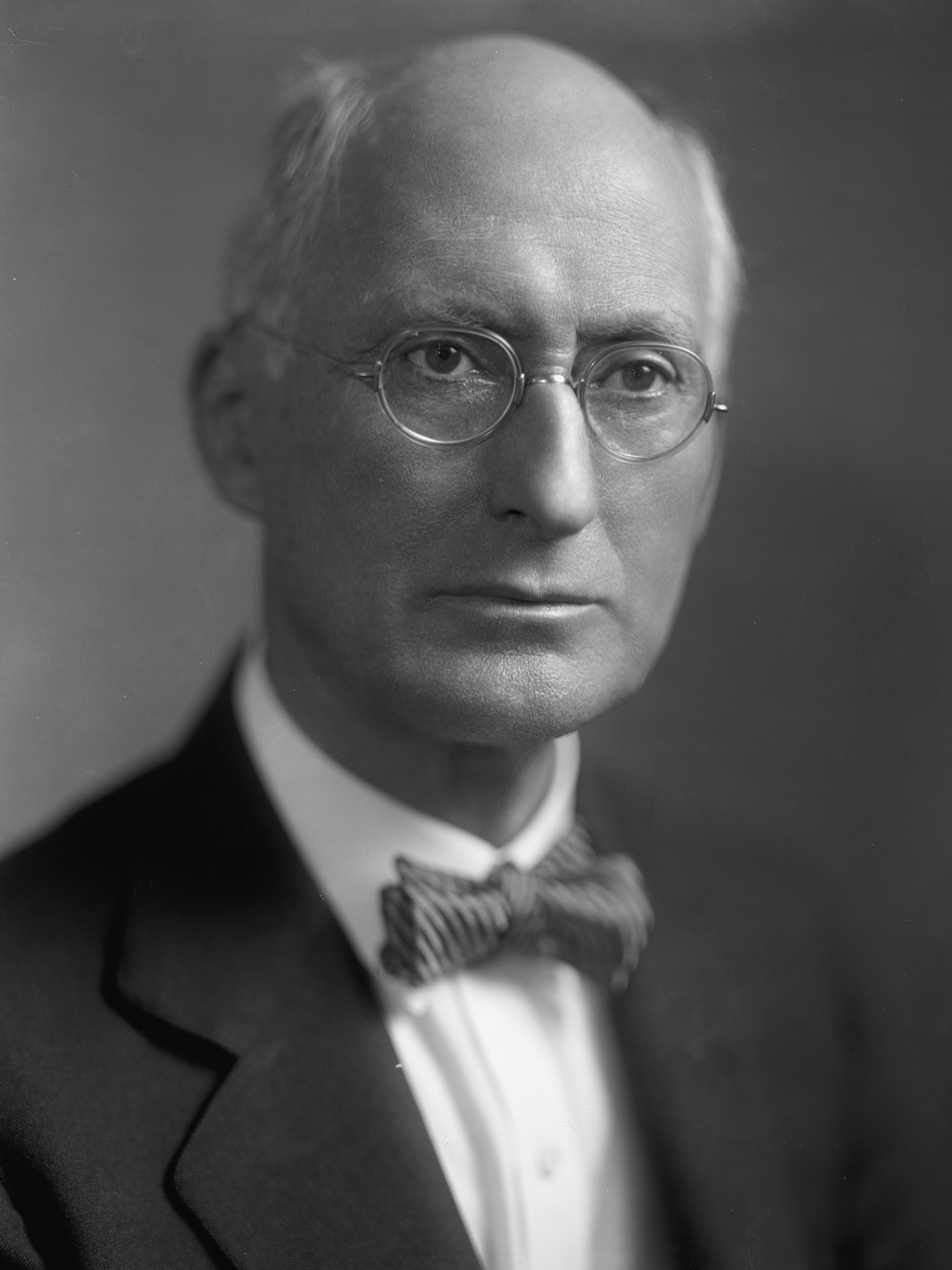

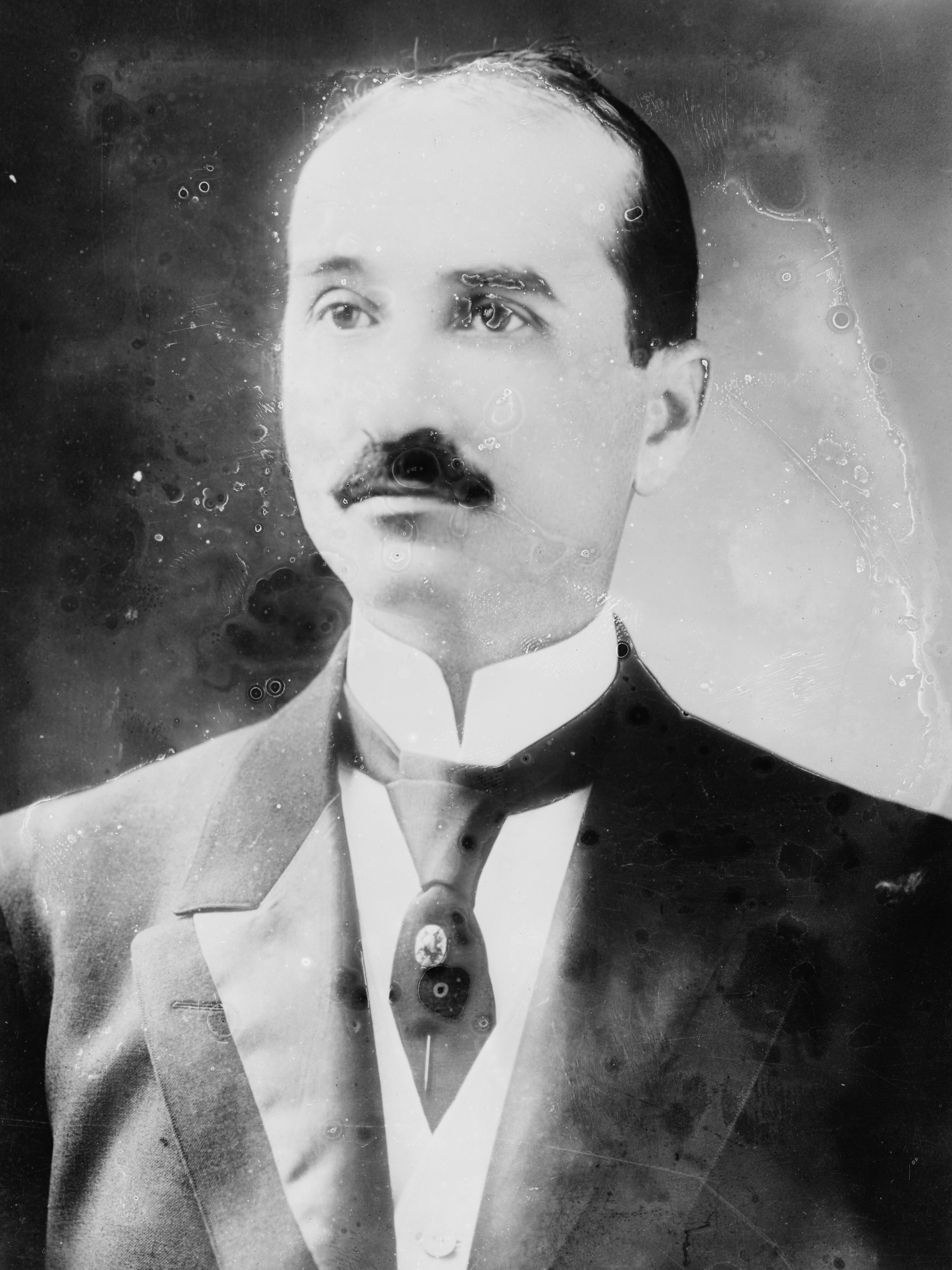
Nominee	James P. Goodrich	John A. M. Adair
Party	Republican	Democratic
Popular vote	337,831	325,060
Percentage	47.80%	46.00%
- County results Goodrich: 40–50% 50–60% 60–70% Adair: 40–50% 50–60% 60–70%
Governor before election
Samuel M. Ralston
Democratic
Elected Governor
James P. Goodrich
Republican

The 1916 Indiana gubernatorial election was held on November 7, 1916. Republican nominee James P. Goodrich narrowly defeated Democratic nominee John A. M. Adair with 47.80% of the vote.

== General election ==
=== Candidates ===
Major party candidates

- James P. Goodrich, Republican, member of the Republican National Committee
- John A. M. Adair, Democratic, U.S. Representative from Indiana's 8th congressional district

Other candidates

- William W. Farmer, Socialist
- Alfred L. Mondy, Prohibition
- Thomas A. Dailey, Progressive
- Joe B. Trunko, Socialist Labor

=== Results ===
1916 Indiana gubernatorial election
Party	Candidate	Votes	%	±%
Republican	James P. Goodrich	337,831	47.80%	
Democratic	John A. M. Adair	325,060	46.00%	
Socialist	William W. Farmer	22,157	3.14%	
Prohibition	Alfred L. Mondy	15,454	2.19%	
Progressive	Thomas A. Dailey	4,573	0.65%	
Socialist Labor	Joe B. Trunko	1,553	0.22%	
Majority		12,771		
Turnout				
Republican gain from Democratic		Swing		
