= 1916 Kansas gubernatorial election =

- November 7, 1916
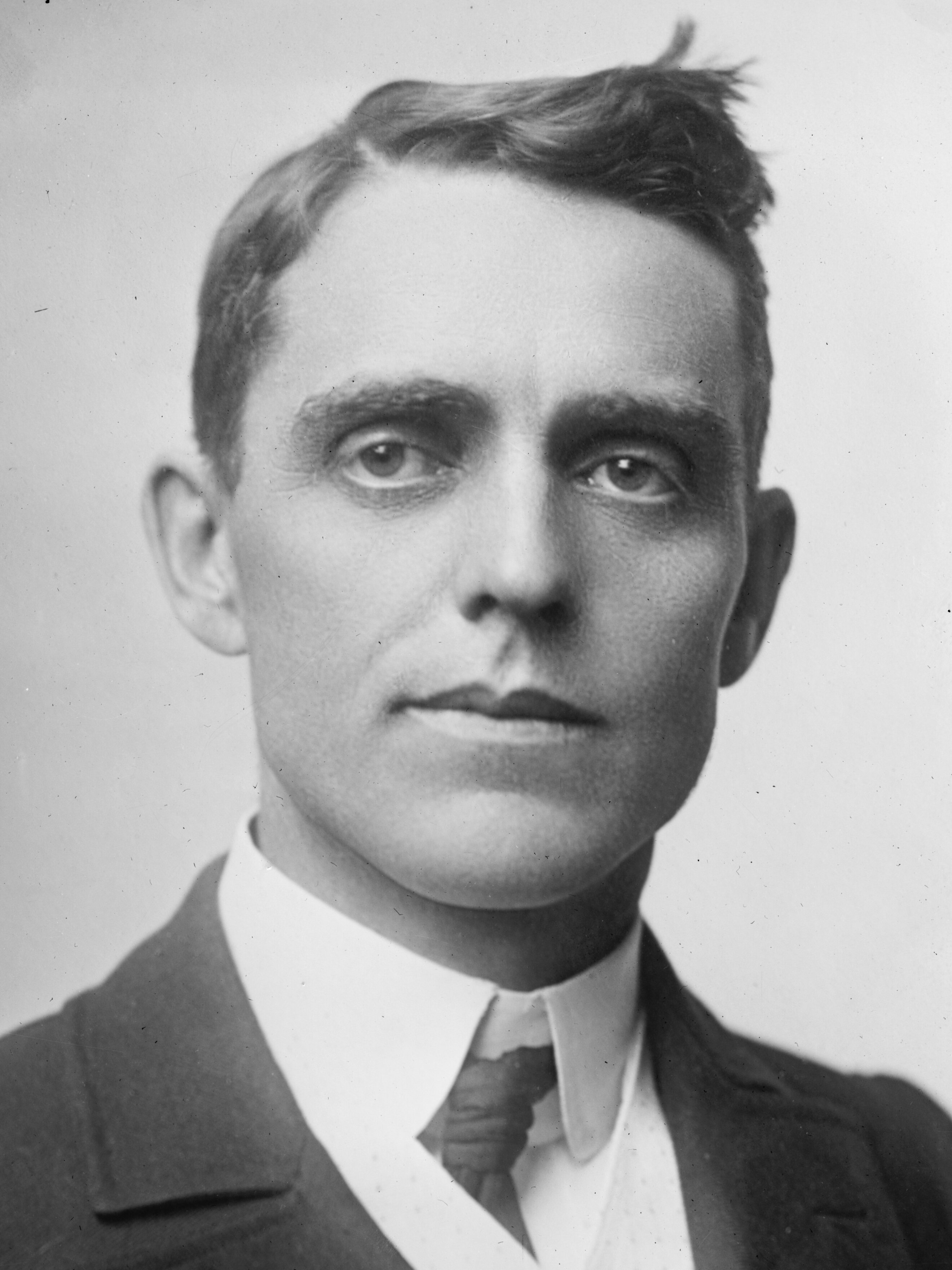

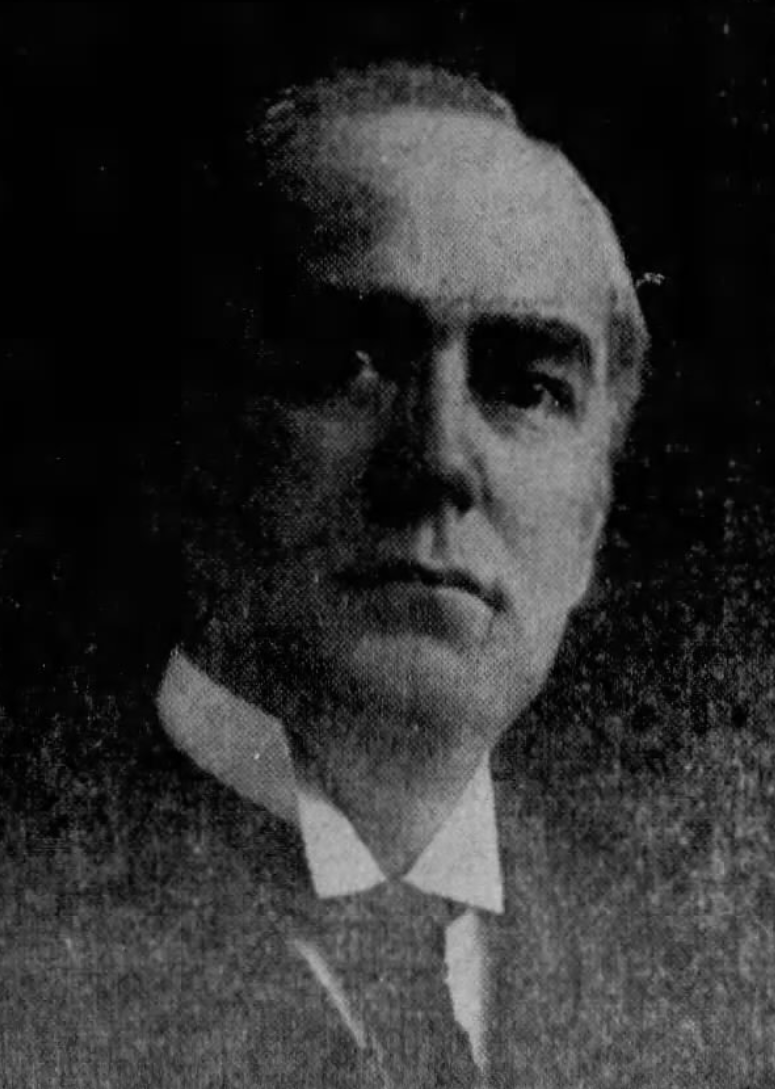
Nominee	Arthur Capper	W. C. Lansdon
Party	Republican	Democratic
Popular vote	353,169	192,037
Percentage	60.77%	33.05%
- County results Capper: 40–50% 50–60% 60–70% 70–80% Lansdon: 40–50% 50–60%
Governor before election
Arthur Capper
Republican
Elected Governor
Arthur Capper
Republican

The 1916 Kansas gubernatorial election was held on November 7, 1916. Incumbent Republican Arthur Capper defeated Democratic nominee W. C. Lansdon with 60.77% of the vote.

== General election ==
=== Candidates ===
Major party candidates

- Arthur Capper, Republican
- W. C. Lansdon, Democratic

Other candidates

- E. N. Richardson, Socialist
- Harry R. Ross, Prohibition

=== Results ===
1916 Kansas gubernatorial election
Party	Candidate	Votes	%	±%
Republican	Arthur Capper (incumbent)	353,169	60.77%	
Democratic	W. C. Lansdon	192,037	33.05%	
Socialist	E. N. Richardson	22,552	3.88%	
Prohibition	Harry R. Ross	13,366	2.30%	
Majority		161,132		
Turnout				
Republican hold		Swing		
