= 1916 Massachusetts gubernatorial election =

- November 7, 1916
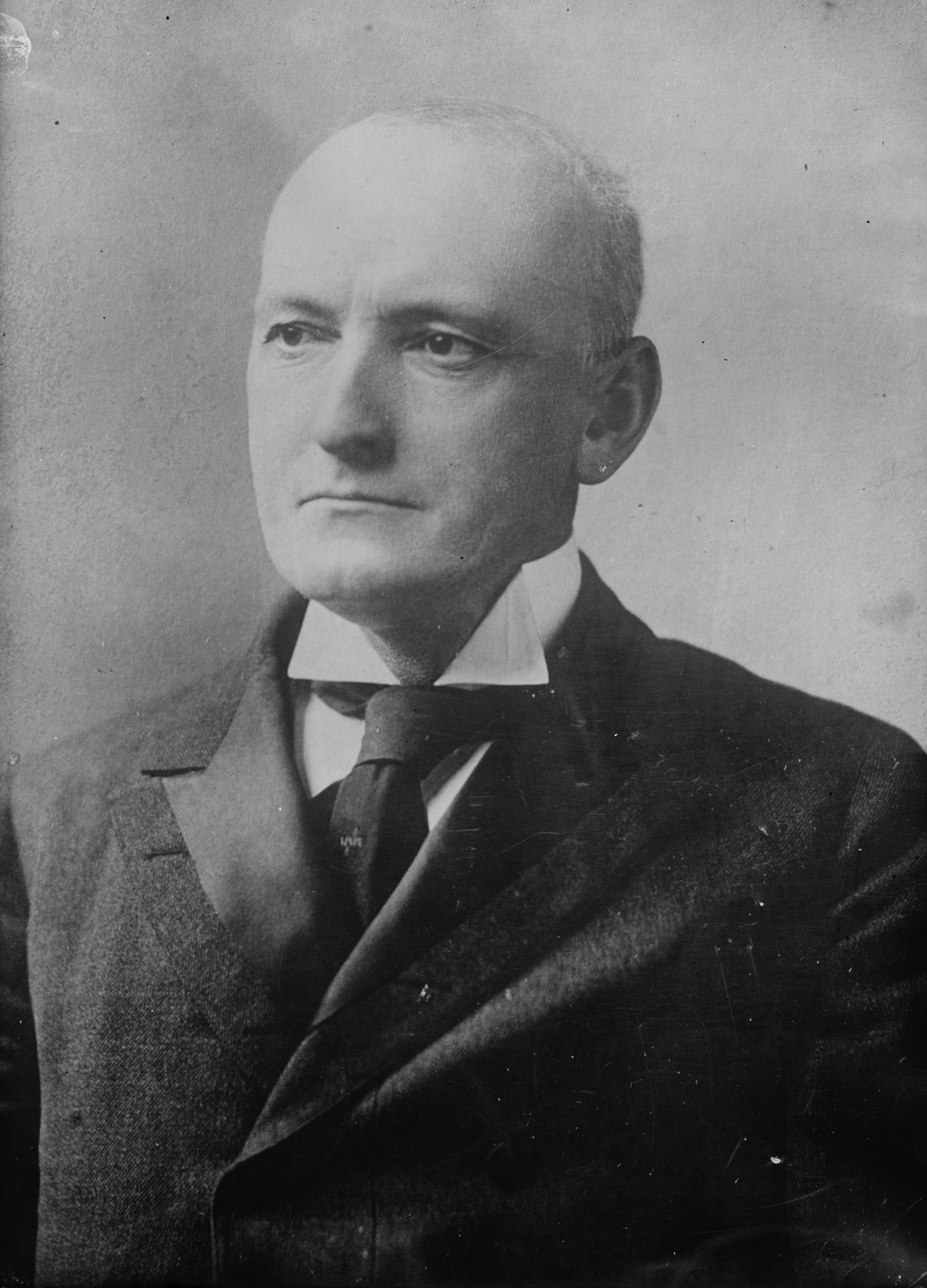

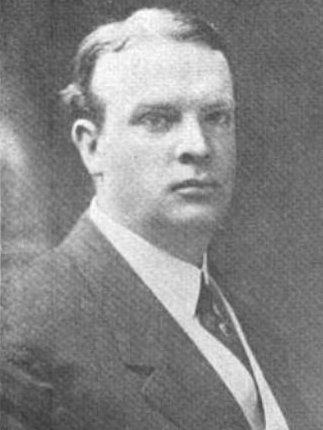
Nominee	Samuel W. McCall	Frederick Mansfield
Party	Republican	Democratic
Popular vote	276,123	229,883
Percentage	52.45%	43.67%
- McCall: 40-50% 50–60% 60–70% 70–80% 80–90% >90% Mansfield: 40-50% 50–60% 60–70%
Governor before election
Samuel W. McCall
Republican
Elected Governor
Samuel W. McCall
Republican

The 1916 Massachusetts gubernatorial election was held on November 7, 1916.

== Republican primary ==
=== Governor ===
==== Candidates ====
- Samuel W. McCall, incumbent governor

==== Results ====
1916 Republican gubernatorial primary
Party	Candidate	Votes	%
Republican	Samuel W. McCall (incumbent)	115,242	100.00%
Write-in	All others	2	0.00%
Total votes		115,244	100.00%

=== Lieutenant governor ===
==== Candidates ====
- Calvin Coolidge, incumbent lieutenant governor

==== Results ====
Lieutenant Governor Coolidge was unopposed for the Republican nomination.

1916 Republican lieutenant gubernatorial primary
Party	Candidate	Votes	%
Republican	Calvin Coolidge (incumbent)	109,648	100.00%
Write-in	All others	2	0.00%
Total votes		109,650	100.00%

== Democratic primary ==
=== Governor ===
==== Candidates ====
- Charles H. Cole, adjutant general of Massachusetts and former Boston Police and Fire commissioner
- Frederick Mansfield, former treasurer and receiver-general of Massachusetts

==== Results ====
1916 Democratic gubernatorial primary
Party	Candidate	Votes	%
Democratic	Frederick Mansfield	45,415	56.03%
Democratic	Charles H. Cole	35,637	43.97%
Write-in	All others	0	0.00%
Total votes		81,052	100.00%

=== Lieutenant governor ===
==== Candidates ====
- Thomas P. Riley, former chairman of the State Democratic Committee and president of the Boston United Irish League of America

==== Results ====
Riley was unopposed for the Democratic nomination.

1916 Democratic lieutenant gubernatorial primary
Party	Candidate	Votes	%
Democratic	Thomas P. Riley	66,178	100.00%
Write-in	All others	0	0.00%
Total votes		66,181	100.00%

== General election ==
=== Candidates ===
- James Hayes, perennial candidate from Plymouth (Socialist Labor)
- Chester R. Lawrence, perennial candidate from Boston (Prohibition)
- Frederick Mansfield, former treasurer and receiver-general of Massachusetts (Democratic)
- Samuel W. McCall, incumbent governor (Republican)
- Dan A. White, candidate for governor in 1909 and 1910 (Socialist)

=== Results ===
1916 Massachusetts gubernatorial election
Party	Candidate	Votes	%	±%
Republican	Samuel W. McCall (incumbent)	276,123	52.45%	▲5.48
Democratic	Frederick Mansfield	229,883	43.67%	▼2.04
Socialist	Dan A. White	10,582	2.01%	▲0.27
Prohibition	Chester Lawrence	5,983	1.14%	▼2.76
Socialist Labor	James Hayes	3,893	0.73%	▲0.44
Write-in	All others	2	0.00%	
Total votes		526,421	100.00%	

== See also ==
- 1916 Massachusetts legislature

== Bibliography ==
- Office of the Secretary of the Commonwealth (1916). Election Statistics, 1916. Boston, MA.
