= 1918 Ohio gubernatorial election =

- November 5, 1918

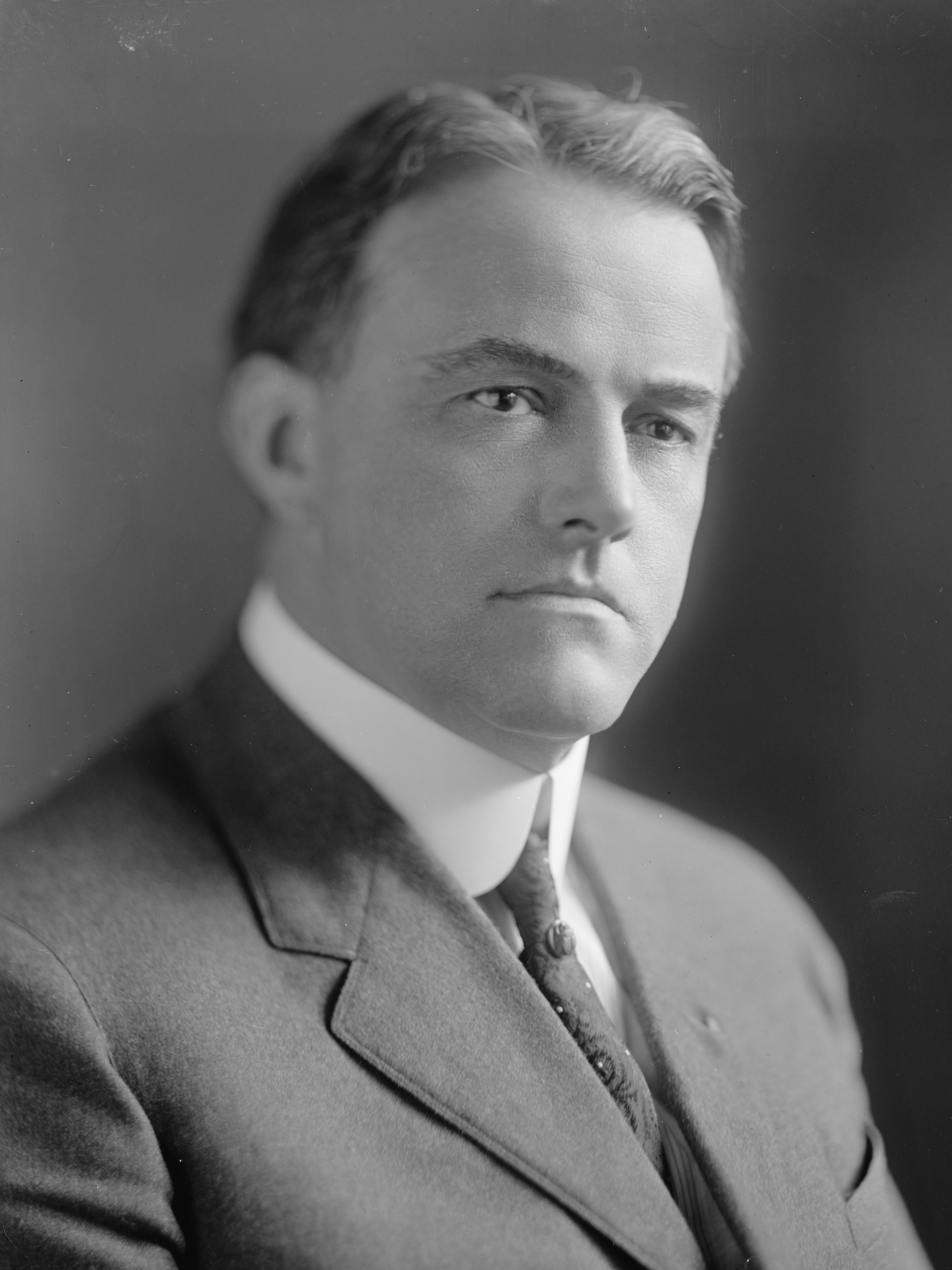
| Nominee | James M. Cox | Frank B. Willis |
| Party | Democratic | Republican |
| Popular vote | 486,403 | 474,459 |
| Percentage | 50.62% | 49.38% |
- County results Cox: 50–60% 60–70% Willis: 50–60% 60–70%
Governor before election
James M. Cox
Democratic
Elected Governor
James M. Cox
Democratic

The 1918 Ohio gubernatorial election was held on November 5, 1918. Incumbent Democrat James M. Cox defeated Republican nominee Frank B. Willis in their third consecutive contest with 50.62% of the vote.

== General election ==
=== Candidates ===
- James M. Cox, Democratic
- Frank B. Willis, Republican

=== Results ===
1918 Ohio gubernatorial election
| Party | Candidate | Votes | % | ±% |
|---|---|---|---|---|
| Democratic | James M. Cox (incumbent) | 486,403 | 50.62% | |
| Republican | Frank B. Willis | 474,459 | 49.38% | |
| Majority | | 11,944 | | |
| Turnout | | | | |
| Democratic hold | | Swing | | |
