= 1915 Baltimore mayoral election =

Baltimore mayoral election, 1915
- May 4, 1915
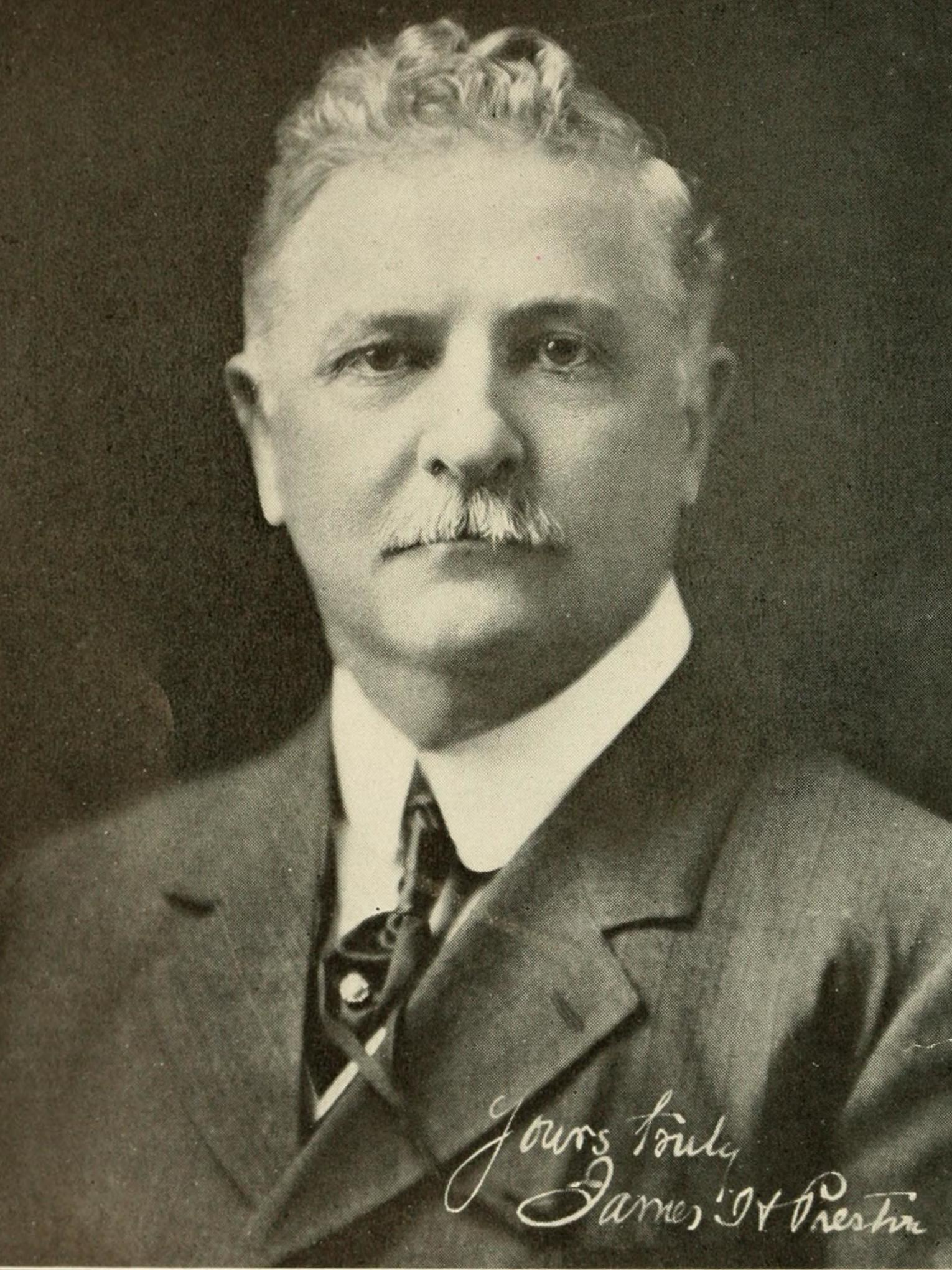

Candidate	James H. Preston	Charlie Heintzeman
Party	Democratic	Republican
Popular vote	56,415	39,358
Percentage	56.55%	39.45%
Mayor before election
James H. Preston
Democratic
Elected mayor
James H. Preston
Democratic

The 1915 Baltimore mayoral election saw the reelection of James H. Preston.

== General election ==
The general election was held May 4.

Baltimore mayoral general election, 1915
Party	Candidate	Votes	%
Democratic	James H. Preston (incumbent)	56,415	56.55%
Republican	Charlie Heintzeman	39,358	39.45%
Other	Other	3,983	3.99%
Total votes		99,756	

Other candidates included Socialist nominee C. F. Saunders and Labor nominee Robert W. Stevens.
