= W. C. Lansdon =

American judge (1863–1940)

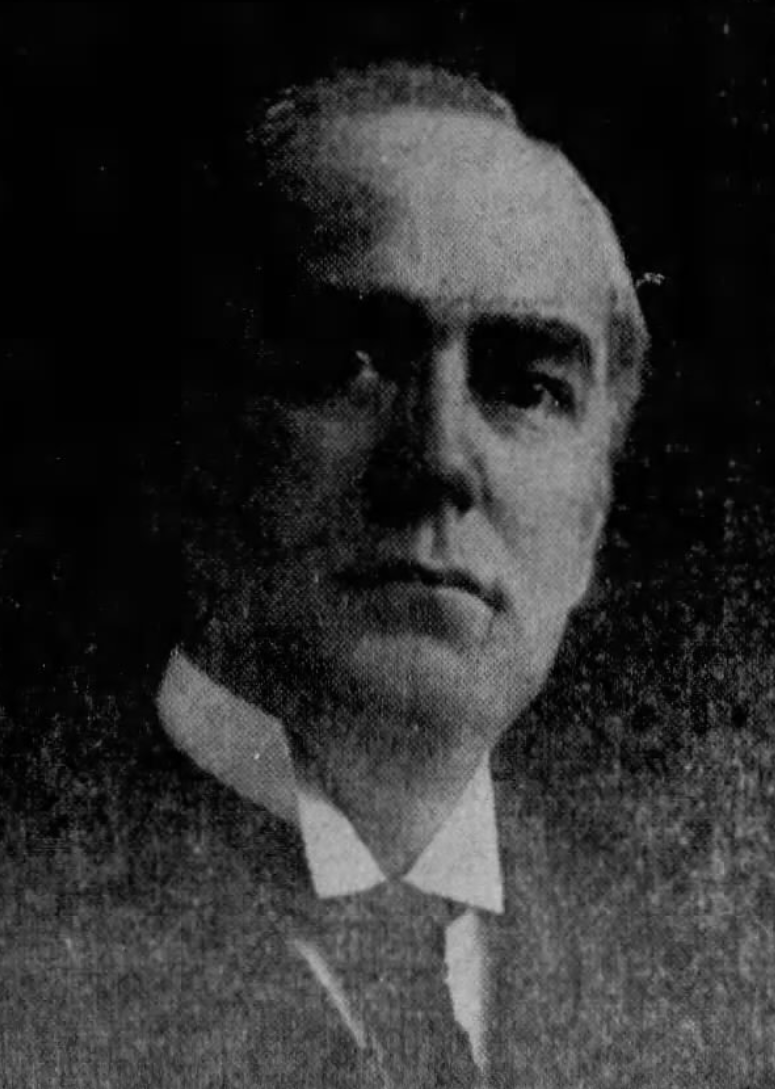
W. C. Lansdon in 1916

William Clarence Lansdon (May 6, 1863 – August 28, 1940) was a judge of the United States Board of Tax Appeals (later the United States Tax Court) from 1924 to 1934.

== Early life and career ==
Born in Linn County, Kansas, Lansdon resided in his early years in Salina, Kansas. He served as an executive officer of the Kansas State Farmers Union, of which he was the vice president from 1921 to 1925. He also worked as a newspaperman and as a member of the faculty of the University of Kansas.

== Political career ==
Landson was the Democratic Party nominee for Governor of Kansas in the 1916 Kansas gubernatorial election, losing to incumbent Arthur Capper by nearly a two-thirds margin. Lansdon fared no better running against Henry Justin Allen in the 1918 Kansas gubernatorial election.

== Judicial career ==
Republican senator Charles Curtis championed Lansdon's appointment to the Board of Tax Appeals. He was one of the original twelve members appointed to the board, and one of a group of seven appointed "from the public" rather than from positions in the federal government.

== Later life and death ==
After retiring from the Board of Tax Appeals, Lansdon moved to a farm in Laytonville, Arkansas. He lived there for approximately five years before dying on August 28, 1940, at the age of 77.
