= 1917 Virginia gubernatorial election =

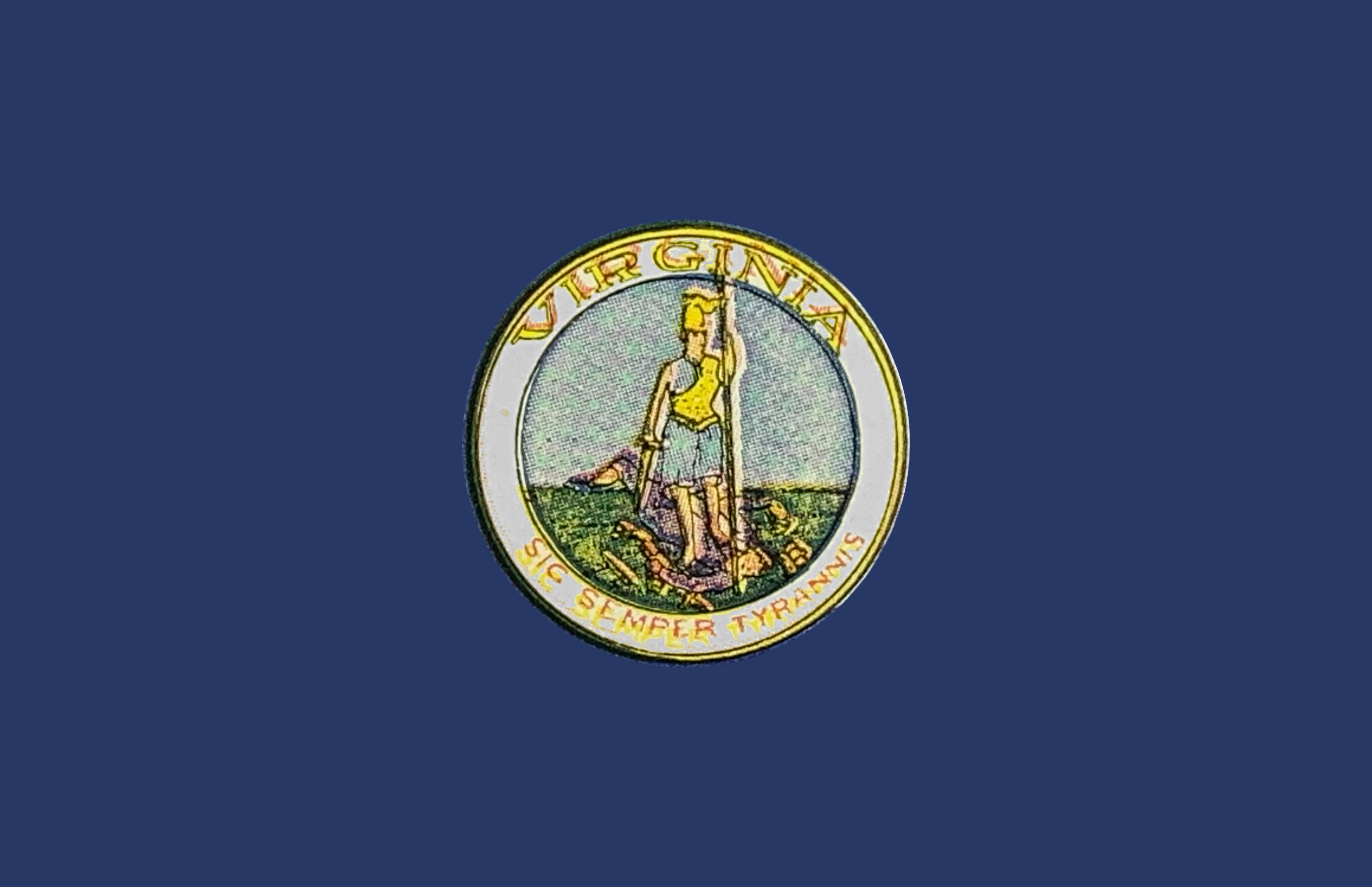
- November 6, 1917
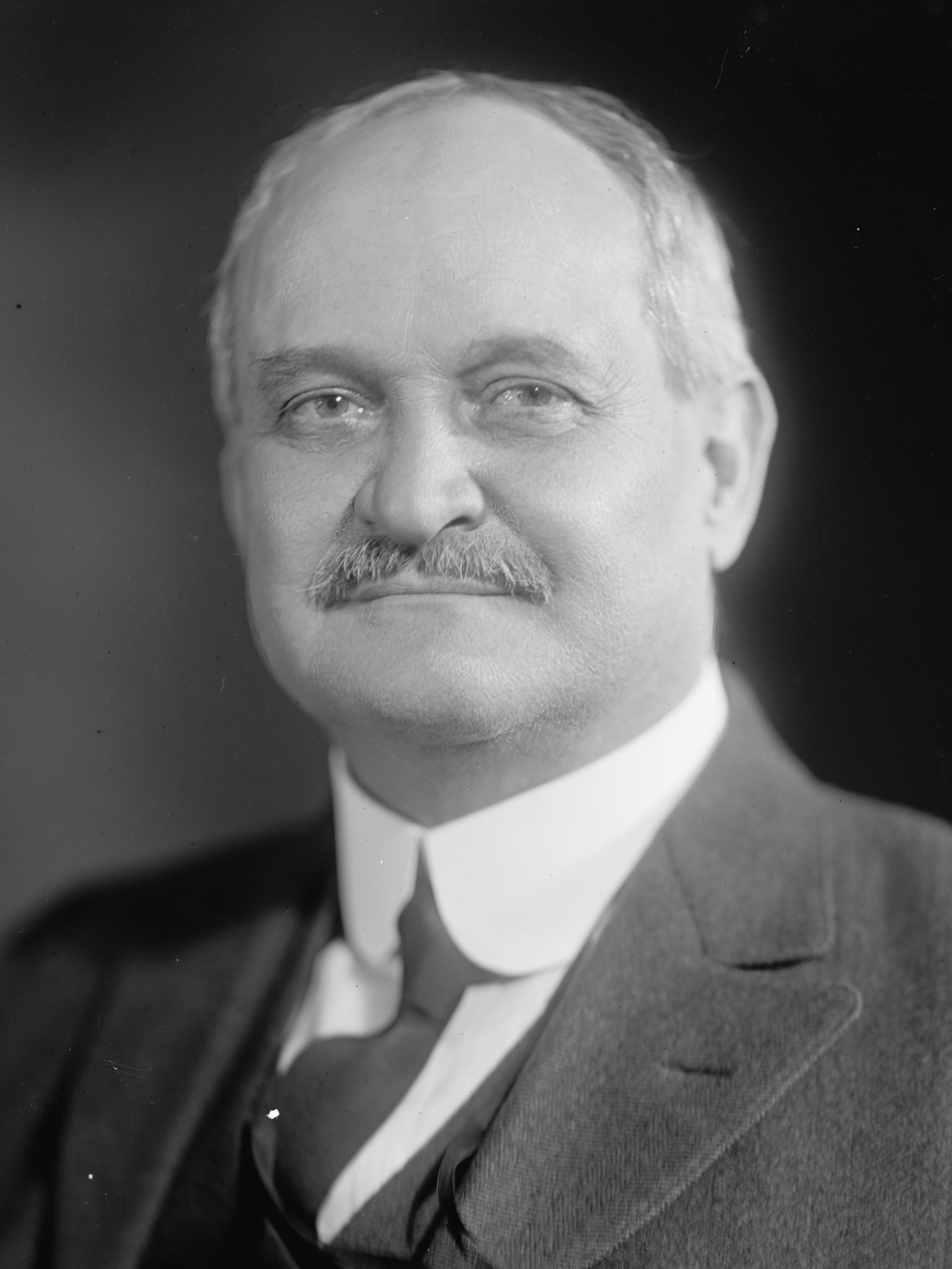

Nominee	Westmoreland Davis	T. J. Muncy
Party	Democratic	Republican
Popular vote	64,266	24,957
Percentage	71.47%	27.77%
- County and independent city results Davis: 50–60% 60–70% 70–80% 80–90% >90% Muncy: 50–60% 60–70% 70–80%
Governor before election
Henry Carter Stuart
Democratic
Elected Governor
Westmoreland Davis
Democratic

The 1917 Virginia gubernatorial election was held on November 6, 1917, to elect the governor of Virginia.

== Results ==
Virginia gubernatorial election, 1917
Party	Candidate	Votes	%
Democratic	Westmoreland Davis	64,266	71.47%
Republican	T. J. Muncy	24,957	27.77%
Socialist	Frank Smith	680	0.76%
Total votes		89,903	100.00%
Democratic hold			
