= 1914 Ohio gubernatorial election =

- November 3, 1914
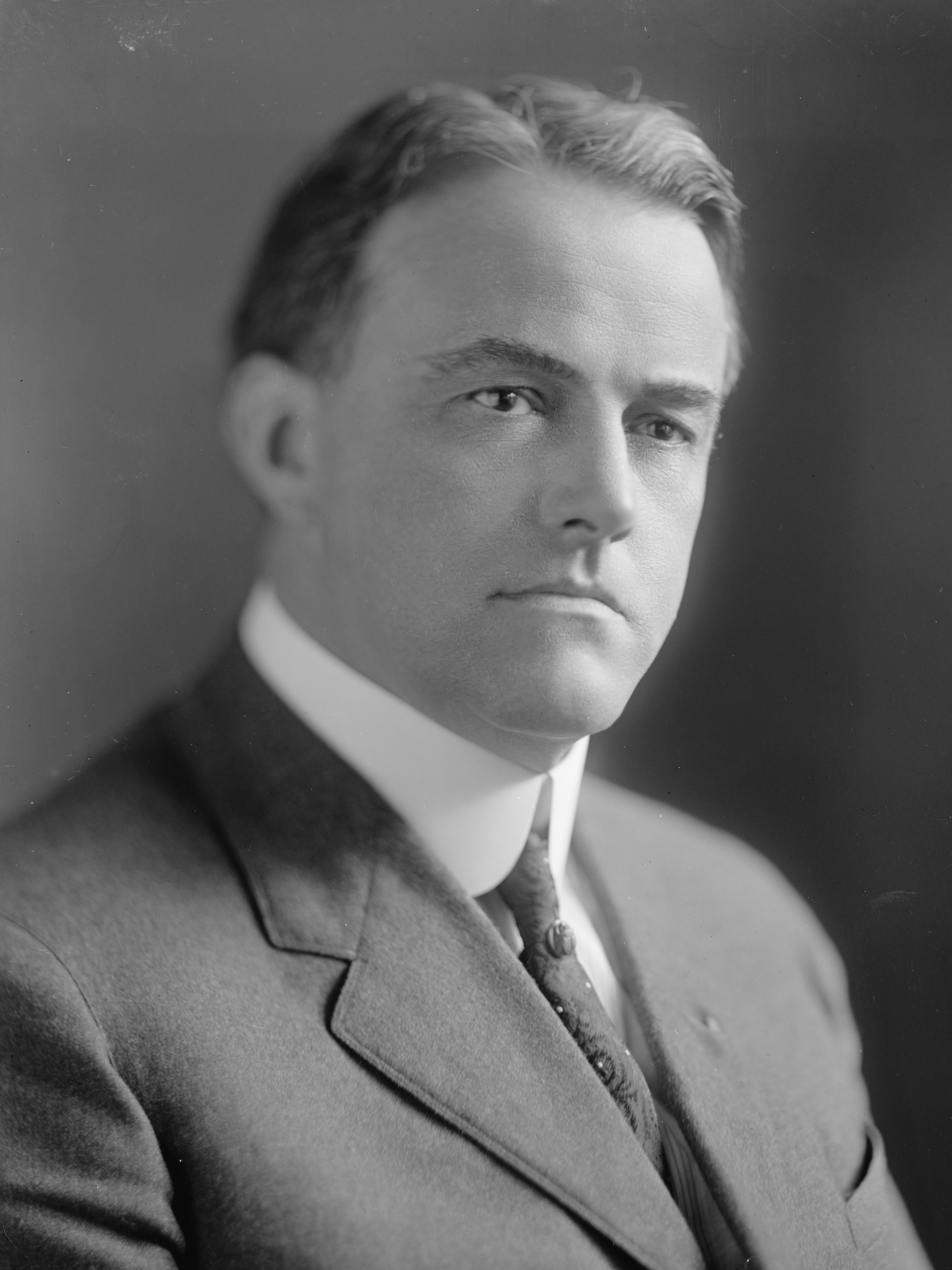

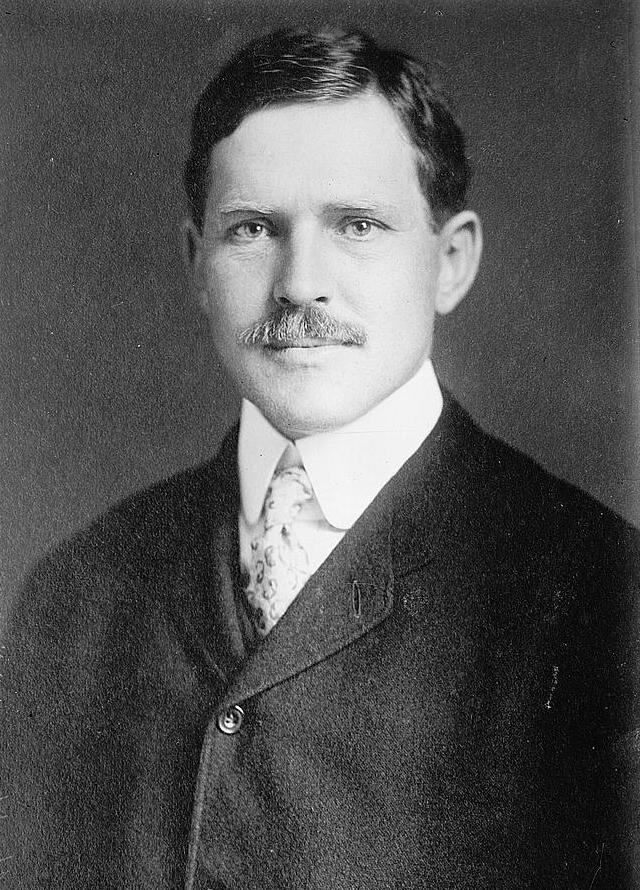
Nominee	Frank B. Willis	James M. Cox	James Rudolph Garfield
Party	Republican	Democratic	Progressive
Popular vote	523,074	493,804	60,904
Percentage	46.32%	43.73%	5.39%
- County results Willis: 30–40% 40–50% 50–60% 60–70% Cox: 40–50% 50–60%
Governor before election
James M. Cox
Democratic
Elected Governor
Frank B. Willis
Republican

The 1914 Ohio gubernatorial election was held on November 3, 1914. Republican nominee Frank B. Willis defeated incumbent Democratic governor James M. Cox and Progressive nominee James Rudolph Garfield with 46.32% of the vote.

== General election ==
=== Candidates ===
Major party candidates

- Frank B. Willis, Republican
- James M. Cox, Democratic

Other candidates

- James Rudolph Garfield, Progressive
- Scott Wilkins, Socialist

=== Results ===
1914 Ohio gubernatorial election
Party	Candidate	Votes	%	±%
Republican	Frank B. Willis	523,074	46.32%	
Democratic	James M. Cox (incumbent)	493,804	43.73%	
Progressive	James Rudolph Garfield	60,904	5.39%	
Socialist	Scott Wilkins	51,441	4.56%	
Majority		29,270		
Turnout				
Republican gain from Democratic		Swing		
