= Frederick Mansfield =

American politician (1877-1958)

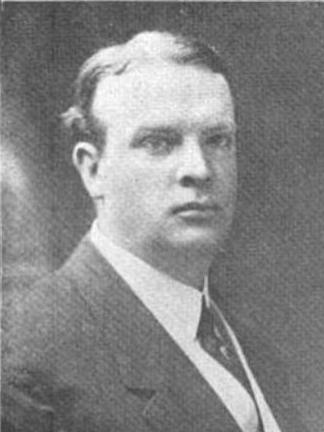
- Mansfield, circa 1917

Mayor of Boston
- In office January 1, 1934 – January 3, 1938
- Preceded by: James Michael Curley
- Succeeded by: Maurice J. Tobin

38th Treasurer and Receiver-General of Massachusetts
- In office 1914–1915
- Governor: David I. Walsh
- Preceded by: Elmer A. Stevens
- Succeeded by: Charles L. Burrill
- Majority: 17,002

Personal details
- Born: Frederick William Mansfield; March 26, 1877 East Boston, Massachusetts, U.S.
- Died: November 6, 1958 (aged 81) Boston, Massachusetts, U.S.
- Resting place: Holyhood Cemetery in Brookline, Massachusetts
- Party: Democratic
- Spouse: Helen Elizabeth Roe (June 29, 1904)
- Children: Walter R. Mansfield
- Education: Boston University School of Law

Military service
- Branch/service: United States Navy
- Years of service: 1898
- Unit: USS Vulcan
- Battles/wars: Spanish–American War

Frederick William Mansfield (March 26, 1877 – November 6, 1958) was an American politician who served as the mayor of Boston, Massachusetts.

== Early life ==
Mansfield was born in East Boston, Massachusetts, March 26, 1877. Mansfield was the son of Michael Read Mansfield and Catherine (McDonough) Mansfield, both of whom had immigrated from Ireland.

Mansfield graduated from East Boston High School in 1894 and went on to Boston University School of Law, where he received a L.L.B. degree in 1902.

Mansfield served as an apothecary in the U.S. Navy on the USS Vulcan during the Spanish–American War. After working as a pharmacist, Mansfield was admitted to the Massachusetts Bar in 1902. From 1928 to 1931 he was president of the Massachusetts Bar Association.

== Early political career ==
In 1913, Mansfield was elected treasurer and receiver general of the Commonwealth of Massachusetts serving from 1914 to 1915. In 1914, he lost his bid for re-election to Charles L. Burrill. He was an unsuccessful candidate for Governor of Massachusetts in 1916 and 1917.

== Mayoralty ==
Mansfield ran for Mayor of Boston twice. He finished second to his bitter rival James Michael Curley in November 1929, then topped a field of six candidates in November 1933.

He served as mayor from 1934 to 1938, during which he modernized the city's auditing and accounting systems while reducing the city's debt. Despite this, he was unsuccessful in his attempts to centralize the city's many departments. He took advantage of the Works Progress Administration to build the Huntington Avenue subway, a $1.715 million project the city only had to pay $539,227 for. He promoted the sales tax and favored low-income housing, as opposed to substandard housing.

He was not eligible to run for re-election, as Massachusetts law at the time did not allow the Mayor of Boston to serve consecutive terms.

== Personal life ==
Mansfield married Helen Elizabeth Roe on June 29, 1904. Mansfield's son, Walter Roe Mansfield, was born on July 1, 1911.

== Death ==
Mansfield died in St. Elizabeth's Hospital, Boston, Massachusetts, November 6, 1958. He was buried in Holyhood Cemetery in Brookline, Massachusetts.

== See also ==
- Timeline of Boston, 1930s

== Bibliography ==
- Hevesi, Dennis.: William R. Mansfield, Federal Judge is Dead at 75, New York Times (January 8, 1987).

Party political offices
Preceded by Joseph L. P. St. Coeur	Democratic nominee for Treasurer and Receiver-General of Massachusetts; 1913, 1914	Succeeded by Henry L. Bowles
Preceded by David I. Walsh	Democratic nominee for Governor of Massachusetts; 1916, 1917	Succeeded by Richard H. Long
Political offices
Preceded by Elmer A. Stevens	Treasurer and Receiver General, Commonwealth of Massachusetts; 1914–1915	Succeeded by Charles L. Burrill
Preceded by James Michael Curley	Mayor of Boston, Massachusetts; 1934–1938	Succeeded by Maurice Tobin
