= 1917 Massachusetts gubernatorial election =

- November 6, 1917
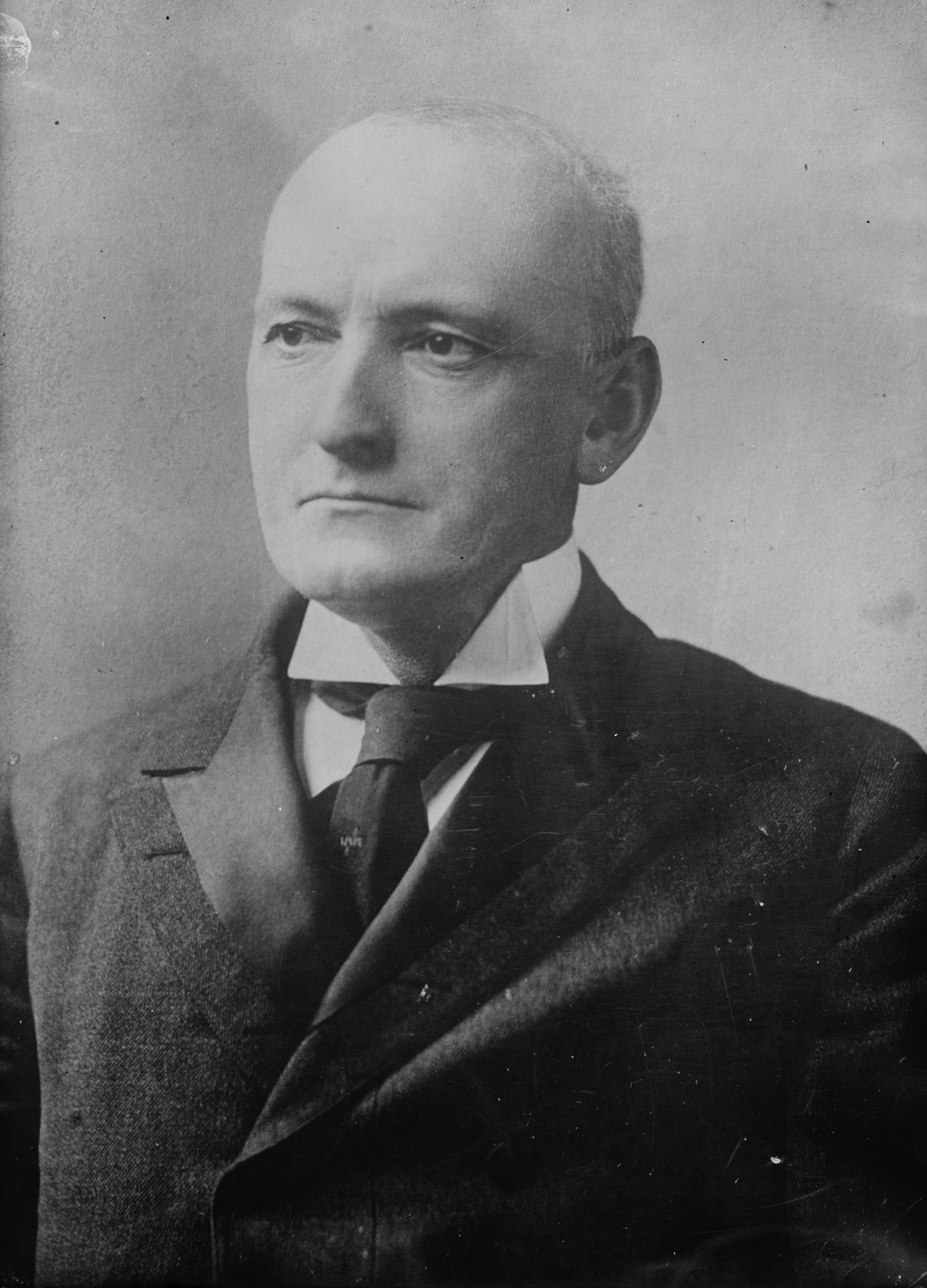

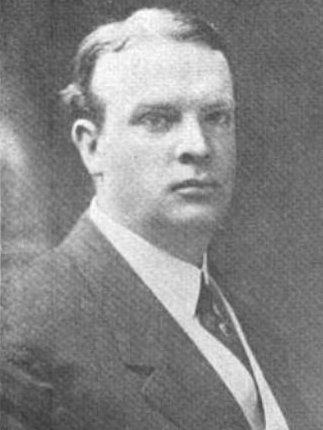
Nominee	Samuel W. McCall	Frederick Mansfield
Party	Republican	Democratic
Popular vote	226,145	135,676
Percentage	58.29%	34.97%
- McCall: 40-50% 50–60% 60–70% 70–80% 80–90% >90% Mansfield: 40-50% 50–60% 70–80%
Governor before election
Samuel W. McCall
Republican
Elected Governor
Samuel W. McCall
Republican

The 1917 Massachusetts gubernatorial election was held on November 6, 1917.

== Republican primary ==
=== Governor ===
==== Candidates ====
- Grafton D. Cushing, former lieutenant governor and former speaker of the Massachusetts House of Representatives
- Samuel W. McCall, incumbent governor

==== Results ====
1917 Republican gubernatorial primary
Party	Candidate	Votes	%
Republican	Samuel W. McCall (incumbent)	82,641	77.34%
Republican	Grafton D. Cushing	24,212	22.66%
Write-in	All others	3	0.00%
Total votes		106,856	100.00%

=== Lieutenant governor ===
==== Candidates ====
- Calvin Coolidge, incumbent lieutenant governor

==== Results ====
Lieutenant Governor Coolidge was unopposed for the Republican nomination.

1917 Republican lieutenant gubernatorial primary
Party	Candidate	Votes	%
Republican	Calvin Coolidge (incumbent)	95,858	99.99%
Write-in	All others	9	0.01%
Total votes		95,867	100.00%

== Democratic primary ==
=== Governor ===
==== Candidates ====
- Frederick Mansfield, former treasurer and receiver-general of Massachusetts and nominee for governor in 1916

==== Results ====
Mansfield was unopposed for the Democratic nomination.

1917 Democratic gubernatorial primary
Party	Candidate	Votes	%
Democratic	Frederick Mansfield	44,155	99.94%
Write-in	All others	27	0.06%
Total votes		44,182	100.00%

=== Lieutenant governor ===
==== Candidates ====
- Matthew Hale, national chairman of the Progressive Party, delegate-at-large to the 1917 Constitutional Convention, and former publisher of the Boston Journal

==== Results ====
Hale was unopposed for the Democratic nomination. He also received the Progressive and Prohibition Party nominations.

1917 Democratic lieutenant gubernatorial primary
Party	Candidate	Votes	%
Democratic	Matthew Hale	6,518	98.89%
Write-in	All others	73	1.11%
Total votes		6,591	100.00%

== General election ==
=== Candidates ===
- James Hayes, perennial candidate from Plymouth (Socialist Labor)
- Chester R. Lawrence, perennial candidate from Boston (Prohibition)
- Frederick Mansfield, former treasurer and receiver-general (Democratic)
- Samuel W. McCall, incumbent governor (Republican)
- John McCarty, perennial candidate from Abington (Socialist)

=== Results ===
1917 Massachusetts gubernatorial election
Party	Candidate	Votes	%	±%
Republican	Samuel W. McCall (incumbent)	226,145	58.29%	▲5.84
Democratic	Frederick Mansfield	135,676	34.97%	▼8.70
Socialist	John McCarty	16,608	4.28%	▲2.27
Socialist Labor	James Hayes	5,243	1.35%	▲0.61
Prohibition	Chester Lawrence	4,265	1.10%	▼0.03
Write-in	All others	0	0.00%	
Total votes		387,937	100.00%	

== See also ==
- 1917 Massachusetts legislature

== Bibliography ==
- Office of the Secretary of the Commonwealth (1917). Election Statistics, 1917. Boston, MA.
- Office of the Secretary of the Commonwealth (1919). Election Statistics, 1918. Boston, MA.
