= 1910 Connecticut gubernatorial election =

- November 8, 1910

Nominee	Simeon E. Baldwin	Charles A. Goodwin	Robert Hunter
Party	Democratic	Republican	Socialist
Popular vote	77,243	73,528	12,179
Percentage	46.48%	44.25%	7.33%
- Baldwin: 30–40% 40–50% 50–60% 60–70% Goodwin: 40–50% 50–60% 60–70% 70–80%
Governor before election
Frank B. Weeks
Republican
Elected Governor
Simeon E. Baldwin
Democratic

The 1910 Connecticut gubernatorial election was held on November 8, 1910. Democratic nominee Simeon E. Baldwin defeated Republican nominee Charles A. Goodwin with 46.48% of the vote. This was the first such election in which a candidate won with only a plurality of the vote, as the state constitution no longer required a subsequent vote by the Connecticut General Assembly in the absence of a majority.

Governor George L. Lilley, who was elected in 1908, died in office after three months in office. Frank B. Weeks, who ascended to the office following Lilley's death, did not run for reelection.

== General election ==
=== Candidates ===
Major party candidates

- Simeon E. Baldwin, Democratic
- Charles A. Goodwin, Republican

Other candidates

- Robert Hunter, Socialist
- Emil L. G. Hohenthal, Prohibition
- Frederick Fellerman, Socialist Labor

=== Results ===
1910 Connecticut gubernatorial election
Party	Candidate	Votes	%	±%
Democratic	Simeon E. Baldwin	77,243	46.48%	
Republican	Charles A. Goodwin	73,528	44.25%	
Socialist	Robert Hunter	12,179	7.33%	
Prohibition	Emil L. G. Hohenthal	2,026	1.22%	
Socialist Labor	Frederick Fellerman	1,205	0.73%	
Majority		3,715		
Turnout				
Democratic gain from Republican		Swing		
