= 1912 Connecticut lieutenant gubernatorial election =

- November 5, 1912
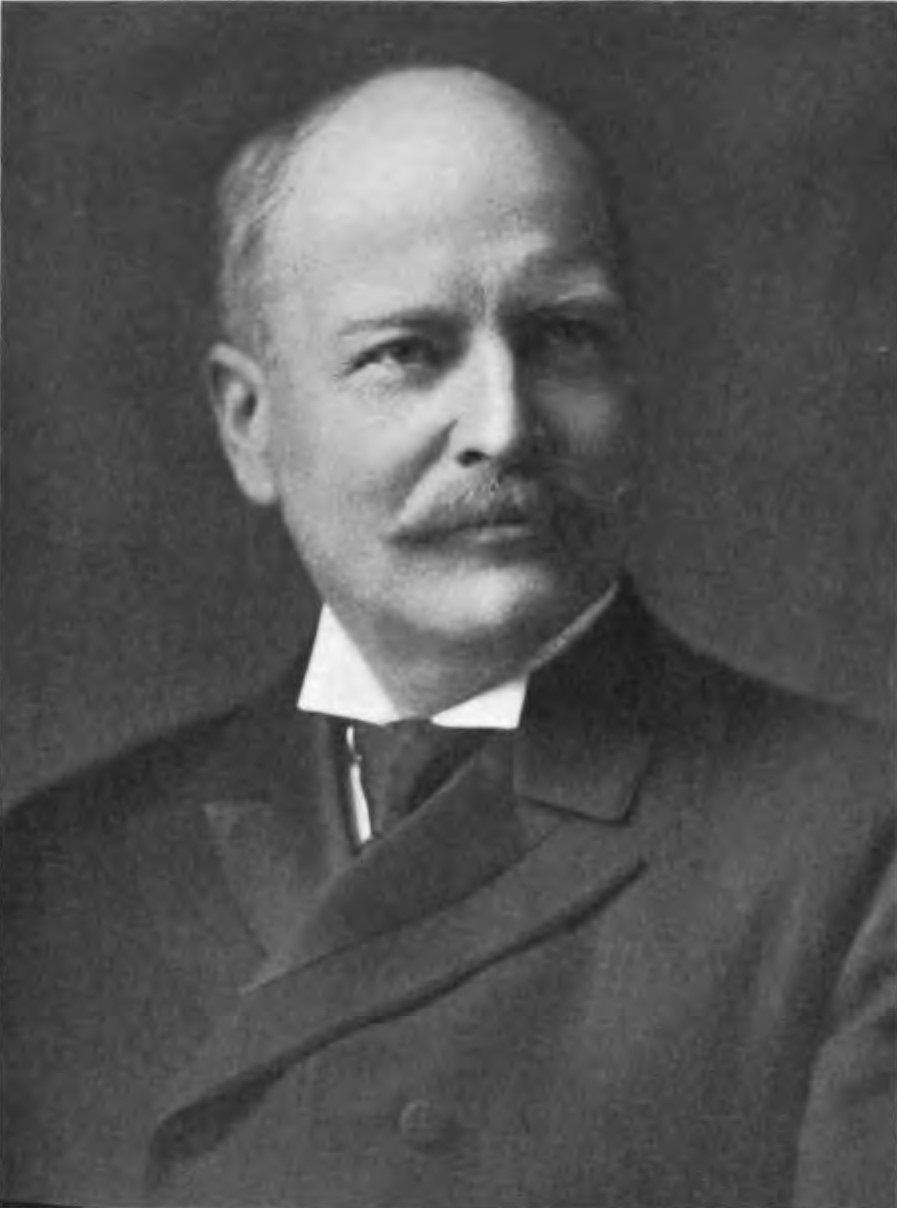

Nominee	Lyman T. Tingier	Charles S. Peck
Party	Democratic	Republican
Popular vote	75,774	68,793
Percentage	52.40%	47.60%
Lieutenant Governor before election
Dennis A. Blakeslee
Republican
Elected Lieutenant Governor
Lyman T. Tingier
Democratic

The 1912 Connecticut lieutenant gubernatorial election was held on November 5, 1912, to elect the lieutenant governor of Connecticut. Democratic nominee and incumbent member of the Connecticut House of Representatives Lyman T. Tingier won the election against Republican nominee and incumbent member of the Connecticut Senate Charles S. Peck.

== General election ==
On election day, November 5, 1912, Democratic nominee Lyman T. Tingier won the election with 52.40% of the vote, thereby gaining Democratic control over the office of lieutenant governor. Tingier was sworn in as the 75th lieutenant governor of Connecticut on January 8, 1913.

=== Results ===
Connecticut lieutenant gubernatorial election, 1912
Party	Candidate	Votes	%
Democratic	Lyman T. Tingier	75,774	52.40
Republican	Charles S. Peck	68,793	47.60
Total votes		144,567	100.00
Democratic gain from Republican			
