= Thomas J. Spellacy =

American politician (1880–1857)

Thomas Joseph Spellacy
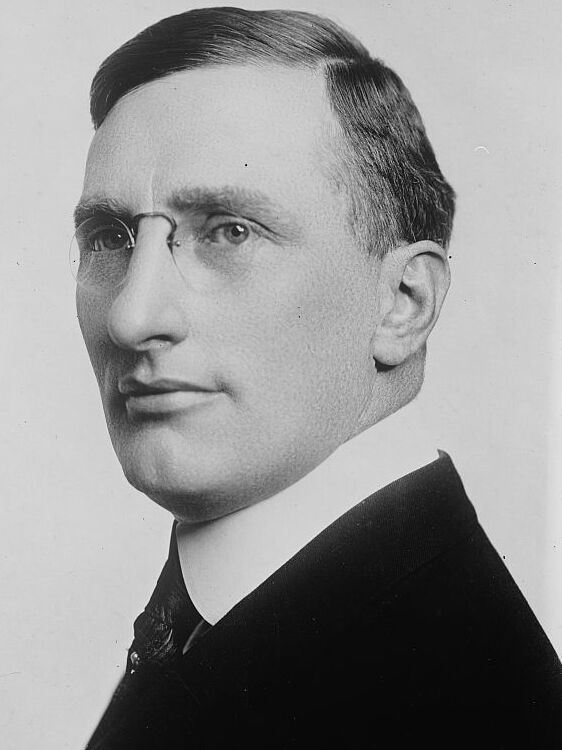

47th Mayor of Hartford, Connecticut
- In office December 3, 1935 – June 18, 1943
- Preceded by: John A. Pilgard
- Succeeded by: Dennis P. O'Connor

United States Attorney for the District of Connecticut
- In office 1915–1918
- President: Woodrow Wilson
- Preceded by: Frederick A. Scott
- Succeeded by: John Francis Crosby

Member of the Connecticut State Senate
- In office 1911–1915
- In office 1907–1909

Personal details
- Born: March 6, 1880 Hartford, Connecticut, U.S.
- Died: December 5, 1957 (aged 77) New York City, U.S.
- Party: Democratic
- Spouse(s): Nellie Walsh (d. 1932); Elisabeth Gill
- Education: College of the Holy Cross (BA); Georgetown University (LLB)

Thomas Joseph Spellacy (March 6, 1880 – December 5, 1957) was an American politician and lawyer. He was the 47th mayor of Hartford, Connecticut, held several other offices, and was one of Connecticut's most prominent Democrats over a period of more than 50 years.

== Early life and career ==
Spellacy was born in Hartford, the son of James Spellacy, a contractor, and Catherine (Bourke) Spellacy. He attended Hartford Public High School, Miss Burbank's Private School and the College of the Holy Cross. He received a degree from Georgetown University Law School in 1901. He was admitted to the bar in Tennessee in 1901 and in Connecticut in 1903. Also in 1903 he married Nellie Walsh of Middletown, Connecticut.

Early in his career, Spellacy blended his interests in journalism, law and politics. He started a student publication that circulated in the Hartford public schools and worked as a reporter for the Hartford Telegram prior to attending law school. He was a part owner of the Hartford Sunday Globe and briefly the owner of the Hartford Evening Post, both of which were sold to other Hartford newspapers.

He was elected to the Connecticut State Senate in 1906, failed to win renomination in 1908 and recaptured the nomination and his seat in 1910. He was the Democratic nominee for Mayor of Hartford, while serving as the city's party chairman, in 1912, losing to Col. Louis R. Cheney in a spring election. Later that year Spellacy was a delegate to the Democratic National Convention for the first of five times. He ran unsuccessfully for Mayor of Hartford in 1914, losing the Democratic nomination to Joseph H. Lawler, the eventual winner. President Woodrow Wilson appointed him United States Attorney for the District of Connecticut to fill the unexpired term of Frederick Scott in 1915.

Spellacy, while still serving as U.S. Attorney, was the Democratic nominee for Governor of Connecticut in 1918 and lost to the incumbent, Marcus H. Holcomb. Shortly after the election, the World War I armistice went into effect and Spellacy resigned his position as United States Attorney to become the legal advisor to the Assistant Secretary of the Navy, Franklin D. Roosevelt, in the settlement of claims involving the Navy and various allied powers in Europe during the winter of 1918–1919. Both Spellacy and Roosevelt returned on the USS George Washington with President Wilson, who was returning from the Paris Peace Conference.

== National politics ==
After his return from Europe in 1919, Spellacy was appointed Assistant Attorney General of the United States and was in charge of the enemy custodianship department. He argued three cases for the government before the Supreme Court while acting in this capacity. He received an honorary Doctor of Laws (LL.D.) from Georgetown University in 1920.

During this period Spellacy became more active in national Democratic party politics, again serving as delegate to the 1920 national convention, where he was Chairman of the Rules Committee and manager of the presidential campaign of Attorney General A. Mitchell Palmer. In one instance his name was associated with possible political advocacy on the part of the Department of Justice. Just two weeks before the 1920 election, John R. Rathom, publisher of the Providence Journal, charged that Franklin Delano Roosevelt, the Democratic candidate for Vice President, had acted improperly while Assistant Secretary of the Navy in releasing sailors convicted on morals charges in the Newport sex scandal from Portsmouth Naval Prison. Spellacy, along with Francis G. Caffey, the U.S. Attorney in New York, released information from Justice Department files that discredited Rathom.

After leaving government service in February, 1921, he became the law partner of two other officials involved in the custody and liquidation of enemy property seized during the war, forming the New York City firm of Garvan, Corbett and Spellacy, with its office on Wall Street.

Connecticut's Democrats nominated Spellacy for the United States Senate in 1922, but he was defeated by the incumbent, former governor George P. McLean. He was again a delegate to the 1924 Democratic national convention, supporting Gov. Alfred E. Smith of New York, while himself receiving a vote on each of the 41st and 42nd ballots, and was eastern regional campaign manager for the eventual compromise nominee (chosen after Smith and the other leading contender, William Gibbs McAdoo, deadlocked), John W. Davis.

Spellacy was a member of the Democratic National Committee from 1926 to 1928. He continued to be a supporter of Alfred Smith in both the year the "Happy Warrior" was the party's nominee, 1928, and in 1932, when Smith lost the Democratic presidential nomination to Franklin D. Roosevelt. Spellacy did not attend the Democratic convention in 1932 due to his wife's ill health; she died later that summer. He remarried in 1934; his second wife, Elisabeth B. Gill, was thirty years his junior. She was the sister of the journalist and author Brendan Gill. They had one child, a son, Bourke Gill Spellacy (1937–), a founder of the Hartford law firm Updike, Kelly & Spellacy, P.C.

== Mayor of Hartford and subsequent career ==
Upon the death of John A. Pilgard—who died only nine days after being elected and before he could take office—Spellacy was elected mayor of Hartford in 1935 by the Board of Aldermen. He was re-elected three times. His tenure in office was marked not only by the effects of the Great Depression and the coming of World War II and the defense boom in Hartford before and during the war, but also by the devastating floods of the spring of 1936 and those resulting from the New England Hurricane of 1938. On June 18, 1943, he made good on a threat to resign if he could not get the Board of Aldermen to adopt his proposal to require residency in the city by municipal employees. He failed in his attempt to return to the office of mayor in 1945.

Spellacy was not thereafter nominated by his party for any elective office. However, he was a member of the Metropolitan District Commission and Park River Flood Commission and was appointed Insurance Commissioner of the State of Connecticut by Gov. Abraham Ribicoff in 1955. He served in that position until his death in New York City while attending a conference of state insurance commissioners on December 5, 1957.

== References in popular culture ==
Illustrator James Montgomery Flagg, best known for creating Uncle Sam and his "I Want You!" World War I recruiting poster, drew a portrait of Spellacy that was used in his 1918 gubernatorial campaign.

The Conquest of America: A Romance of Disaster and Victory, a 1916 novel by Cleveland Moffett, sets a German invasion of the United States five years in the future and names Spellacy as a prominent American taken hostage by the German invaders.

John Gregory Dunne, a Hartford native, named one of the protagonists in his 1977 novel True Confessions Tom Spellacy. Robert Duvall played Spellacy, a Los Angeles detective, in the 1981 film based on the novel.

== Notes ==
Party political offices
Preceded by Morris Beardsley	Democratic nominee for Governor of Connecticut; 1918	Succeeded by Rollin U. Tyler
Preceded by Homer Stille Cummings	Democratic nominee for U.S. Senator from Connecticut (Class 1); 1922	Succeeded by Augustine Lonergan
