= Araucaria (disambiguation) =

Araucaria is a genus of coniferous trees.

Araucaria nay also refer to:

- Araucaria (crossword compiler), pseudonym of the crossword compiler John Galbraith Graham (1921–2013)
- Araucaria (software), argument mapping software
- Araucária, a city and municipality in Paraná state, Brazil
