= China Law Blog =

China Law Blog is an English language legal blog, covering Chinese law and its effects on international business. The blog began publishing in 2006, and it focuses on the legal issues that impact non-Chinese companies that are doing business in or with China. Its coverage includes the contractual, intellectual property, foreign investment, manufacturing, international trade, and disputes these companies face.

== History and coverage ==
China Law Blog began publishing in 2006. Its original writers, Dan Harris and Steve Dickinson were attorneys at Harris Moure at the time, and they co-led the firm's international law practice. Harris Moure is now Harris Sliwoski and Steve Dickinson has retired from the practice of law and from writing for the blog. Dan Harris remains as the blog's lead writer. The blog describes its mission as explaining how Chinese law applies to commercial transactions and disputes and its goal is to help foreign businesses avoid legal problems.

The blog also sometimes discusses broader legal, business, and political issues that impact companies that do business with China. In an interview published by Cheung Kong Graduate School of Business, Harris discussed the blog's coverage of changes in Chinese law enforcement, intellectual property rights, foreign investment regulations, and anti-corruption measures.

== Recognition ==
It was chosen as one of the top 100 law blogs (blawgs) by the ABA Journal (journal of the American Bar Association) in 2007, 2008, 2009 and 2010. In 2012, the ABA Journal chose it as one of the 100 best law blogs of all time and inducted it into its Blawg Hall of Fame. It also was voted best China Business/Law Blog in a contest sponsored by Chinalyst and Business Week named it as its blog of the week.

== Use as a legal research resource ==
China Law Blog is in several guides for China legal research. The Yale Law School Library lists it among resources addressing Chinese law and business issues and Harvard Law School lists it in its China research guide, describing it as a business law blog written from a practitioner's perspective. It is also listed in the University of California College of the Law, San Francisco Chinese Law Research Guide. The Law Library of the U.S. Congress lists it as a Chinese law resource and preserves many of its posts.
