= Kirchwey =

Kirchwey is a surname. Notable people with the surname include:

- Freda Kirchwey (1893–1976), American journalist, editor and publisher
- George (Washington) Kirchwey (1855–1942), American legal scholar
- Karl Kirchwey, American poet
