= Governor Weeks =

Governor Weeks may refer to:

- Frank B. Weeks (1854–1935), 64th Governor of Connecticut
- John E. Weeks (1853–1949), 61st Governor of Vermont
