= 1914 Connecticut gubernatorial election =

- November 3, 1914
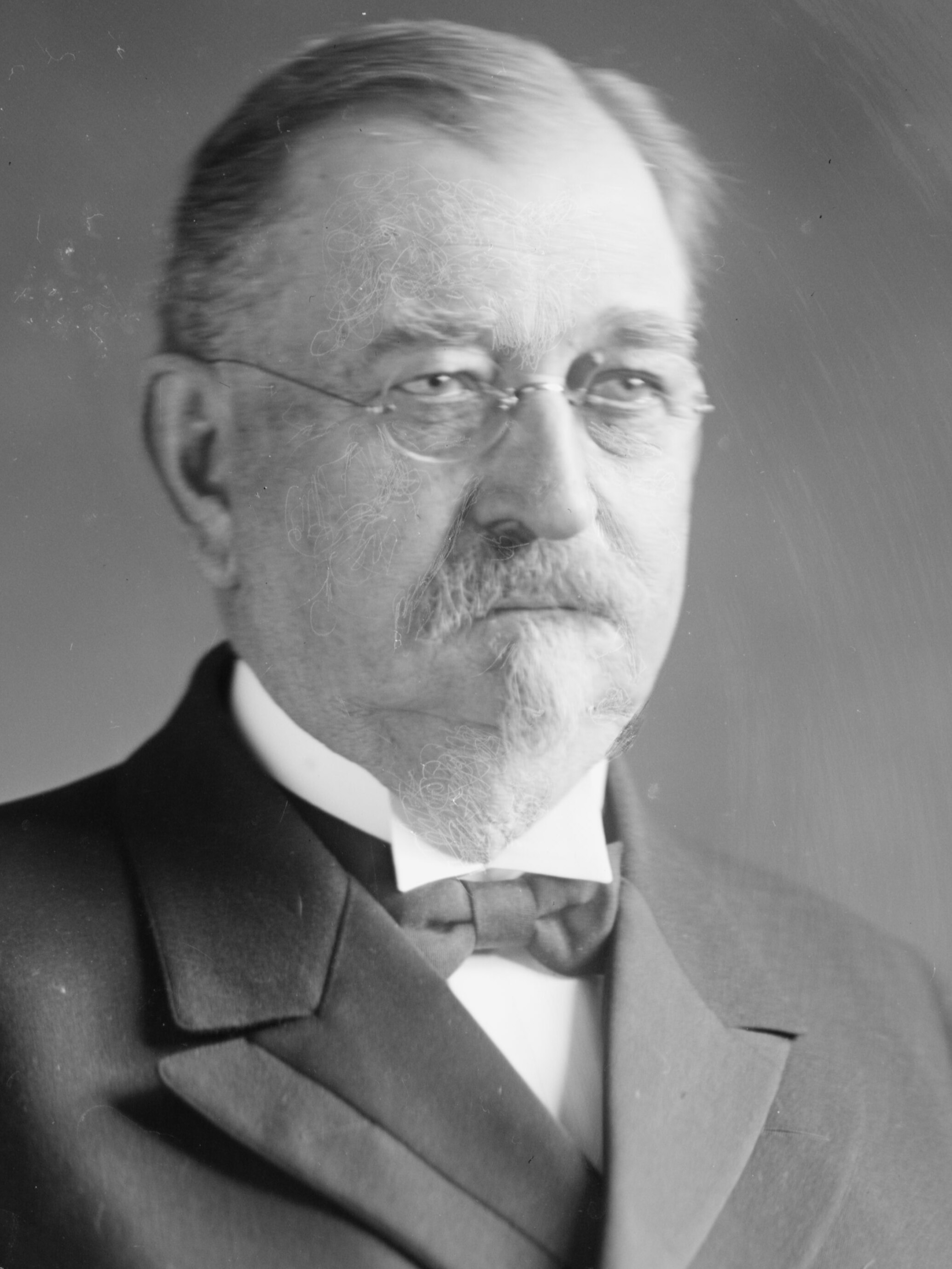

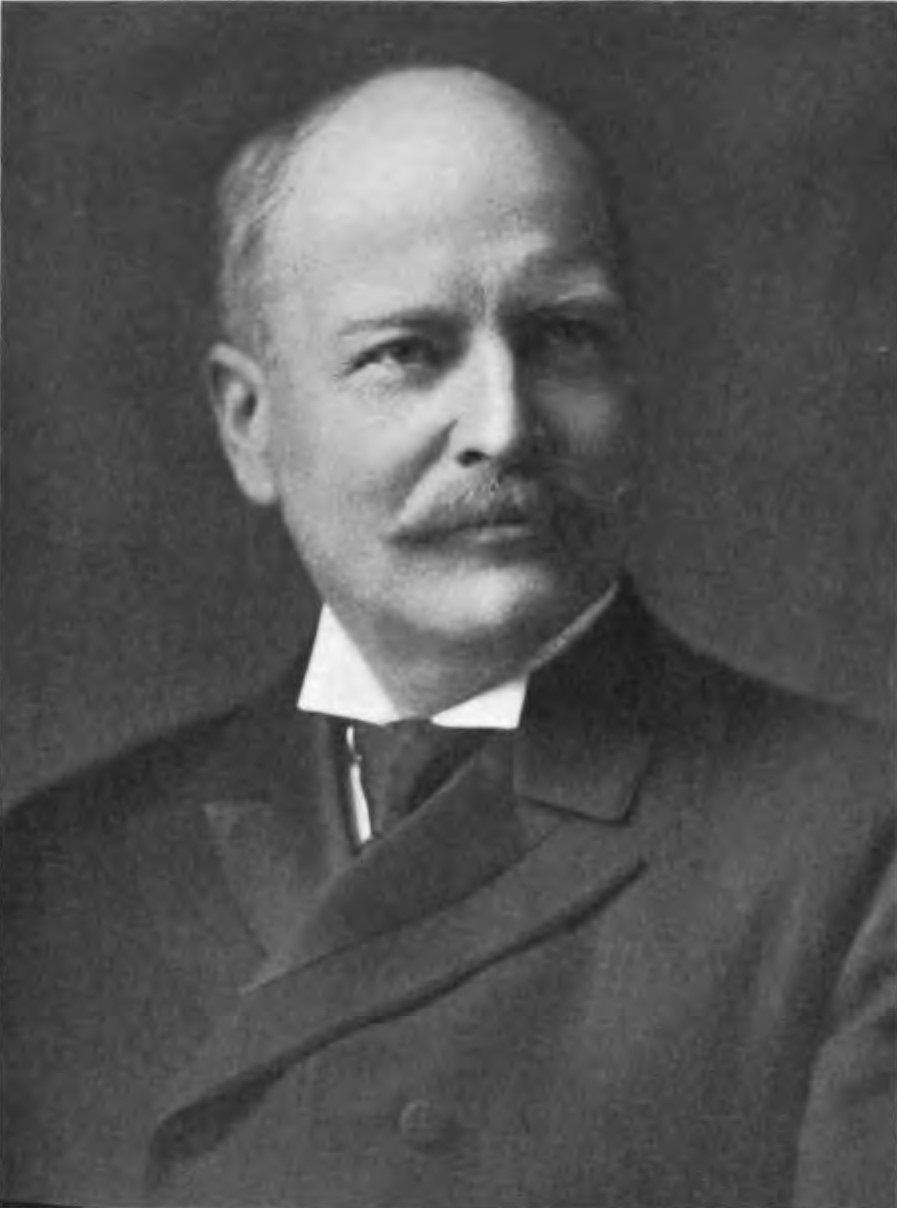
Nominee	Marcus H. Holcomb	Lyman T. Tingier
Party	Republican	Democratic
Popular vote	91,262	73,888
Percentage	50.39%	40.80%
- Holcomb: 40–50% 50–60% 60–70% 70–80% 80–90% Tingier: 40–50% 50–60% 60–70%
Governor before election
Simeon E. Baldwin
Democratic
Elected Governor
Marcus H. Holcomb
Republican

The 1914 Connecticut gubernatorial election was held on November 3, 1914. Republican nominee Marcus H. Holcomb defeated Democratic nominee Lyman T. Tingier with 50.39% of the vote.

== General election ==
=== Candidates ===
Major party candidates

- Marcus H. Holcomb, Republican
- Lyman T. Tingier, Democratic

Other candidates

- W. Fisher, Progressive
- Samuel E. Beardsley, Socialist
- Duane N. Griffin, Prohibition
- Charles B. Wells, Socialist Labor

=== Results ===
1914 Connecticut gubernatorial election
Party	Candidate	Votes	%	±%
Republican	Marcus H. Holcomb	91,262	50.39%	
Democratic	Lyman T. Tingier	73,888	40.80%	
Progressive	W. Fisher	8,030	4.43%	
Socialist	Samuel E. Beardsley	5,914	3.27%	
Prohibition	Duane N. Griffin	1,380	0.76%	
Socialist Labor	Charles B. Wells	633	0.35%	
Majority		17,374		
Turnout				
Republican gain from Democratic		Swing		
