= 1906 Connecticut Attorney General election =

- November 6, 1906
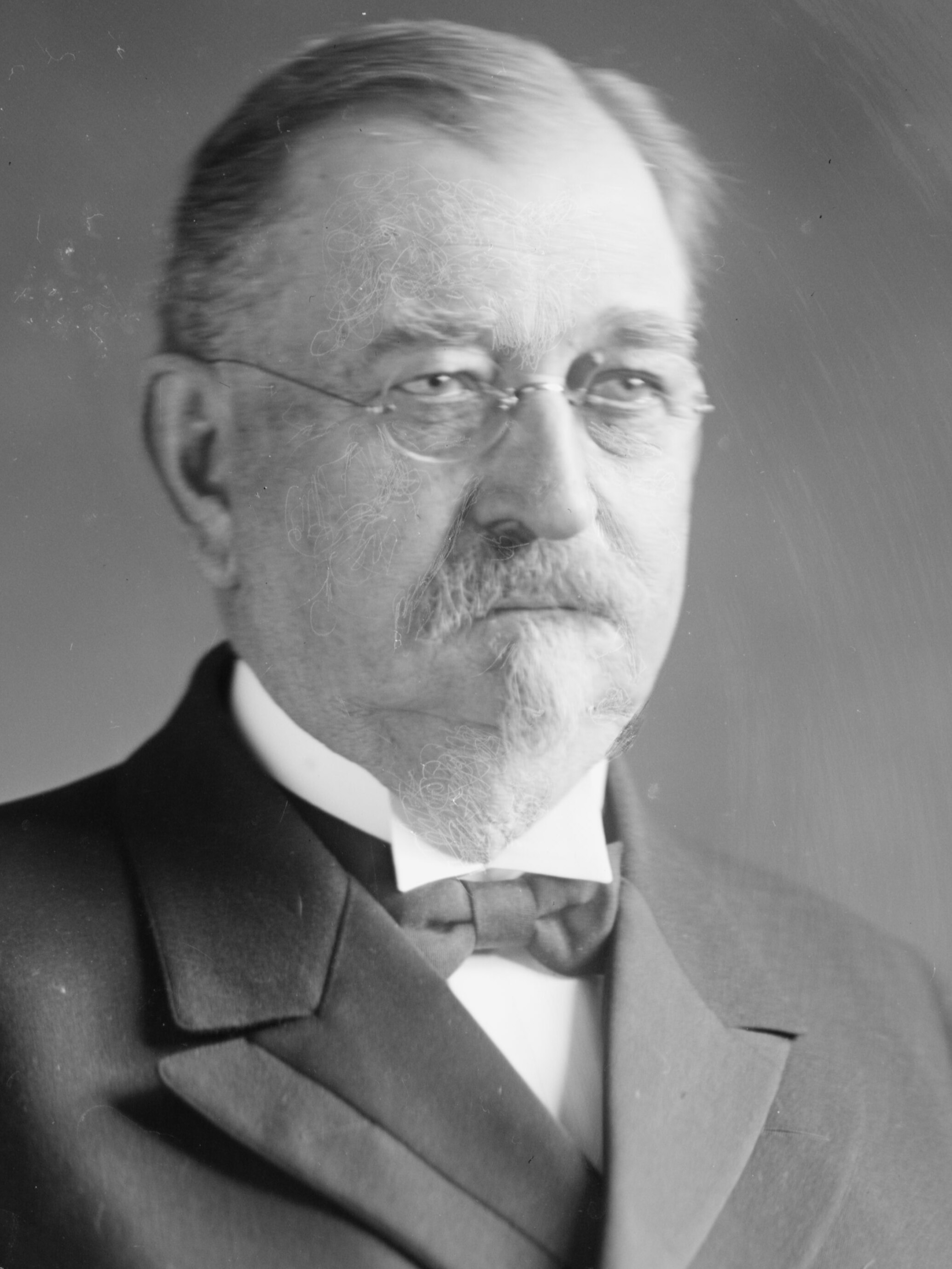

Nominee	Marcus H. Holcomb	William B. Stoddard
Party	Republican	Democratic
Popular vote	89,353	67,163
Percentage	57.1%	42.9%
- Holcomb: 50–60% 60–70% 70–80% 80–90% Stoddard: 50–60% 60–70% Tie: 50%
Attorney General before election
William A. King
Republican
Elected Attorney General
Marcus H. Holcomb
Republican

The 1906 Connecticut Attorney General election was held on November 6, 1906. to elect the next Attorney General of Connecticut. Republican candidate and State Senator Marcus H. Holcomb defeated Democratic candidate William B. Stoddard.

== General election ==
On election day, November 6, 1906, Republican nominee Marcus H. Holcomb won the election by a margin of 22,190 votes against his opponent Democratic nominee William B. Stoddard, thereby retaining Republican control over the office of Attorney General. Holcomb was sworn in as the 3rd Attorney General of Connecticut in 1907.

=== Results ===
Connecticut Attorney General election, 1906
Party	Candidate	Votes	%
Republican	Marcus H. Holcomb	89,353	57.09%
Democratic	William B. Stoddard	67,163	42.91%
Total votes		156,516	100.00%
Republican hold			
