= Araucaria (software) =

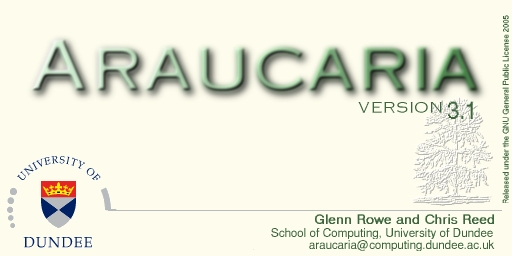
- Developers: Chris Reed, Glenn Rowe
- Stable release: 3.1 / June 27, 2006; 19 years ago
- Written in: Java
- Operating system: Windows; Mac OS X Unix; Linux; Solaris
- Type: Argument mapping software
- License: GNU General Public License
- Website: araucaria.computing.dundee.ac.uk/doku.php

Araucaria is an argument mapping software tool developed in 2001 by Chris Reed and Glenn Rowe, in the Argumentation Research Group at the School of Computing in the University of Dundee, Scotland. It is designed to visually represent arguments through diagrams that can be used for analysis and stored in Argument Markup Language (AML), based on XML. As free software, it is available under the GNU General Public License and may be downloaded for free on the internet.

== How it works ==
The user interface is composed of a main window (diagramming), a schemes editor and the AraucariaDB online interface.

When a text file is loaded into the program, the text is displayed in the left-hand panel of the main window. Highlighting portions of text before clicking on the right (larger) panel creates corresponding nodes at the bottom of that panel. Nodes can then be paired together by dragging one (which will be the premise) to the other (the conclusion). To each node may be attached a value such as the ownership of the proposition, or an evaluation specifying the degree of confidence placed in premise. Similarly, symbols can be added to the arrows to state the strength of the inference. In addition, the user may link arguments, supply missing premises (argument reconstruction) and use refutations. The diagram will always take the form of a tree structure in Araucaria. The user has the choice of translating the argument into standard diagram, Toulmin diagram or Wigmore diagram, Araucaria 3.1 being the first software to integrate the latter ontology and to address the translation issues between the different diagrams.

While Araucaria helps identify the structure of an argument, it provides freedom of analysis resources. The scheme editor allows the user to create argumentation schemes, group them together and save them into a scheme set file. The scheme set is then applied to the diagram, entirely or in part. As an illustration, an argument scheme relying on symptoms could be applied to the following assertion: "The light has gone off. Therefore, the bulb must be broken", with critical questions intended to determine if the result could stem from another reason (such as "have all the lights in the flat gone off?").

The AraucariaDB Online Repository can be browsed to retrieve specific arguments to fit a diagram. Alternatively, an argument diagram, along with annotations, can be saved into the database.

== Technical details ==
Araucaria was developed in Java in order to be supported on most platforms. It is licensed under the GNU General Public License and complies with free software standards. Argument Markup Language (AML) was created to maintain the evolving relationship between text and diagram. To this end, tags are added to the text and specify the connection between each component. AML is designed to be an application of argumentation theory in artificial intelligence.

Because it is based on XML, a standard widely used by developers, AML content can be accessed through other software that support XML. Likewise, AML data is easily available online after using style sheets to create HTML web pages.

Araucaria itself is conceived to be compatible with other tools. One example of integration is the argumentation software library Argkit. The online corpus provision is an extension of the Araucaria project. Further integration is planned with other applications currently under development.

== Applications ==
The software is aimed at providing both a pedagogical tool (enhancing the teaching of critical thinking skills thanks to diagramming) and a support for research within the fields of argumentation theory and informal logic. In addition, it fits professional purposes, as it reduces the time needed to process data.

Among the choices of diagram available to the user, Wigmore charts were intended to be used for legal case analysis. Argument mapping tools are particularly suited to professionals and scholars in the legal field who have a considerable amount of arguments required to be processed in a consistent manner. Araucaria has been used by magistrates in Ontario Courts to help with a large volume of relatively simple cases.

The advantages of using Araucaria in both learning and teaching philosophy was considered by the program's authors, along with other scholars, in a paper published in 2006. They emphasized how much easier it is to explain and summarize philosophers' theories when arguments are visualized in a diagram. A qualitative survey was carried out among students revealing positive results.

Araucaria is similar to other pre-existing software in some of its applications. However, the authors' intention was to "fill a gap" in providing a tool able to "support both teaching and research in argumentation theory".

As of mid-2009, Araucaria is deemed to have approximately 10,000 users, even though that is hard to assess with precision when it comes to software available for free on the internet. IP address logs show that the user base is very wide both on a geographical level (more than 40 countries) and on a sectoral level (range of domains including doctors, statisticians, lawyers and engineers).

== Future developments ==
While Araucaria is arguably one of the most sophisticated diagramming software packages and enjoys an important user base, its interface and features may be viewed as outdated. According to Chris Reed, "a large-scale rewrite is underway, which provides AIF support". It is unknown if this rewrite will be the occasion to turn Araucaria into an online and/or collaborative program. An online tool supporting AIF, albeit with less comprehensive features, was recently developed by Reed's research group (ARG:dundee). An alpha version of this Online Visualisation of Argument (OVA) is available.

In addition, one of Reed's long-time projects had been to tackle the limitations of computer diagramming induced by natural language interpretation, and to add a dialogic argumentation structure to the software. From October 2009 to March 2013, a research program called "Dialectical Argumentation Machines" is attempted to make a first step towards this objective.

== See also ==
- Argument map
- Concept mining
- Heuristic
- Information technology
- Issue-based information system
- Non-monotonic logic
- Ontology
- Semantic Web
- Stephen Toulmin
- Wigmore chart
- XML
