= 1918 Connecticut gubernatorial election =

- November 5, 1918
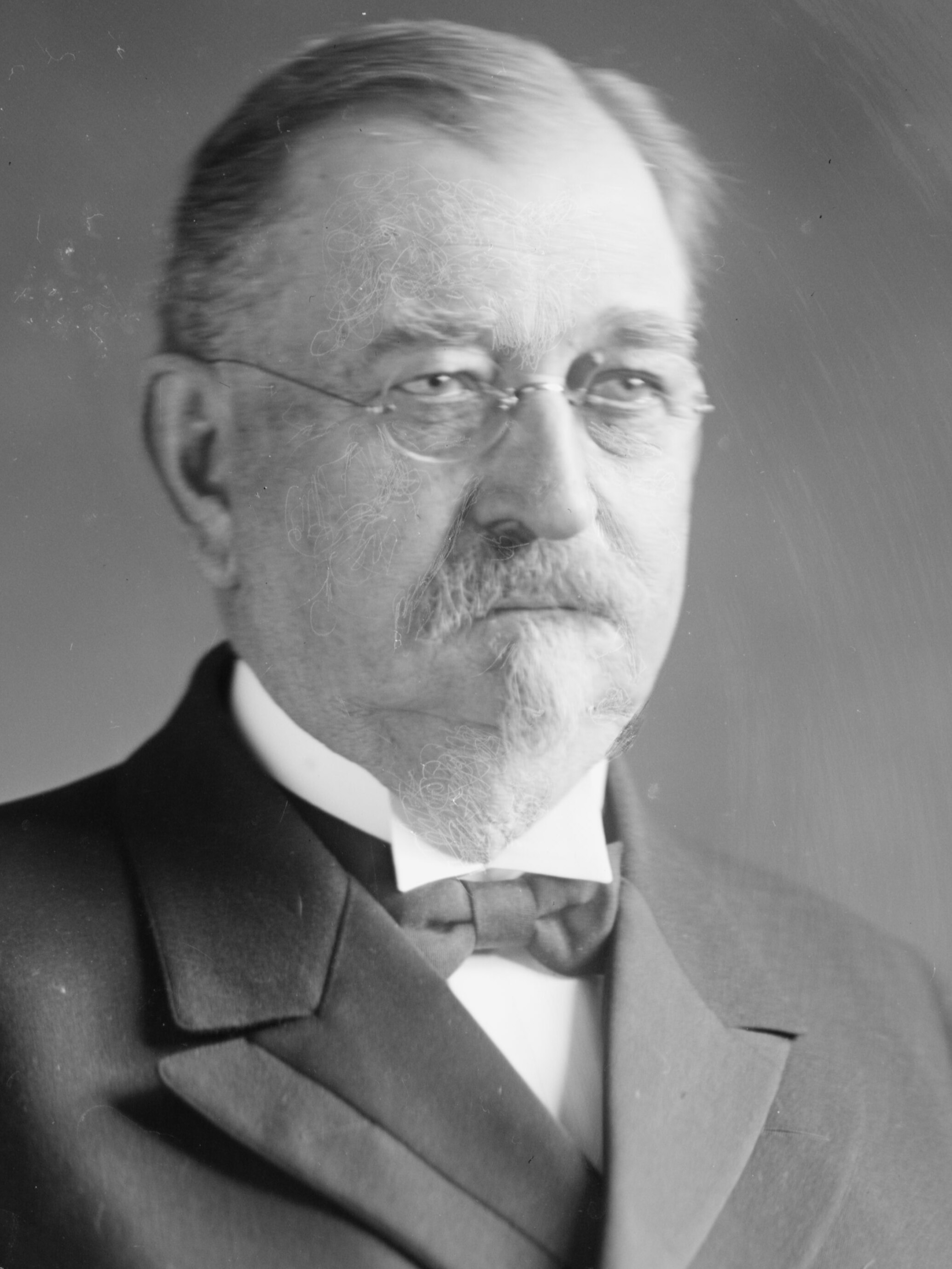

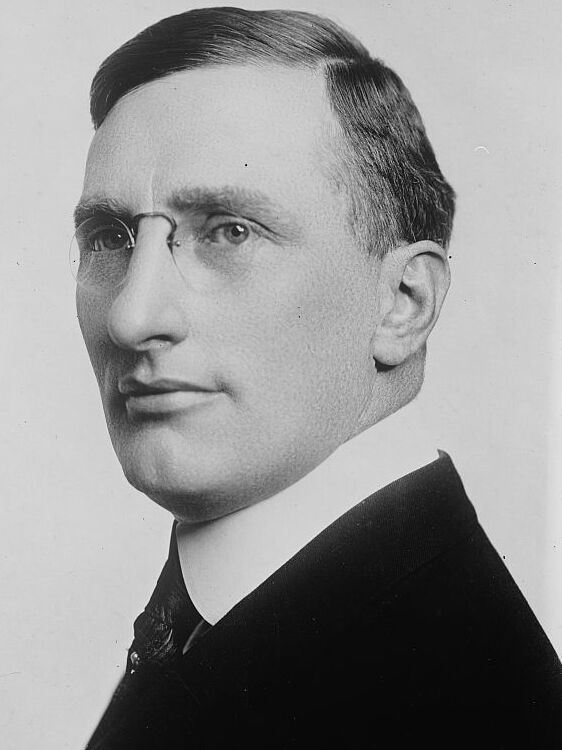
Nominee	Marcus H. Holcomb	Thomas J. Spellacy
Party	Republican	Democratic
Popular vote	84,891	76,773
Percentage	50.72%	45.87%
- Holcomb: 40–50% 50–60% 60–70% 70–80% 80–90% >90% Spellacy: 40–50% 50–60% 60–70%
Governor before election
Marcus H. Holcomb
Republican
Elected Governor
Marcus H. Holcomb
Republican

The 1918 Connecticut gubernatorial election was held on November 5, 1918. Incumbent Republican Marcus H. Holcomb defeated Democratic nominee Thomas J. Spellacy with 50.72% of the vote.

== General election ==
=== Candidates ===
Major party candidates

- Marcus H. Holcomb, Republican
- Thomas J. Spellacy, Democratic

Other candidates

- Michael Delphia, Independent
- Herman Klawansky, Socialist Labor
- John Newton Lackey, Prohibition
- George A. Parsons, Independent
- Martin F. Plunkett, Socialist

=== Results ===
1918 Connecticut gubernatorial election
Party	Candidate	Votes	%	±%
Republican	Marcus H. Holcomb (incumbent)	84,891	50.72%	
Democratic	Thomas J. Spellacy	76,773	45.87%	
Socialist	Martin F. Plunkett	4,001	2.39%	
Prohibition	John Newton Lackey	1,014	0.61%	
Socialist Labor	Herman Klawansky	560	0.34%	
Independent	George A. Parsons	121	0.07%	
Majority		8,118		
Turnout				
Republican hold		Swing		
