= Marcus H. Holcomb =

American politician (1844–1932)

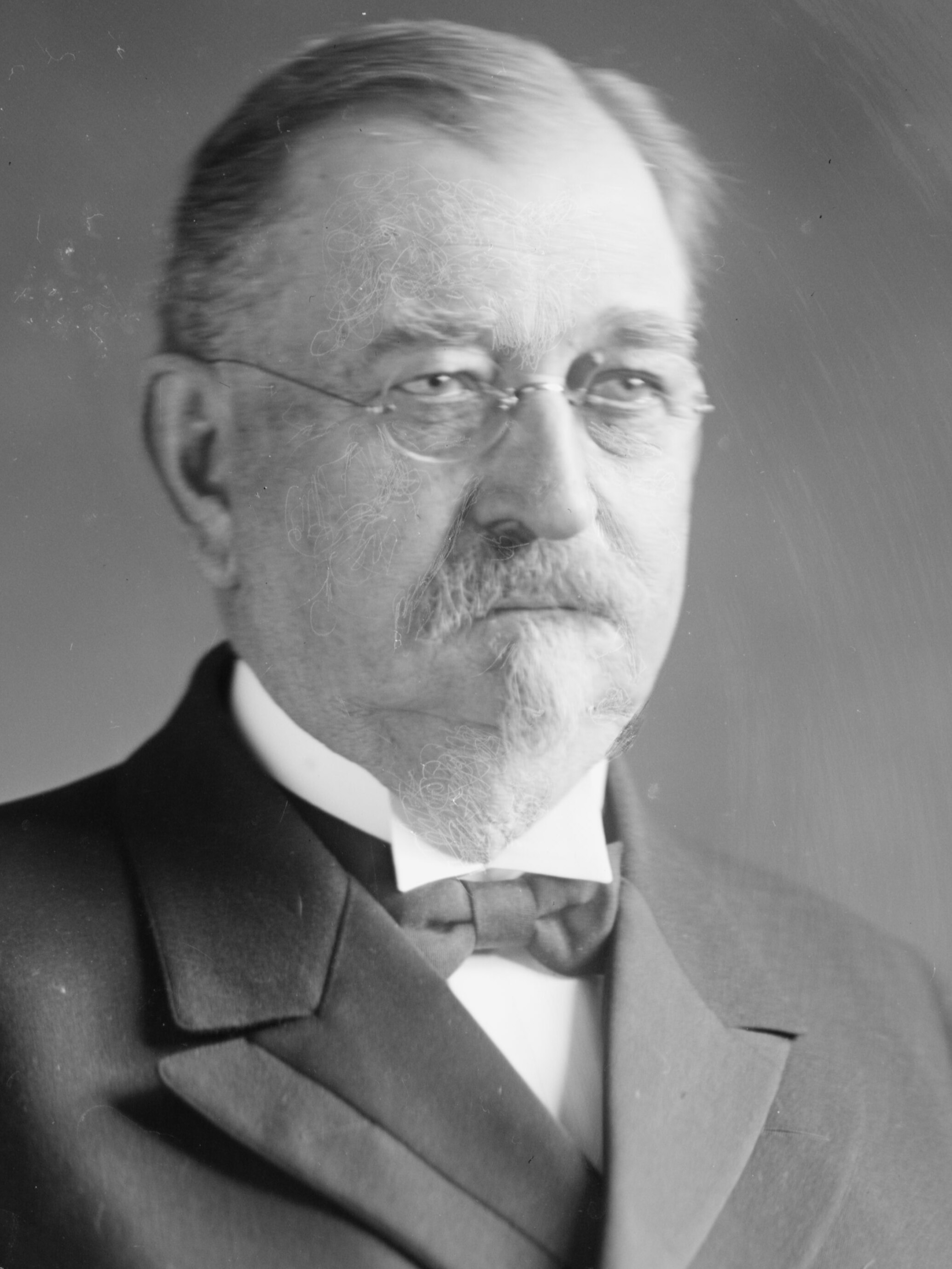

66th Governor of Connecticut
- In office January 6, 1915 – January 5, 1921
- Lieutenant: Clifford B. Wilson
- Preceded by: Simeon E. Baldwin
- Succeeded by: Everett J. Lake

Attorney General of Connecticut
- In office 1907–1910
- Governor: Rollin S. Woodruff; George L. Lilley; Frank B. Weeks
- Preceded by: William A. King
- Succeeded by: John H. Light

Member of the Connecticut Senate
- In office 1893-1894

Personal details
- Born: Marcus Hensey Holcomb; November 28, 1844 New Hartford, Connecticut, U.S.
- Died: March 5, 1932 (aged 87) Southington, Connecticut, U.S.
- Party: Republican
- Spouse: Sarah Carpenter Bennet Holcomb
- Children: Marcus Hensey Holcomb Jr.
- Profession: Lawyer, banker, politician

Marcus Hensey Holcomb (November 28, 1844 – March 5, 1932) was an American politician who served as the 66th governor of Connecticut, the attorney general of Connecticut, and as a member of the Connecticut Senate.

== Biography ==
Holcomb was born in New Hartford, Connecticut on November 28, 1844, son of Carlos Holcomb and Adah L. Bushnell, and a descendant of the immigrant Thomas Holcomb. He studied in the public school system New Hartford. He then studied at Wesleyan Seminary in Massachusetts. He was married to Sarah Carpenter Bennet on October 16, 1872. They had one son, Marcus Hensey Holcomb Jr., who died in infancy.

== Career ==
Holcomb taught school for a number of years, while studying law in the office of the Hon. Jared B. Foster; and was admitted to the bar in 1871. He was for thirty years president of the Southington Savings Bank and a director in the Southington Bank and Trust Company, the National Fire Insurance Company, and the Peck, Stow & Wilcox Company, the Aetna Nut Company, and the Southington Hardware Company.

While a judge of Southington's probate court from 1873 to 1910, Holcomb switched from Democratic Party to Republican in 1888. He was Hartford's treasurer from 1893 to 1908, a member of the Connecticut State Senate from 1893 to 1894. He was a delegate to Connecticut state constitutional convention, 1902; speaker of the Connecticut House of Representatives from 1905 to 1906, and Connecticut Attorney General from 1906 to 1907. He was Connecticut state attorney general from 1907 to 1910, and superior court judge in Connecticut from 1910 to 1915.

Becoming the Governor of Connecticut in 1915, Holcomb was reelected in 1916 and 1918. During his terms, the state of Connecticut prepared for the First World War. A food supply council and a state council of defense were established. Connecticut's debt was reduced and a bill was enacted that regulated maximum working hours for women. Teacher retirement benefits, old-age annuities, and health insurance programs also were instituted. However he became a storm center when he refused to convene the Connecticut Legislature to act on ratification of women's Suffrage Amendment to the US Constitution because of his personal opposition to it. He left office on January 5, 1921.

== Death and legacy ==
Holcomb died on March 5, 1932, aged 87 years, 98 days, in Southington, Connecticut. He is interred at Oak Hill Cemetery, Southington, Connecticut.

Holcomb's former home at 76 Main St., on the Green in downtown Southington, still stands. It is at present the site of the Southington Masonic Temple, Friendship Lodge #33, of which he was a past Secretary. The Holcomb School on Main Street in Southington was named in his honor when it opened in 1926. At the time it was the town's largest grammar school. It closed to students in 1974 and was converted into the headquarters of the town's police department in 1981. The building was razed in 2004.

The Marcus Holcomb Residence Hall, an all-female dormitory built in 1921 and located on the Storrs campus of the University of Connecticut, was named in his honor. Holcomb vetoed the bill that appropriated funds for construction of the dormitory, but ultimately signed the bill.

Party political offices
Preceded by J. P. Studley	Republican nominee for Governor of Connecticut; 1914, 1916, 1918	Succeeded by Everett J. Lake
Legal offices
Preceded by William A. King	Attorney General of Connecticut; 1907–1910	Succeeded by John H. Light
Political offices
Preceded by Simeon E. Baldwin	Governor of Connecticut; 1915–1921	Succeeded by Everett J. Lake
