= American Society for the Judicial Settlement of International Disputes =

The American Society for the Judicial Settlement of International Disputes was organization established in 1910 to promote the creation of a permanent international court. The Society was the forerunner of the League to Enforce Peace, which developed into the League of Nations concept and ultimately into the United Nations. The Society disbanded in 1916.

== History ==
The Society organized in Baltimore on the 6 February 1910, at the residence of Theodore Marburg. Composed mainly of influential judges, statesmen, and lawyers, the organization aimed for the creation of a permanent tribunal for the judicial settlement of international conflicts at The Hague. Additionally, the organization wanted to create the sentiment that the international controversies should be resolved by a permanent international court. The new court was intended not to replace the existing court of arbitration, but to supplement and strengthen it. The Society envisioned this court would be made of judges by profession which differed from the existing court at the Hague which was temporary and composed partly of judges and partly of diplomats and statesmen.

The society was supported by many influential politicians, diplomats, and legal professionals from across the United States and Canada. Among these were William Howard Taft, the organization's honorary president, Robert Borden, Alexander Graham Bell, Joseph Hodges Choate, James Brown Scott, Alexander Cameron Rutherford, Walter Scott, and Simeon E. Baldwin. "American Society for Judicial Settlement of International Disputes". William Lyon Mackenzie King : Primary series correspondence (J1), Fonds: William Lyon Mackenzie King, ID: 17331. Library Archives Canada.

The Society disbanded in 1916.
