= 1916 Connecticut gubernatorial election =

- November 7, 1916
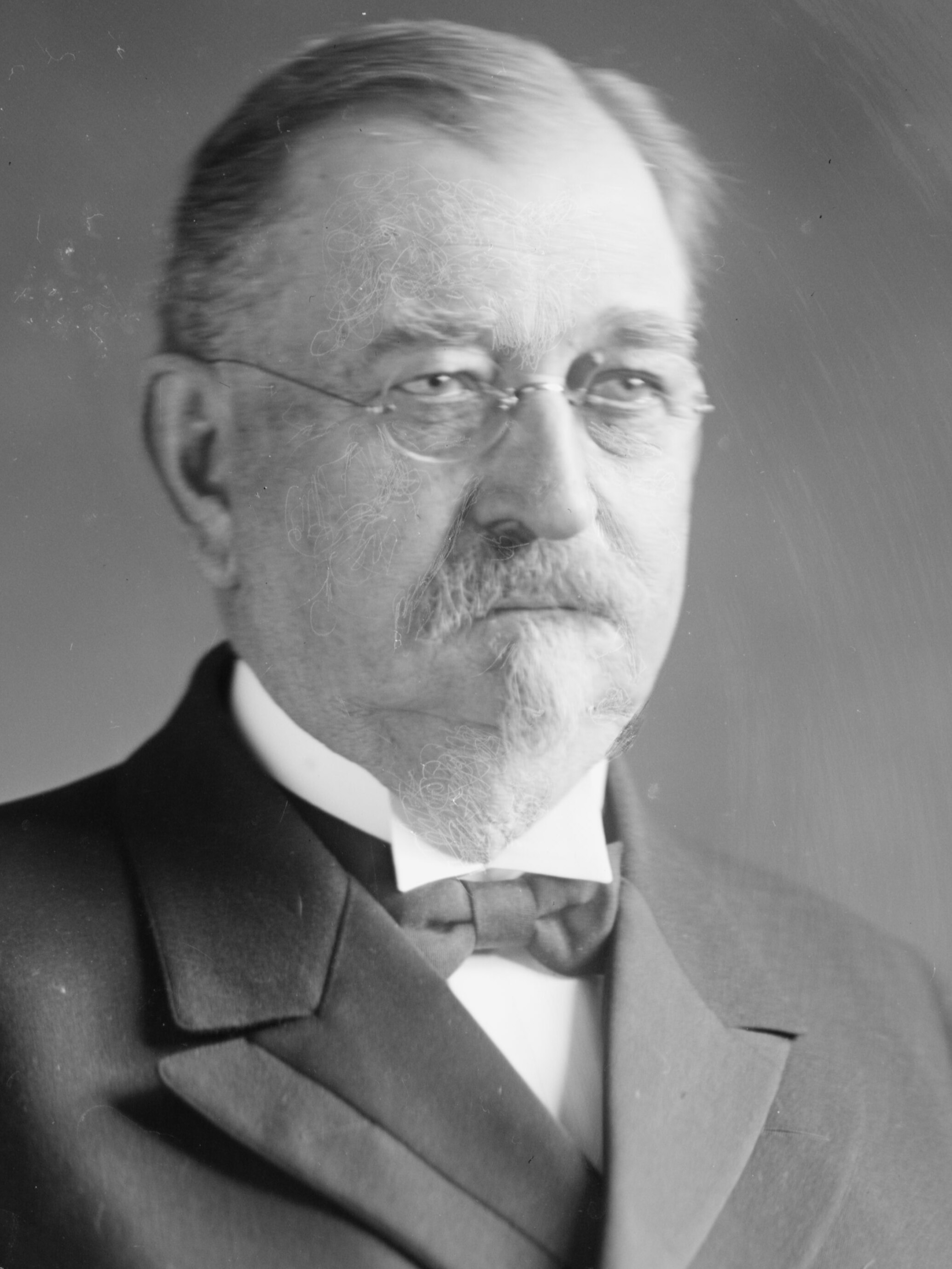

Nominee	Marcus H. Holcomb	Morris Beardsley
Party	Republican	Democratic
Popular vote	109,293	96,787
Percentage	51.12%	45.27%
- Holcomb: 40–50% 50–60% 60–70% 70–80% 80–90% Beardsley: 40–50% 50–60% 60–70%
Governor before election
Marcus H. Holcomb
Republican
Elected Governor
Marcus H. Holcomb
Republican

The 1916 Connecticut gubernatorial election was held on November 7, 1916. Incumbent Republican Marcus H. Holcomb defeated Democratic nominee Morris Beardsley with 51.12% of the vote.

== General election ==
=== Candidates ===
Major party candidates

- Marcus H. Holcomb, Republican
- Morris Beardsley, Democratic

Other candidates

- Herbert Beebe, Socialist
- G. Whitfield Simonson, Prohibition
- Charles B. Wells, Socialist Labor

=== Results ===
1916 Connecticut gubernatorial election
Party	Candidate	Votes	%	±%
Republican	Marcus H. Holcomb (incumbent)	109,293	51.12%	
Democratic	Morris Beardsley	96,787	45.27%	
Socialist	Herbert Beebe	5,300	2.48%	
Prohibition	G. Whitfield Simonson	1,803	0.84%	
Socialist Labor	Charles B. Wells	624	0.29%	
Majority		12,506		
Turnout				
Republican hold		Swing		
