= 1922 United States Senate election in Connecticut =

- November 7, 1922
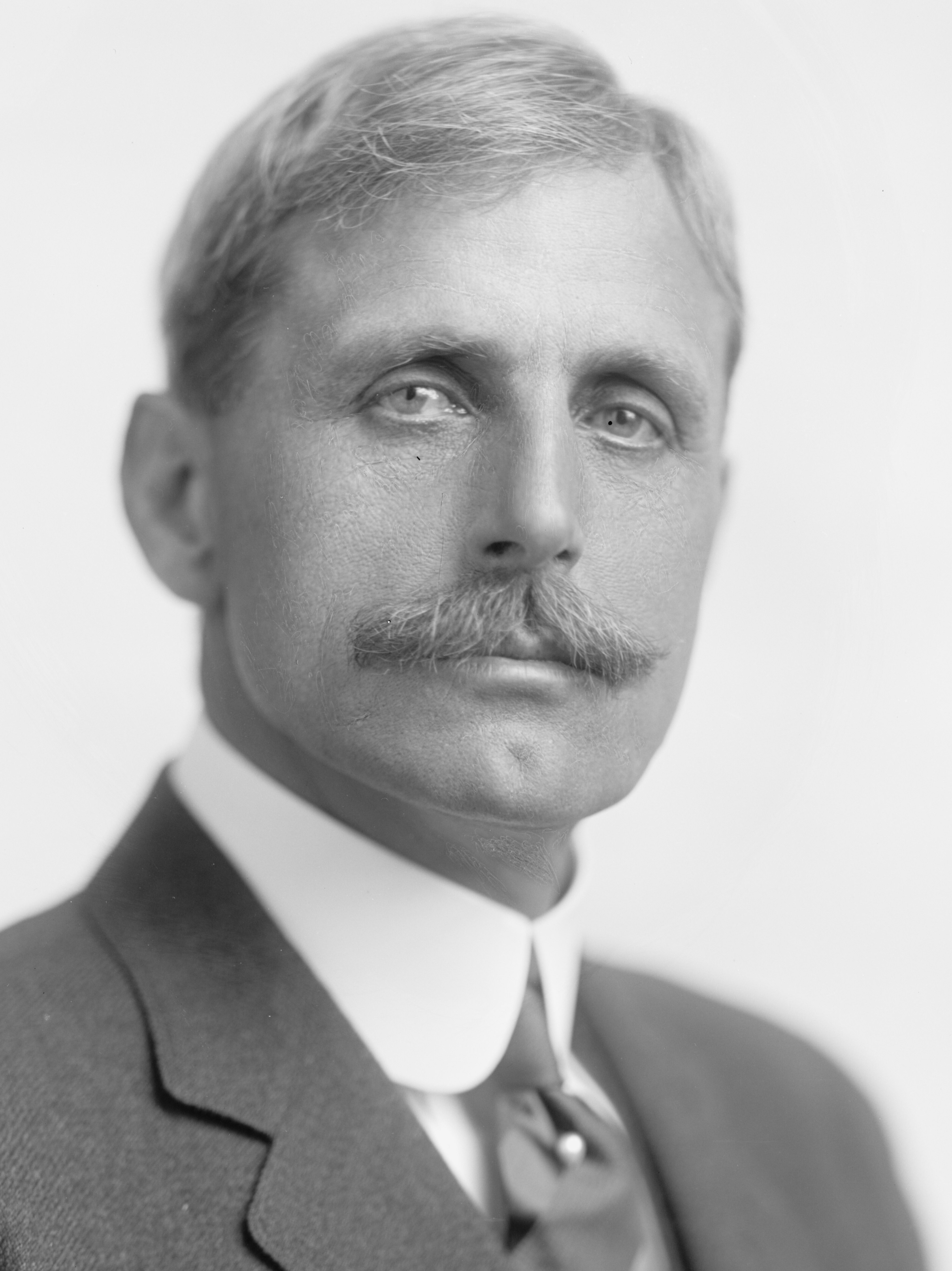

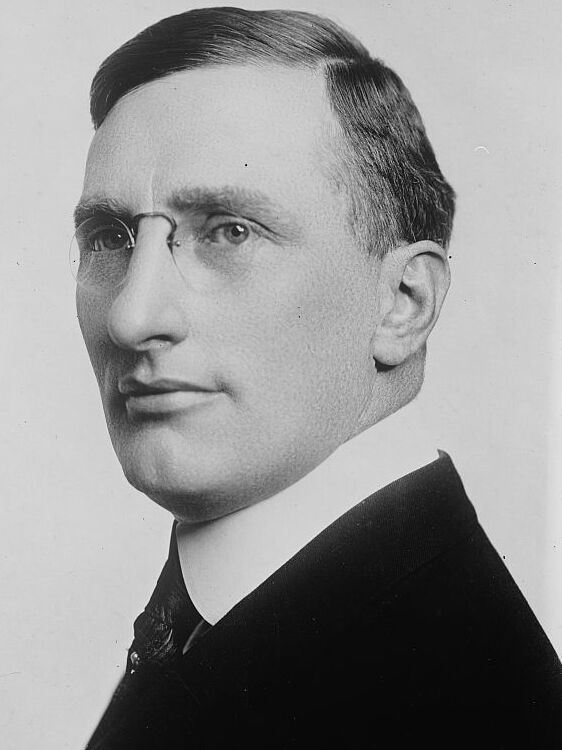
Nominee	George P. McLean	Thomas J. Spellacy
Party	Republican	Democratic
Popular vote	169,524	147,276
Percentage	52.34%	45.47%
- McLean: 40–50% 50–60% 60–70% 70–80% 80–90% 90–100% Spellacy: 40–50% 50–60% 60–70%
U.S. senator before election
George P. McLean
Republican
Elected U.S. Senator
George P. McLean
Republican

The 1922 United States Senate election in Connecticut was held on November 7, 1922. Incumbent Republican Senator George P. McLean was re-elected to a third term in office over Democratic attorney Thomas J. Spellacy.

== General election ==
=== Candidates ===
- George E. Carey (Independent)
- George P. McLean, incumbent Senator since 1911 (Republican)
- Isadore Polsky (Socialist and Farmer-Labor)
- Thomas J. Spellacy, Wall Street attorney and former State Senator from Hartford (Democratic)

=== Results ===
1922 U.S. Senate election in Connecticut
Party	Candidate	Votes	%	±%
Republican	George P. McLean (inc.)	169,524	52.34%	▲2.17
Democratic	Thomas J. Spellacy	147,276	45.47%	▼0.77
Socialist	Isadore Polsky	5,274	1.63%	▼0.85
Farmer–Labor	Isadore Polsky	887	0.27%	N/A
Total	Isadore Polsky	6,161	1.90%	N/A
Independent	George E. Carey	945	0.29%	N/A
Total votes		323,906	100.00%	
Republican hold				
