= Minotte E. Chatfield =

American politician (1859–1952)

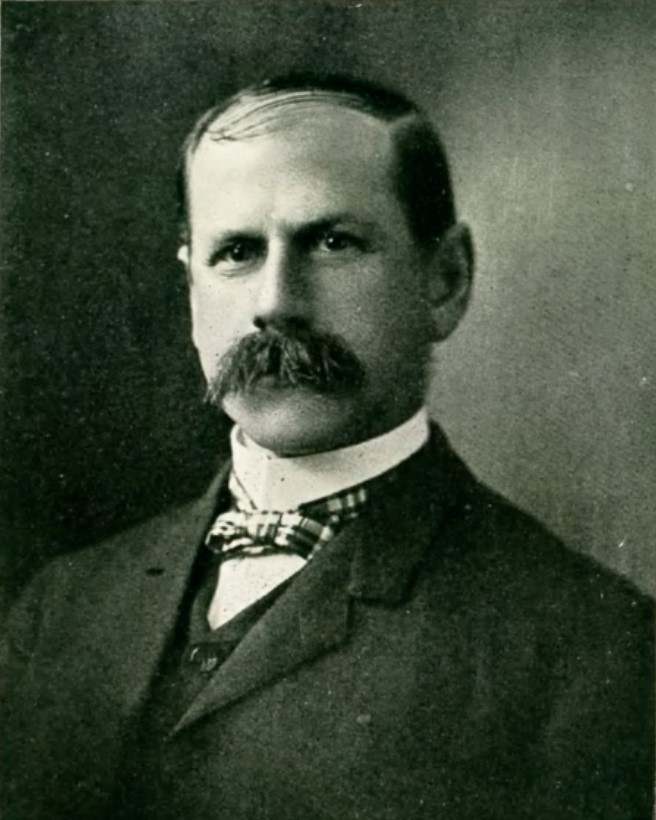
- Portrait of Chatfield, 1903

Member of the Connecticut State Senate from the 9th district
- In office January 4, 1905 – January 9, 1907
- Preceded by: Thomas Hamilton
- Succeeded by: Dennis A. Blakeslee

Member of the Connecticut House of Representatives from New Haven
- In office January 7, 1903 – January 4, 1905 Serving with Theodore Gruener
- Preceded by: Jerome F. Donovan
- Succeeded by: Frederick L. Lehr

Personal details
- Born: Minotte Estes Chatfield; March 13, 1859 Hamden, Connecticut, U.S.
- Died: August 19, 1952 (aged 93) Branford, Connecticut, U.S.
- Political party: Republican
- Spouses: Stella Stowe Russell (m. 1880; died 1916); Charlotte Thomas Snider (m. 1920; died 1947)
- Occupation: Businessman; politician

Minotte Estes Chatfield (March 13, 1859 – August 19, 1952) was an American businessman and politician, who served in both houses of the Connecticut General Assembly.
