= Eugen Huber =

Swiss jurist (1849–1923)

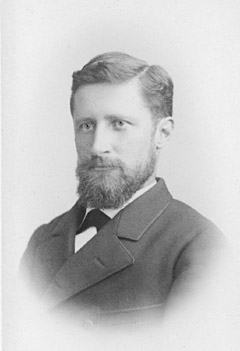
Eugen Huber

Eugen Huber (July 31, 1849 – April 23, 1923) was a Swiss jurist and the creator of the Swiss Civil code of 1907.

== Biography ==
Huber was born in the Swiss Canton of Zürich on July 31, 1849. His father was a physician. At the University of Zürich, Huber studied jurisprudence, where he received a doctorate in 1872 with a thesis on "The Swiss law of inheritance in its development since the separation of the Old Swiss Confederacy from the Holy Roman Empire." In 1875, he was a correspondent for a newspaper in Zürich until he replaced a judge in Appenzell from 1877 until 1880. In 1880, he became a professor of Swiss civil and federal law at the University of Basel and later, in 1888, he became a professor at Halle University in Halle and Wittenberg, where he taught legal history, private and commercial law, public land law as well as canon law and philosophy of law.

During this time, he began to write an extensive treatise on the private laws of the cantons, which was published in four volumes. In 1892, he was asked by the Swiss government to draft the Swiss civil code (Zivilgesetzbuch), which he completed in 1904. It was enacted in 1907 and entered into force in 1912. The Zivilgesetzbuch was applauded for being clear and modern, and it was later adopted in Turkey.

Huber was also a member of the Law Sources Commission of the Swiss Lawyers Society, which prepared the edition of the Collection of Swiss Law Sources.

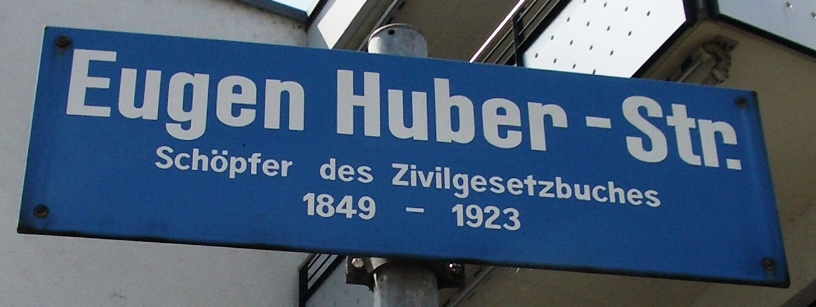
Eugen Huber-Strasse in Zürich-Altstetten

After 1908, he was a foreign correspondent of the first comparative law journal in the U.S., the Annual Bulletin of the Comparative Law Bureau of the American Bar Association.

Huber died in Bern on April 23, 1923, aged 73.
