= Jerome F. Donovan =

American politician (1872–1949)

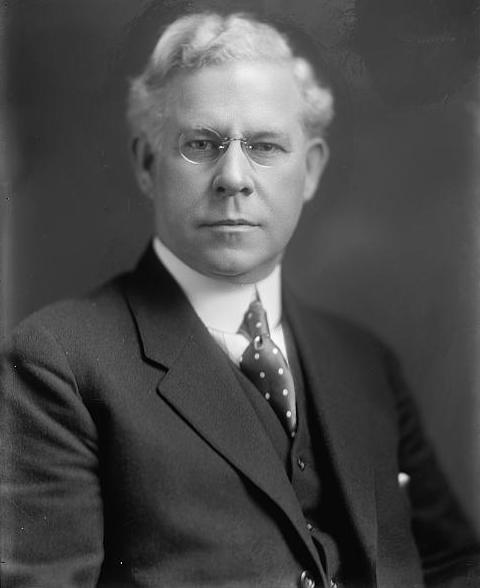

Member of the U.S. House of Representatives from New York's 21st district
- In office March 5, 1918 – March 3, 1921
- Preceded by: G. Murray Hulbert
- Succeeded by: Martin C. Ansorge

Member of the Connecticut House of Representatives from New Haven
- In office January 9, 1901 – January 7, 1903 Serving with L. W. Housel
- Preceded by: James P. Bree
- Succeeded by: Minotte E. Chatfield

Personal details
- Born: Jerome Francis Donovan; February 1, 1872 New Haven, Connecticut, U.S.
- Died: November 2, 1949 (aged 77) Stony Creek, Connecticut, U.S.
- Resting place: St. Bernard's Cemetery in New Haven
- Party: Democratic
- Education: Yale Law School (LLB)
- Occupation: Lawyer; politician

Military service
- Allegiance: Connecticut
- Branch/service: Connecticut National Guard
- Rank: Captain
- Unit: Company C, 2nd Regiment
- Battles/wars: Spanish–American War

Jerome Francis Donovan (February 1, 1872 – November 2, 1949) was an American lawyer and politician who served two terms as a United States representative from New York from 1918 to 1921.

== Early life ==
Jerome F. Donovan was born in New Haven, Connecticut on February 1, 1872. He attended the public schools, graduated from Yale Law School in 1894, was admitted to the bar and commenced practice in New Haven.

== Military career ==
Donovan joined the Connecticut Army National Guard for the Spanish–American War, and served as captain of Company C, 2nd Regiment from 1897 to 1903. Afterwards he was active in the United Spanish War Veterans.

== Political career ==
A Democrat, Donovan was a member of the Connecticut House of Representatives from 1901 to 1903, and New Haven City Auditor from 1902 to 1904. From 1904 to 1906 he was Secretary of the New Haven Civil Service Commission.

Donovan moved to New York City in 1910 and continued to practice law. From 1911 to 1913 he served as a state Special Deputy Attorney General.

=== Congress ===
In 1918 he was elected to the 65th Congress in a special election to fill the vacancy caused by the resignation of George Murray Hulbert. Later in 1918 he was elected to a full term in the 66th Congress, and he served in the House from March 5, 1918, to March 4, 1921. He was an unsuccessful candidate for reelection in 1920.

=== Later career ===
From 1923 to 1924 Donovan served as Deputy Attorney General for the New York State Department of Labor. He then resumed the practice of law in New York City until retiring in 1936.

== Death ==
In retirement Donovan resided in Stony Creek, Connecticut, where he died on November 2, 1949, and was buried at St. Bernard's Cemetery in New Haven.

U.S. House of Representatives
Preceded by George Murray Hulbert	Member of the U.S. House of Representatives from New York's 21st congressional district 1918–1921	Succeeded by Martin C. Ansorge
