= Simeon E. Baldwin =

American politician and judge (1840–1927)

- Baldwin, c. 1905–1927

65th Governor of Connecticut
- In office January 4, 1911 – January 6, 1915
- Lieutenant: Dennis A. Blakeslee; Lyman T. Tingier
- Preceded by: Frank B. Weeks
- Succeeded by: Marcus H. Holcomb

Chief Justice of the Connecticut Supreme Court of Errors
- In office 1907–1910
- Appointed by: Rollin S. Woodruff
- Preceded by: David Torrance
- Succeeded by: Frederic B. Hall

Personal details
- Born: Simeon Eben Baldwin; February 5, 1840 New Haven, Connecticut, US
- Died: January 30, 1927 (aged 86)
- Party: Democratic
- Parents: Roger Sherman Baldwin; Emily Perkins Baldwin
- Education: Yale College

Simeon Eben Baldwin (February 5, 1840 – January 30, 1927) was an American jurist, law professor, and politician who served as the 65th governor of Connecticut.

== Education ==
The son of jurist, Connecticut governor and U.S. Senator Roger Sherman Baldwin and Emily Pitkin Perkins, Baldwin was born and lived for much of his life in New Haven, Connecticut, and was one of nine children. Among his ancestors were the initial five governors of the Connecticut Colony. Another ancestor was Roger Sherman, a signatory to the Declaration of Independence. His father had served from 1844 to 1846 as the governor of Connecticut.

As a boy he attended the Hopkins Grammar School in New Haven, Connecticut. Active in all its alumni work, he was, more specifically, for many years president of its board of trustees; in 1910, on the occasion of the two hundred and fiftieth anniversary of the founding of the school, he delivered a discourse on its history; when shortly before his death it became necessary to house the school in new quarters, he was one of the largest, if not the largest, of the individual donors whose contributions made possible a set of modern buildings for what he was fond of referring to as the fourth oldest institution of learning in the United States.

From the Hopkins Grammar School he went to Yale College, from which he was graduated with the class of 1861. There is scant information as to his four years at college. During that period he kept a diary from which he read extracts on the fifty-fifth reunion of his class, but this diary is not at present available. That the studious traits which he later manifested were not altogether lacking at this time may be inferred from the fact that he was elected a member of Phi Beta Kappa and Skull & Bones. Such records as we have do not indicate that there was anything unusual about this young student who had among his classroom contemporaries the poet Edward Rowland Sill, and two others who like himself were later to have much to do with the life of the university, his friends Tracy Peck and Franklin Bowditch Dexter.

== Early years ==
For the two years following his graduation from college he studied law at Yale, at Harvard, and in his father's office. In 1863 he was admitted to the bar and began the practice of law. His seventeen years of service as an associate justice and chief justice of the supreme court of Connecticute state and his four years as governor in the latter part of his life, may have obscured for his later contemporaries the fact that he was also a successful lawyer. In the practice of the law he won distinction both in his own state and outside, and with it the financial emoluments that usually accompany success at the bar. He was keenly alive to the practical side of the lawyer's work and never lost his zest for it. Till almost the very end of his life he maintained a law office, which he visited daily as long as his health would permit, and kept adding to his law library. As late as 1919 his book The Young Man and the Law revealed him still at heart a lawyer. In 1878, he was one of the founders of the American Bar Association and served as president of the American Bar Association from 1890 to 1891.

During the middle portion of his life he was actively engaged in teaching law. Here also he showed ability. One who studied law under him and like him became chief justice of the supreme court of errors of Connecticut says that his old pupils regard his work as a teacher "as more distinctive and weightier in influence upon human life than any other portion of his work. Probably in his day not a half dozen teachers of the law in our country could be placed in his class" (American Bar Association Journal, February 1927, p. 74).

From 1897 to 1910, Baldwin was a member of the Connecticut State Supreme Court, where he presided as chief justice from 1907 to 1910.

For twelve years (1907–1919) he was the director of the American Bar Association's Comparative Law Bureau (as well as its Annual Bulletin's editor for general jurisprudence).

To the same effect may be interpreted the action of the Association of American Law Schools, which in 1902 elected him its president. In 1869 he was appointed as a professor of law to the faculty of the Yale Law School, then in a moribund condition. His active participation in the affairs of that school was to continue for just fifty years, for it was not until 1919 that he retired as professor emeritus. The revival of the law school was largely his work. He increased the size of the faculty, instituted new courses, developed graduate work, and for a long time carried much of the financial responsibility for the school's existence (Yale Law Journal, March 1927, p. 680). It was characteristic of him that when shortly before his retirement the method of teaching was changed to the so-called "case system," to which Judge Baldwin, like most of his contemporaries, objected, he never for an instant changed his attitude of loyalty to the school, which some years later was to be most generously remembered in his will.

Following four years of research, he released Baldwin's Connecticut Digest in 1871, which supported Connecticut attorneys with their research and also brought clients to his own legal practice. The same year, he became legal counsel to the New York and New England Railroad, and by the mid-1880s, he was a leading railroad and business attorney.

In addition to his work as lawyer and teacher he took an active part in the public affairs of New Haven. He served on the Public Parks commission, on the New Haven common council, and on the board of directors of the New Haven Hospital. Deeply interested in religious work, he was president of the New Haven Congregational Club and of the YMCA. From 1884 until 1896 he was president of the New Haven Colony Historical Society, for which he wrote many papers mostly on subjects of history.

== Political life ==
Even more diversified than his activities in local affairs was his participation in those that concerned the state as a whole. Never a politician, and to the end of his days allowing such honors and offices as came to him to come unsought and unfought for, he nevertheless early became identified with the political life of his state. Starting as a Republican, he was nominated for state senator from the fourth district in 1867, but was not elected. In 1884 he was one of the "independents" who refused to support James G. Blaine, and was chosen president of the Republican organization in Connecticut.

The greatest of his political honors came to him when he was an old man. Automatically retired from the position of chief justice of the supreme court, February 5, 1910, because he had reached the age limit of seventy years, he that year was nominated for governor on the Democratic ticket and was elected the governor of Connecticut.

In June 1912, at the Democratic National Convention he received twenty votes for the presidential nomination. In November of the same year he was elected the governor of Connecticut, nominally strongly Republican, for a second term of two years. Both the Corrupt Practices Act and a civil service law instituting a merit system for state employees were enacted during his administration, along with numerous laws affecting working conditions.

He was Democratic candidate for United States senator from Connecticut for the term beginning March 4, 1915. Caught in a Republican landslide and defeated by incumbent Senator Frank B. Brandegee, he nevertheless ran ahead of his party ticket by several thousand votes.

It was inevitable that the high regard in which he was held as a lawyer should lead to his being named on various state commissions of reform. In 1872, less than a decade after he began to practice law, the Connecticut legislature elected him one of a commission of five that made the Revision of 1875, the General Statutes of the State of Connecticut. In the same year he was a member of a state commission appointed to revise the education laws. Six years later he was named by the governor of Connecticut acting under a resolution of the state legislature one of a commission of five to inquire into the feasibility of simplifying legal procedure. This commission drew up a set of rules and forms which were approved and adopted by the court as the basis of pleading in civil cases.

In 1886 a commission was appointed to report on a better system of state taxation. He was a member of that commission and drew the report. Again in 1915-17 he was chairman of a commission established by the State to revise its system of taxation. But his participation in state affairs was not merely political and legal; he was also actively associated with charitable and religious organizations. At one time or another he was a director of the General Hospital Society of Connecticut and a director of the Missionary Society of Connecticut; he served as moderator of the General Conference of Congregational Churches of Connecticut, and he was a delegate of the Congregational Churches to the national council.

His scholarship and his interest in questions of the day led him into affiliations with many of the learned societies. Nor were these affiliations perfunctory only. He regularly attended the society meetings, wrote papers for them, and rose to the highest places in their councils. He was president of the American Social Science Association (1897), International Law Association (1899), American Historical Association (1905), Political Science Association (1910), American Society for the Judicial Settlement of International Disputes (1911), Connecticut Academy of Arts and Sciences, Connecticut Society of the Archaeological Institute of America (1914). He was vice-president of the Archaeological Institute of America (1898) and of the social and economic science section of the American Association for the Advancement of Science (1903). He was an associate of the Institute of International Law. He was elected a Fellow of the American Academy of Arts and Sciences in 1912. He was a member also of the National Institute of Arts and Sciences, American Philosophical Society, elected a member of the American Antiquarian Society in 1893, and a corresponding member of the Massachusetts Historical Society, Colonial Society of Massachusetts, and L'Institut de Droit Comparé. Baldwin was among the incorporators of Connecticut College at its founding in 1911, and he served on its board of trustees through 1924.

His connections with national and international matters touching law and its ramifications were not restricted to membership in learned societies. In 1899 he was appointed by the State Department a delegate from the United States to the Sixth International Prison Congress, which met the next year at Brussels. Again in 1905 he was United States delegate to a similar congress held at Budapest and was made its vice-president. At this congress he presented his report on the question "By what principles and in what manner may convicts be given work in the fields, or other public work in open air?" In 1904, appointed by President Roosevelt one of the delegates to represent the United States, he was elected vice-president of the Universal Congress of Lawyers and Jurists held in connection with the St. Louis Exposition of that year.

His writings cover a number of fields. Among his more pretentious works are: A Digest of All the Reported Cases... of Conn. (2 vols., 1871, 1882), The historic policy of the United States as to annexation. (New Haven: Hoggson & Robinson, 1893), Cases on Railroad Law (1896), Modern Political Institutions (1898), American Railroad Law (1904), The American Judiciary (1905), The Relations of Education to Citizenship (1912), Life and Letters of Simeon Baldwin (1919), The Young Man and the Law (1919). He was a most prolific writer of articles and pamphlets. Some ten years before his death he collected and presented to the Yale Law School nearly a hundred of these in four bound volumes which he entitled in order of numbering: Law and Law Reform, Studies in History, International and Constitutional Law, and Studies in Legal Education and Social Sciences. While these titles very aptly classify his literary output the volumes themselves do not contain all his miscellaneous publications.

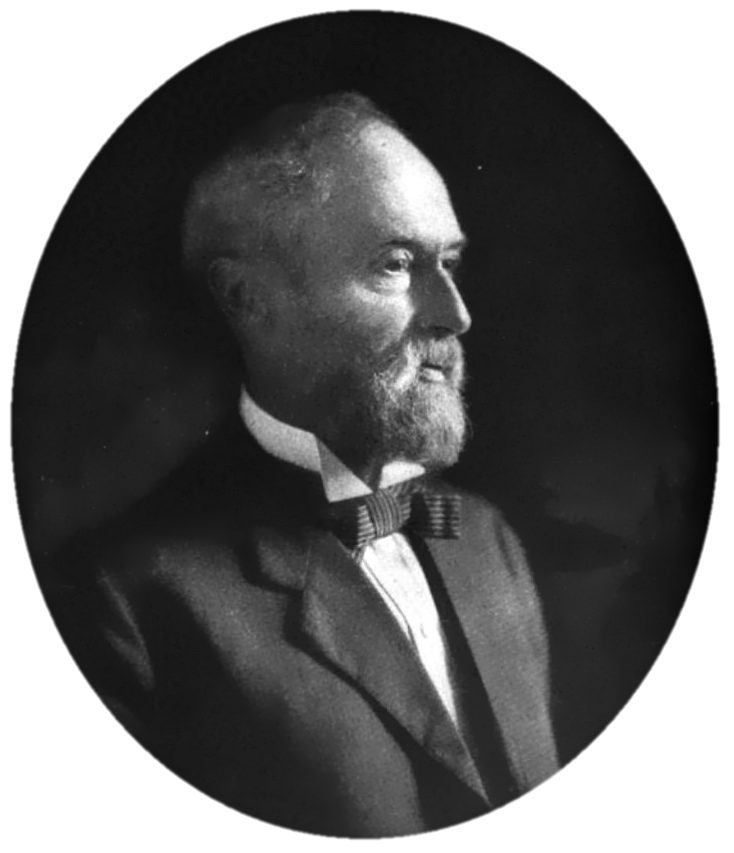
Baldwin circa 1910.

He was not above medium height, somewhat slight of figure and seemingly frail in physique, though this frailty was in appearance only as he was a man of tremendous, tireless energy. Although in no sense athletic, he made some sort of exercise in the open air each day almost a religious duty. At one time this took the form of bicycle rides, though he soon gave these up in favor of walking. His rule was to cover at least four miles a day, rain or shine, and there was no part of the less congested portions of New Haven and its environs over which he had not many times traveled as he walked unhurriedly alone, stooping somewhat, buried in thought, compelled by poor eyesight to keep his gaze fixed upon his path a few feet ahead of him. This methodical exercise he kept up until, in his last years, injuries received as the result of a fall confined him to his home.

His personality, externally at least, was cold, dignified, and grave. Some of those who knew him best say that he was in reality warm-hearted but the characteristics that made an impression on every one were his reserve and his austerity; in general he was an object of respect rather than of affection; he had none of the weaknesses that make men lovable. As deeply religious as any of his Puritan ancestors, he was most broadly tolerant of the beliefs of others. His conception of civic duty was Roman, but he was ever willing to oppose even the State in defending what he regarded as the constitutional and legal rights of the individual. He was frugal to such a degree that on one occasion when traveling as governor with his staff, instead of partaking of a sumptuous dinner in a dining car specially provided for them, he rode in a coach and ate a sandwich which he had brought from home. With this frugality he combined a generosity even more marked. Part of his life was lived in the days of high hats. Such hats, when they became old, were usually donated to the missionaries. To quote from one who for many years served with Judge Baldwin on the committee of a missionary society, "He used to turn in his old high hat at the shop for fifteen cents, but he would give $1,500 to the committee for missions." He was unyielding where a principle was involved; but in matters of mere policy he had the remarkable ability, once he was outvoted, to make the policy of the majority his own even though he had strenuously opposed it.

Quiet and unassuming in manner he could be aggressive when he deemed it necessary, as he did in his controversy with Roosevelt when the latter dared to ridicule his ability as a judge. Prompt and unfailing in meeting appointments, unimportant though they might be, he demanded the same consideration from others, even refusing to wait for dinner guests who might be late. Both by nature and training he was conservative, but not reactionary; his mind was open as well as active. If his plea for castration and whipping as generally applicable methods of punishing criminals savors of the archaic (Yale Law Journal, June 1899), he was capable also of starting nationwide comment, as on the radically new ideas embodied in his "The Natural Right to a Natural Death" (Journal of Social Science, 1889).

In January 1910 he published "The Law of the Airship" (American Journal of International Law), and in November "Liability for Accidents in Aerial Navigation" (Michigan Law Review, IX, 20). At his suggestion the Connecticut legislature (1911) passed a law regulating the use of flying machines, the first law to be enacted on this subject. France shortly afterward modeled her law on that of Connecticut.

In 1911 he had two articles on airship law in foreign journals (Revue de l'Institut de Droit Comparé and Zeitschrift für Völkerrecht und Bundesstaatsrecht). Notwithstanding his work in many fields, his real interest was always in modern law. He has been called an antiquarian, but his studies in this line did not go beyond colonial history, more particularly Connecticut history. Few men have played a more important part in so many activities that concerned their own community. When he was presented for the degree of LL.D. at the Yale Commencement in 1916 he was called, inter alia, "the first citizen of Connecticut." No designation could have fitted him better. ―George Edward Woodbine

== Personal life ==
He was the son of Roger Sherman Baldwin, brother-in-law of Dwight Foster (1828–1884), uncle of Edward Baldwin Whitney, grandson of Simeon Baldwin, and the great-grandson of Roger Sherman.

On 19 October 1865 he married Susan Mears Winchester, daughter of Edmund Winchester and Harriet Mears. Simeon and Susan had three children: Florence, Roger and Helen. In 1873, Susan was admitted to a mental health institution after developing a mental disorder subsequent to the demise of their daughter Florence in 1872. Her sister Charlotte assisted in the upbringing of the two remaining children, Roger and Helen, and oversaw the household.

He died January 30, 1927, in New Haven.

== Notes ==
Good likenesses of Baldwin in his later years in American Bar Association Journal, February 1927, p. 73, and in Yale Alumni Weekly, February 11, 1927, p. 555; for an estimate of the man and his achievements see the articles accompanying these and also Yale Law Journal, March 1927, p. 680; New Haven Journal-Courier, Hartford Times, Hartford Courant, January 31, February 1, 2, 1927; Who's Who in America, 1899–1927.

There is a complete list of his writings in Yale University Library; partial lists, together with considerable biog. material, are given in the records of the class of 1861, Yale College, published by the class secretary, especially those for the years 1888, 1903, 1907, 1916.

His legal bibliography, fairly complete through 1901, was printed in Yale Law Journal, November 1901, pp. 14–16. His opinions and decisions written while he was on the bench will be found in Conn. Reports, volumes LXIII-LXXXIII. For the facts in regard to his controversy with Roosevelt, see Outlook, volume XCVII, Jan. 1911, pp. 240–244.

== See also ==
- American Bar Association
- American Social Science Association
- Comparative Law Bureau
- Connecticut College
- International Law Association

Party political offices
Preceded by A. Heaton Richardson	Democratic nominee for Governor of Connecticut; 1910, 1912	Succeeded by Lyman T. Tingier
First	Democratic nominee for U.S. Senator from Connecticut (Class 3); 1914	Succeeded by Augustine Lonergan
Political offices
Preceded by Frank B. Weeks	Governor of Connecticut; 1911–1915	Succeeded by Marcus H. Holcomb
