= John Henry Wigmore =

American legal scholar (1863–1943)

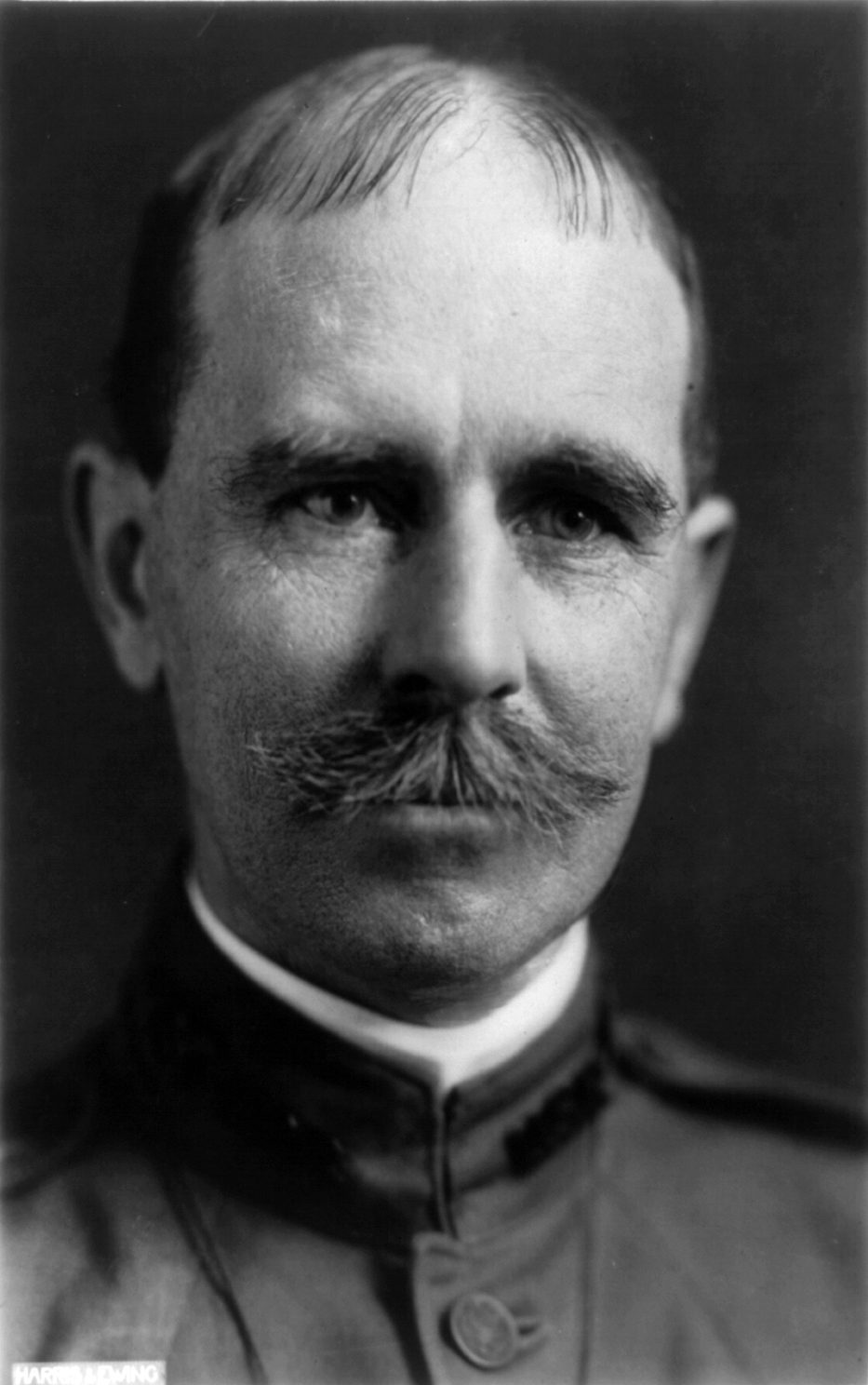
- Born: March 4, 1863; San Francisco, California, U.S.
- Died: April 20, 1943 (aged 80); Chicago, Illinois, U.S.
- Burial place: Arlington National Cemetery
- Education: Harvard University (AB, AM, LLB)
- Occupation: Jurist
- Known for: Dean of Northwestern Law School, Wigmore on Evidence, Wigmore chart, American Association of University Professors
- Spouse: Emma Hunt Vogl (married 1889-1943)

John Henry Wigmore (1863–1943) was an American lawyer and legal scholar known for his expertise in the law of evidence and for his influential scholarship. Wigmore taught law at Keio University in Tokyo (1889–1892) before becoming the first full-time dean of Northwestern Law School (1901–1929). His scholarship is best remembered for his Treatise on the Anglo-American System of Evidence in Trials at Common Law (1904), often simply called Wigmore on Evidence, and a graphical analysis method known as a Wigmore chart. He served as the second president of the American Association of University Professors.

== Personal life and education ==
John Henry Wigmore was born in San Francisco on March 4, 1863. His parents were John and Harriet Joyner Wigmore. He was named after his father, a self-made lumberyard owner. He was the second-oldest child of thirteen.

Wigmore attended Harvard University and earned the degrees A.B. in 1883 and A.M. in 1884. Following his undergraduate work, he returned to San Francisco briefly, but then moved back to Cambridge to attend Harvard Law School where he received his LL.B. in 1887.

Following law school, Wigmore's parents expected him to return to San Francisco to run the family business. Wigmore instead elected to stay in Boston, causing a rift to develop between himself and his parents. Wigmore married Emma Hunt Vogl (b. July 26, 1860, d. 1943) of Cambridge, whom he had met during law school, in September 1889. His parents did not attend the wedding. The couple departed for Tokyo just three days after their wedding.

== Career ==
Following his graduation from Harvard, Wigmore practiced law in Boston. While in practice, he served as a "long-distance clerk" for New Hampshire Supreme Court Chief Justice Charles Doe and was mentored by future US Supreme Court Justice Louis Brandeis. Election law reform issues including the secret voting method (also known as the Australian Ballot), and fair ballot access laws.

=== Keio University and comparative law ===
In 1889, Wigmore was recruited as a foreign advisor to Meiji period Empire of Japan, and was assigned to teach law at Keio University in Tokyo. Wigmore was the only full-time professor at the university at the time and was "instrumental" in designing the law curriculum. He served at Keio University until 1892.

Once he arrived in Tokyo he "came under the spell of what is called Comparative Law", although his interest pre-dated his experiences in Japan. A key legacy of his time in Japan was a detailed study of the laws of the Tokugawa shogunate in Edo period Japan, which he edited and published as a series of papers while at Keio University. The collection of papers grew to 15 volumes under the collected title of Materials for the Study of Private Law in Old Japan before its completion in the mid-1930s.

Wigmore maintained his interest in comparative law for the rest of his life, becoming a prominent writer in the field and has been referred to as the "father of American comparative law", although some critics found his work "imaginary" and "needlessly uncritical". Despite his prominence, he is remembered more for popularizing the field of comparative law than for his scholarly contributions to it. His continuing fascination with similarities between legal systems around the world is evident in a 1932 article: "The legal profession throughout the world has the strongest ties that ought to bind, - ties of sentiment, ties of public duty, ties of common experience in human nature."

He was also a manager of the 1907-founded Comparative Law Bureau of the American Bar Association, whose Annual Bulletin was the first comparative law journal in the United States.

=== American Association of University Professors ===
Wigmore's interests in procedure and due process extended to his life in academia. He was a prominent member and officer of the American Association of University Professors. In addition to serving as the second president from 1916 to 1917, Wigmore wrote publicly on behalf of academic freedom as comparable to "judicial immunity"; appointed standing committees; developed procedures for AAUP investigation of academic dismissal; and initiated the establishment of local AAUP chapters and of regular publication of AAUP proceedings in the Bulletin.

=== Northwestern University Law School ===
Wigmore accepted a teaching post at Northwestern University and returned to the United States in 1893. He taught torts, comparative law, and evidence. He became the first full-time dean of Northwestern Law School in 1901. In 1906, Wigmore helped establish the Northwestern University Law Review, which was a faculty-run publication in the early days.

During his career at Northwestern, Wigmore "transformed a relatively modest institution into one of the leading law schools in the United States." As a result of his successes, he was actively recruited by rival institutions including Yale and Columbia. Nevertheless, he remained dedicated to Northwestern.

In 1926, a 37-note carillon was commissioned and installed at the Law School. Now known as the "Wigmore Chimes," the carillon plays the "Counselor's Chorus," a song written by Wigmore for the Law School.

Wigmore served as Dean of Northwestern Law until 1929. Following his deanship, he remained a professor at the Law School taking emeritus status in 1934. He continued his work at Northwestern until his death on April 20, 1943 in a "freakish" taxi accident. His widow, Emma, died just four months later.

Wigmore continues to be honored by the university: he is the namesake of a prominent alumni club and the annual student-run "Law School musical" is called the Wigmore Follies.

== Military service ==
In 1915, General Enoch Crowder, the Judge Advocate General of the Army, asked Wigmore to become a reserve officer. Following the United States’ declaration of war on Germany, Wigmore was activated to duty as a major serving with the Judge Advocate General's Office in Washington DC. By 1918 he was promoted colonel. His wartime duties included advising the War Department on labor law, liability for patent infringements on German pharmaceuticals, and the law of war. He also had a significant role in the drafting of the Selective Service Act of 1917 and the Espionage Act. At the conclusion of the war, he sided with Crowder over General Samuel Ansell who insisted that courts-martial were in need of reform.

Wigmore's legacy is made apparent in a 1917 U.S. Army Military Law manual which credits the chapters on 'Evidence' to "the assistance of Prof. Wigmore of Northwestern University, recently commissioned a major and judge advocate in the Officers' Reserve Corps."

Following his military service, Wigmore's preferred mode of address became "Colonel" and remained so for the rest of his life.

== Writings and scholarship ==
Wigmore's high productivity as a writer was noted by his contemporaries. In examining his life's work, one biographer calculated that "[t]he sheer magnitude of [his] achievement is [...] more than 18 feet of shelf space or an entire section of standard library shelving." consisting of over 900 books and other works. In 1943, the Association of American Law Schools claimed "no great law writer or even any great novelist, such as Scott or Dumas, ... appears to match Dean Wigmore in the volume of published achievement."

=== Wigmore on Evidence ===
In 1904 Wigmore began publication of his most famous work, a treatise that would serve as an encyclopedic survey of the development of the law of evidence. This massive work, referred to as Wigmore on Evidence or just Wigmore (see § Select works for edition titles), was the product of "10 years of monastic toil." Over the course of the next forty years, the initial four-volume treatise would swell to ten volumes containing over 85,000 judicial citations. Contemporary reviews would declare the "sun of Evidence does pretty much 'rise and set in Wigmore'". Wigmore's peers called the Treatise "one of the greatest intellectual feats in law-writing of any age or any country." U.S. Supreme Court Justice Felix Frankfurter called the Treatise "unrivaled as the greatest treatise on any single subject of the law."

Wigmore on Evidence was probably the most "heavily cited law text of its day" and the dominant source of US evidentiary law up until the codification of the Federal Rules of Evidence in 1975. Wigmore was a strong advocate of a standard Code of Evidence and participated in a 1938 effort by the American Bar Association and the American Law Institute to produce a Model Code. This Model Code later became a basis for the Uniform Rules of Evidence drafted in the 1950s which was then used to help draft the Federal Rules of Evidence. Today the Federal Rules of Evidence have become the primary modern doctrinal basis for the law of evidence in US federal trials and serve as the basis on which many states have modeled their evidence rules.

== Select works ==
- 1891 – Notes on Land Tenure and Local Institutions in Old Japan: Posthumous Papers of D. B. Simmons (John Henry Wigmore, editor). Tokyo: Asiatic Society of Japan. [reprinted by University Publications of America, 1979. ISBN 978-0-89093-223-0; OCLC 5622796
- 1892 – Materials for the Study of Private Law in Old Japan. Tokyo: Asiatic Society of Japan. OCLC 26107737
- 1894 – Responsibility for Tortious Acts: Its History. III "Responsibility for Tortious Acts: Its History. III", Harvard Law Review, Vol. 7, No. 8, March 25, 1894, pp. 441–463
- 1976 – Law & Justice in Tokugawa Japan: Contract, Legal Precedents. New York: Columbia University Press. ISBN 978-0-86008-166-1
- 1985 – Law and Justice in Tokugawa Japan: Contract, Commercial Customary Law. Tokyo: University of Tokyo Press. ISBN 978-0-86008-375-7
- 1986 – Law and Justice in Tokugawa Japan: Materials for the History of Japanese Law and Justice Under the Tokugawa Shogunate 1603–1867. Tokyo: University of Tokyo Press. ISBN 978-0-86008-396-2

=== Treatise ===
- — (1904). A treatise on the system of evidence in trials at common law including the statutes and judicial decision of all jurisdictions of the United States. Boston: Little, Brown. LCCN 04027684. OCLC 911862732.
- — (1923). A treatise on the Anglo-American system of evidence in trials at common law, including the statutes and judicial decisions of all jurisdictions of the United States and Canada (2nd ed.). Boston: Little, Brown, and company. LCCN 23010280.
- — (1940). A Treatise on the Anglo-American System of Evidence in Trials at Common Law: Including the Statutes and Judicial Decisions of All Jurisdictions of the United States and Canada (3rd ed.). Little, Brown.

=== Books ===
- — (1940). Evidence in trials at common law (3rd ed.). Little Brown and Company. OCLC 10206127.
