= 1912 Connecticut gubernatorial election =

- November 5, 1912

Nominee	Simeon E. Baldwin	J. P. Studley
Party	Democratic	Republican
Popular vote	78,264	67,531
Percentage	41.11%	35.47%
Nominee	Herbert Smith	Samuel E. Beardsley
Party	Progressive	Socialist
Popular vote	31,020	10,236
Percentage	16.29%	5.38%
- Baldwin: 30–40% 40–50% 50–60% 60–70% 80–90% Studley: 30–40% 40–50% 50–60% 60–70% 70–80% Smith: 30–40% Tie
Governor before election
Simeon E. Baldwin
Democratic
Elected Governor
Simeon E. Baldwin
Democratic

The 1912 Connecticut gubernatorial election was held on November 5, 1912. Incumbent Democrat Simeon E. Baldwin defeated Republican nominee J. P. Studley with 41.11% of the vote.

== General election ==
=== Candidates ===
Major party candidates

- Simeon E. Baldwin, Democratic
- J. P. Studley, Republican

Other candidates

- Herbert Smith, Progressive
- Samuel E. Beardsley, Socialist
- B. B. Bassette, Prohibition
- Charles B. Wells, Socialist Labor

=== Results ===
1912 Connecticut gubernatorial election
Party	Candidate	Votes	%	±%
Democratic	Simeon E. Baldwin (incumbent)	78,264	41.11%	
Republican	J. P. Studley	67,531	35.47%	
Progressive	Herbert Smith	31,020	16.29%	
Socialist	Samuel E. Beardsley	10,236	5.38%	
Prohibition	B. B. Bassette	2,096	1.10%	
Socialist Labor	Charles B. Wells	1,247	0.66%	
Majority		10,733		
Turnout				
Democratic hold		Swing		
