= Annual Bulletin (Comparative Law Bureau) =

- Discipline: Comparative law
- Language: English
- Edited by: William W. Smithers

Publication details
- History: 1908–1914, (1915–1928), 1933
- Publisher: American Bar Association, via International Print. Co. (U.S.)
- Frequency: Annual

Standard abbreviations
- Bluebook: Ann. Bull.
- ISO 4: Annu. Bull.

Indexing
- LCCN: 08023300
- OCLC no.: 2038856

The Annual Bulletin of the Comparative Law Bureau of the American Bar Association (ABA) was a U.S. specialty law journal (1908–1914, 1933). The first comparative law journal in the United States, it surveyed foreign legislation and legal literature. Circulated to all ABA members, it was absorbed in 1915 by the newly formed American Bar Association Journal.

== History ==
=== Bureau ===
In 1905, a committee of the Pennsylvania State Bar Association considered the creation of a comparative law society and recommended to bring such large project to the American Bar Association. The ABA created such entity at its 1907 annual meeting, as a new section named the Comparative Law Bureau: the Bureau members would meet annually at the ABA's summer meeting and publish an annual bulletin.

The Bureau's officers included: Simeon E. Baldwin (as director, 1907–1919; ABA co-founder and president, later Governor of Connecticut) and William Smithers (as secretary, also the chairman of the Bulletin's editorial staff). The Bureau's managers included: James Barr Ames (dean at Harvard), George Kirchwey (dean at Columbia), William Draper Lewis (dean at Pennsylvania, later the founding director of the American Law Institute), and John Henry Wigmore (dean at Northwestern).

The Bureau's aims were presented in the Bulletin's first issue: (1) to publish an annual Bulletin with foreign legislation and reviews of foreign legal literature; (2) to translate and publish foreign legislation as well as relevant expert opinions; (3) to hold an annual conference for discussing comparative law; (4) to improve means by which foreign laws can become available to U.S. lawyers; (5) to promote research in the areas of foreign law; (6) to establish a list of foreign correspondents; and (7) to gather information on foreign law, such as bibliographies, for the benefit of practicing lawyers, law teachers, and students.

The Bureau met annually and published its Bulletin (separately, then within the Journal) until financial difficulties in the 1930s due to the Great Depression. In 1933, after publishing an ultimate separate Bulletin, the Bureau was merged with the ABA's International Law section, forming the ABA Section of International & Comparative Law.

=== Bulletin ===
In July 1908, the Annual Bulletin (no ISSN) was founded by the Bureau. The first comparative law journal in the United States, it provided a survey of foreign legislation and legal literature. Its first issue was a 200 or so page bulletin. Special bulletins also were foreseen, such as that issued in March of 1908, which consisted of a multi-country bibliography on marriage and divorce law. Moreover, pursuant to point 2 of the Bureau's aims noted above, the Bureau also published numerous translations of foreign laws as separate volumes. These included modern laws such as the German Civil Code and Brazilian Civil Code, as well as ancient laws, e.g., the Visigothic Code and Las Siete Partidas.

The editor (chairman of the editorial staff) was Bureau secretary Smithers (from Philadelphia, where was also the Bulletin's printer). The editorial staff in 1908 included: Simeon E. Baldwin (Yale) for general jurisprudence; Ernest Lorenzen (George Washington) and Roscoe Pound (then at Northwestern) for Germany; Charles Wetherill for Great Britain; Masuji Miyakawa for Japan; Leo Rowe (University of Pennsylvania) for Latin America; William Hastings (University of Nebraska, dean in 1910) for Russia; Samuel Parsons Scott for Spain; and Gordon Sherman for Switzerland. There were foreign correspondents from fourteen countries, including Gaston de Leval from Belgium and Eugen Huber (creator of the Swiss civil code of 1907, still in force) from Switzerland. In 1910, Smithers added Charles Lobingier to be editor for the Phillispines and Samuel Williston of Harvard as editor for German. Scott, Lobingier, Wigmore, Williston, and others in the Comparative Law Bureau were also Roman Law scholars.

The Bulletin was circulated to all ABA members and to other subscribers. Published by International Printing Co. in Philadelphia, it ran from July 1, 1908, to July 1, 1914, for volume 1 to 7.

The separate Bulletin was discontinued for two reasons: in 1914, World War I disrupted cross-Atlantic connections; and in 1915, the ABA started publishing its own Journal, into which the Bulletin was merged as an annual issue. (Though in 1933, there was an ultimate separate Bulletin, 215 page long. And in 1964, two backissues were reprinted.)

=== Journal ===
In 1915, the American Bar Association Journal (ISSN 0002-7596) was founded by the American Bar Association as a quarterly magazine (it became monthly in 1921). From 1915 to 1928, the Bulletin was merged into it: the Comparative Law Bureau controlled the second issue each year, the April number. Bureau issues stopped in 1929, but comparative and foreign law articles still regularly appeared in the Journal (about five to ten per volume).
