= Wigmore chart =

Chart for the analysis of legal evidence in trials

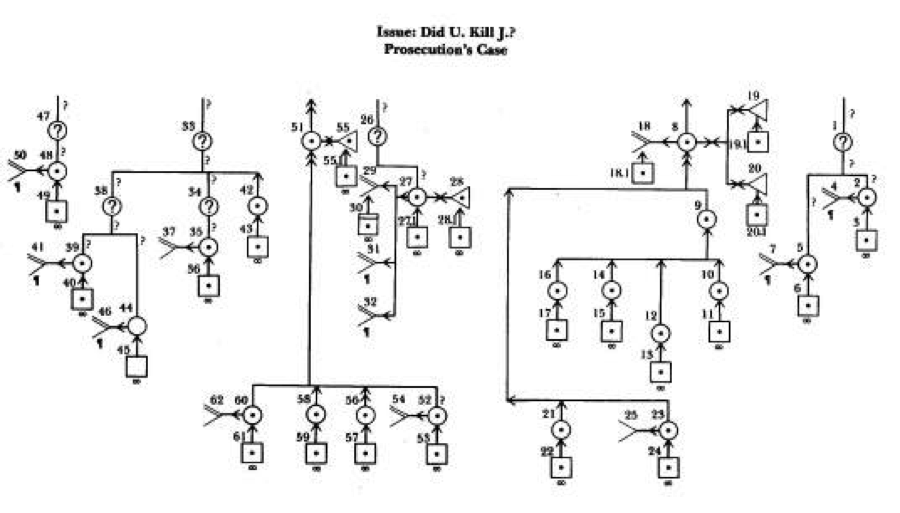
Wigmore evidence chart, from 1905

A Wigmore chart (commonly referred to as Wigmorean analysis) is a graphical method for the analysis of legal evidence in trials, developed by John Henry Wigmore. It is an early form of the modern belief network.

After completing his Wigmore on Evidence treatise in 1904, Wigmore "became convinced that something was missing." He set up a system for analyzing evidence that consisted of lines, used to represent reasoning, explanations, refutations, and conclusions; and shapes which represent facts, claims, explanations, and refutations.

Although Wigmore taught his analytic method in the classroom during the early 20th century, the Wigmore chart was all but forgotten by the 1960s. Recent scholars have rediscovered his work and used it as a basis for modern analytic standards.

== See also ==
- Bayesian network

== Bibliography ==
- Anderson, T.; et al. (2005). Analysis of Evidence (2nd ed.). Cambridge: Cambridge University Press. ISBN 0-521-67316-X.
- Kadane, J. B. & Schum, D. A. (1996). A Probabilistic Analysis of the Sacco and Vanzetti Evidence. New York: Wiley. ISBN 0-471-14182-8.
- Wigmore, J. H. (1913). "The problem of proof". Illinois Law Review. 8 (2): 77–103.
- Wigmore, J. H. (1937). The Science of Judicial Proof: As Given by Logic, Psychology and General Experience and Illustrated in Judicial Trials (3rd ed.). Boston: Little, Brown.
