= Dennis A. Blakeslee =

American politician (1856–1933)

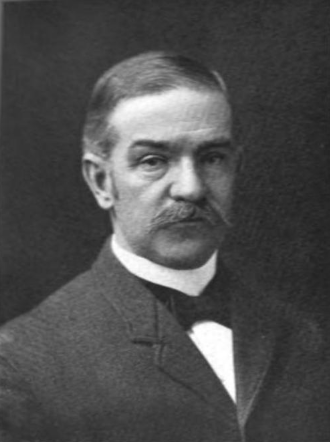

74th Lieutenant Governor of Connecticut
- In office January 4, 1911 – January 8, 1913
- Governor: Simeon E. Baldwin
- Preceded by: Frank B. Weeks
- Succeeded by: Lyman T. Tingier

Member of the Connecticut State Senate from the 9th district
- In office January 9, 1907 – January 4, 1911
- Preceded by: Minotte E. Chatfield
- Succeeded by: Amos Dickerman

Personal details
- Born: Dennis Albert Blakeslee; March 11, 1856 New Haven, Connecticut, U.S.
- Died: April 5, 1933 (aged 77) New Haven, Connecticut, U.S.
- Political party: Republican
- Spouse: Lizzie Finette Law (m. 1878)
- Children: 7
- Occupation: Contractor; politician

Dennis Albert Blakeslee (March 11, 1856 – April 5, 1933) was an American politician who was the 74th Lieutenant Governor of Connecticut from 1911 to 1913.

== Biography ==
Blakeslee was born in New Haven, Connecticut son of Charles Wells and Martha Jane Blakeslee. He worked on the farm and attended public schools. At the age of sixteen he began working for his father, a contractor, as a time keeper. He continued on with the company in Bridgeport and was in partnership with his father and his brother, Clarence, becoming a very successful contractor with particular emphasis on railroad construction. He married Lizzie Finette Law on December 4, 1878, and they had seven children, Hattie F. Blakeslee, Martha Blakeslee, Albert D. Blakeslee, Harold L. Blakeslee, Miles Blakeslee, Grant Blakeslee, and Dorothy Blakeslee.

== Career ==
In 1880 and 1881, Blakeslee was a member of the New Haven common council. From 1884 to 1890, he was fire commissioner of New Haven. He was elected as a member of the Connecticut State Senate in 1906 for a two-year term. He was reelected to another term in 1908. Blakeslee was a delegate to Republican National Convention from Connecticut in 1908. He served eight years in the Second Company of the Governor's Horse Guard, part of the time as Major in command of the organization.

Blakeslee became the 74th Lieutenant Governor of Connecticut, and served from 1911 to 1913. His service was under Democratic Governor, Simeon E. Baldwin, during whose tenure, a public utilities commission was founded, and a workmen's compensation bill was enacted, the Corrupt Practices Act, and a civil service law was passed.

== Death ==
Blakeslee died April 5, 1933 (aged 77 years, 25 days).

Political offices
Preceded by Frank B. Weeks	Lieutenant Governor of Connecticut; 1911–1913	Succeeded by Lyman T. Tingier
