= George W. Kirchwey =

American politician

George Washington Kirchwey
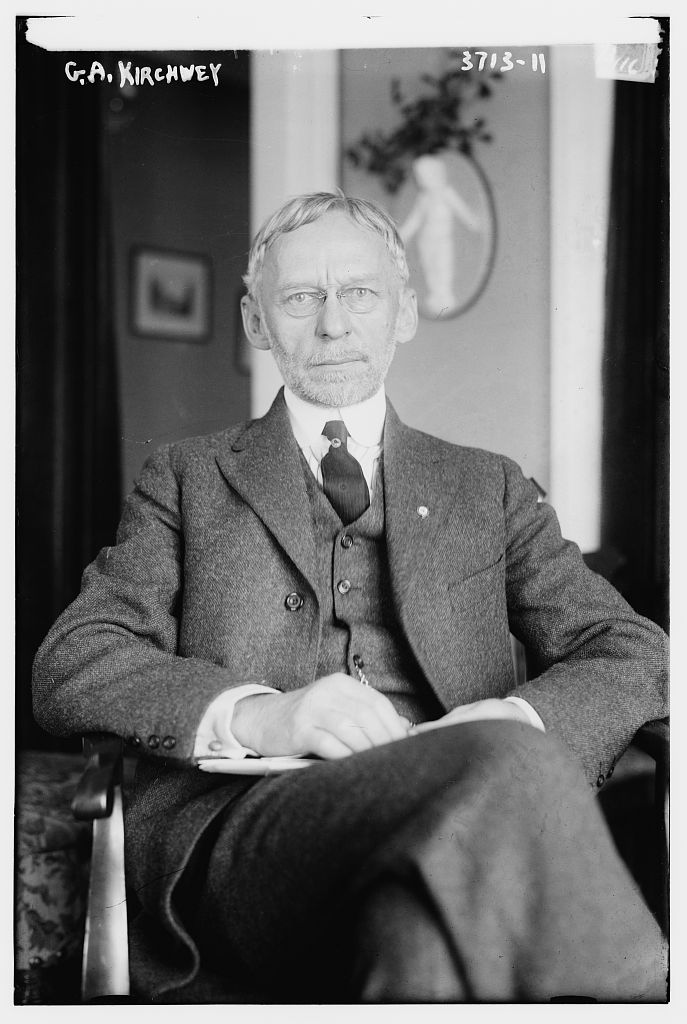
- Kirchwey in 1916

Warden of Sing Sing State Prison
- In office 1915–1916

Dean of Columbia Law School
- In office 1901–1910
- Preceded by: William A. Keener
- Succeeded by: Harlan Fiske Stone

Personal details
- Born: July 3, 1855 Detroit, Michigan
- Died: March 3, 1942 (aged 86)

George Washington Kirchwey (July 3, 1855 – March 3, 1942) was an American lawyer, politician, journalist and legal scholar. He was one of the co-founders of the New York Peace Society in 1906 and the Warden of Sing Sing State Prison from 1915 to 1916. He was president of the American Peace Society in 1917.

== Life ==
He was born on July 3, 1855, in Detroit, Michigan.

He graduated in law from Yale College in 1879, was admitted to the bar in 1882, and practiced law at Albany, New York for ten years. He edited Historical Manuscripts, State of New York (1887–1989), was professor of law at Union College, and dean of the Albany Law School (1889–1891), professor of law at Columbia University (1891–1901), dean of Columbia Law School from 1901 to 1910 and was a pioneer in the introduction of the case method of studying law. He was a manager of the 1907-founded Comparative Law Bureau of the American Bar Association, whose Annual Bulletin was the first comparative law journal in the U.S. He resigned as Kent Professor of Law from Columbia University in 1916.

He ran on the Progressive and Independence League tickets for the New York Court of Appeals in 1912, but lost to Democrat John W. Hogan.

He became an associate editor of the American Journal of International Law, president of the New York Society of Criminal Law and Sociology, and a commissioner on prison reform for the State of New York. He was Warden of Sing Sing State Prison from 1915 to 1916. He served on various committees investigating prisons and in 1918–19 was director of the United States Employment Service for New York State. He was president of the American Institute of Criminal Law and Criminology in 1917.

He died on March 3, 1942.

== Legacy ==
He was one of the co-founders of the New York Peace Society in 1906, and president of the American Peace Society in 1917.

Kirchwey was married to Dora Child Wendell and had four children. His daughter Freda Kirchwey was a longtime editor of The Nation magazine.

== Writings ==
- Historical Manuscripts of the State of New York, editor (1887–89)
- Readings in the Law of Real Property (1900)
- Select Cases and other Authorities on the Law of Mortgage (1901)

== Notes ==
Academic offices
Preceded by William A. Keener	Dean of Columbia Law School; 1901 - 1910	Succeeded by Harlan Fiske Stone
