= Lyman T. Tingier =

American politician (1862–1920)

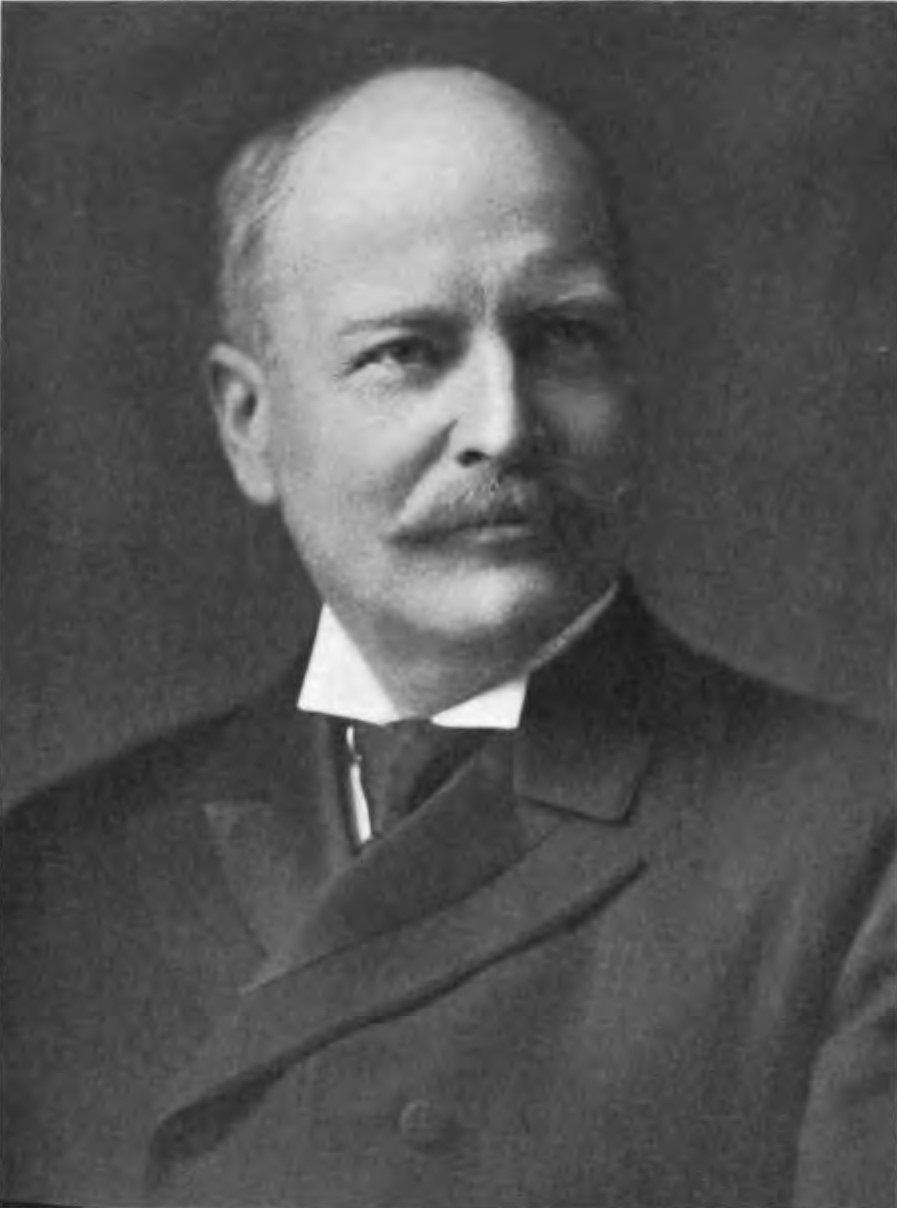
Lyman T. Tingier in 1912

Lyman Twining Tingier (June 9, 1862 – April 3, 1920) was an American politician who was the 75th lieutenant governor of Connecticut from 1913 to 1915. A Democrat, Tingier ran for the office of governor in 1914.

Tingier was born June 9, 1862, in Webster, Massachusetts, the son of Seymour Allen Tingier and Sarah Jane Twining. After attending public schools in Webster, he studied at the Nichols Academy. In 1888, Tingier graduated from Yale Law School and was admitted to the Connecticut bar. In 1889, he settled in Rockville, Connecticut. In 1893, Tingier married Charlotte Eliza Skinner.

In 1908 and 1910, Tingier was elected to the Connecticut House of Representatives. During his second term, he served on the Judiciary Committee and was selected as Democratic leader of the House. In December 1911, Tingier was also elected mayor of Rockville.

Tingier died at his home in Rockville on April 3, 1920.

Party political offices
Preceded by Simeon E. Baldwin	Democratic nominee for Governor of Connecticut; 1914	Succeeded by Morris Beardsley
Political offices
Preceded by Dennis A. Blakeslee	Lieutenant Governor of Connecticut; 1913–1915	Succeeded by Clifford B. Wilson
