= 1908 Connecticut gubernatorial election =

- November 3, 1908
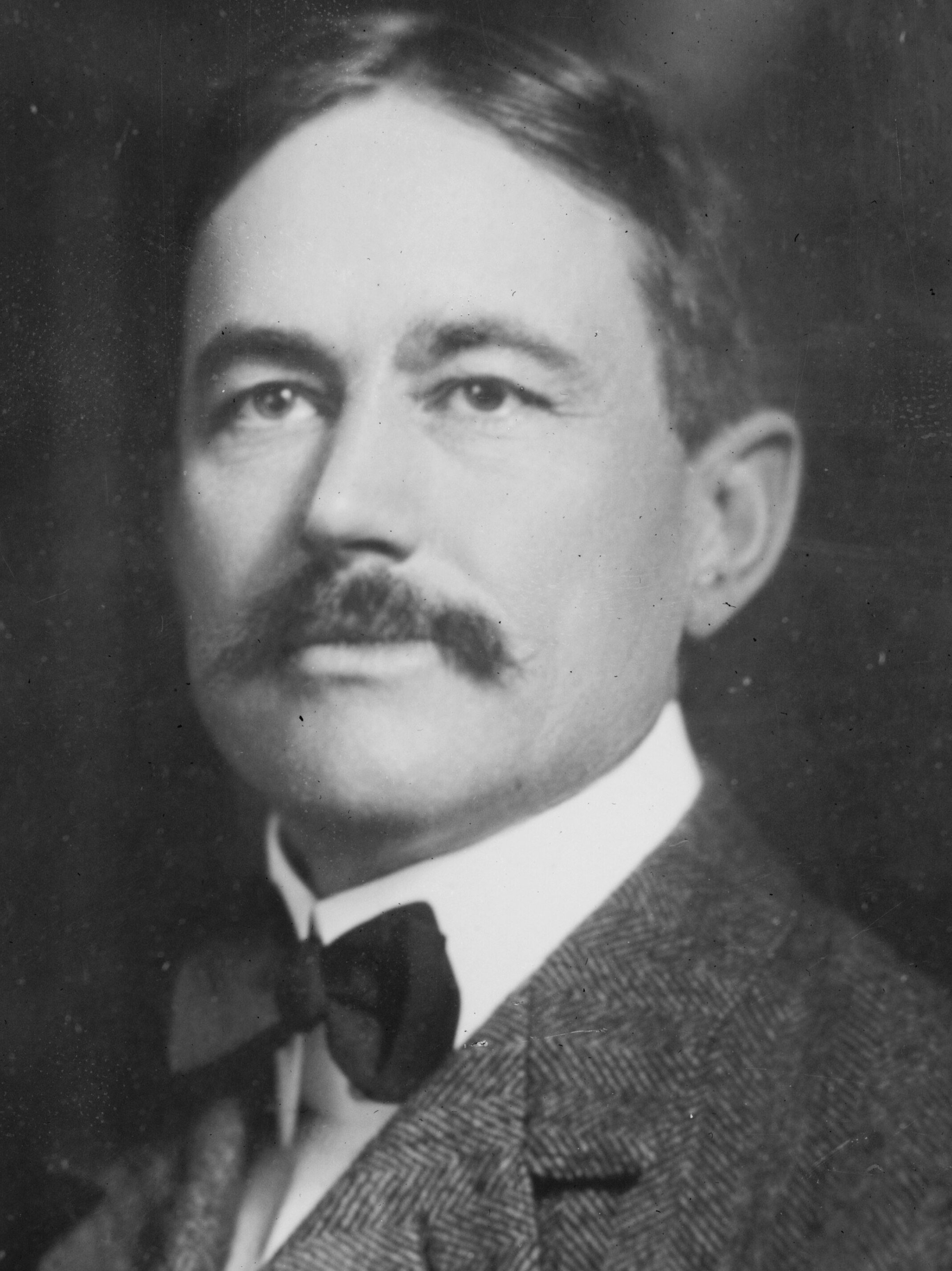

Nominee	George L. Lilley	A. Heaton Robertson
Party	Republican	Democratic
Popular vote	98,179	82,260
Percentage	51.92%	43.50%
- Lilley: 40–50% 50–60% 60–70% 70–80% 80–90% Robertson: 40–50% 50–60% 60–70%
Governor before election
Rollin S. Woodruff
Republican
Elected Governor
George L. Lilley
Republican

The 1908 Connecticut gubernatorial election was held on November 3, 1908. Republican nominee George L. Lilley defeated Democratic nominee A. Heaton Robertson with 51.92% of the vote.

== General election ==
=== Candidates ===
Major party candidates

- George L. Lilley, Republican
- A. Heaton Robertson, Democratic

Other candidates

- Charles T. Peach, Socialist
- Matthew E. O'Brien, Prohibition
- F. C. Albrecht, Independent
- Charles F. Roberts, Socialist Labor

=== Results ===
1908 Connecticut gubernatorial election
Party	Candidate	Votes	%	±%
Republican	George L. Lilley	98,179	51.92%	
Democratic	A. Heaton Robertson	82,260	43.50%	
Socialist	Charles T. Peach	4,827	2.55%	
Prohibition	Matthew E. O'Brien	2,597	1.37%	
Independent	F. C. Albrecht	622	0.33%	
Socialist Labor	Charles F. Roberts	582	0.31%	
Majority		15,919		
Turnout				
Republican hold		Swing		
