= George L. Lilley =

American politician (1859–1909)

George Leavens Lilley
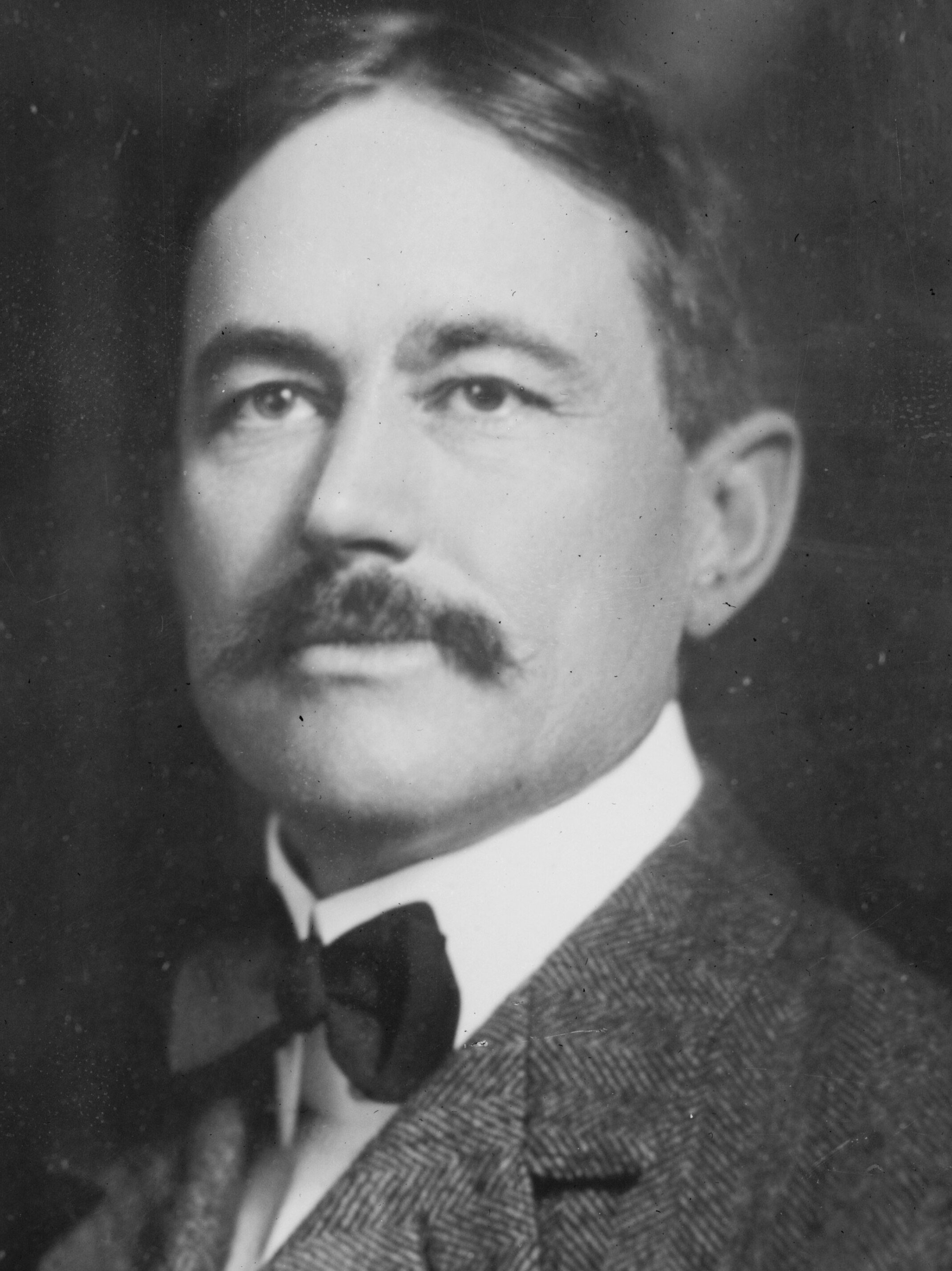

63rd Governor of Connecticut
- In office January 6, 1909 – April 21, 1909
- Lieutenant: Frank B. Weeks
- Preceded by: Rollin S. Woodruff
- Succeeded by: Frank B. Weeks

Member of the U.S. House of Representatives from Connecticut's at-large district
- In office March 4, 1903 – January 5, 1909
- Preceded by: District established
- Succeeded by: John Q. Tilson

Member of the Connecticut House of Representatives from Waterbury
- In office January 9, 1901 – January 7, 1903 Serving with Francis P. Guilfoile

Personal details
- Born: August 3, 1859 Oxford, Massachusetts, US
- Died: April 21, 1909 (aged 49) Hartford, Connecticut, US
- Party: Republican
- Spouse: Anna E. H. Steele
- Children: Frederick Lilley, John Lilley, Theodore Lilley
- Education: Worcester Technical Institute
- Profession: realtor, politician

George Leavens Lilley (August 3, 1859 – April 21, 1909) was an American politician who served as a United States representative from Connecticut's at-large district, and as the 63rd governor of Connecticut.

== Biography ==
Born in Oxford, Massachusetts, Lilley was the son of John Leavens Lilley and Caroline W. (Adams) Lilley. He attended the common schools of Oxford, the Worcester High School, and Worcester Technical Institute. He moved to Waterbury, Connecticut, in 1881 and engaged in mercantile pursuits and the real estate business. He married Anna E. H. Steele on June 17, 1884. The couple had three sons, Frederick, John, and Theodore.

== Career ==
A member of Connecticut Republican State Committee from 1901 to 1909, Lilley also served in the Connecticut House of Representatives from 1901 to 1903.

Lilley was elected as a Republican to the 58th, 59th, and 60th Congresses, holding office from March 4, 1903, to January 5, 1909. He did not seek renomination in 1908, having become a candidate for Governor. By resolution of the House of January 20, 1909, the seat was declared to have been vacated on January 6, 1909, for the reason that incumbent had entered upon the duties of the office of Governor of Connecticut the preceding day, however this only occurred because Lilley submitted his letter of resignation to the Governor of Connecticut instead of the Speaker of the House.

Lilley won the 1908 Republican gubernatorial nomination, and was elected Governor of Connecticut. During his short tenure, he increased funding for the public school system and appropriations were budgeted for a statewide movement against tuberculosis. He also endorsed governing monopolies and establishing a public service commission, but both issues were defeated by the legislature.

== Death ==
Lilley was Governor of Connecticut from January 6, 1909, until his unexpected death on April 21, 1909, in Hartford. He was a member of the Union League.

Party political offices
Preceded by Rollin S. Woodruff	Republican nominee for Governor of Connecticut; 1908	Succeeded by Charles A. Goodwin
U.S. House of Representatives
Preceded by District established	Member of the U.S. House of Representatives from Connecticut's at-large congressional district March 3, 1903 – January 5, 1909	Succeeded by John Q. Tilson
Political offices
Preceded by Rollin S. Woodruff	Governor of Connecticut; 1909	Succeeded by Frank B. Weeks
