= ABA Journal =

Magazine of the American Bar Association

- March 2007 cover of the ABA Journal
- Editor: John O'Brien
- Categories: Law
- Frequency: Bi-monthly
- Publisher: John O'Brien
- Total circulation: 250,000 (2021)
- First issue: 1915
- Company: American Bar Association
- Country: United States
- Based in: Chicago
- Language: English
- Website: ABAJournal.com
- ISSN: 0747-0088

American Bar Association Journal
- Frequency: Quarterly (1915–1920); Monthly (1921–1983); Bi-monthly (2020- )
- ISSN: 0002-7596

The ABA Journal (since 1984, formerly American Bar Association Journal, 1915–1983, which evolved from the Annual Bulletin, 1908–1914) is a monthly legal trade magazine and the flagship publication of the American Bar Association. It is complemented by a full-featured website, abajournal.com and its various e-newsletters and apps.

== History ==
=== Bulletin ===
In 1908, the Annual Bulletin was founded by the Comparative Law Bureau (1907–1933) of the American Bar Association. The first comparative law journal in the U.S., it surveyed foreign legislation and legal literature. Circulated to all ABA members, it ran from 1908 to 1914 and was absorbed in 1915 by the ABA's newly formed Journal.

=== Journal ===
In 1915, the American Bar Association Journal (abbreviated Am. Bar Assoc. j.) was founded as a quarterly magazine. Published by the ABA, it ran under this title from January 1915 to December 1983, for volume 1 to 69. Quarterly from 1915 to 1920 (with its second quarter issue dedicated to the Bulletin), it became monthly in 1921.

In January 1984, it was renamed ABA Journal (abbreviated ABA j.) for volume 70 onwards. Subtitled "The Lawyer's Magazine", it initially stayed monthly, then in May 1986 became 15 issues a year, then in June 1999 became monthly again.

In 2007, the print circulation (paid and unpaid) was 375,045 (stable from 381,998 in December 1999).

From 2012 to the end of 2017, the executive editor and publisher was Allen Pusey. In February 2018, Molly McDonough, was named editor and publisher. John O'Brien took over as editor and publisher in November 2019.

=== Online ===
==== ABA Journal (Online) ====
In 1996, an online complement to the Journal appeared on the ABA website. This original version had monthly updates providing the current Journal's cover and table of contents, as well as online copies of some selected articles, rising through various design changes from about 3 per month in 1996 to about 15 per month in 2000, to about 30 per month with the January 2001 new look announcing "Soon, every story in the print edition will also be available online." In 1999, the domain name ABAJournal.com had been registered and set as a redirect to the ABA website's Journal home.

==== ABAJournal.com ====
In January 2002, the site had a major redesign in form and content under then editor and publisher Danial J. Kim. The site's logo was updated to show "ABAJournal.com" as official web address (though still redirected to the ABA website). In addition to the full monthly magazine, it featured daily updates (intended to improve the mobile edition) and a weekly email newsletter called the eReport (the ABA Journal eReport). Around this time, the whole collection of the first Journal (1915–1983) was made available on the subscription website HeinOnline.

==== ABA Journal – Law News Now ====
On July 23, 2007, the site was relaunched under then editor and publisher Edward A. Adams in a Web 2.0 version. Subtitled "Law News Now", it features breaking legal news updated daily and analysis from more than 2,000 legal blogs, as well as a free archive of the full-text magazine since its January 2004 issue, with a search engine. Technically, the magazine is now hosted directly on the ABAJournal.com web address (instead of the domain being redirected to the ABA's website).
