= Frank B. Weeks =

American politician

Frank Bentley Weeks
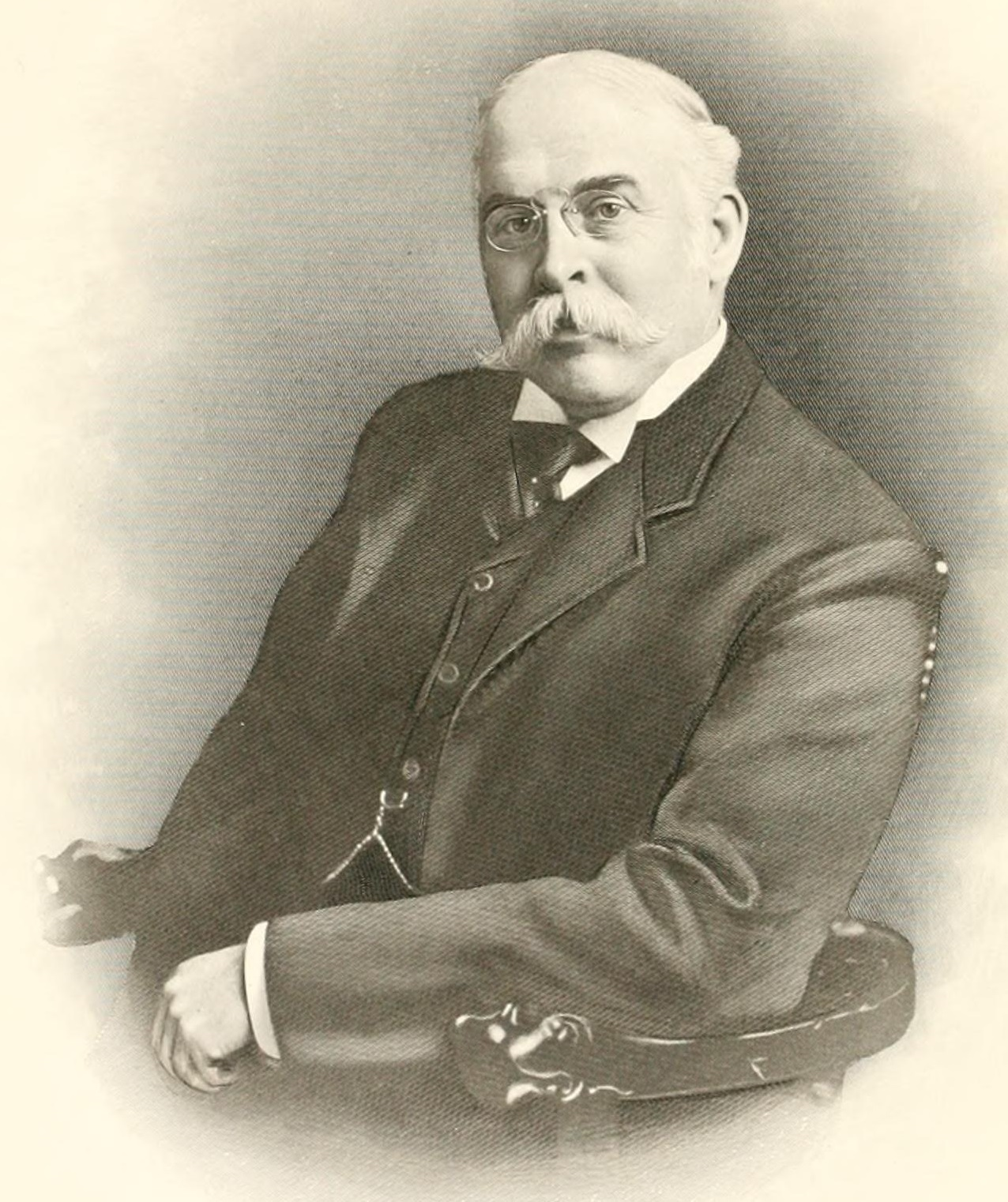

64th Governor of Connecticut
- In office April 21, 1909 – January 4, 1911
- Lieutenant: Vacant
- Preceded by: George L. Lilley
- Succeeded by: Simeon E. Baldwin

73rd Lieutenant Governor of Connecticut
- In office January 6, 1909 – April 21, 1909
- Governor: George L. Lilley
- Preceded by: Everett J. Lake
- Succeeded by: Dennis A. Blakeslee

Personal details
- Born: January 20, 1854 Brooklyn, New York, US
- Died: October 2, 1935 (aged 81) Middletown, Connecticut, US
- Party: Republican
- Spouse: Helen Louise Hubbard
- Education: Eastman Business College
- Profession: banker politician

Frank Bentley Weeks (January 20, 1854 – October 2, 1935) was an American politician and the 64th governor of Connecticut.

== Biography ==
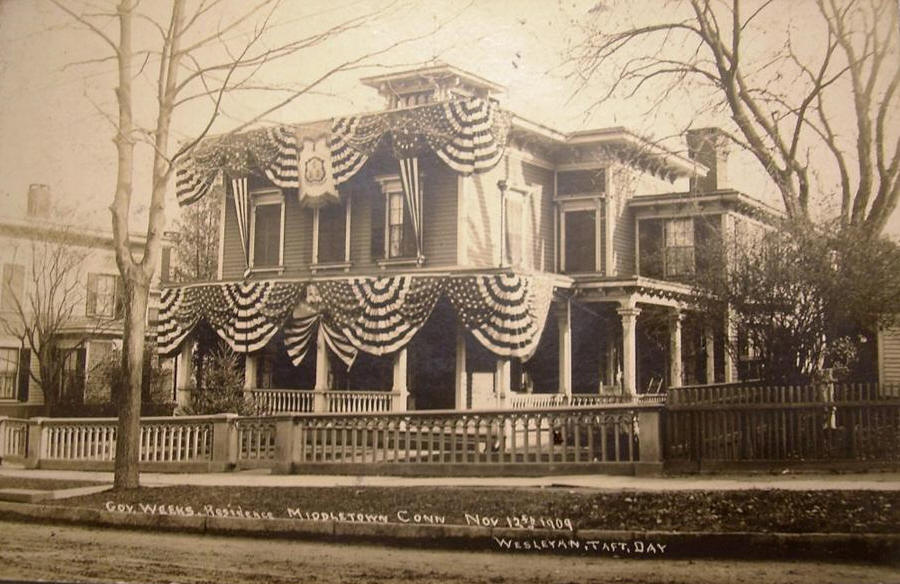
Home of Frank Weeks decorated for "Wesleyan Taft Day" 1909

Weeks was born in Brooklyn, New York on January 20, 1854, son of Daniel Lyon Weeks and Frances M (Edwards) Weeks. He studied at the Eastman Business College and graduated in 1872. Later in 1872, Weeks became an assistant to the superintendent of the Connecticut Hospital for the Insane. He also served there as a trustee for more than 30 years. He was married on November 4, 1875, to Helen L. Hubbard. He was a member of the Hartford Club, Middletown Historical Society, and the Society of Colonial Wars.

== Career ==
Weeks worked as director of the Middletown Mutual Assurance Company and the Middletown Savings Bank. He established the Middletown Board of Trade. From 1880 to 1895 he was a partner in Coles and Weeks, a grain milling business.

Weeks was a presidential elector in 1904. He was elected 73rd Lieutenant Governor of Connecticut in November 1908. When George Lilley, who was the Governor of Connecticut at the time, died on April 21, 1909, Weeks assumed the duties of the governorship. During his term, he followed former Governor's economic policies in an attempt to reduce taxes. The population of the state of Connecticut grew rapidly with a heavy influx of immigrants and growth in urban areas. Weeks regulated the budget and also resisted monopolies in support of industry regulations. After finishing Governor Lilley's term, he left office on January 4, 1911, and returned to his business activities. He was a delegate to the 1912 Republican National Convention. He was also a trustee of Wesleyan University. He was a charter member of the Middletown Historical Society, and a member of the Society of Colonial Wars and the Hartford Club.

== Death ==
Weeks died on October 2, 1935.

Political offices
| Preceded by Everett J. Lake | Lieutenant Governor of Connecticut; 1909 | Succeeded by Dennis A. Blakeslee |
| Preceded by George L. Lilley | Governor of Connecticut; 1909–1911 | Succeeded by Simeon E. Baldwin |
