= 1932 Georgia gubernatorial election =

1932 Georgia Democratic gubernatorial primary
- September 14, 1932

410 county unit votes 206 unit votes needed to win
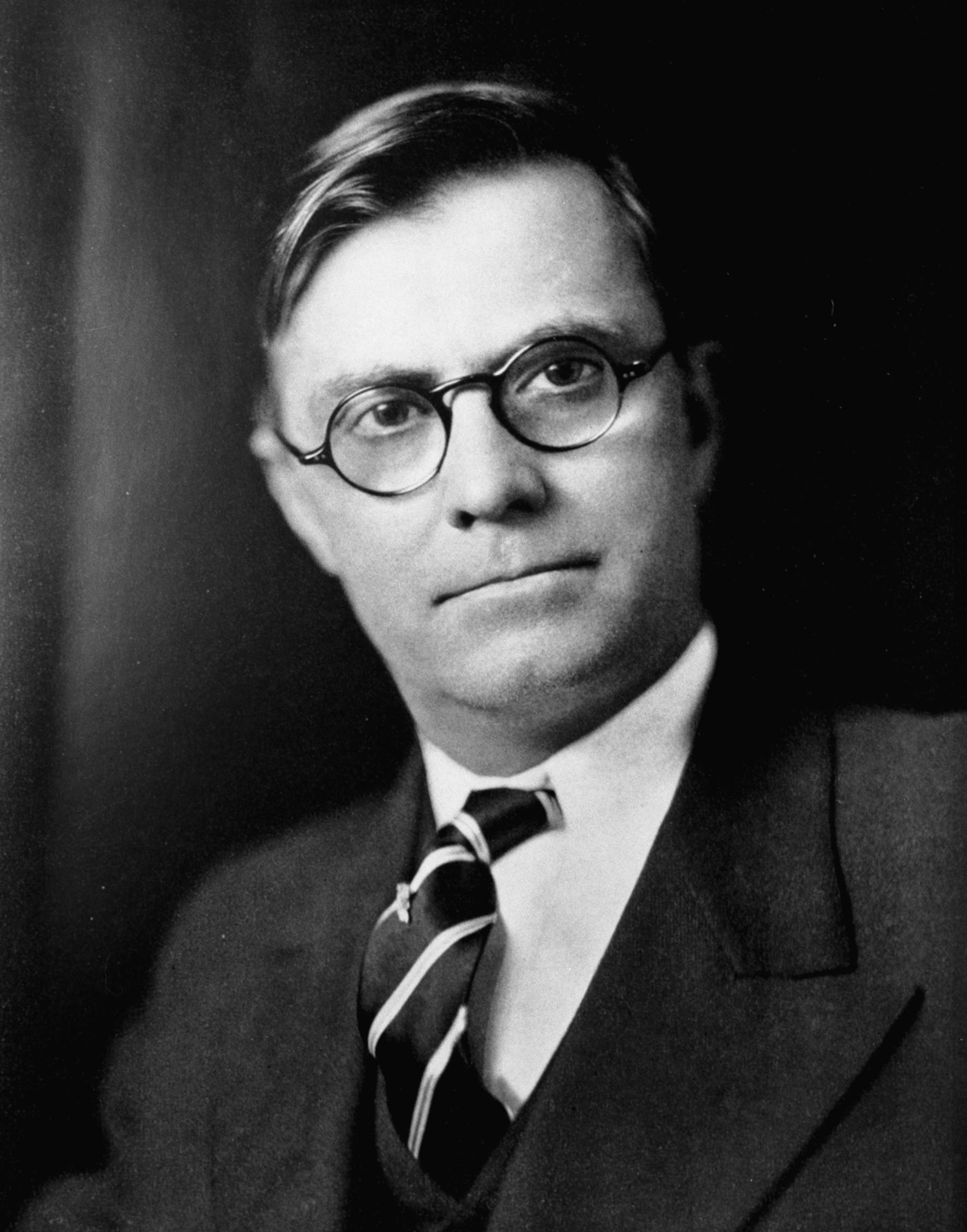

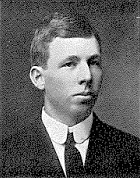

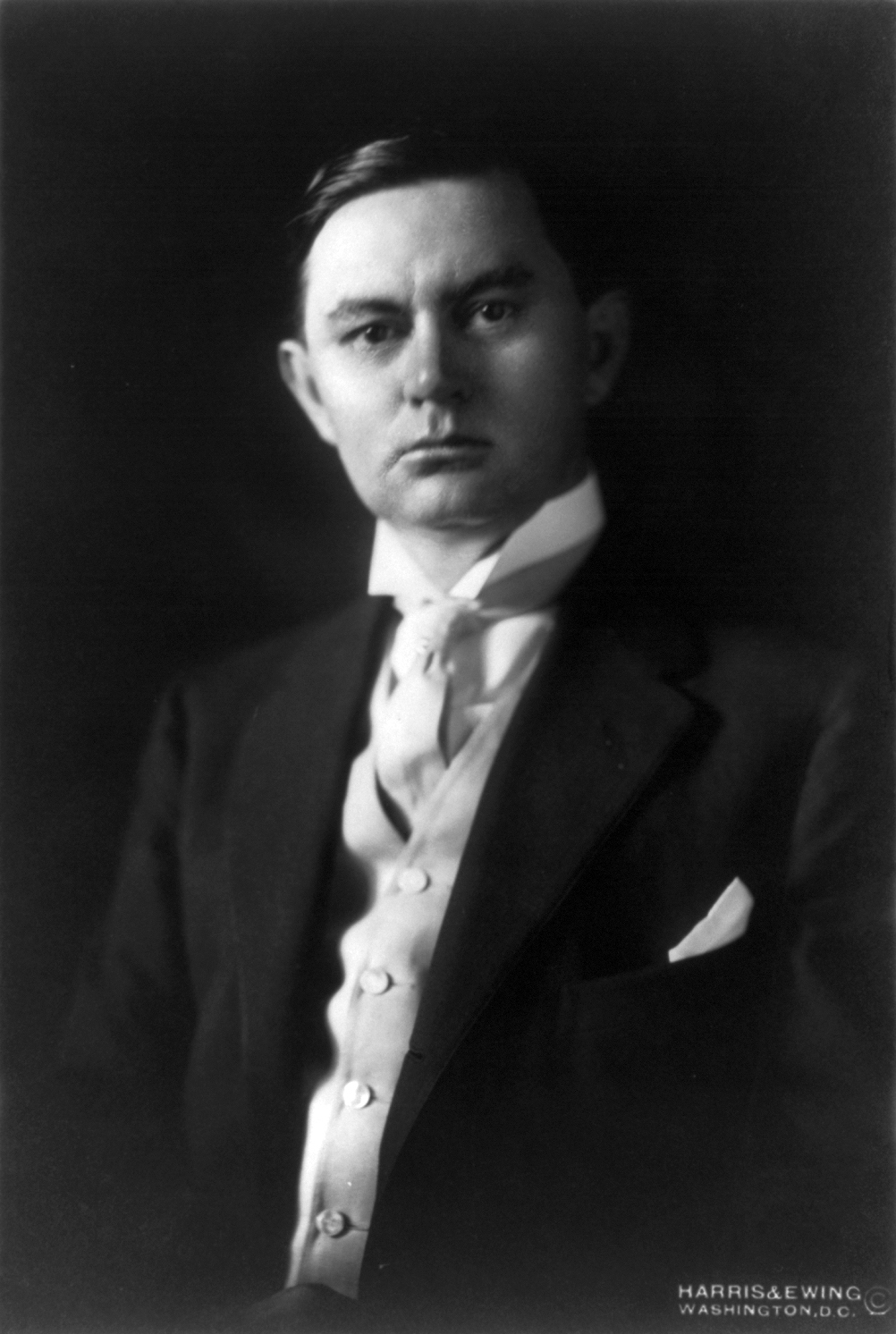

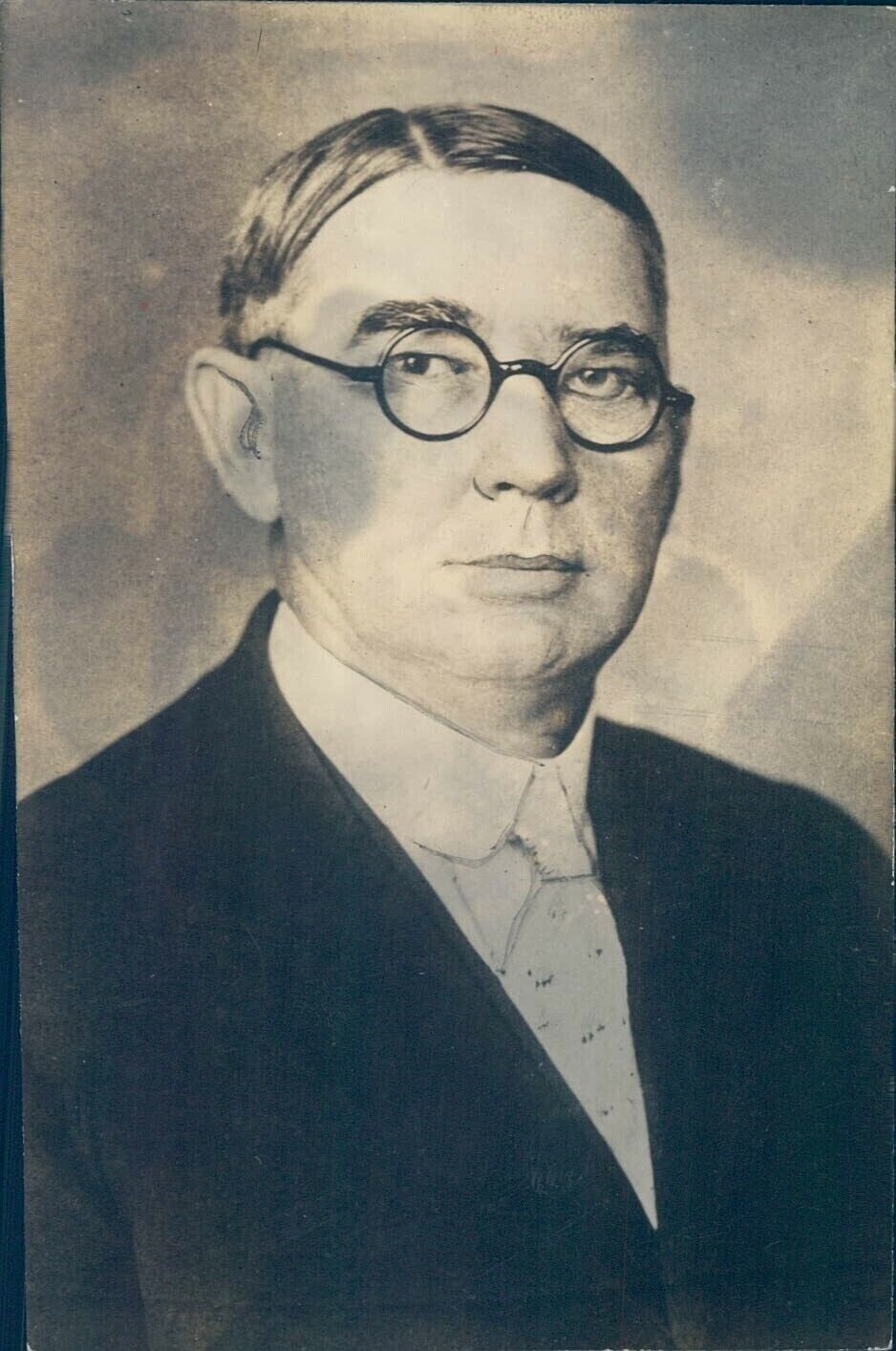
Nominee	Eugene Talmadge	Hosea Abit Nix
Party	Democratic	Democratic
Electoral vote	264	94
Popular vote	116,381	78,588
Percentage	42.02%	28.38%
Nominee	Thomas W. Hardwick	John N. Holder
Party	Democratic	Democratic
Electoral vote	30	10
Popular vote	35,252	19,697
Percentage	12.73%	7.11%
- County results Talmadge: 20–30% 30–40% 40–50% 50–60% 60–70% 70–80% 80–90% Nix: 30–40% 40–50% 50–60% 60–70% 70–80% 80–90% Hardwick: 30–40% 40–50% 50–60% Holder: 30–40% 50–60% Edwards: 30–40% 60–70% Kelley: 50–60%
Governor before election
Richard Russell Jr.
Democratic
Elected Governor
Eugene Talmadge
Democratic

The 1932 Georgia gubernatorial election took place on November 8, 1932, in order to elect the governor of Georgia.

Incumbent Democratic governor Richard Russell Jr. did not run for re-election to a second term, but instead ran for the U.S. Senate.

As was common at the time, the Democratic candidate ran unopposed in the general election so therefore the Democratic primary was the real contest, and winning the primary was considered tantamount to election.

== Democratic primary ==
The Democratic primary election was held on September 14, 1932. As Talmadge won a majority of county unit votes, there was no run-off.

=== County unit system ===
From 1917 until 1962, the Democratic Party in the U.S. state of Georgia used a voting system called the county unit system to determine victors in statewide primary elections.

The system was ostensibly designed to function similarly to the Electoral College, but in practice the large ratio of unit votes for small, rural counties to unit votes for more populous urban areas provided outsized political influence to the smaller counties.

Under the county unit system, the 159 counties in Georgia were divided by population into three categories. The largest eight counties were classified as "Urban", the next-largest 30 counties were classified as "Town", and the remaining 121 counties were classified as "Rural". Urban counties were given 6 unit votes, Town counties were given 4 unit votes, and Rural counties were given 2 unit votes, for a total of 410 available unit votes. Each county's unit votes were awarded on a winner-take-all basis.

Candidates were required to obtain a majority of unit votes (not necessarily a majority of the popular vote), or 206 total unit votes, to win the election. If no candidate received a majority in the initial primary, a runoff election was held between the top two candidates to determine a winner.

=== Candidates ===
- H. B. Edwards
- Thomas W. Hardwick, former governor
- John N. Holder, former chairman of the State Highway Commission and unsuccessful candidate for Democratic nomination for governor in 1920 and 1926
- John I. Kelley
- Hosea Abit Nix, attorney
- Hoke O'Kelley, businessman
- F. B. Summers
- Eugene Talmadge, incumbent State Commissioner of Agriculture

=== Results ===
Candidate	Popular vote		County unit vote	
Candidate	Votes	%	Votes	%
Eugene Talmadge	116,381	42.02	264	64.39
Hosea Abit Nix	78,588	28.38	94	22.93
Thomas W. Hardwick	35,252	12.73	30	7.32
John N. Holder	19,697	7.11	10	2.44
H. B. Edwards	12,897	4.66	8	1.95
John I. Kelley	12,115	4.37	4	0.98
Hoke O'Kelley	1,823	0.66		
F. B. Summers	197	0.07		
Total	276,950	100.00	410	100.00

== General election ==
In the general election, Talmadge ran unopposed.

=== Results ===
1932 Georgia gubernatorial election
Party	Candidate	Votes	%	±%
Democratic	Eugene Talmadge	240,242	100.00%	
Turnout		240,242	100.00%	
Democratic hold		Swing		

== Bibliography ==
- Gubernatorial Elections, 1787-1997. Washington, D.C.: Congressional Quarterly Inc. 1998. ISBN 1-56802-396-0.
- Glashan, Roy R. (1979). American Governors and Gubernatorial Elections, 1775-1978. Meckler Books. ISBN 0-930466-17-9.
- Compiled by Mrs. J.E. Hays, State Historian and Director (1937). Georgia's Official Register, 1933-1935-1937 (PDF). Atlanta, GA: State of Georgia, Department of Archives and History.
