= 1920 United States gubernatorial elections =

← 1919	November 2, 1920; September 13, 1920 (ME)	1921 →

35 governorships
	Majority party	Minority party
Party	Republican	Democratic
Seats before	27	20
Seats after	34	14
Seat change	▲7	▼6
Seats up	22	12
Seats won	29	6
	Third party
Party	Prohibition
Seats before	1
Seats after	0
Seat change	▼1
Seats up	1
Seats won	0
- Democratic gain Democratic hold Republican gain Republican hold

United States gubernatorial elections were held in 1920, in 35 states, concurrent with the House, Senate elections and presidential election, on November 2, 1920. Elections took place on September 13 in Maine.

In Massachusetts, the governor was elected to a two-year term for the first time, instead of a one-year term. Every governorship mirrored the presidential results in their state.

This is the most recent year in which all gubernatorial elections were won by the same party that won the state in the year's presidential election.

== Results ==
State	Incumbent	Party	Status	Opposing candidates
Arizona	Thomas Edward Campbell	Republican	Re-elected, 54.15%	Mit Simms (Democratic) 45.85%
Arkansas	Charles Hillman Brough	Democratic	Retired, Democratic victory	Thomas C. McRae (Democratic) 65.02% Wallace Townsend (Republican) 24.38% J. H. Blount ("Black-and-Tan" Republican) 8.22% Sam Butler (Socialist) 2.38%
Colorado	Oliver Henry Nelson Shoup	Republican	Re-elected, 59.55%	James M. Collins (Democratic) 37.11% William Penn Collins (Farmer Labor) 3.35%
Connecticut	Marcus H. Holcomb	Republican	Retired, Republican victory	Everett J. Lake (Republican) 63.04% Rollin U. Tyler (Democratic) 33.25% Charles T. Peach (Socialist) 2.77% Edward Pryor (Socialist Labor) 0,52% Albert P. Krone (Farmer Labor) 0.41%
Delaware	John G. Townsend Jr.	Republican	Retired, Republican victory	William Denney (Republican) 55.23% Andrew J. Lynch (Democratic) 43.68% William H. Conner (Socialist) 1.09%
Florida	Sidney Johnston Catts	Prohibition	Term-limited, Democratic victory	Cary A. Hardee (Democratic) 77.94% George E. Gay (Republican) 17.93% F. C. Whitaker (Socialist) 2.13% W. L. Van Duzer (White Republican) 2.00%
Georgia	Hugh Dorsey	Democratic	Term-limited, Democratic victory	Thomas W. Hardwick (Democratic) 100.00% (Democratic primary run-off results); Thomas W. Hardwick 55.25% Clifford M. Walker 44.75%
Idaho	David W. Davis	Republican	Re-elected, 52.97%	Ted A. Walters (Democratic) 26.93% Sherman D. Fairchild (Independent) 20.11%
Illinois	Frank Orren Lowden	Republican	Retired, Republican victory	Len Small (Republican) 58.87% James Hamilton Lewis (Democratic) 34.64% Andrew Lafin (Socialist) 2.79% John H. Walker (Farmer Labor) 2.68% James H. Woertendyke (Prohibition) 0.47% Scattering 0.55%
Indiana	James P. Goodrich	Republican	Term-limited, Republican victory	Warren T. McCray (Republican) 54.63% Carleton B. McCulloch (Democratic) 41.20% Andrew J. Hart (Socialist) 1.86% James M. Zion (Farmer Labor) 1.33% Charles M. Kroft (Prohibition) 0.98%
Iowa	William L. Harding	Republican	Term-limited, Republican victory	Nathan E. Kendall (Republican) 58.66% Clyde L. Herring (Democratic) 38.65% George J. Peck (Socialist) 1.56% Mathis Faber (Farmer Labor) 1.05% J. Jay Hisel (Socialist Labor) 0.09%
Kansas	Henry Justin Allen	Republican	Re-elected, 58.44%	Jonathan M. Davis (Democratic) 39.27% Roy Stanton (Socialist) 2.29%
Maine (held, 13 September 1920)	Carl Milliken	Republican	Defeated in Republican primary, Republican victory	Frederic H. Parkhurst (Republican) 65.90% Bertrand G. McIntire (Democratic) 34.10%
Massachusetts	Calvin Coolidge	Republican	Retired to run for U.S. Vice President, Republican victory	Channing H. Cox (Republican) 67.02% John Jackson Walsh (Democratic) 30.22% Walter S. Hutchins (Socialist) 2.09% Patrick Mulligan (Socialist Labor) 0.66%
Michigan	Albert Sleeper	Republican	Retired, Republican victory	Alex J. Groesbeck (Republican) 66.43% Woodbridge N. Ferris (Democratic) 29.34% Benjamin Blumenberg (Socialist) 2.22% J. Jeffries (Farmer Labor) 1.12% Faith Johnston (Prohibition) 0.66% E. R. Markley (Socialist Labor) 0.20% Scattering 0.03%
Minnesota	J. A. A. Burnquist	Republican	Retired, Republican victory	J. A. O. Preus (Republican) 53.06% Henrik Shipstead (Independent) 35.91% Laurence C. Hodgson (Democratic) 10.37% Peter J. Sampson (Socialist) 0.65%
Missouri	Frederick D. Gardner	Democratic	Term-limited, Republican victory	Arthur M. Hyde (Republican) 54.25% John M. Atkinson (Democratic) 43.64% Marvin M. Aldrich (Socialist) 1.46% Herman P. Faris (Prohibition) 0.30% Vaughn Hickman (Farmer Labor) 0.23% Edward G. Middlecoff (Socialist Labor) 0.12%
Montana	Sam V. Stewart	Democratic	Retired, Republican victory	Joseph M. Dixon (Republican) 59.74% Burton K. Wheeler (Democratic) 40.26%
Nebraska	Samuel R. McKelvie	Republican	Re-elected, 40.41%	John H. Morehead (Democratic) 34.48% Arthur G. Wray (Non-Partisan League) 23.51% Julian D. Graves (Prohibition) 1.60%
New Hampshire	John H. Bartlett	Republican	Retired, Republican victory	Albert O. Brown (Republican) 59.59% Charles E. Tilton (Democratic) 39.72% Frank T. Butler (Socialist) 0.69%
New Mexico	Octaviano Larrazolo	Republican	Defeated for renomination, Republican victory	Merritt C. Mechem (Republican) 51.26% Richard H. Hanna (Democratic) 47.80% W. E. McGrath (Farmer Labor) 0.95%
New York	Alfred E. Smith	Democratic	Defeated, 44.00%	Nathan L. Miller (Republican) 46.58% Joseph D. Cannon (Socialist) 5.57% Dudley Field Malone (Farmer Labor) 2.44% George F. Thompson (Prohibition) 1.24% John P. Quinn (Socialist Labor) 0.18%
North Carolina	Thomas Walter Bickett	Democratic	Term-limited, Democratic victory	Cameron A. Morrison (Democratic) 57.22% John J. Parker (Republican) 42.74% W. B. Taylor (Socialist) 0.04%
North Dakota	Lynn J. Frazier	Republican	Re-elected, 51.01%	J. F. T. O'Connor (Democratic) 48.99%
Ohio	James M. Cox	Democratic	Retired to run for U.S. President, Republican victory	Harry L. Davis (Republican) 51.91% A. Victor Donahey (Democratic) 45.88% Frank B. Hamilton (Socialist) 2.14% Earl H. Foote (Single Tax) 0.08%
Rhode Island	R. Livingston Beeckman	Republican	Retired, Republican victory	Emery J. San Souci (Republican) 64.64% Edward M. Sullivan (Democratic) 33.15% Ernest Sherwood (Socialist) 1.95% Peter McDermott (Socialist Labor) 0.27%
South Carolina	Robert Archer Cooper	Democratic	Re-elected, 100.00%	(Democratic primary results); Robert Archer Cooper 100.00%
South Dakota	Peter Norbeck	Republican	Retired to run for U.S. Senate, Republican victory	William H. McMaster (Republican) 56.33% Mark P. Bates (Non-Partisan League) 26.34% W. W. Howes (Democratic) 17.33%
Tennessee	Albert H. Roberts	Democratic	Defeated, 44.56%	Alfred A. Taylor (Republican) 54.93% J. M. Lindsley (Socialist) 0.51%
Texas	William P. Hobby	Democratic	Retired, Democratic victory	Pat Morris Neff (Democratic) 60.03% J. G. Culbertson (Republican) 18.73% T. H. McGregor (American) 14.40% H. Capers (Black and Tan Republican) 5.42% L. L. Rhodes (Socialist) 1.41% Scattering 0.01%
Utah	Simon Bamberger	Democratic	Retired, Republican victory	Charles Rendell Mabey (Republican) 57.59% Thomas N. Taylor (Democratic) 38.78% E. B. Locke (Socialist) 2.01% George Crosby (Farmer Labor) 1.62%
Vermont	Percival W. Clement	Republican	Retired, Republican victory	James Hartness (Republican) 78.00% Fred C. Martin (Democratic) 21.80% Scattering 0.20%
Washington	Louis Folwell Hart	Republican	Re-elected, 52.25%	Robert Bridges (Farmer Labor) 30.10% William Wilson Black (Democratic) 16.39% David Burgess (Socialist Labor) 1.26%
West Virginia	John J. Cornwell	Democratic	Term-limited, Republican victory	Ephraim F. Morgan (Republican) 47.32% Arthur B. Koontz (Democratic) 36.27% S. B. Montgomery (Independent) 15.89% D. M. S. Holt (Socialist) 0.53%
Wisconsin	Emanuel L. Philipp	Republican	Retired, Republican victory	John J. Blaine (Republican) 52.98% Robert Bruce McCoy (Democratic) 35.84% William Coleman (Socialist) 10.29% Henry H. Tubbs (Prohibition) 0.88% Scattering 0.02%

== See also ==
- 1920 United States elections
  - 1920 United States presidential election
  - 1920 United States Senate elections
  - 1920 United States House of Representatives elections

== Bibliography ==
- Glashan, Roy R. (1979). American Governors and Gubernatorial Elections, 1775-1978. Meckler Books. ISBN 0-930466-17-9.
- "Primary Election Returns, 1919-1997: South Carolina". Gubernatorial Elections, 1787-1997. Washington, D.C.: Congressional Quarterly Inc. 1998. ISBN 1-56802-396-0.
