= List of elections in 1919 =

The following elections occurred in the year 1919.

== Africa ==
- 1919 Liberian general election

== America ==
=== Canada ===
- 1919 Edmonton municipal election
- 1919 Newfoundland general election
- 1919 Ontario general election
- 1919 Ontario prohibition referendum
- 1919 Prince Edward Island general election
- 1919 Quebec general election
- Quebec referendum on the prohibition of alcohol
- 1919 Toronto municipal election

=== United States ===
- 1919 New York state election

==== United States gubernatorial ====
- 1919 Kentucky gubernatorial election
- 1919 Maryland gubernatorial election
- 1919 Massachusetts gubernatorial election
- 1919 Mississippi gubernatorial election
- 1919 New Jersey gubernatorial election
- 1919 United States gubernatorial elections

==== United States House of Representatives ====
- 1919 United States House of Representatives elections

==== United States mayoral elections ====
- 1919 Baltimore mayoral election
- 1919 Chicago mayoral election
- 1919 Columbus, Ohio mayoral election
- 1919 Los Angeles mayoral election
- 1919 Manchester, New Hampshire mayoral election
- 1919 Philadelphia mayoral election
- 1919 San Diego mayoral election
- 1919 San Francisco mayoral election

=== Other ===
- 1919 Brazilian presidential election
- 1919 Costa Rican general election
- 1919 Costa Rican parliamentary election
- Honduran general election, 1919 (October)
- 1919 Peruvian presidential election
- 1919 Salvadoran presidential election
- 1919 Uruguayan parliamentary election

== Asia ==
- 1919 Armenian parliamentary election
- 1919 Ottoman general election
- 1919 Philippine House of Representatives elections
- 1919 Philippine Senate elections
- 1919 Philippine legislative election

== Europe ==
- 1919 Armenian parliamentary election
- 1919 Austrian Constituent Assembly election
- 1919 Belgian general election
- 1919 Bulgarian parliamentary election
- 1919 Estonian Constituent Assembly election
- 1919 Finnish parliamentary election
- 1919 Finnish presidential election
- 1919 French legislative election
- 1919 Georgian legislative election
- 1919 Icelandic parliamentary election
- 1919 Italian general election
- 1919 Liechtenstein referendum
- 1919 Luxembourg general election
- 1919 Luxembourg referendum
- 1919 Norwegian local elections
- 1919 Ottoman general election
- 1919 Polish legislative election
- 1919 Portuguese legislative election
- 1919 Portuguese presidential election
- 1919 Romanian general election
- 1919 Spanish general election
- 1919 Swiss federal election
- 1919 Swiss referendums

=== Austria ===
- de:Landtagswahl in Niederösterreich 1919
- de:Landtagswahl in Oberösterreich 1919
- de:Landtagswahl in Salzburg 1919
- de:Landtagswahl in der Steiermark 1919
- de:Landtagswahl in Tirol 1919
- de:Landtagswahl in Vorarlberg 1919

=== Germany ===
- 1919 German presidential election
- 1919 German federal election
- Free State of Prussia: constitutional convention elected on 26 January 1919
- Republic of Baden: constitutional convention elected 12 January 1919
- Freistaat Bremen:
  - election of a workers' and soldiers' council on 6 January 1919
  - election of a constitutional convention on 9 March 1919
- Hamburg: election of the Hamburg Parliament on 16 March 1919
- People's State of Hesse: election of a constitutional convention on 26 January 1919

=== United Kingdom ===
- 1919 Aberdeenshire and Kincardineshire Central by-election
- 1919 Bothwell by-election
- 1919 Bromley by-election
- 1919 Chester-le-Street by-election
- 1919 Croydon South by-election
- 1919 East Antrim by-election
- 1919 Kingston upon Hull Central by-election
- 1919 Leyton West by-election
- 1919 Liverpool West Derby by-election
- 1919 Manchester Rusholme by-election
- 1919 North Londonderry by-election
- 1919 Plymouth Sutton by-election
- 1919 Pontefract by-election
- 1919 St Albans by-election
- 1919 Swansea East by-election
- English local: 1919 Southwark Borough election

== Oceania ==
=== Australia ===
- 1919 Australian Senate election
- 1919 Australian federal election
- 1919 Australian referendum
- 1919 Echuca by-election
- May 1919 Paddington state by-election
- July 1919 Paddington state by-election
- 1919 Petersham state by-election
- 1919 Tasmanian state election

=== New Zealand ===
- 1919 New Zealand general election

== See also ==
- Category:1919 elections
