= 1919 United States gubernatorial elections =

← 1918	November 4, 1919; April 20, 1920 (LA)	1920 →

6 governorships
	Majority party	Minority party
Party	Republican	Democratic
Seats before	27 (Note: Louis Folwell Hart (R) succeeded Washington Governor Ernest Lister (D) upon his resignation in February 1919.)	20
Seats after	27	20
Seat change	Steady	Steady
Seats up	2	4
Seats won	2	4
- Democratic gain Democratic hold Republican gain Republican hold

United States gubernatorial elections were held in 1919, in six states. Kentucky, Louisiana, Maryland and Mississippi held their gubernatorial elections in odd numbered years, every 4 years, preceding the United States presidential election year. New Jersey at this time held gubernatorial elections every 3 years. It would abandon this practice in 1949. This was the last time Massachusetts elected its governors to a single-year term. It switched to two-year terms from the 1920 election.

== Results ==
State	Incumbent	Party	Status	Opposing candidates
Kentucky	James D. Black	Democratic	Defeated, 45.29%	Edwin P. Morrow (Republican) 53.82% G. D. Becker (Socialist) 0.89%
Louisiana (Held, 20 April 1920)	Ruffin Pleasant	Democratic	Term-limited, Democratic victory	John Milliken Parker (Democratic) 97.47% J. Stewart Thompson (Republican) 2.53% (Democratic primary results); John Milliken Parker 54.28% Frank P. Stubbs 45.72%
Maryland	Emerson Harrington	Democratic	Retired, Democratic victory	Albert C. Ritchie (Democratic) 49.06% Harry Whinna Nice (Republican) 48.99% Arthur L. Blessing (Socialist) 1.22% Robert W. Stevens (Labor) 0.73%
Massachusetts	Calvin Coolidge	Republican	Re-elected, 60.94%	Richard H. Long (Democratic) 36.95% William A. King (Socialist) 1.35% Ingvar Paulsen (Socialist Labor) 0.45% Charles B. Ernst (Prohibition) 0.32%
Mississippi	Theodore G. Bilbo	Democratic	Term-limited, Democratic victory	Lee M. Russell (Democratic) 96.96% J. T. Lester (Socialist) 3.04% (Democratic primary run-off results); Lee M. Russell 52.67% Oscar Goodbar Johnston 47.33%
New Jersey	William Nelson Runyon	Republican	Defeated in Republican primary, Democratic victory	Edward I. Edwards (Democratic) 49.20% Newton A. K. Bugbee (Republican) 45.92% Albert Farr (Socialist) 2.49% Charles E. Lane (National Prohibition) 1.38% John C. Butterworth (Socialist Labor) 0.73% Mark M. Denterfass (Single Tax) 0.28%
