= 1920 United States elections =

- ← 1918 1919 1920 1921 1922 → Presidential election year
- Election day: November 2
- Incumbent president: ▌Woodrow Wilson (D)
- Next Congress: 67th

Presidential election
- Partisan control: Republican gain
- Popular vote margin: Republican +26.2%
- Electoral vote
- Warren G. Harding (R): 404
- James M. Cox (D): 127
- 1920 presidential election results. Red denotes states won by Harding, blue denotes states won by Cox. Numbers indicate the electoral votes won by each candidate.

Senate elections
- Overall control: Republican hold
- Seats contested: 34 of 96 seats (32 Class 3 seats + 2 special elections)
- Net seat change: Republican +10
- 1920 Senate election results Democratic gain Democratic hold Republican gain Republican hold

House elections
- Overall control: Republican hold
- Seats contested: All 435 voting members
- Net seat change: Republican +63
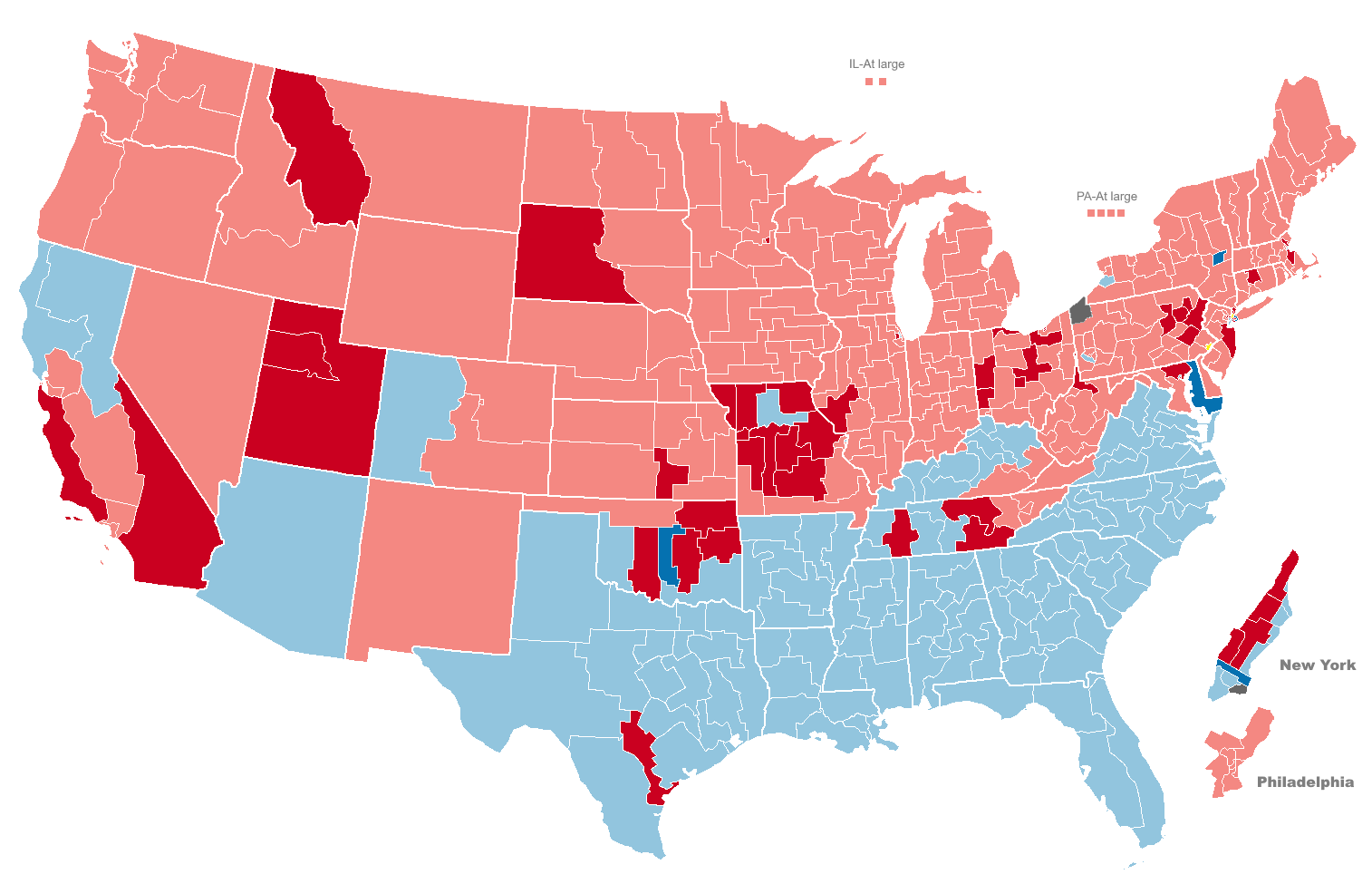
- 1920 House of Representatives results

Gubernatorial elections
- Seats contested: 35
- Net seat change: Republican +7
- 1920 gubernatorial election results Democratic gain Democratic hold Republican gain Republican hold

Elections were held on November 2, 1920. In the aftermath of World War I, the Republican Party re-established the dominant position which it had lost in the 1910 and 1912 elections. This was the first election after the ratification of the 19th Amendment, which granted women the constitutional right to vote.

In the presidential election, Republican senator Warren G. Harding from Ohio defeated Democratic governor James M. Cox of Ohio. Harding won a landslide victory, taking every state outside the Southern United States and dominating the popular vote. Harding won the Republican nomination on the tenth ballot, defeating former Army Chief of Staff Leonard Wood, Illinois governor Frank Lowden, California senator Hiram Johnson, and several other candidates. Cox won the Democratic nomination on the 44th ballot over former Treasury Secretary William Gibbs McAdoo, Attorney General A. Mitchell Palmer, New York governor Al Smith, and several other candidates. Future president Calvin Coolidge won the Republican nomination for vice president, while fellow future president Franklin D. Roosevelt won the Democratic nomination for vice president. Harding was the first sitting senator to be elected president.

The Republicans made large gains in the House and the Senate, strengthening their majority in both chambers. They picked up 63 seats in the House of Representatives, furthering their majority over the Democrats. The Republicans also strengthened their majority in the Senate, gaining ten seats.

== See also ==
- 1920 United States presidential election
- 1920 United States House of Representatives elections
- 1920 United States Senate elections
- 1920 United States gubernatorial elections
- Bagby, Wesley M. (1962). The Road to Normalcy: The Presidential Campaign and Election of 1920. Baltimore: Johns Hopkins Press.
- Brake, Robert J. "The porch and the stump: Campaign strategies in the 1920 presidential election." Quarterly Journal of Speech 55.3 (1969): 256–267.
- Buhle, Mari Jo. Women and American socialism, 1870-1920 (U of Illinois Press, 1983).
- Clemens, Elisabeth S. "Organizational repertoires and institutional change: Women's groups and the transformation of US politics, 1890-1920." American Journal of Sociology 98.4 (1993): 755–798. online
- Cooper, John Milton (2001). Breaking the Heart of the World: Woodrow Wilson and the Fight for the League of Nations. Cambridge University Press.
- Craig, Douglas B. After Wilson: The Struggle for Control of the Democratic Party, 1920-1934. (U of North Carolina Press, 1993)
- Daniel, Douglass K. "Ohio Newspapers and the “Whispering Campaign” of the 1920 Presidential Election." Journalism History 27.4 (2002): 156-164.
- Degler, Carl N. "American Political Parties and the Rise of the City: An Interpretation" Journal of American History 51#1 (1964), pp. 41–59 DOI: 10.2307/1917933 online
- Duff, John B. (1970). "German-Americans and the Peace, 1918–1920". American Jewish Historical Quarterly. 59 (4): 424–459. ISSN 0002-9068.
- Duff, John B. (1968). "The Versailles Treaty and the Irish-Americans". Journal of American History. 55 (3). Organization of American Historians: 582–598. doi:10.2307/1891015. ISSN 0021-8723. JSTOR 1891015.
- Eldersveld, Samuel J. "The influence of metropolitan party pluralities in presidential elections since 1920: a study of twelve key cities". American Political Science Review 43.6 (1949): 1189–1206.
- Frederick, Richard G. "The Front Porch Campaign and the Election of Harding." in A Companion to Warren G. Harding, Calvin Coolidge, and Herbert Hoover (2014): 94–111.
- Gamm, Gerald H. The making of the New Deal Democrats: Voting behavior and realignment in Boston, 1920-1940 (U of Chicago Press, 1989).
- Gilmore, Glenda E. Gender and Jim Crow: Women and the politics of white supremacy in North Carolina, 1896-1920 (UNC Press Books, 2019).
- Heard, Alexander, and Donald S. Strong. Southern Primary and General Election Data, 1920-1949 (Inter-university Consortium for Political and Social Research, 1984) compendium of county-level votes.
- Janick, Herbert. "Senator Frank B. Brandegee and the Election of 1920." The Historian 35.3 (1973): 434–451. on Connectgicut https://doi.org/10.1111/j.1540-6563.1973.tb00509.x
- Lichtman, Allan J. "The Election of 1920." in A Companion to Woodrow Wilson (2013): 551+ online.
- McCoy, Donald R. (1971). "The Election of 1920". In Schlesinger, Arthur M. Jr.; Israel, Fred L. (eds.). History of American Presidential Elections. New York: Chelsea House. ISBN 0-07-079786-2.
- Morello, John A. (2001). Selling the President, 1920: Albert D. Lasker, Advertising, and the Election of Warren G. Harding. Westport, CT: Praeger. ISBN 0-275-97030-2.
- Orloff, Ann Shola, and Theda Skocpol. "Why not equal protection? Explaining the politics of public social spending in Britain, 1900-1911, and the United States, 1880s-1920." American Sociological Review (1984): 726–750. online
- Ortiz, Paul. Emancipation betrayed: The hidden history of black organizing and white violence in Florida from reconstruction to the bloody election of 1920 (U of California Press, 2005).
- Pietrusza, David (2007). 1920: The Year of the Six Presidents. New York: Carroll & Graf. ISBN 978-0-7867-1622-7.
- Slayton, Robert A. Empire Statesman: The Rise and Redemption of Al Smith. (2001).
- Smith, Jean M. "The Voting Women of San Diego, 1920." Journal of San Diego History 26 (1980): 133–54.
- Terborg-Penn, Rosalyn. African American women in the struggle for the vote, 1850-1920 (Indiana UP, 1998).
- Williams, Brian. "Petticoats in Politics: Cincinnati Women and the 1920 Election." Cincinnati Historical Society Bulletin 35 (1977): 53–70.
