= General Harris =

General Harris may refer to:

== United Kingdom ==
- George Harris (physician) (1856–1931), British Indian Army major general
- George Harris, 1st Baron Harris (1746–1829), British Army lieutenant general
- Ian Harris (British Army officer) (1910–1999), British Army lieutenant general
- William Harris, 2nd Baron Harris (1782–1845), British Army lieutenant general

== United States ==
- David Harris (Illinois politician) (born 1948), Illinois National Guard Adjutant General
- David A. Harris Jr. (fl. 1990s–2020s), U.S. Air Force major general
- Edgar S. Harris Jr. (1925–2018), U.S. Air Force lieutenant general
- Field Harris (1895–1967), U.S. Marine Corps lieutenant general
- Harold D. Harris (1903–1984), U.S. Marine Corps brigadier general
- Harold R. Harris (1895–1988), U.S. Army Air Force brigadier general
- Hugh P. Harris (1909–1979), U.S. Army four-star general
- Hunter Harris Jr. (1909–1987), U.S. Air Force four-star general
- Jeptha Vining Harris (Mississippi general) (1816–1899), Mississippi Militia brigadier general in the American Civil War
- Jerry D. Harris (1980s–2010s), U.S. Air Force lieutenant general
- Marcelite J. Harris (1943–2018), U.S. Air Force major general
- Nathaniel H. Harris (1834–1900), Confederate States Army brigadier general
- Peter Charles Harris (1865–1951), U.S. Army major general
- Stayce Harris (born 1959), U.S. Air Force lieutenant general
- Thomas Alexander Harris (1826–1895), Missouri State Guard (Confederate) brigadier general
- Thomas Maley Harris (1817–1906), Union Army brigadier general and brevet major general
- Walter Alexander Harris (1875–1958), U.S. Army major general
- William Harris (colonist) (1757–1812), Pennsylvania Militia brigadier general

== See also ==
- Attorney General Harris (disambiguation)
