= 1920 Georgia gubernatorial election =

1920 Georgia Democratic gubernatorial primary
- November 2, 1920
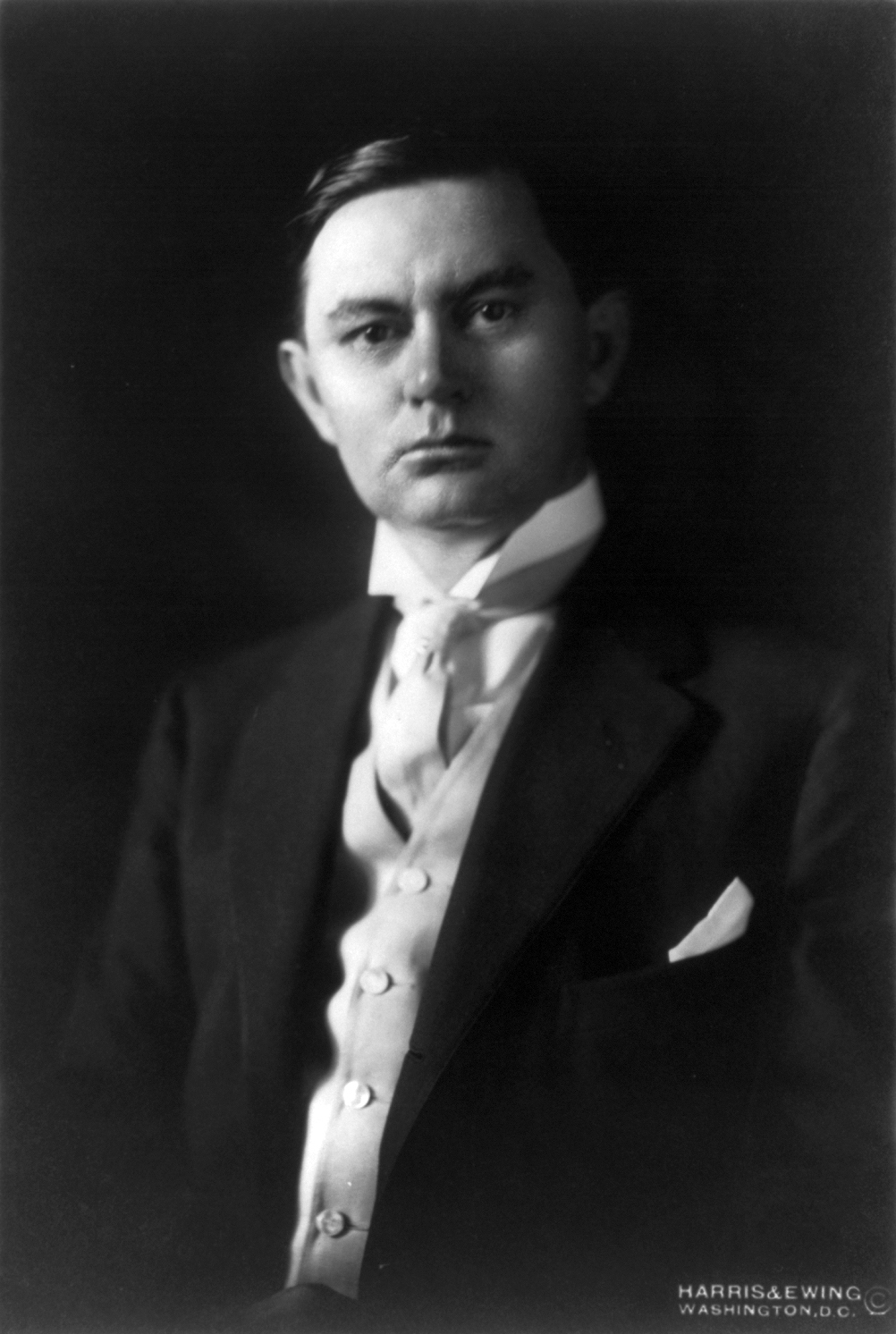

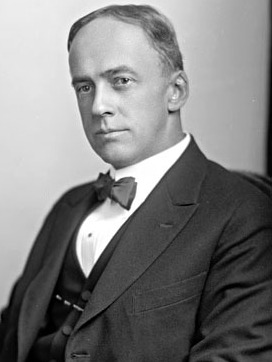
Nominee	Thomas W. Hardwick	Clifford Walker
Party	Democratic	Democratic
Popular vote	84,257	68,234
Percentage	55.25%	44.75%
- County results Hardwick: 50–60% 60–70% 70–80% 80–90% >90% Walker: 50–60% 60–70% 70–80% 80–90% >90% ' No vote
Governor before election
Hugh Dorsey
Democratic
Elected Governor
Thomas W. Hardwick
Democratic

The 1920 Georgia gubernatorial election was held on November 2, 1920, in order to elect the Governor of Georgia. Democratic nominee and former United States Senator from Georgia Thomas W. Hardwick ran unopposed and subsequently won the election.

== Democratic primary ==
The Democratic primary election was held on September 8, 1920. As no candidate won a majority of county unit votes, there was a run-off between the two highest ranking candidates Thomas W. Hardwick and the incumbent Attorney General of Georgia Clifford Walker. Hardwick would eventually win the primary with 55.25% against Walker.

=== Results ===
Candidate	First Round		Run-off	
Candidate	Votes	%	Votes	%
Thomas W. Hardwick	99,210	42.87	84,257	55.25
Clifford Walker	90,738	39.21	68,234	44.75
John N. Holder	37,957	16.40		
Walter R. Brown	3,530	1.53		
Total	231,435	100.00	152,491	100.00

== General election ==
On election day, November 2, 1920, Democratic nominee Thomas W. Hardwick ran unopposed and won the election with 141,681 votes, thereby holding Democratic control over the office of Governor. Hardwick was sworn in as the 63rd Governor of Georgia on June 25, 1921.

=== Results ===
Georgia gubernatorial election, 1920
Party	Candidate	Votes	%
Democratic	Thomas W. Hardwick	141,681	100.00
Total votes		141,681	100.00
Democratic hold			
