= 1924 Georgia gubernatorial election =

- November 4, 1924
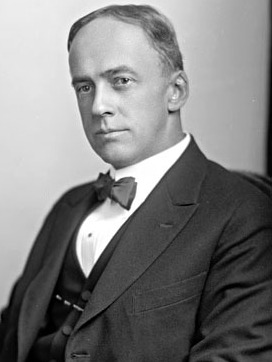
Nominee	Clifford Walker
Party	Democratic
Popular vote	152,367
Percentage	100.00%
- County Results; Walker: 100%
Governor before election
Clifford Walker
Democratic
Elected Governor
Clifford Walker
Democratic

The 1924 Georgia gubernatorial election took place on November 4, 1924, in order to elect the governor of Georgia.

Incumbent Democratic governor Clifford Walker was unopposed in the Democratic primary.

As was common at the time, the Democratic candidate ran unopposed in the general election so therefore the Democratic primary was the real contest, and winning the primary was considered tantamount to election.

== Democratic primary ==
The Democratic primary election was held on September 10, 1924. As Walker was unopposed, there was no run-off.

=== County unit system ===
From 1917 until 1962, the Democratic Party in the U.S. state of Georgia used a voting system called the county unit system to determine victors in statewide primary elections.

The system was ostensibly designed to function similarly to the Electoral College, but in practice the large ratio of unit votes for small, rural counties to unit votes for more populous urban areas provided outsized political influence to the smaller counties.

Under the county unit system, the 159 counties in Georgia were divided by population into three categories. The largest eight counties were classified as "Urban", the next-largest 30 counties were classified as "Town", and the remaining 121 counties were classified as "Rural". Urban counties were given 6 unit votes, Town counties were given 4 unit votes, and Rural counties were given 2 unit votes, for a total of 410 available unit votes. Each county's unit votes were awarded on a winner-take-all basis.

Candidates were required to obtain a majority of unit votes (not necessarily a majority of the popular vote), or 206 total unit votes, to win the election. If no candidate received a majority in the initial primary, a runoff election was held between the top two candidates to determine a winner.

=== Candidates ===
- Clifford Walker, incumbent governor

=== Results ===
Candidate	Popular vote		County unit vote	
Candidate	Votes	%	Votes	%
Clifford Walker	222,395	100.00	412	100.00
Total	222,395	100.00	412	100.00

== General election ==
In the general election, Walker ran unopposed.

=== Results ===
1924 Georgia gubernatorial election
Party	Candidate	Votes	%	±%
Democratic	Clifford Walker (incumbent)	152,367	100.00%	
Turnout		152,367	100.00%	
Democratic hold		Swing		

== Bibliography ==
- Gubernatorial Elections, 1787-1997. Washington, D.C.: Congressional Quarterly Inc. 1998. ISBN 1-56802-396-0.
- Glashan, Roy R. (1979). American Governors and Gubernatorial Elections, 1775-1978. Meckler Books. ISBN 0-930466-17-9.
- Dubin, Michael J. (2013). "Annual Summary". United States Gubernatorial Elections, 1912-1931: The Official Results by State and County. Jefferson, NC: McFarland & Company, Inc. ISBN 9781476601007.
- Compiled by Ruth Blair, ed. (1925). Georgia's Official Register, 1925 (PDF). Atlanta, GA: State of Georgia, Department of Archives and History.
