= 1926 Georgia gubernatorial election =

1926 Georgia Democratic gubernatorial primary runoff
- October 6, 1926

410 county unit votes 206 unit votes needed to win
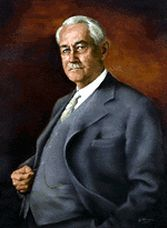

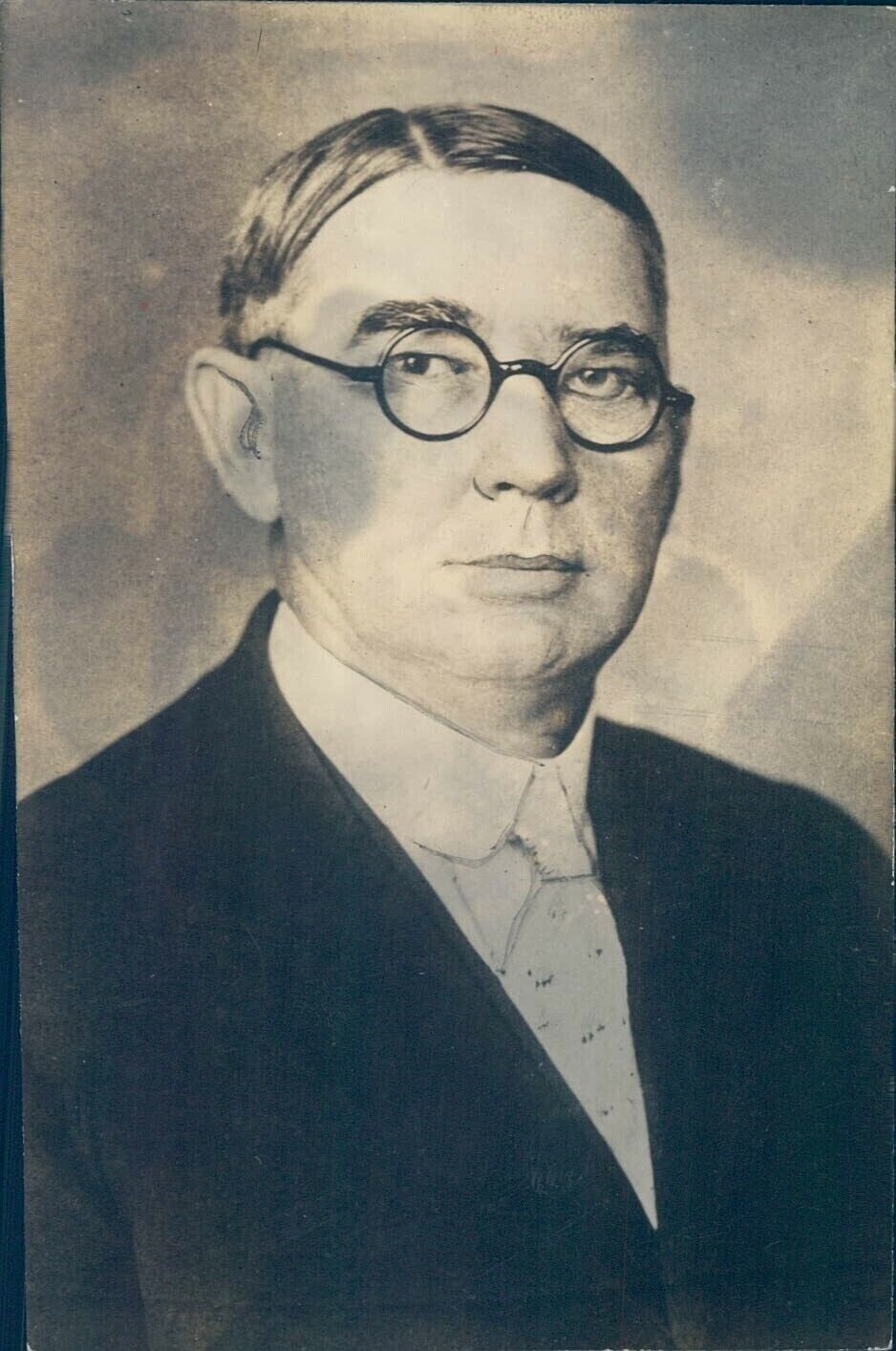
Nominee	Lamartine Griffin Hardman	John N. Holder
Party	Democratic	Democratic
Electoral vote	276	138
Popular vote	80,868	60,197
Percentage	57.33%	42.67%
- County results Hardman: 50–60% 60–70% 70–80% 80–90% Holder: 50–60% 60–70% 70–80% 80–90%
Governor before election
Clifford Walker
Democratic
Elected Governor
Lamartine Griffin Hardman
Democratic

The 1926 Georgia gubernatorial election took place on November 2, 1926, in order to elect the governor of Georgia.

Incumbent Democratic governor Clifford Walker was term-limited, and ineligible to run for a third term.

As was common at the time, the Democratic candidate ran unopposed in the general election so therefore the Democratic primary was the real contest, and winning the primary was considered tantamount to election.

== Democratic primary ==
The Democratic primary election was held on September 8, 1926. As no candidate won a majority of county unit votes, a run-off was held between the top two candidates on October 6, 1926.

=== County unit system ===
From 1917 until 1962, the Democratic Party in the U.S. state of Georgia used a voting system called the county unit system to determine victors in statewide primary elections.

The system was ostensibly designed to function similarly to the Electoral College, but in practice the large ratio of unit votes for small, rural counties to unit votes for more populous urban areas provided outsized political influence to the smaller counties.

Under the county unit system, the 159 counties in Georgia were divided by population into three categories. The largest eight counties were classified as "Urban", the next-largest 30 counties were classified as "Town", and the remaining 121 counties were classified as "Rural". Urban counties were given 6 unit votes, Town counties were given 4 unit votes, and Rural counties were given 2 unit votes, for a total of 410 available unit votes. Each county's unit votes were awarded on a winner-take-all basis.

Candidates were required to obtain a majority of unit votes (not necessarily a majority of the popular vote), or 206 total unit votes, to win the election. If no candidate received a majority in the initial primary, a runoff election was held between the top two candidates to determine a winner.

=== Candidates ===
- George H. Carswell
- Lamartine Griffin Hardman, former state senator and unsuccessful candidate for Democratic nomination for governor in 1914 and 1916
- John N. Holder, chairman of the State Highway Commission
- Joe O. Wood, former state legislator

=== Results ===
Although Holder won a plurality of the popular vote in the first round, Hardman won a plurality of county unit votes. No candidate winning a majority of county unit votes in the first round, meant the election went to a run-off.

Democratic primary
Candidate	Popular vote		County unit vote	
Candidate	Votes	%	Votes	%
Lamartine Griffin Hardman	67,708	35.08	168	40.58
John N. Holder	71,976	37.29	160	38.65
George H. Carswell	32,484	16.83	70	16.91
Joe O. Wood	20,857	10.81	16	3.86
Total	193,025	100.00	414	100.00

Democratic primary runoff
Candidate	Popular vote		County unit vote	
Candidate	Votes	%	Votes	%
Lamartine Griffin Hardman	80,868	57.33	276	66.67
John N. Holder	60,197	42.67	138	33.33
Total	141,065	100.00	414	100.00

== General election ==
In the general election, Hardman ran unopposed.

=== Results ===
1926 Georgia gubernatorial election
Party	Candidate	Votes	%	±%
Democratic	Lamartine Griffin Hardman	47,267 (Note: Some sources indicate Hardman received 47,300 votes.)	100.00%	
Turnout		47,267	100.00%	
Democratic hold		Swing		

== Bibliography ==
- Gubernatorial Elections, 1787-1997. Washington, D.C.: Congressional Quarterly Inc. 1998. ISBN 1-56802-396-0.
- Glashan, Roy R. (1979). American Governors and Gubernatorial Elections, 1775-1978. Meckler Books. ISBN 0-930466-17-9.
- Dubin, Michael J. (2013). "Annual Summary". United States Gubernatorial Elections, 1912-1931: The Official Results by State and County. Jefferson, NC: McFarland & Company, Inc. ISBN 9781476601007.
- Compiled by Ruth Blair, State Historian and Director (1927). Georgia's Official Register, 1927 (PDF). Atlanta, GA: State of Georgia, Department of Archives and History.
