= 1928 Georgia gubernatorial election =

1928 Georgia Democratic gubernatorial primary
- September 12, 1928

410 county unit votes 206 unit votes needed to win
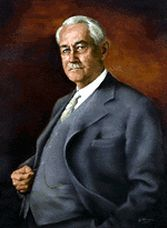

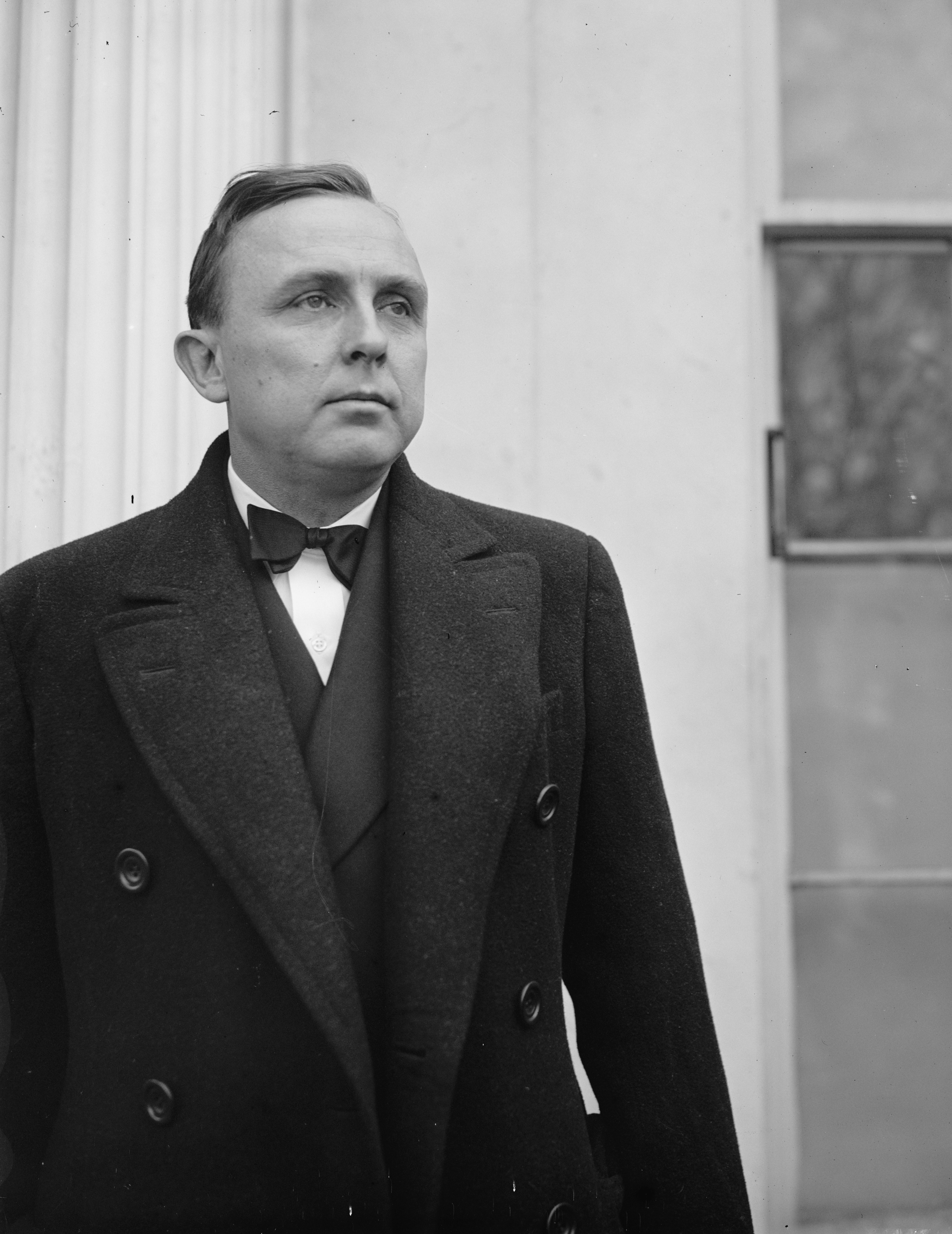
Nominee	Lamartine Griffin Hardman	Eurith D. Rivers
Party	Democratic	Democratic
Electoral vote	310	104
Popular vote	137,430	97,339
Percentage	58.54%	41.46%
- County results Hardman: 50–60% 60–70% 70–80% 80–90% >90% Rivers: 50–60% 60–70% 70–80%
Governor before election
Lamartine Griffin Hardman
Democratic
Elected Governor
Lamartine Griffin Hardman
Democratic

The 1928 Georgia gubernatorial election took place on November 6, 1928, in order to elect the governor of Georgia.

Incumbent Democratic governor Lamartine Griffin Hardman was re-elected to a second term.

As was common at the time, the Democratic candidate ran unopposed in the general election so therefore the Democratic primary was the real contest, and winning the primary was considered tantamount to election.

== Democratic primary ==
The Democratic primary election was held on September 12, 1928. As there were only two candidates, there was no run-off.

=== County unit system ===
From 1917 until 1962, the Democratic Party in the U.S. state of Georgia used a voting system called the county unit system to determine victors in statewide primary elections.

The system was ostensibly designed to function similarly to the Electoral College, but in practice the large ratio of unit votes for small, rural counties to unit votes for more populous urban areas provided outsized political influence to the smaller counties.

Under the county unit system, the 159 counties in Georgia were divided by population into three categories. The largest eight counties were classified as "Urban", the next-largest 30 counties were classified as "Town", and the remaining 121 counties were classified as "Rural". Urban counties were given 6 unit votes, Town counties were given 4 unit votes, and Rural counties were given 2 unit votes, for a total of 410 available unit votes. Each county's unit votes were awarded on a winner-take-all basis.

Candidates were required to obtain a majority of unit votes (not necessarily a majority of the popular vote), or 206 total unit votes, to win the election. If no candidate received a majority in the initial primary, a runoff election was held between the top two candidates to determine a winner.

=== Candidates ===
- Lamartine Griffin Hardman, incumbent governor
- Eurith D. Rivers, State Senator

=== Results ===
Candidate	Popular vote		County unit vote	
Candidate	Votes	%	Votes	%
Lamartine Griffin Hardman (incumbent)	137,430	58.54	310	74.88
Eurith D. Rivers	97,339	41.46	104	25.12
Total	234,769	100.00	414	100.00

== General election ==
In the general election, Hardman ran unopposed.

=== Results ===
1928 Georgia gubernatorial election
Party	Candidate	Votes	%	±%
Democratic	Lamartine Griffin Hardman (incumbent)	202,035 (Note: Some sources indicate Hardman received 203,177 votes.)	100.00%	
Turnout		202,035	100.00%	
Democratic hold		Swing		

== Bibliography ==
- Gubernatorial Elections, 1787-1997. Washington, D.C.: Congressional Quarterly Inc. 1998. ISBN 1-56802-396-0.
- Glashan, Roy R. (1979). American Governors and Gubernatorial Elections, 1775-1978. Meckler Books. ISBN 0-930466-17-9.
- Dubin, Michael J. (2013). "Annual Summary". United States Gubernatorial Elections, 1912-1931: The Official Results by State and County. Jefferson, NC: McFarland & Company, Inc. ISBN 9781476601007.
- Compiled by Ruth Blair, State Historian and Director (1929). Georgia's Official Register, 1929 (PDF). Atlanta, GA: State of Georgia, Department of Archives and History.
