= Attorney General Harris =

Attorney General Harris may refer to:

- Charles Coffin Harris (1822–1881), Attorney General of the Kingdom of Hawaii
- George E. Harris (1827–1911), Attorney General of Mississippi
- Kamala Harris (born 1964), Attorney General of California

== See also ==
- General Harris (disambiguation)
