= National Cotton Council of America =

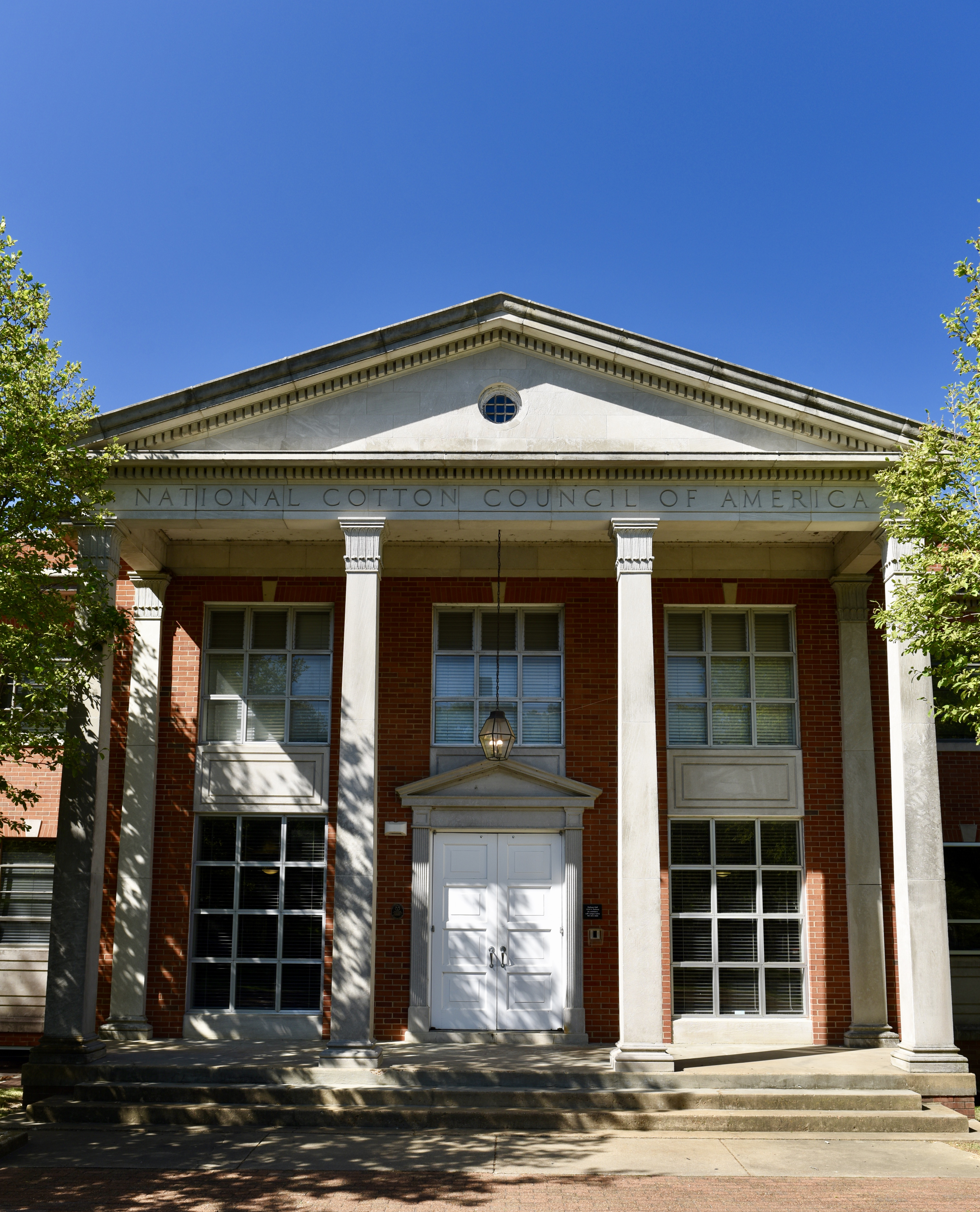
- The National Cotton Council Building
- Formation: 1938
- Founder: Oscar G. Johnston
- Type: Agricultural trade organization
- Headquarters: 7193 Goodlett Farms Parkway; Memphis, Tennessee; United States
- Chairman: Shawn L. Holladay
- Website: cotton.org

The National Cotton Council of America is a trade organization for cotton production in the United States.

== Purpose ==
The main purpose of the organization is to lobby in favor of farm bills agreeable to the cotton industry. Other goals include doing more research to improve cotton growth and promoting it to enhance marketing potential.

== Structure ==
The Board of Directors, comprising thirty-five members, meets annually. Its current Chairman is Shawn L. Holladay.

The council is affiliated with other organizations, such as the American Cotton Producers, Cotton Council International, The Cotton Foundation, the National Cotton Ginners Association, etc.

== History ==
The 1954 Maid of Cotton in Bolivar County

The organization was launched at the Peabody Hotel in Memphis, Tennessee on November 21, 1938, by Oscar G. Johnston. A few months later, in January 1939, the first council meeting took place at the Adolphus Hotel in Dallas, Texas. From 1940 to 1993, it sponsored the Maid of Cotton at the Carnival Memphis in Memphis, Tennessee.

In 1946, the council lobbied in favor of Public Law 733, also known as the 'Agricultural Research and Marketing Act.' Two years later, in 1948, it lobbied Congresspeople from the Cotton Belt in favor of the European Recovery Plan, also known as the Marshall Plan, set to boost the American cotton industry.

In 1950, the Winter Cotton Breeding Nursery was set up in Mexico. Four years later, the council lobbied in favor of adding American cotton to The Agricultural Trade Development and Assistance Act of 1954, which became known as Public Law 480 and created the Food for Peace program within the United States Agency for International Development (USAID). As a result, foreign nations were encouraged to purchase agricultural products from the United States, including cotton.

A year later, in 1955, The Cotton Foundation was established. Its goal is to use donations from industry participants to develop research and education programs for the American cotton industry. That same year, the headquarters of the council was built at 1918 North Parkway in Memphis, Tennessee. In 2008, the Council moved to its current address, 7193 Goodlett Farms Parkway, Cordova, TN 38016. In 1956, the Agricultural Act of 1956 imposed protectionist restrictions on imports of foreign cotton into the United States. Later that year, Cotton Council International was formed; its goal was to assist the Foreign Agricultural Service division of USAID.

In 1960, the Cotton Producers Institute was established to promote research and education about American cotton. Four years later, in 1964, one single system of price was established for American cotton. Two more years later, in 1966, the Research and Promotion Act was passed by Congress and approved by the Senate; it led to the promotion of cotton towards the American consumer.

From 1971 to 1973, the council spearheaded efforts to remove boll weevils from cotton fields in Southern Mississippi, Alabama and Louisiana, leading to greater productivity. A similar effort was implemented in Virginia and North Carolina in 1977. In 1988, the council organized the first annual 'COTTON USA International Seminar' in Monaco.

== See also ==
- Feed sack dress
