= Hosea Abit Nix =

American politician, lawyer

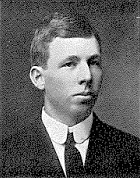
Hosea Abit Nix

Hosea Abit Nix was a Georgia lawyer and politician who ran for Governor of Georgia in 1932 and 1940. He was a member of the Democratic Party.
