= 1919 Baltimore mayoral election =

Baltimore mayoral election, 1919
- May 6, 1919
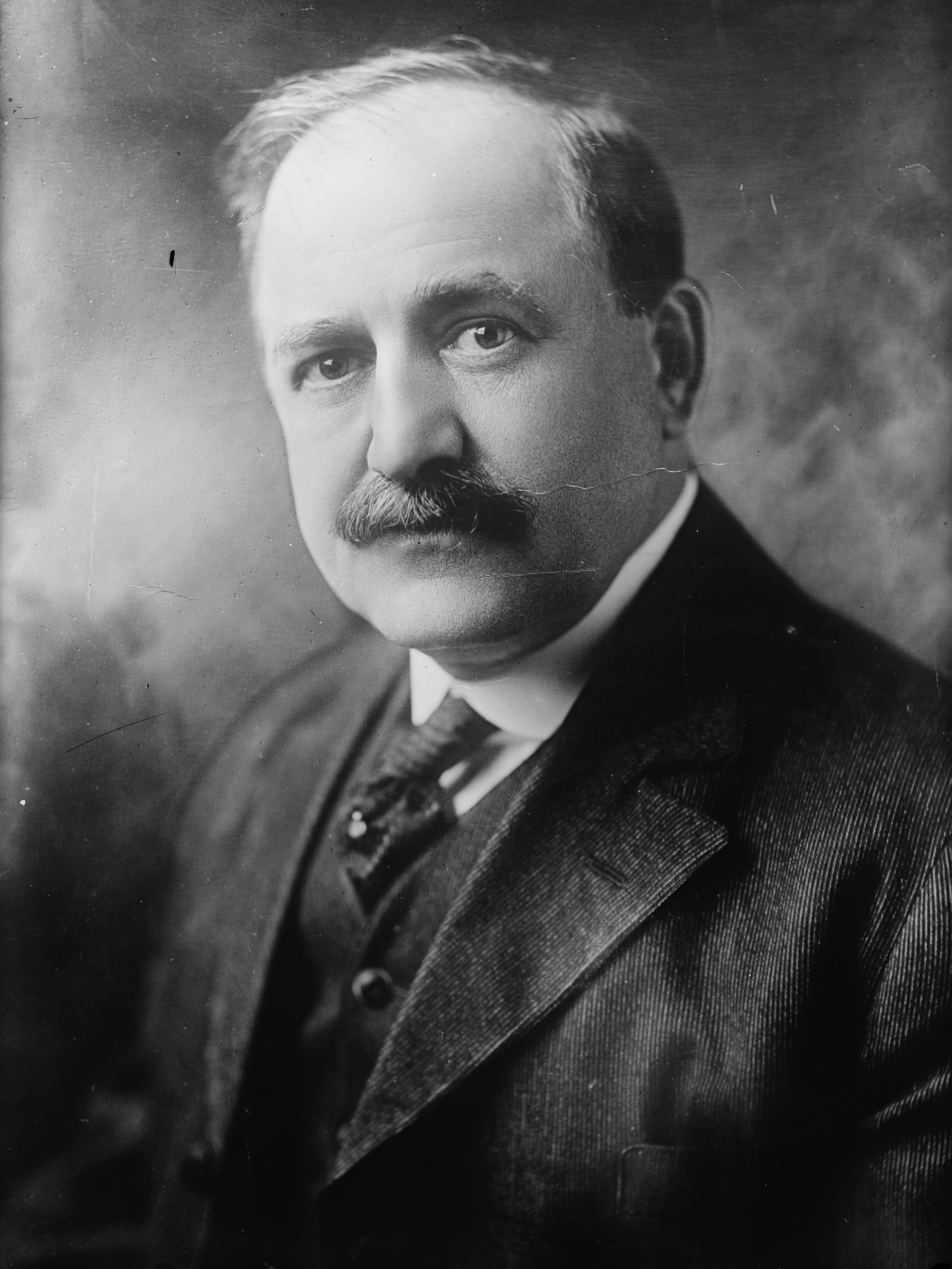

Candidate	William Frederick Broening	George Weems Williams
Party	Republican	Democratic
Popular vote	60,298	51,060
Percentage	54.15%	45.85%
Mayor before election
James H. Preston
Democratic
Elected mayor
William Frederick Broening
Republican

The 1919 Baltimore mayoral election saw the election of William Frederick Broening.

== General election ==
The general election was held May 6.

Baltimore mayoral general election, 1919
Party	Candidate	Votes	%
Republican	William Frederick Broening	60,298	54.15%
Democratic	George Weems Williams	51,060	45.85%
Total votes		111,358	
