= Oscar G. Johnston =

American politician

- c. 1917

Member of the Mississippi House of Representatives from the Coahoma County district
- In office January 1908 – January 1920

Personal details
- Born: January 27, 1880 Jackson, Mississippi, U.S.
- Died: October 3, 1955 (aged 75) Greenville, Mississippi, U.S.
- Party: Democrat
- Spouse: Martha Anderson (m. 1905)

Oscar Goodbar Johnston (January 27, 1880 - October 3, 1955) was an American politician and public officer from the state of Mississippi.

== Early life ==
Oscar Goodbar Johnston was born on January 27, 1880, in Jackson, Mississippi. He was the son of John Calvin Johnston and Emma Elizabeth (Goodbar) Johnston. John Calvin Johnston was the deputy state auditor of Mississippi for several years. When Oscar was in his youth, Oscar attended public and private schools in Jackson, Kansas City, and Memphis. He graduated from the Kentucky Military Institute in 1899 as the salutatorian of his class. He then studied law, going to the University of Mississippi for one term, before switching colleges and graduating from Cumberland University with a law degree and as the class orator in 1901. He first practiced law at West Point, Mississippi, in 1901.

== Political career ==
=== State Legislature ===
Johnston was first elected to the Mississippi House of Representatives, representing Coahoma County as a Democrat, on November 5, 1907. In the 1908 and 1910 sessions, he served on the Judiciary, Federal Relations, Corporations, and Mississippi Levees committees. He was re-elected on November 7, 1911, for the 1912 and 1914 sessions. During those sessions, he was the chairman of the Judiciary committee, and also was served in the Fees and Salaries, Mississippi Levees, Constitution, Drainage, and Rules committees. He was re-elected once more in November 1915, where he served on the Judiciary, Mississippi Levees, Railroads, and Insurance Committees. In the 1916 session, he attempted to run for Speaker of the Mississippi House of Representatives, but lost in a three-way race to Martin Sennett Conner. He left the Legislature to serve in the Tank Corps as a private in World War I, and was commissioned a lieutenant in 1919.

=== Run for Governor ===
Following service in WWI, Johnston attempted to run for Mississippi Governor in 1919. However, he lost the second primary to Lee M. Russell.

== Organizations ==
He became the president of the Delta & Pine Land Company of Mississippi in 1929. In 1933, he was appointed the Director of Finance for the newly created Agricultural Adjustment Administration (AAA). In 1938, he founded the National Cotton Council, and served as president of that organization until his retirement.

== Personal life and death ==
In 1905, he married Martha Anderson. He died on October 3, 1955, in Greenville, Mississippi.
