= Clifford Walker =

American politician (1877–1954)

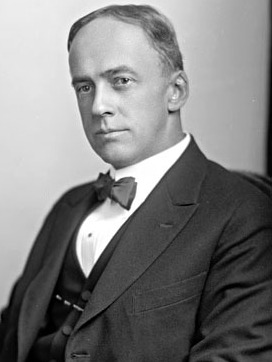
- Walker, 1923–1945

64th Governor of Georgia
- In office June 30, 1923 – June 25, 1927
- Preceded by: Thomas W. Hardwick
- Succeeded by: Lamartine Griffin Hardman

Attorney General of Georgia
- In office 1915–1920
- Governor: Nathaniel Edwin Harris; Hugh Dorsey
- Preceded by: Warren Grice
- Succeeded by: R. A. Denny

Personal details
- Born: Clifford Mitchell Walker; July 4, 1877 Monroe, Georgia, US
- Died: November 9, 1954 (aged 77) Monroe, Georgia, US
- Resting place: Old Baptist Cemetery
- Party: Democratic
- Spouse: Rosa Mathewson
- Education: University of Georgia

Clifford Mitchell Walker (July 4, 1877 – November 9, 1954) was an American attorney and politician from the U.S. state of Georgia.

A graduate of the University of Georgia in 1897, he was a member of the Sigma Alpha Epsilon fraternity.

Walker served consecutive two-year terms as the 64th Governor of Georgia as a Democrat from 1923 to 1927, after winning with the support of the Ku Klux Klan. Walker made few legislative advances during his term as governor, and is largely remembered for his membership in the KKK and his inclusion of KKK leadership in policy matters throughout his term. His additional political service included the office of Mayor of Monroe, Georgia.

Before his gubernatorial terms, Walker served as the state attorney general from 1915 to 1920. He was also a co-founder of the Woodrow Wilson College of Law in Atlanta, Georgia. Walker made the first appointment of a poet laureate of the U.S. state of Georgia, that being Frank Lebby Stanton in 1925.

He was born in Monroe in 1877. Walker died at his home in Monroe in 1954 and was buried in the Old Baptist Cemetery in that same city.

== Notes ==
Party political offices
Preceded by Thomas W. Hardwick	Democratic nominee for Governor of Georgia; 1922, 1924	Succeeded by Lamartine Griffin Hardman
Legal offices
Preceded by Warren Grice	Attorney General of Georgia; 1915–1920	Succeeded by R. A. Denny
Political offices
Preceded by Thomas W. Hardwick	Governor of Georgia; 1923–1927	Succeeded by Lamartine Griffin Hardman
