= 1919 Liechtenstein referendum =

- 2 March 1919

Increasing the number of members of the Landtag from 12 to 17
For	45.17%
Against	54.83%

Lowering the voting age from 24 to 21
For	45.21%
Against	54.79%

A double referendum was held in Liechtenstein on 2 March 1919. Voters were asked whether they approved of increasing the number of directly elected members of the Landtag from 12 to 17, and whether the voting age should be lowered from 24 to 21. Both proposals were rejected by 55% of voters.

== Results ==
Question	For		Against		Invalid/ blank	Total votes	Registered voters	Turnout	Outcome
Question	Votes	%	Votes	%	Invalid/ blank	Total votes	Registered voters	Turnout	Outcome
Increasing the number of members of the Landtag	711	45.17	863	54.83	9	1,583	1,775	89.18	Rejected
Lowering the voting age	712	45.21	863	54.79	8	1,583	1,775	89.18	Rejected
Source: Nohlen & Stöver
