= 1914 Georgia gubernatorial election =

- October 7, 1914
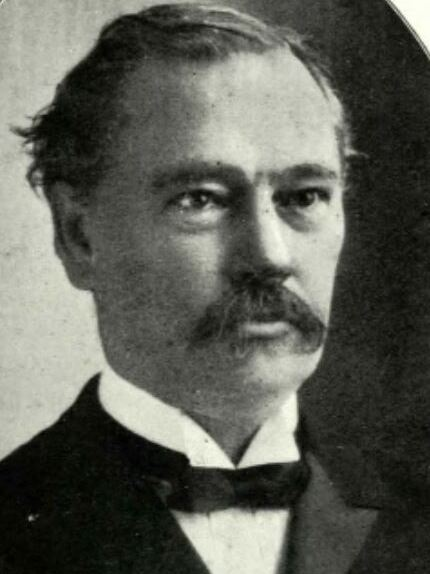
Nominee	Nathaniel Edwin Harris
Party	Democratic
Popular vote	89,976
Percentage	100.00%
Governor before election
John M. Slaton
Democratic
Elected Governor
Nathaniel Edwin Harris
Democratic

The 1914 Georgia gubernatorial election was held on October 7, 1914, in order to elect the Governor of Georgia. Democratic nominee and former member of the Georgia House of Representatives Nathaniel Edwin Harris ran unopposed and subsequently won the election.

== General election ==
On election day, October 7, 1914, Democratic nominee Nathaniel Edwin Harris ran unopposed and won the election with 89,976 votes, thereby holding Democratic control over the office of Governor. Harris was sworn in as the 61st Governor of Georgia on June 26, 1915.

=== Results ===
Georgia gubernatorial election, 1914
Party	Candidate	Votes	%
Democratic	Nathaniel Edwin Harris	89,976	100.00
Total votes		89,976	100.00
Democratic hold			
