= Walter Alexander Harris =

American lawyer and army officer

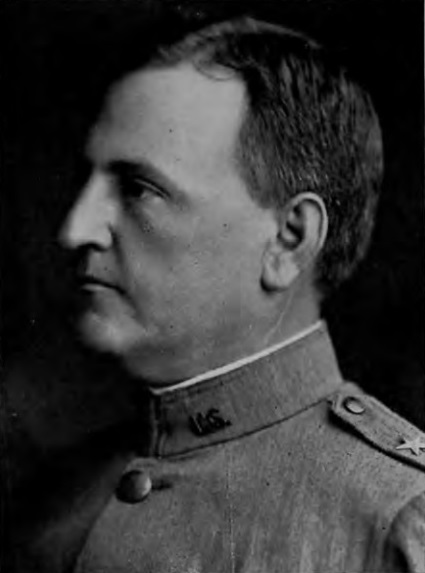
- From 1936's Georgia's Participation in the World War and the History of the Department of Georgia, The American Legion
- Born: November 17, 1875; Macon, Georgia, U.S.
- Died: March 15, 1958 (aged 82); Macon, Georgia, U.S.
- Burial place: Rose Hill Cemetery; Macon, Georgia, U.S.
- Alma mater: University of Georgia (A.B., LL.B., LL.D.)
- Spouse: Emily Williamson (m. 1901; died 1936)
- Military career
- Allegiance: United States
- Branch: United States Army
- Service years: 1898–1919
- Rank: Major General
- Conflicts: World War I
- Other work: Attorney
- Father: Nathaniel Edwin Harris

Walter Alexander Harris (November 17, 1875 – March 15, 1958) was a lawyer, writer, and U.S. Army officer in the early 20th century. He served in World War I, among other conflicts.

== Biography ==
Harris was born in Macon, Georgia, on November 17, 1875, to Nathaniel Edwin Harris. He graduated from the University of Georgia in 1895 with an A.B., and he received an LL.B. in 1896 and an LL.D. in 1928.

Harris entered the Georgia Bar Association in 1896, and he practiced law at the firm Harris, Russel, Weaver, and Watkins, in Macon. He also served on the Bibb County Board of Education from 1905 to 1912. He also was a member of the American Bar Association.

Harris joined the Third Georgia Volunteer Infantry on May 1, 1898. While a private upon joining, he had reached the rank of captain by April 22, 1899. He served in Cuba with the Army of Occupation. Harris commanded the Georgia National Guard on the border with Mexico from 1916 to 1917. He also participated in World War I, commanding the 61st Infantry Brigade in the 31st Infantry Division from 1917 to 1918, and commanding the 31st Division from September 28 to November 14, 1918. He also was the commanding general of the 174th Infantry Brigade in the 87th Infantry Division, returning to the U.S. in the latter command on January 10, 1919. Honorably discharged from the U.S. Army on January 21, 1919, Harris became a major general (retired) in the Georgia National Guard.

In addition to Harris's other positions, he served as the president of the Macon Historical Association and was a commander of the Georgia Department of the American Legion. He researched the Creek Indians. In addition to serving as a trustee of Wesleyan College, he was a Phi Beta Kappa. He wrote two books, Emperor Brim and Here the Creeks Sat Down.

== Personal life ==
Harris married Emily Williamson on January 9, 1901. She died in June 1936. Harris was a member of the Democratic Party and was an Episcopalian and a Kiwanian.
