= 1919 Mississippi gubernatorial election =

1919 Mississippi Democratic gubernatorial primary runoff
- August 26, 1919
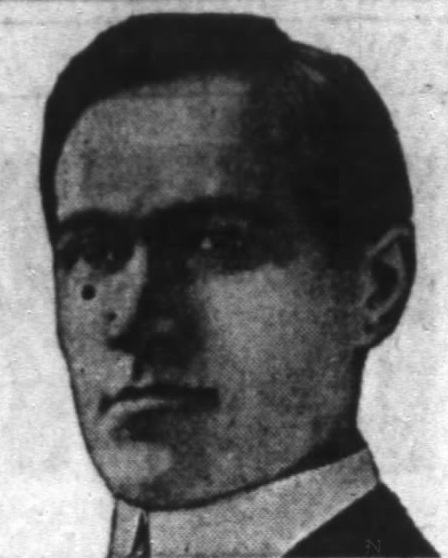

Nominee	Lee M. Russell	Oscar G. Johnston
Party	Democratic	Democratic
Popular vote	77,427	69,565
Percentage	52.67%	47.33%
- County results Russell: 50–60% 60–70% 70–80% Johnston: 50–60% 60–70% 70–80% >90%
Governor before election
Theodore G. Bilbo
Democratic
Elected Governor
Lee M. Russell
Democratic

The 1919 Mississippi gubernatorial election took place on November 4, 1919, in order to elect the Governor of Mississippi. Incumbent Democrat Theodore G. Bilbo was term-limited, and could not run for reelection to a second term. As was common at the time, the Democratic candidate won in a landslide in the general election so therefore the Democratic primary was the real contest, and winning the primary was considered tantamount to election.

== Democratic primary ==
No candidate received a majority in the Democratic primary, which featured 4 contenders, so a runoff was held between the top two candidates. The runoff election was won by Lieutenant Governor Lee M. Russell, who defeated Oscar G. Johnston.

=== Candidates ===
- Ross A. Collins, Attorney General of Mississippi
- Oscar G. Johnston, State Representative from Coahoma County
- Andrew H. Longino, former Governor
- Lee M. Russell, Lieutenant Governor of Mississippi

=== Results ===
Mississippi Democratic gubernatorial primary, 5 August 1919
Party	Candidate	Votes	%
Democratic	Lee M. Russell	48,348	32.58
Democratic	Oscar G. Johnston	39,206	26.42
Democratic	Andrew H. Longino	30,831	20.77
Democratic	Ross A. Collins	30,026	20.23
Total votes		148,411	100.00

=== Runoff ===
Mississippi Democratic gubernatorial primary runoff, 26 August 1919
Party	Candidate	Votes	%
Democratic	Lee M. Russell	77,427	52.67
Democratic	Oscar G. Johnston	69,565	47.33
Total votes		146,992	100.00

== General election ==
In the general election, Russell easily defeated Socialist candidate J. T. Lester, who was also the party's nominee in 1915.

=== Results ===
Mississippi gubernatorial election, 1919
Party	Candidate	Votes	%
Democratic	Lee M. Russell	39,241	96.96
Socialist	J. T. Lester	1,231	3.04
Total votes		40,472	100.00
Democratic hold			
