= Nathaniel Edwin Harris =

American politician

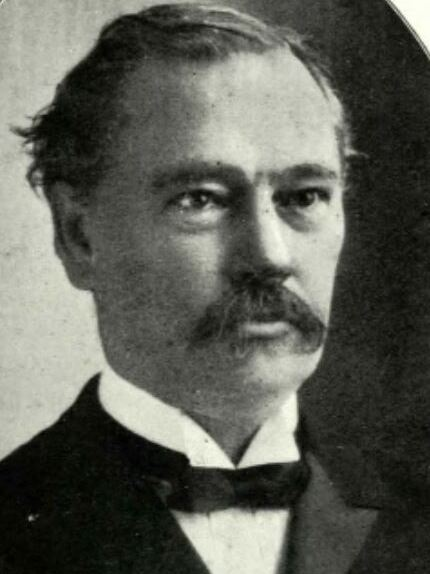

61st Governor of Georgia
- In office June 26, 1915 – June 30, 1917
- Preceded by: John M. Slaton
- Succeeded by: Hugh Dorsey

Member of the Georgia House of Representatives
- In office 1882-1885

Personal details
- Born: January 21, 1846 Jonesborough, Tennessee, U.S.
- Died: September 21, 1929 (aged 83) Hampton, Tennessee, U.S.
- Resting place: Rose Hill Cemetery
- Party: Democratic
- Spouses: Fannie Burke (m. 1873) Hattie Gibson Jobe (m. 1899)
- Children: 7, including Walter A. Harris
- Education: University of Georgia (BA)
- Occupation: Lawyer

Military service
- Branch/service: Confederate States Army
- Unit: 16th Virginia Cavalry Regiment
- Battles/wars: American Civil War

Nathaniel Edwin Harris (January 21, 1846 – September 21, 1929) was an American lawyer and politician, and the 61st governor of Georgia.

== Early life ==
Harris was born in Jonesboro, Tennessee on January 21, 1846, to Edna (née Haynes) and Alexander Nelson Harris. His father was a physician and Methodist minister. He moved to Georgia during the American Civil War to escape Union troops. At the age of sixteen, he joined the infantry of the Confederate States Army and served until the end of the American Civil War eventually becoming an officer in the 16th Virginia Cavalry Regiment. After the war, he returned to his family's home in Tennessee; however, they soon moved to Bartow County, Georgia. In 1867, Harris attended the University of Georgia (UGA) in Athens, was a member of Chi Phi fraternity and the Phi Kappa Literary Society, and graduated in 1870 with a B.A. degree. In 1889, he became a UGA trustee and served on that board until his death.

After graduating college, Harris taught school for two years, studied law, and gained admittance to the state bar. He moved to Macon, Georgia in 1873. He joined with future UGA chancellor Walter Barnard Hill to form the law firm of Hill and Harris. From 1874 to 1882, he also served as the Macon city attorney.

== Personal life ==
Harris married Fannie Burke of Macon in 1873. He later married Hattie Gibson Jobe of Elizabethton, Tennessee in 1899. He had seven children with his first wife, including General Walter A. Harris.

== Political life and the formation of the Georgia Institute of Technology ==
The founding of the Georgia School of Technology I regard as the most important event, of a public nature, that occurred in my life.

— Nathaniel E. Harris, Autobiography, 1925

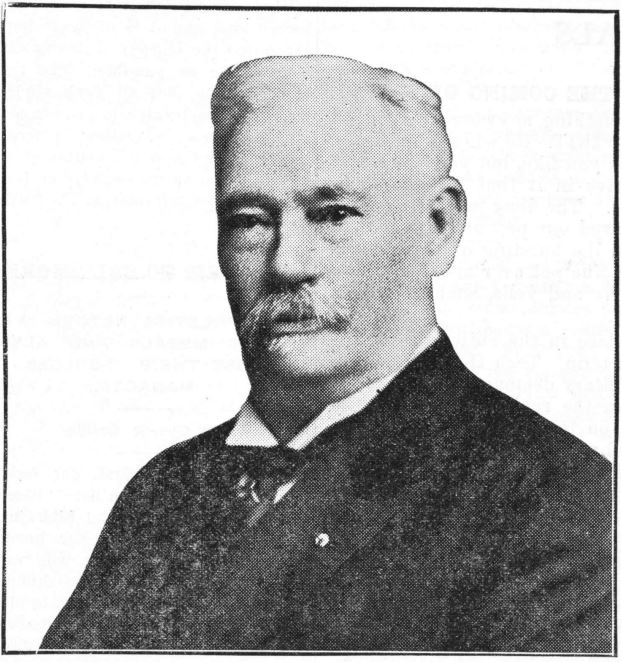
Harris in 1918

Harris was elected to the Georgia House of Representatives in 1882 as a representative of Bibb County and was reelected through 1885. His campaign platform when running was the establishment of a technological college. As a state representative in 1882, Harris introduced the bill to establish the Georgia Institute of Technology (originally called the Georgia School of Technology until assuming its current name in 1948). That bill was approved by the Georgia General Assembly on October 13, 1885, after failing to pass through the legislature in 1883 and again in 1884. Harris received public support in this matter from Henry W. Grady and John Fletcher Hanson.

The bill called for Governor Henry Dickerson McDaniel to appoint a five-member commission to select the location of the new school and organize it. Harris was named to that group as chairman alongside Samuel N. Inman from Atlanta as the treasurer, Oliver S. Porter from Newnan, Georgia, Edward R. Hodgson Sr. from Athens, and Judge Columbus Heard from Greene County, Georgia.

Meeting in Atlanta on October 19, 1886, the committee took 23 separate ballots amongst themselves before selecting Atlanta for the school's location over Macon, Milledgeville, Athens and Penfield. Harris, Hodgson and Inman voted for their cities of residence on every ballot with Porter and Heard voting for Atlanta on the last ballot to give that city a majority. Harris was named the president of the school's Board of Trustees, and he served in that position the rest of his life.

Elected to the Georgia Senate from 1894 to 1895, Harris then served as judge of the Superior Court of the Macon Circuit from 1912 until his resignation in 1915 to successfully run for Governor of Georgia. He was sworn in on June 26, 1915, and served until 1917 being the last governor of Georgia born outside the state of Georgia. During his tenure, Harris was noted for signing Prohibition into state law. He returned to his Macon law practice after his gubernatorial term and served as Pension Commissioner of Georgia from 1924 to 1925 in addition to being president of the Electoral College of Georgia.

Harris was a first cousin of Alfred Alexander Taylor and Robert Love Taylor, both of whom were United States Congressmen from, and Governors of, Tennessee.

== Death ==
Harris died at his summer home in Hampton, Tennessee on September 21, 1929 and was buried in Rose Hill Cemetery in Macon.

== See also ==
- History of Georgia Tech

Party political offices
Preceded by John M. Slaton	Democratic nominee for Governor of Georgia; 1914	Succeeded by Hugh Dorsey
Political offices
Preceded by John M. Slaton	Governor of Georgia; June 26, 1915 – 1917	Succeeded by Hugh Dorsey
