= Thomas W. Hardwick =

American politician (1872–1944)

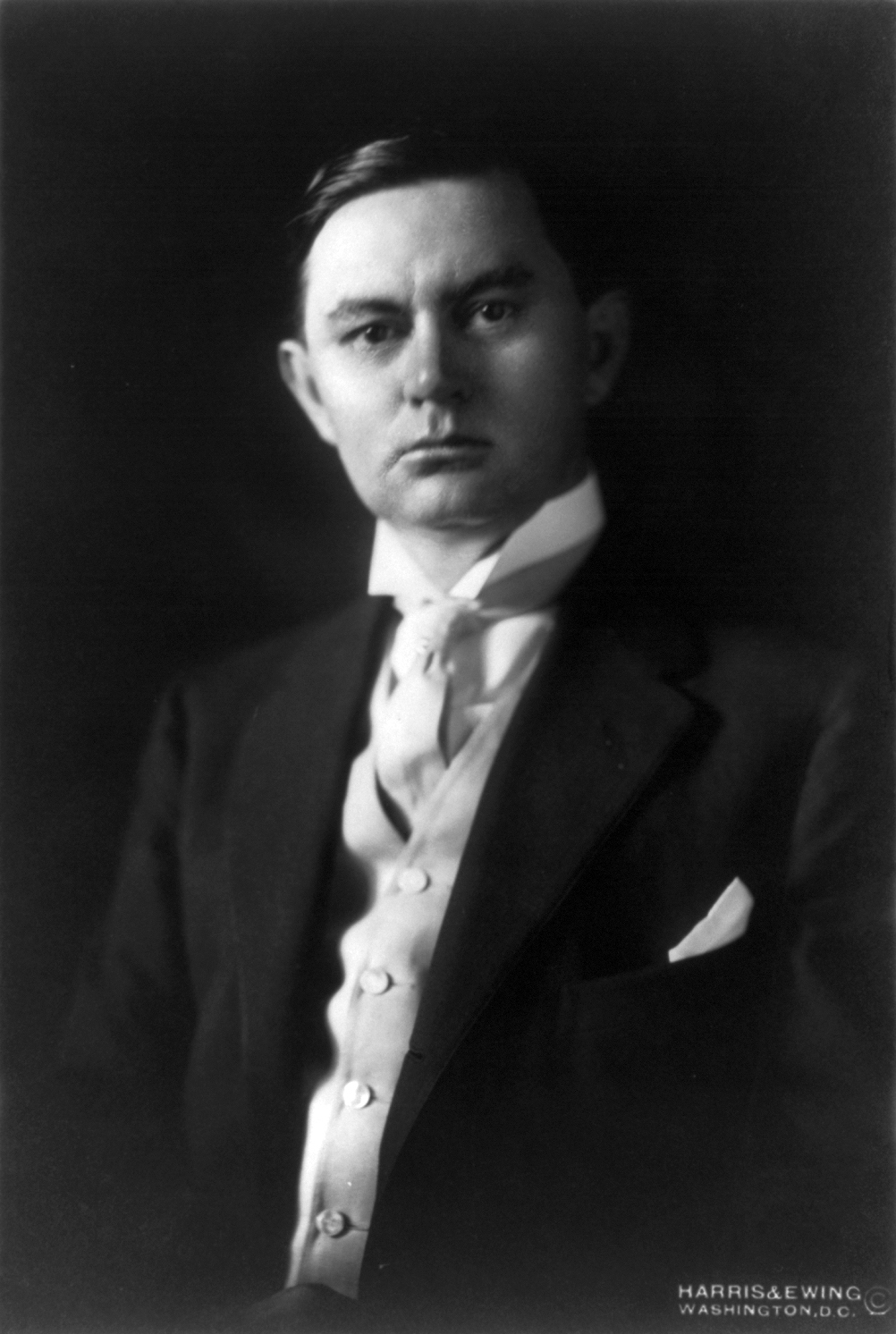
- Hardwick, c. 1912

63rd Governor of Georgia
- In office June 25, 1921 – June 30, 1923
- Preceded by: Hugh Dorsey
- Succeeded by: Clifford Walker

United States Senator from Georgia
- In office November 4, 1914 – March 3, 1919
- Preceded by: William Stanley West
- Succeeded by: William J. Harris

Member of the U.S. House of Representatives from Georgia's 10th district
- In office March 4, 1903 – November 2, 1914
- Preceded by: Emory Speer
- Succeeded by: Carl Vinson

Member of the Georgia House of Representatives
- In office January 19, 1898 – February 9, 1902

Personal details
- Born: Thomas William Hardwick; December 9, 1872 Thomasville, Georgia, U.S.
- Died: January 31, 1944 (aged 71) Sandersville, Georgia, U.S.
- Resting place: Old City Cemetery; Sandersville, Georgia, U.S.
- Party: Democratic
- Spouses: Maude Elizabeth Perkins (m. 1894; died 1937) Sallie Warren West (m. 1938)
- Education: Mercer University (BA); University of Georgia School of Law (JD)

Thomas William Hardwick (December 9, 1872 – January 31, 1944) was an American politician from the U.S. state of Georgia who served as governor of Georgia, a United States senator from Georgia, a member of the United States House of Representatives from Georgia, and a member of the Georgia House of Representatives.

== Early life ==
Hardwick was born on December 9, 1872, in Thomasville, Georgia. He graduated from Mercer University with a Bachelor of Arts degree in 1892 and received a Juris Doctor degree from the University of Georgia School of Law in 1893. He was an active member of Phi Delta Theta at Mercer, and while at UGA, he was a member of the Phi Kappa Literary Society.

== Personal life ==
Hardwick married Maude Elizabeth Perkins in 1894. He married Sallie Warren West in 1938 after Maude's death in 1937. He had one daughter and two stepdaughters.

== Career ==
=== Law career ===
Hardwick practiced law in Savannah and then entered politics with the support of Thomas E. Watson. Hardwick was the prosecutor of Washington County, Georgia, from 1895 to 1897.

=== Political career ===
Hardwick served as a member of the Georgia House of Representatives from 1898 to 1902; and a member of the United States House of Representatives representing Georgia's 10th district from 1903 to 1914. He introduced resolutions for the repeal of the Fourteenth and Fifteenth amendments.

In 1914 he ran for a seat in the United States Senate in a special election for the unexpired term of Augustus O. Bacon who had died in office. Hardwick won, and served in the Senate from 1915 to 1919. Senator Hardwick was defeated in the Democratic primary for reelection in 1918 by William J. Harris.

==== Anarchist bombings ====
As a senator, Hardwick co-sponsored the Immigration Act of 1918, which was enacted in October of that year. Aimed at radical anarchists who had immigrated to the U.S., the new law enabled deportation of any non-citizen who belonged to an anarchist organization or who was found in possession of anarchist literature for the purpose of propaganda.

On April 29, 1919, as a direct result of his sponsorship of the Immigration Act, Senator Hardwick was targeted for assassination by adherents of the radical anarchist Luigi Galleani, who mailed a booby trap bomb to his residence in Georgia. The bomb exploded when Ethel Williams, a house servant of the Hardwicks, attempted to open the package, blowing off her hands and severely injuring Hardwick's wife, Maude.

=== Governor (1921–1923) ===
Hardwick then served as Governor of Georgia from 1921 to 1923, and due to his opposition to the Ku Klux Klan, lost to Clifford Walker in the subsequent election. While standing unsuccessfully for re-nomination in 1922, Hardwick described his rival Clifford Walker as the Ku Klux Klan's candidate and being supported by the "radical union labor element."

He ran unsuccessfully for election to the Senate in 1922 and 1924, and then retired from politics. He spent the rest of his life practicing law, with offices in Washington, D.C., Atlanta, Georgia, and Sandersville, Georgia.

One of Hardwick's most notable actions as governor of Georgia was his appointment of Rebecca Latimer Felton to the United States Senate as a temporary replacement for Tom Watson, who had died. Though Felton only served for one day, she was the first woman to serve in the Senate.

Hardwick was associated with progressivism earlier in his political career, but by the time he served as governor of Georgia he had moved towards conservatism; denouncing what he regarded as paternalism and proclaiming his belief that "God helps those who help themselves." After his death, one journal said of Hardwick that he was "essentially a conservative, distrustful of reformers, and extremely jealous of states rights."

== Death ==
Hardwick died of a heart attack on January 31, 1944, in Sandersville. Hardwick was interred in Old City Cemetery in Sandersville.

== See also ==
- 1919 United States anarchist bombings

== Notes ==
Party political offices
Preceded by Augustus Octavius Bacon	Democratic nominee for U.S. Senator from Georgia (Class 2); 1914	Succeeded by William J. Harris
Preceded by Hugh Dorsey	Democratic nominee for Governor of Georgia; 1920	Succeeded by Clifford Walker
U.S. House of Representatives
Preceded by William H. Fleming	Member of the U.S. House of Representatives from Georgia's 10th congressional district March 4, 1903 – November 2, 1914	Succeeded by Carl Vinson
U.S. Senate
Preceded by William S. West	U.S. Senator (Class 2) from Georgia; November 4, 1914 – March 3, 1919	Succeeded by William J. Harris
Political offices
Preceded by Hugh Dorsey	Governor of Georgia; 1921–1923	Succeeded by Clifford Walker
