= Hugh Dorsey =

American politician

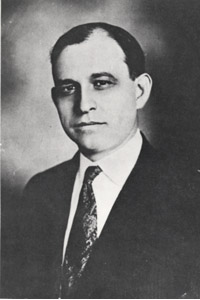

62nd Governor of Georgia
- In office June 30, 1917 – June 25, 1921
- Preceded by: Nathaniel Edwin Harris
- Succeeded by: Thomas W. Hardwick

Judge of the Georgia Superior Courts in the Atlanta Judicial Circuit
- In office 1935–1948

Personal details
- Born: Hugh Manson Dorsey; July 10, 1871 Fayetteville, Georgia, U.S.
- Died: June 11, 1948 (aged 76) Atlanta, Georgia, U.S.
- Resting place: Westview Cemetery
- Party: Democratic
- Spouse: Adair Wilkinson (m. 1911)
- Children: 2
- Education: University of Georgia (AB); University of Virginia
- Occupation: Lawyer; politician

Hugh Manson Dorsey (July 10, 1871 – June 11, 1948) was an American lawyer from Georgia. He was the prosecuting attorney in Leo Frank's wrongful prosecution in 1913 that subsequently led to a lynching after Frank's death sentence was reduced to life imprisonment. He was also a politician, a member of the Democratic Party, who was twice elected as the governor of Georgia (1917–1921) and jurist who served for more than a decade as a superior court judge (1935–1948) in Atlanta.

== Early life and education ==
Hugh Manson Dorsey was born in Fayetteville, Georgia, on July 10, 1871, to Sarah Matilda (née Bennett) and Rufus T. Dorsey. At the age of 8, he moved with his family in 1879 to Atlanta. His father was a judge and after moving to Atlanta formed the firm Wright and Dorsey with Judge William Wright. Dorsey attended local Atlanta schools. He attended school for a year in Hartwell, Georgia, before returning to Atlanta.

Dorsey graduated from the University of Georgia in 1893 with a Bachelor of Arts. After studying law at the University of Virginia, he was admitted to the bar in Fayetteville.

== Personal life ==
Dorsey married Adair Wilkinson of Valdosta, Georgia, on June 29, 1911. Together, they had two sons, Hugh Manson Dorsey Jr. and James Wilkinson Dorsey.

Dorsey's sister, Sarah, married Luther Rosser Jr., son of attorney Luther Rosser, who was chief counsel defending Leo Frank at trial and subsequent appeals.

== Career ==
Dorsey joined his father's law firm in Atlanta in 1895. He was made a partner along with Arthur Heyman and the firm became Dorsey, Brewster, Howell and Heyman. After his father died in 1909, Dorsey became the head of the firm and remained until he withdrew from the partnership in August 1916.

After working for several years with his father, in 1910, Dorsey was appointed solicitor general of the Atlanta Judicial Circuit by Governor Joseph M. Brown after the death of Charles D. Hill. He was a member of the Democratic Party, as were most established Whites in the South after Reconstruction.

In 1913, Dorsey was prosecuting attorney (serving as the solicitor general of the Fulton County Superior Court) at the trial of Leo Frank, who was indicted for the murder of young factory worker Mary Phagan. Historians widely agree that Frank was wrongly convicted in an unfair trial. Some historians claimed that Dorsey was under pressure for a quick conviction because of recent unsolved murders and made a premature decision that Frank was guilty, a decision that his personal ambition would not allow him to reconsider. It is alleged that Dorsey "suppressed evidence" favorable to Frank, intimidated and bribed witnesses, "drilled [witness] Conley in false testimony", "may have lacked the moral strength to back down" as contradictory evidence was uncovered, and feared that if he reversed himself he would have "ruined his career" and be accused of "having sold out to the Jews." Historian Leonard Dinnerstein wrote, "He had recently prosecuted two important accused murderers and had failed each time to convict them." A local newspaper said another failure would be "the end of Mr. Dorsey as solicitor." "Among reporters, the consensus was that the Phagan prosecution represented nothing less than a last chance for him."

Achieving conviction amid intense media coverage, Dorsey became famous. Frank, a Jewish northerner from Brooklyn, was eventually lynched by a mob two months after Governor John Slaton commuted his death sentence to life in prison.

Dorsey's victory in the Frank-Phagan case contributed to his political popularity. He resigned as solicitor general on August 1, 1916. He was elected for two consecutive two-year terms as the Governor of Georgia from 1917 to 1921. During his tenure, a number of progressive reforms were carried out.

Subsequent to the 1921 Williams Plantation Murders, and the trials of John S. Williams and Clyde Manning, Dorsey gave a speech on April 22, 1921 titled "A Statement from Governor Hugh M. Dorsey as to the Negro in Georgia." It was near the end of his final term as governor; he had also just badly lost a race for the U.S. Senate to his former ally Tom Watson, by that point a vocal white supremacist. Dorsey's speech recited a list of abuses by Georgia whites against African Americans: lynchings, banishments, slavery-like peonage, and physical cruelty. "To me it seems that we stand indicted as a people before the world," he said. "If these charges should continue, both God and man would justly condemn Georgia more severely than man and God have condemned Belgium and Leopold for the Congo atrocities." Dosey subsequently reiterated his position in a small pamphlet, published as The Negro in Georgia.

These were astonishing admissions from any white Democratic governor in the Jim Crow South — much less one who'd made his name with the Leo Frank prosecution. His already-elected successor, Thomas W. Hardwick, called it "an infamous slander on the State." Historians have debated Dorsey's motivations — from an honest desire for reform to slowing the early stages of the Great Migration to improving Georgia's perception in the eyes of Northern capitalists.

In 1926, he was appointed judge of the civil division in Atlanta. Dorsey served as a superior court judge in Atlanta from 1935 to March 4, 1948. He served on the Atlanta Judicial Circuit.

== Death and legacy ==
Dorsey died on June 11, 1948, in a hospital in Atlanta and was buried at the city's Westview Cemetery. His grandson, Jaz Dorsey, was a composer, lyricist and playwright.

Over the decades, the dramatic story of Frank's trial and lynching (after his death sentence was commuted) was adapted into many forms. He is seen in the 1964 fiction Profiles in Courage and 1988 TV-miniseries The Murder of Mary Phagan, where Dorsey was portrayed by the actor Richard Jordan, and in the Broadway musical Parade, where he was portrayed in the original cast by Herndon Lackey.

Dorsey's involvement in the Williams Plantation Murders was documented in two books, Lay This Body Down by Gregory A. Freeman (1999) and Hell Put to Shame by Earl Swift (2024).

Party political offices
Preceded by Nathaniel Edwin Harris	Democratic nominee for Governor of Georgia; 1916, 1918	Succeeded by Thomas W. Hardwick
Political offices
Preceded by Nathaniel E. Harris	Governor of Georgia; 1917–1921	Succeeded by Thomas W. Hardwick
