= List of elections in 1912 =

The following elections occurred in the year 1912.

== Asia ==
- 1912 Chinese provisional presidential election
- 1912 Chinese National Assembly election (first election for the newly founded National Assembly of the Republic of China)
- 1912 Hong Kong sanitary board election
- 1912 Japanese general election
- 1912 Philippine Assembly elections
- 1912 Ottoman general election
- 1912 Russian legislative election

== Europe ==
- 1912 Belgian general election
- 1912 Faroese general election
- 1912 German federal election
- 1912 Greek parliamentary election
- 1912 Liechtenstein local elections
- 1912 Monegasque general election
- 1912 Norwegian parliamentary election
- 1912 Ottoman general election
- 1912 Romanian general election
- 1912 Russian legislative election
- 1912 San Marino general election
- 1912 Serbian parliamentary election

=== United Kingdom ===
- 1912 Bolton by-election
- 1912 Bow and Bromley by-election
- 1912 Carmarthen District by-election
- 1912 Crewe by-election
- 1912 East Carmarthenshire by-election
- 1912 Edinburgh East by-election
- 1912 Epsom by-election
- 1912 Forest of Dean by-election
- 1912 Glasgow St Rollox by-election
- 1912 Hackney South by-election
- 1912 Hanley by-election
- 1912 Hereford by-election
- 1912 Holmfirth by-election
- 1912 Hythe by-election
- 1912 Ilkeston by-election
- 1912 Leominster by-election
- 1912 Manchester North West by-election
- 1912 Manchester South by-election
- 1912 Midlothian by-election
- 1912 North West Norfolk by-election
- 1912 Nottingham East by-election
- 1912 South East Essex by-election
- 1912 Taunton by-election

== North America ==
=== Canada ===
- 1912 British Columbia general election
- December 1912 Edmonton municipal election
- 1912 Edmonton municipal by-election
- February 1912 Edmonton municipal election
- 1912 New Brunswick general election
- 1912 Prince Edward Island general election
- 1912 Quebec general election
- 1912 Saskatchewan general election
- 1912 Toronto municipal election
- 1912 Yukon general election

=== Caribbean ===
- 1912 Cuban general election
- 1912 Dominican Republic general election

=== United States ===
- 1912 New York state election
- 1912 United States elections
- 1912 United States presidential election

==== United States lieutenant gubernatorial ====
- 1912 Connecticut lieutenant gubernatorial election
- 1912 Illinois lieutenant gubernatorial election
- 1912 Minnesota lieutenant gubernatorial election
- 1912 Missouri lieutenant gubernatorial election
- 1912 Nebraska lieutenant gubernatorial election
- 1912 Texas lieutenant gubernatorial election
- 1912 Wisconsin lieutenant gubernatorial election

==== United States gubernatorial ====
- 1912 Arkansas gubernatorial election
- 1912 Colorado gubernatorial election
- 1912 Connecticut gubernatorial election
- 1912 Delaware gubernatorial election
- 1912 Florida gubernatorial election
- 1912 Georgia gubernatorial election
- 1912 Georgia gubernatorial special election
- 1912 Idaho gubernatorial election
- 1912 Illinois gubernatorial election
- 1912 Indiana gubernatorial election
- 1912 Kansas gubernatorial election
- 1912 Louisiana gubernatorial election
- 1912 Maine gubernatorial election
- 1912 Massachusetts gubernatorial election
- 1912 Michigan gubernatorial election
- 1912 Minnesota gubernatorial election
- 1912 Missouri gubernatorial election
- 1912 Montana gubernatorial election
- 1912 Nebraska gubernatorial election
- 1912 New Hampshire gubernatorial election
- 1912 New York gubernatorial election
- 1912 North Carolina gubernatorial election
- 1912 North Dakota gubernatorial election
- 1912 Ohio gubernatorial election
- 1912 Rhode Island gubernatorial election
- 1912 South Carolina gubernatorial election
- 1912 South Dakota gubernatorial election
- 1912 Tennessee gubernatorial election
- 1912 Texas gubernatorial election
- 1912 United States gubernatorial elections
- 1912 Utah gubernatorial election
- 1912 Vermont gubernatorial election
- 1912 Washington gubernatorial election
- 1912 West Virginia gubernatorial election
- 1912 Wisconsin gubernatorial election

==== United States House of Representatives ====
- 1912 United States House of Representatives elections
- 1912 United States House of Representatives election in Arizona
- 1912 United States House of Representatives elections in California
- 1912 United States House of Representatives elections in Oklahoma
- 1912 United States House of Representatives elections in South Carolina

==== United States Senate ====
- 1911–12 United States Senate elections
- 1912–13 United States Senate elections
- 1912 United States Senate elections in Arizona
- 1912 United States Senate election in Kentucky

==== United States mayoral elections ====
- 1912 Manchester, New Hampshire mayoral election
- 1912 Milwaukee mayoral election

== South America ==
- 1912 Argentine legislative election
- 1912 Bolivian legislative election
- 1912 Chilean parliamentary election
- 1912 Ecuadorian presidential election
- 1912 Peruvian presidential election

== Oceania ==
=== Australia ===
- 1912 Alexandria state by-election
- 1912 Queensland state election
- 1912 South Australian state election
- 1912 Tasmanian state election
- 1912 Werriwa by-election

=== New Zealand ===
- 1912 Egmont by-election

== See also ==
- Category:1912 elections
