= 1914 Wisconsin gubernatorial election =

- November 3, 1914
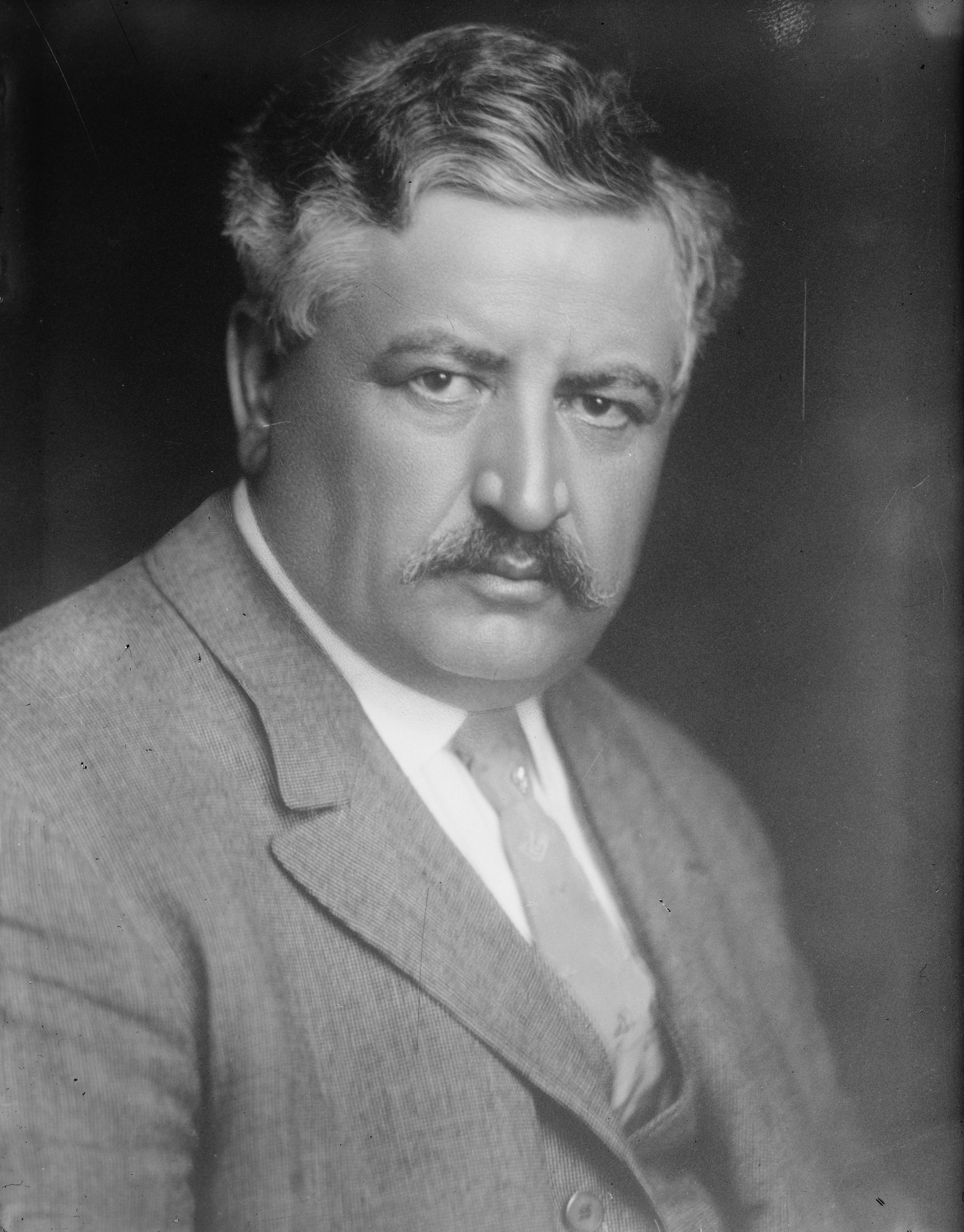

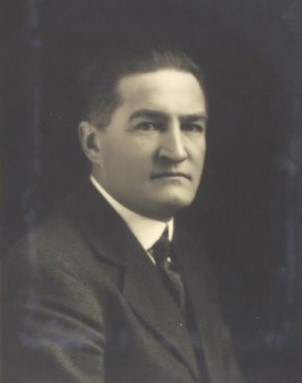

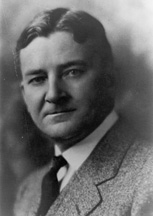

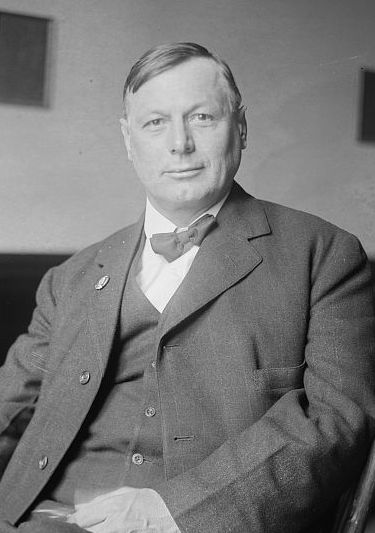
Nominee	Emanuel Lorenz Philipp	John C. Karel
Party	Republican	Democratic
Popular vote	140,787	119,509
Percentage	43.26%	36.72%
Nominee	John J. Blaine	Oscar Ameringer
Party	Progressive	Social-Democratic
Popular vote	32,560	25,917
Percentage	10.01%	7.96%
- County results Philipp: 30–40% 40–50% 50–60% 60–70% 70–80% Karel: 30–40% 40–50% 50–60% 60–70%
Governor before election
Francis E. McGovern
Republican
Elected Governor
Emanuel L. Philipp
Republican

The 1914 Wisconsin gubernatorial election was held on November 3, 1914. Primary elections were held on September 1, 1914.

Incumbent Republican Governor Francis E. McGovern retired to run for U.S. Senate.

Republican nominee Emanuel L. Philipp defeated Democratic nominee John C. Karel, Progressive nominee John J. Blaine and Social Democratic nominee Oscar Ameringer, with 43.26% of the vote.

== Primary election ==
=== Republican party ===
==== Candidates ====
- Andrew H. Dahl, former State Treasurer of Wisconsin
- William H. Hatton, former State Senator
- Merlin Hull, Speaker of the Wisconsin State Assembly
- Emanuel L. Philipp, Milwaukee Police Commissioner
- Henry E. Roethe, member of the Wisconsin State Assembly
- Bernice W. Utman

==== Results ====
Republican primary results
Party	Candidate	Votes	%
Republican	Emanuel L. Philipp	43,733	35.09%
Republican	Andrew H. Dahl	27,619	22.16%
Republican	William H. Hatton	23,275	18.68%
Republican	Henry E. Roethe	12,411	9.96%
Republican	Merlin Hull	10,841	8.70%
Republican	Bernice W. Utman	6,735	5.40%
Republican	Scattering	3 (Note: The Blue Book says 2 but to match the total for all candidates it needs to be 3)	0.00%
Total votes		124,617	100.00%

=== Democratic party ===
==== Candidates ====
- John A. Aylward, Democratic nominee for Governor in 1906 and 1908
- John C. Karel, Milwaukee County Court judge, Democratic nominee for Governor in 1912

==== Results ====
Democratic primary results
Party	Candidate	Votes	%
Democratic	John C. Karel	38,995	53.45%
Democratic	John A. Aylward	33,937	46.52%
Democratic	Scattering	20	0.03%
Total votes		72,952	100.00%

=== Social Democratic party ===
==== Candidates ====
- Oscar Ameringer, newspaper editor

==== Results ====
Social Democratic primary results
Party	Candidate	Votes	%
Social Democratic	Oscar Ameringer	12,678	99.98%
Social Democratic	Scattering	2	0.02%
Total votes		12,680	100.00%

=== Prohibition party ===
==== Candidates ====
- David W. Emerson, Prohibition nominee for Wisconsin's 11th congressional district in 1912

==== Results ====
Prohibition primary results
Party	Candidate	Votes	%
Prohibition	David W. Emerson	1,936%	99.90
Prohibition	Scattering	2	0.10%
Total votes		1,938	100.00%

=== Other party nominations ===
- John J. Blaine, Progressive
- John Vierthaler, Socialist Labor, Socialist Labor nominee for Lieutenant Governor in 1912

== General election ==
=== Results ===
1914 Wisconsin gubernatorial election (Note: One must exercise caution using the Blue Book as a source for Wisconsin election data for the period of 1890-1920 as it was unreliable during this period. In this case, the Blue Book's totals for all candidates are incorrect and it also contains numerous mistakes in the county figures.)
Party	Candidate	Votes	%	±%
Republican	Emanuel L. Philipp	140,787	43.26%	−2.28%
Democratic	John C. Karel	119,509	36.72%	−5.76%
Progressive	John J. Blaine	32,560	10.01%	
Social Democratic	Oscar Ameringer	25,917	7.96%	−0.79%
Prohibition	David W. Emerson	6,279	1.93%	−0.47%
Socialist Labor	John Vierthaler	352	0.11%	−0.72%
	Scattering	26	0.01%	
Majority		21,278	6.54%	
Total votes		325,430	100.00%	
Republican hold		Swing	+3.48%	

=== Results by county ===
Karel was the first Democrat to ever win Pepin County and Vilas County. He was also the first Democrat since George W. Peck in 1892 to win Brown County and Chippewa County. After this election, Chippewa County and Fond du Lac County would not vote Democratic again until 1932 and Vilas County would not do the same until 1934.

This was the first time Vilas County ever voted for the losing candidate. Brown County and Chippewa County voted for the losing candidate for the first time since 1888 and 1886, respectively.

County	Emanuel L. Philipp Republican		John C. Karel Democratic		John J. Blaine Progressive		Oscar Ameringer Social-Democratic		David W. Emerson Prohibition		John Vierthaler Socialist Labor		Margin		Total votes cast
County	#	%	#	%	#	%	#	%	#	%	#	%	#	%	Total votes cast
Adams	451	48.13%	219	23.37%	206	21.99%	32	3.42%	24	2.56%	5	0.53%	232	24.76%	937
Ashland	1,384	45.33%	1,123	36.78%	215	7.04%	182	5.96%	144	4.72%	5	0.16%	261	8.55%	3,053
Barron	1,170	44.17%	830	31.33%	324	12.23%	97	3.66%	225	8.49%	3	0.11%	340	12.84%	2,649
Bayfield	863	51.13%	325	19.25%	266	15.76%	165	9.77%	63	3.73%	6	0.36%	538	31.87%	1,688
Brown	2,738	39.04%	3,691	52.63%	153	2.18%	342	4.88%	89	1.27%	0	0.00%	-953	-13.59%	7,013
Buffalo	865	50.12%	490	28.39%	293	16.98%	34	1.97%	43	2.49%	1	0.06%	375	21.73%	1,726
Burnett	743	55.24%	228	16.95%	182	13.53%	103	7.66%	81	6.02%	5	0.37%	515	38.29%	1,345 (Note: Includes 3 Scattering votes)
Calumet	1,027	38.38%	1,526	57.03%	63	2.35%	38	1.42%	20	0.75%	0	0.00%	-499	-18.65%	2,676 (Note: Includes 2 Scattering votes)
Chippewa	1,881	44.81%	1,990	47.40%	235	5.60%	43	1.02%	47	1.12%	0	0.00%	-109	-2.60%	4,198
Clark	1,787	53.01%	1,080	32.04%	341	10.12%	83	2.46%	78	2.31%	2	0.06%	707	20.97%	3,371
Columbia	2,361	49.33%	1,491	31.15%	797	16.65%	48	1.00%	88	1.84%	1	0.02%	870	18.18%	4,786
Crawford	1,110	37.59%	1,303	44.12%	466	15.78%	25	0.85%	43	1.46%	5	0.17%	-193	-6.54%	2,953 (Note: Includes 1 Scattering vote)
Dane	3,537	26.75%	5,178	39.17%	4,131	31.25%	144	1.09%	217	1.64%	11	0.08%	-1,047 (Note: Karel's margin over Blaine)	-7.92%	13,220
Dodge	3,044	39.85%	4,104	53.73%	331	4.33%	57	0.75%	101	1.32%	1	0.01%	-1,060	-13.88%	7,638
Door	1,271	58.92%	726	33.66%	88	4.08%	24	1.11%	48	2.23%	0	0.00%	545	25.27%	2,157
Douglas	2,474	43.13%	2,240	39.05%	332	5.79%	563	9.82%	120	2.09%	7	0.12%	234	4.08%	5,736
Dunn	1,044	51.38%	389	19.14%	414	20.37%	134	6.59%	50	2.46%	1	0.05%	630 (Note: Philipp's margin over Blaine)	31.01%	2,032
Eau Claire	1,602	42.19%	1,291	34.00%	663	17.46%	138	3.63%	93	2.45%	8	0.21%	311	8.19%	3,797
Florence	347	71.40%	70	14.40%	43	8.85%	13	2.67%	8	1.65%	5	1.03%	277	57.00%	486
Fond du Lac	3,208	38.98%	4,061	49.34%	676	8.21%	130	1.58%	149	1.81%	6	0.07%	-853	-10.36%	8,230
Forest	689	66.06%	237	22.72%	69	6.62%	25	2.40%	23	2.21%	0	0.00%	452	43.34%	1,043
Grant	2,470	46.34%	1,753	32.89%	911	17.09%	42	0.79%	150	2.81%	4	0.08%	717	13.45%	5,330
Green	1,511	47.46%	861	27.04%	604	18.97%	76	2.39%	130	4.08%	2	0.06%	650	20.41%	3,184
Green Lake	1,155	50.68%	903	39.62%	147	6.45%	31	1.36%	40	1.76%	3	0.13%	252	11.06%	2,279
Iowa	1,621	45.88%	1,227	34.73%	519	14.69%	9	0.25%	155	4.39%	2	0.06%	394	11.15%	3,533
Iron	672	71.04%	177	18.71%	25	2.64%	41	4.33%	28	2.96%	3	0.32%	495	52.33%	946
Jackson	1,117	56.05%	569	28.55%	221	11.09%	37	1.86%	48	2.41%	1	0.05%	548	27.50%	1,993
Jefferson	2,385	42.12%	2,728	48.18%	383	6.76%	76	1.34%	83	1.47%	0	0.00%	-343	-6.06%	5,662 (Note: Includes 7 Scattering votes)
Juneau	1,549	53.84%	901	31.32%	347	12.06%	35	1.22%	39	1.36%	6	0.21%	648	22.52%	2,877
Kenosha	2,460	45.71%	2,351	43.68%	208	3.86%	296	5.50%	64	1.19%	3	0.06%	109	2.03%	5,382
Kewaunee	833	29.47%	1,865	65.97%	93	3.29%	12	0.42%	20	0.71%	4	0.14%	-1,032	-36.51%	2,827
La Crosse	2,454	40.81%	2,112	35.12%	1,231	20.47%	127	2.11%	68	1.13%	21	0.35%	342	5.69%	6,013
Lafayette	1,602	46.13%	1,339	38.55%	431	12.41%	15	0.43%	84	2.42%	2	0.06%	263	7.57%	3,473
Langlade	1,189	42.54%	1,329	47.55%	174	6.23%	54	1.93%	46	1.65%	3	0.11%	-140	-5.01%	2,795
Lincoln	1,528	53.22%	983	34.24%	196	6.83%	123	4.28%	39	1.36%	0	0.00%	545	18.98%	2,871
Manitowoc	2,604	36.80%	3,779	53.40%	90	1.27%	556	7.86%	47	0.66%	1	0.01%	-1,175	-16.60%	7,077
Marathon	3,642	46.06%	3,377	42.71%	375	4.74%	405	5.12%	99	1.25%	9	0.11%	265	3.35%	7,907
Marinette	2,250	56.73%	1,211	30.53%	179	4.51%	156	3.93%	163	4.11%	7	0.18%	1,039	26.20%	3,966
Marquette	1,001	55.43%	601	33.28%	159	8.80%	8	0.44%	37	2.05%	0	0.00%	400	22.15%	1,806
Milwaukee	22,267	35.28%	19,852	31.46%	2,970	4.71%	17,588	27.87%	329	0.52%	101	0.16%	2,415	3.83%	63,107
Monroe	1,638	49.92%	995	30.33%	489	14.90%	50	1.52%	101	3.08%	8	0.24%	643	19.60%	3,281
Oconto	1,752	52.13%	1,350	40.17%	140	4.17%	79	2.35%	40	1.19%	0	0.00%	402	11.96%	3,361
Oneida	923	50.99%	547	30.22%	202	11.16%	106	5.86%	29	1.60%	3	0.17%	376	20.77%	1,810
Outagamie	3,317	44.54%	3,233	43.41%	680	9.13%	105	1.41%	112	1.50%	0	0.00%	84	1.13%	7,447
Ozaukee	751	30.58%	1,585	64.54%	62	2.52%	44	1.79%	14	0.57%	0	0.00%	-834	-33.96%	2,456
Pepin	398	41.54%	429	44.78%	76	7.93%	29	3.03%	26	2.71%	0	0.00%	-31	-3.24%	958
Pierce	841	51.47%	332	20.32%	338	20.69%	43	2.63%	74	4.53%	4	0.24%	503	30.78%	1,634
Polk	798	50.06%	295	18.51%	308	19.32%	115	7.21%	70	4.39%	8	0.50%	490	30.74%	1,594
Portage	1,736	41.39%	1,933	46.09%	423	10.09%	41	0.98%	59	1.41%	2	0.05%	-197	-4.70%	4,194
Price	896	53.05%	419	24.81%	116	6.87%	207	12.26%	48	2.84%	3	0.18%	477	28.24%	1,689
Racine	2,862	42.44%	2,731	40.50%	558	8.28%	395	5.86%	187	2.77%	10	0.15%	131	1.94%	6,743
Richland	1,040	36.91%	649	23.03%	853	30.27%	45	1.60%	230	8.16%	1	0.04%	187	6.64%	2,818
Rock	3,856	49.91%	2,186	28.29%	1,236	16.00%	227	2.94%	215	2.78%	6	0.08%	1,670	21.62%	7,726
Rusk	737	53.29%	320	23.14%	206	14.90%	76	5.50%	41	2.96%	3	0.22%	417	30.15%	1,383
Sauk	2,063	52.21%	1,073	27.16%	577	14.60%	30	0.76%	200	5.06%	8	0.20%	990	25.06%	3,951
Sawyer	460	55.09%	281	33.65%	56	6.71%	19	2.28%	19	2.28%	0	0.00%	179	21.44%	835
Shawano	1,810	54.65%	876	26.45%	467	14.10%	80	2.42%	75	2.26%	4	0.12%	934	28.20%	3,312
Sheboygan	4,029	45.49%	3,451	38.96%	523	5.90%	786	8.87%	58	0.65%	10	0.11%	578	6.53%	8,857
St. Croix	1,679	46.01%	1,464	40.12%	285	7.81%	111	3.04%	103	2.82%	7	0.19%	215	5.89%	3,649
Taylor	845	44.15%	732	38.24%	176	9.20%	127	6.64%	33	1.72%	1	0.05%	113	5.90%	1,914
Trempealeau	1,034	40.85%	825	32.60%	567	22.40%	16	0.63%	87	3.44%	2	0.08%	209	8.26%	2,531
Vernon	1,429	52.02%	554	20.17%	621	22.61%	26	0.95%	116	4.22%	1	0.04%	808	29.41%	2,747
Vilas	254	38.54%	262	39.76%	40	6.07%	84	12.75%	16	2.43%	3	0.46%	-8	-1.21%	659
Walworth	2,011	50.80%	1,284	32.43%	377	9.52%	48	1.21%	235	5.94%	4	0.10%	727	18.36%	3,959
Washburn	793	63.59%	297	23.82%	64	5.13%	51	4.09%	40	3.21%	2	0.16%	496	39.78%	1,247
Washington	2,007	47.13%	2,060	48.38%	93	2.18%	76	1.78%	22	0.52%	0	0.00%	-53	-1.24%	4,258
Waukesha	2,964	46.13%	2,421	37.68%	737	11.47%	128	1.99%	174	2.71%	2	0.03%	543	8.45%	6,426
Waupaca	2,703	59.72%	898	19.84%	651	14.38%	129	2.85%	139	3.07%	6	0.13%	1,805	39.88%	4,526
Waushara	1,117	60.74%	227	12.34%	390	21.21%	53	2.88%	50	2.72%	2	0.11%	727	39.53%	1,839
Winnebago	4,205	44.85%	3,407	36.34%	1,334	14.23%	291	3.10%	131	1.40%	4	0.04%	798	8.51%	9,375
Wood	1,933	43.06%	1,883	41.95%	364	8.11%	193	4.30%	112	2.49%	4	0.09%	50	1.11%	4,489
Total	140,787	43.26%	119,509	36.72%	32,560	10.01%	25,917	7.96%	6,279	1.93%	352	0.11%	21,278	6.54%	325,430

==== Counties that flipped from Democratic to Republican ====
- Forest
- Green Lake
- Kenosha
- Marathon
- Milwaukee
- Racine
- Sheboygan
- Waukesha

==== Counties that flipped from Republican to Democratic ====
- Brown
- Chippewa
- Dane
- Pepin
- Vilas

== Bibliography ==
- Glashan, Roy R. (1979). American Governors and Gubernatorial Elections, 1775-1978. Meckler Books. ISBN 0-930466-17-9.
- Gubernatorial Elections, 1787-1997. Washington, D.C.: Congressional Quarterly Inc. 1998. ISBN 1-56802-396-0.
- The Wisconsin Blue Book, 1915. Madison, Wisconsin: Democrat Printing Co., State Printer. 1915.
