= 1910 Wisconsin lieutenant gubernatorial election =

- November 8, 1910
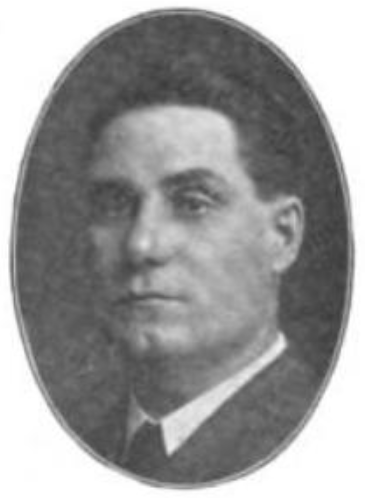

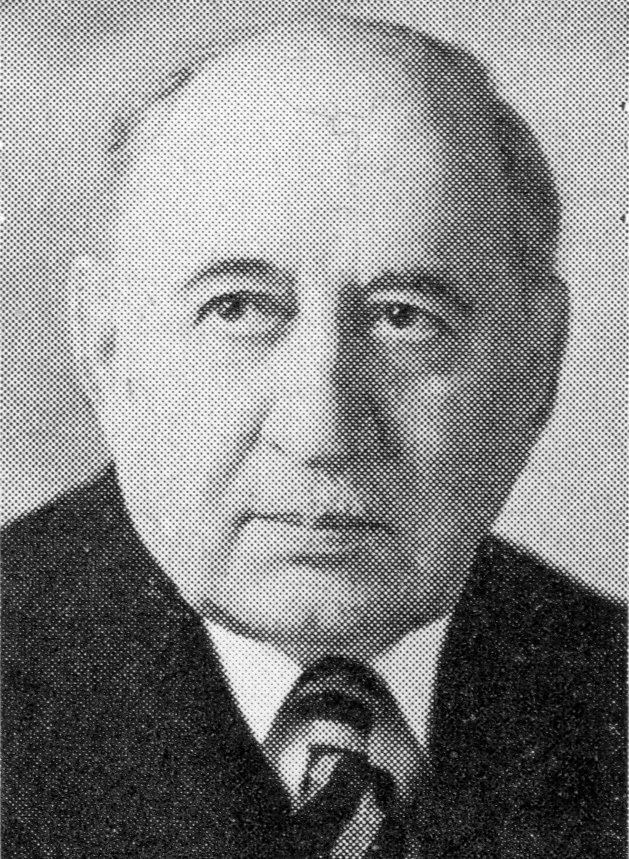

Nominee	Thomas Morris	Harry W. Bolens	Henry Bruins
Party	Republican	Democratic	Social Democratic
Popular vote	159,719	106,388	39,828
Percentage	50.92%	33.92%	12.70%
Lieutenant Governor before election
John Strange
Republican
Elected Lieutenant Governor
Thomas Morris
Republican

The 1910 Wisconsin lieutenant gubernatorial election was held on November 8, 1910, in order to elect the lieutenant governor of Wisconsin. Republican nominee and incumbent member of the Wisconsin Senate Thomas Morris defeated Democratic nominee and incumbent Mayor of Port Washington Harry W. Bolens, Social Democratic nominee Henry Bruins and Prohibition nominee Charles L. Hill.

== Republican primary ==
The Republican primary election was held on September 6, 1910. Incumbent member of the Wisconsin Senate Thomas Morris received a majority of the votes (58.78%) against fellow incumbent state senator George Hudnall, and was thus elected as the nominee for the general election.

=== Results ===
1910 Republican lieutenant gubernatorial primary
Party	Candidate	Votes	%
Republican	Thomas Morris	97,664	58.78%
Republican	George Hudnall	68,525	41.22%
Total votes		166,139	100.00%

== General election ==
On election day, November 8, 1910, Republican nominee Thomas Morris won the election by a margin of 53,331 votes against his foremost opponent Democratic nominee Harry W. Bolens, thereby retaining Republican control over the office of lieutenant governor. Morris was sworn in as the 22nd lieutenant governor of Wisconsin on January 2, 1911.

=== Results ===
Wisconsin lieutenant gubernatorial election, 1910
Party	Candidate	Votes	%
Republican	Thomas Morris	159,719	50.92
Democratic	Harry W. Bolens	106,388	33.92
Social Democratic	Henry Bruins	39,828	12.70
Prohibition	Charles L. Hill	7,273	2.32
	Scattering	461	0.14
Total votes		313,669	100.00
Republican hold			
