= John C. Karel =

American politician

The Honorable John C. Karel
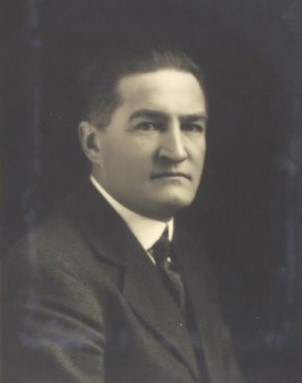

Member of the Wisconsin State Assembly from the Milwaukee 9th district
- In office January 1, 1901 – January 1, 1903
- Preceded by: George H. Schoenbaum
- Succeeded by: Jacob Kehrein

Personal details
- Born: February 28, 1873 Schuyler, Nebraska, U.S.
- Died: December 3, 1938 (aged 65) Milwaukee, Wisconsin, U.S.
- Parent: John Carel (father)
- Education: University of Wisconsin Law School
- Coaching career

Playing career

Football
- 1892: Wisconsin
- 1894–1896: Wisconsin
- 1898: Wisconsin

Baseball
- c. 1895: Wisconsin

Coaching career (HC unless noted)

Football
- 1896: Lawrence

Head coaching record
- Overall: 3–2–1

John Colonel "Ikey" Karel Jr.,(February 28, 1873 – December 3, 1938) was an American politician, judge, lawyer, college football player, and coach.

== Early life and athletic career ==
Karel was born on February 28, 1873, in Schuyler, Nebraska. He moved with his family to Wisconsin in 1874 and attended high school in Kewaunee, Wisconsin, before graduating from the University of Wisconsin Law School in 1895 and moving to Milwaukee. While at University of Wisconsin, Karel was a football player and a baseball player for the Wisconsin Badgers. Karel also coached the football team at Lawrence College in Appleton, Wisconsin, in 1896.

== Political career ==
Karel was a member of the Wisconsin State Assembly in 1901 and was a Democrat. Additionally, he was twice an unsuccessful candidate for Governor of Wisconsin, losing to incumbent Francis E. McGovern in 1912 and to Emanuel L. Philipp in 1914. In 1916, he was a delegate to the Democratic National Convention. From 1907 until his death in 1938, Karel served as Milwaukee County Court judge. Karel died in Milwaukee, Wisconsin.

== Head coaching record ==
Year	Team	Overall	Conference	Standing	Bowl/playoffs
Lawrence Vikings (Independent) (1896)
1896	Lawrence	3–2–1			
Lawrence:		3–2–1			
Total:		3–2–1			

Party political offices
Preceded by Adolph H. Schmitz	Democratic nominee for Governor of Wisconsin; 1912, 1914	Succeeded by Burt Williams
