= 1914 United States Senate election in Wisconsin =

- November 6, 1914
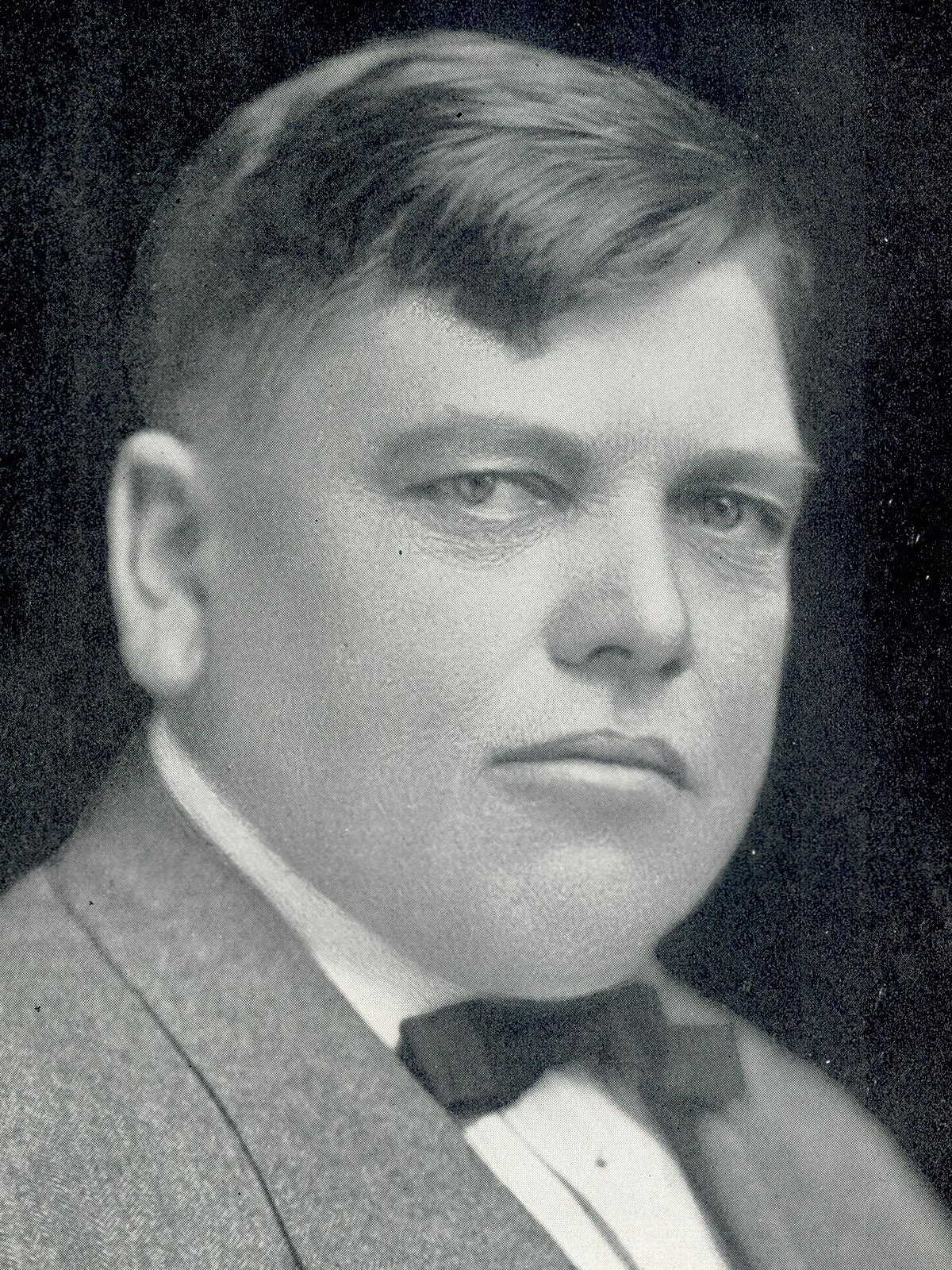

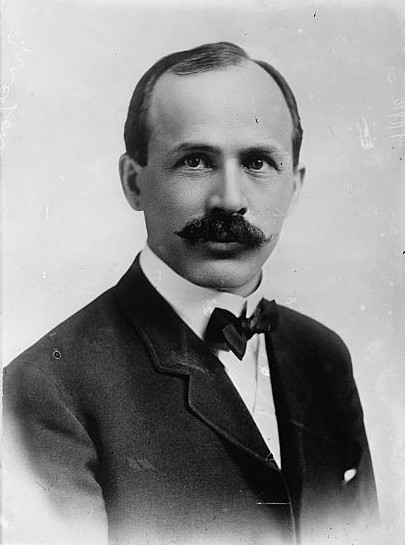

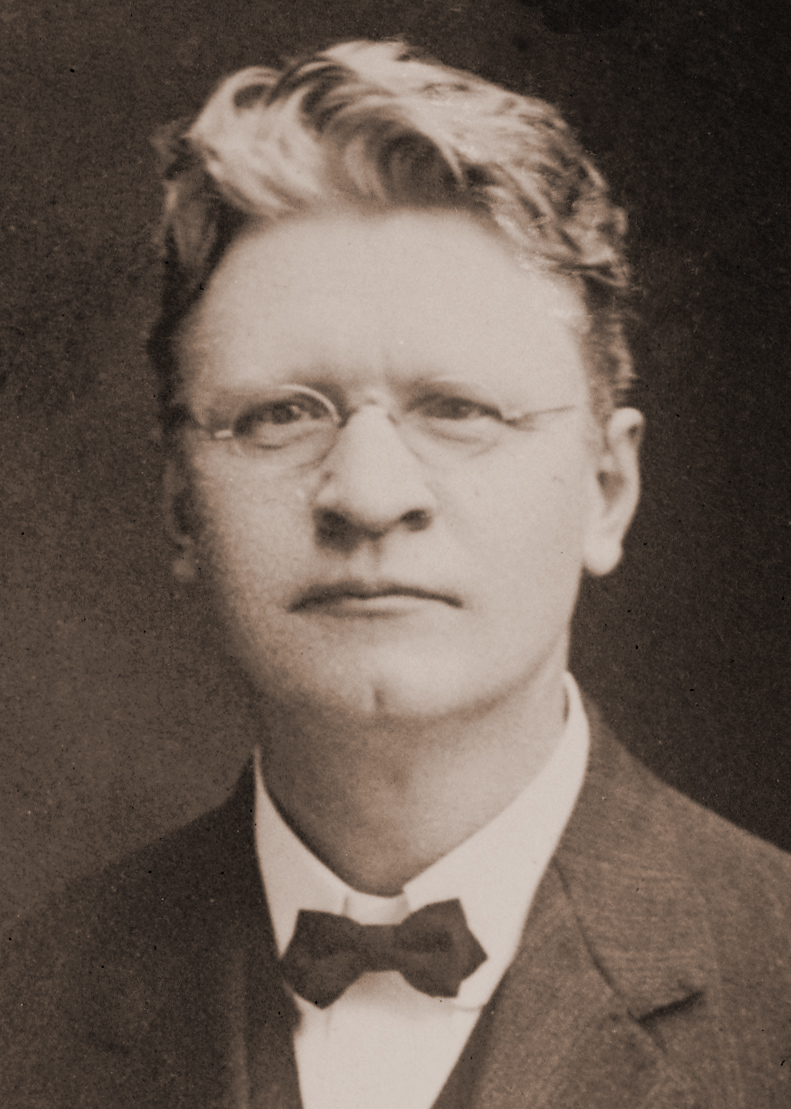
| Nominee | Paul O. Husting | Francis E. McGovern | Emil Seidel |
| Party | Democratic | Republican | Social-Democratic |
| First round | 134,925; 43.80% | 133,966; 43.49% | 29,774; 9.68% |
| Final round | 135,306; 50.18% | 134,339; 49.82% | Eliminated |
- County results Husting: 30–40% 40–50% 50–60% 60–70% 70–80% McGovern: 40–50% 50–60% 60–70% 70–80%
U.S. senator before election
Isaac Stephenson
Republican
Elected U.S. Senator
Paul O. Husting
Democratic

The 1914 United States Senate election in Wisconsin was held on November 6, 1914. Incumbent Republican Senator Isaac Stephenson did not run for re-election.

Democratic State Senator Paul O. Husting narrowly defeated Republican Governor Francis E. McGovern. Social-Democratic former mayor of Milwaukee Emil Seidel ran a strong third. This was the first United States Senate election to be held by a popular vote in Wisconsin. Uniquely for this contest, Wisconsin utilized an early form of instant-runoff voting; all other elections in the state in 1914 were conducted using traditional first-past-the-post voting and Wisconsin would discontinue using this method following this election.

As of 2026, this is the last open seat election for this seat in which an incumbent senator retired. Following Husting's death, all subsequent incumbents would be defeated for reelection, either in the primary or general elections.

== Primary election ==
=== Republican party ===
==== Candidates ====
- Levi H. Bancroft, former Attorney General of Wisconsin
- Timothy Burke, member of Wisconsin Senate
- Charles E. Estabrook, member of Wisconsin State Assembly
- Francis E. McGovern, incumbent governor
- Thomas Morris, incumbent lieutenant governor
- John Strange, former lieutenant governor

==== Results ====
Republican primary results
| Party | Candidate | Votes | % |
|---|---|---|---|
| Republican | Francis E. McGovern | 37,125 | 32.23% |
| Republican | Levi H. Bancroft | 26,156 | 22.71% |
| Republican | Thomas Morris | 26,012 | 22.58% |
| Republican | John Strange | 11,983 | 10.40% |
| Republican | Charles E. Estabrook | 7,179 | 6.23% |
| Republican | Timothy Burke | 6,721 | 5.84% |
| Republican | Scattering | 2 | 0.00% |
| Total votes | | 115,178 | 100.00% |

=== Democratic party ===
==== Candidates ====
- Paul O. Husting, state senator from Dodge County
- Thomas Kearney

==== Results ====
Democratic primary results
| Party | Candidate | Votes | % |
|---|---|---|---|
| Democratic | Paul O. Husting | 35,963 | 54.93% |
| Democratic | Thomas Kearney | 29,459 | 45.00% |
| Democratic | Scattering | 47 | 0.07% |
| Total votes | | 65,469 | 100.00% |

=== Social-Democratic Party ===
==== Candidates ====
- Emil Seidel, former mayor of Milwaukee

==== Results ====
Social-Democratic primary results
| Party | Candidate | Votes | % |
|---|---|---|---|
| Social-Democratic | Emil Seidel | 12,417 | 100.00% |
| Total votes | | 12,417 | 100.00% |

=== Prohibition party ===
==== Candidates ====
- Charles L. Hill, nominee for Governor of Wisconsin in 1912

==== Results ====
Prohibition primary results
| Party | Candidate | Votes | % |
|---|---|---|---|
| Prohibition | Charles L. Hill | 1,754 | 99.66% |
| Prohibition | Scattering | 6 | 0.34% |
| Total votes | | 1.760 | 100.00% |

== General election ==
=== Candidates ===
- Paul O. Husting, Democratic
- Francis E. McGovern, Republican
- Emil Seidel, Social-Democratic
- Charles L. Hill, Prohibition

=== Results ===
Wisconsin's general election for United States Senate in 1914 utilized an early form of instant-runoff voting and it was only used for this particular election. Voters were able to make a first and second choice among the four candidates. Since no candidate received an absolute majority of the first choice votes, candidates were progressively eliminated and their second choice votes added to the remaining candidates. However, very few voters actually availed themselves of the second choice option. The final tally only netted each major party candidate about 400 votes each. Hustings' leads in the first choice votes only and after the final elimination were essentially the same, but once Seidel was eliminated, that lead was sufficient for a small majority.

1914 United States Senate election in Wisconsin
| Party | Candidate | First choice | | | Round 1 | | | Round 2 | | | Round 3 | |
| Party | Candidate | Votes | % | Transfer | Votes | % | Transfer | Votes | % | Transfer | Votes | % |
|---|---|---|---|---|---|---|---|---|---|---|---|---|
| Democratic | Paul O. Husting | 134,925 | 43.80% | +0 | 134,925 | 43.82% | +188 | 135,113 | 45.18% | +193 | 135,306 | 50.18% |
| Republican | Francis E. McGovern | 133,966 | 43.49% | +0 | 133,966 | 43.50% | +158 | 134,124 | 44.85% | +215 | 134,339 | 49.82% |
| Social-Democratic | Emil Seidel | 29,774 | 9.67% | +0 | 29,774 | 9.67% | +30 | 29,804 | 9.97% | −29,804 | Eliminated | |
| Prohibition | Charles L. Hill | 9,276 | 3.01% | +0 | 9,276 | 3.01% | −9,276 | Eliminated | | | | |
| Scattering | | 78 | 0.03% | -78 | Eliminated | | | | | | | |
| Total votes | | 308,019 | | | 307,941 | | | 299,041 | | | 269,645 | |
| Blank or inactive ballots | | | | | 78 | | +8,900 | 8,978 | | +29,396 | 38,374 | |
| Democratic gain from Republican | | | | | | | | | | | | |

== See also ==
- 1914 United States Senate elections
