= Carl D. Thompson =

American politician

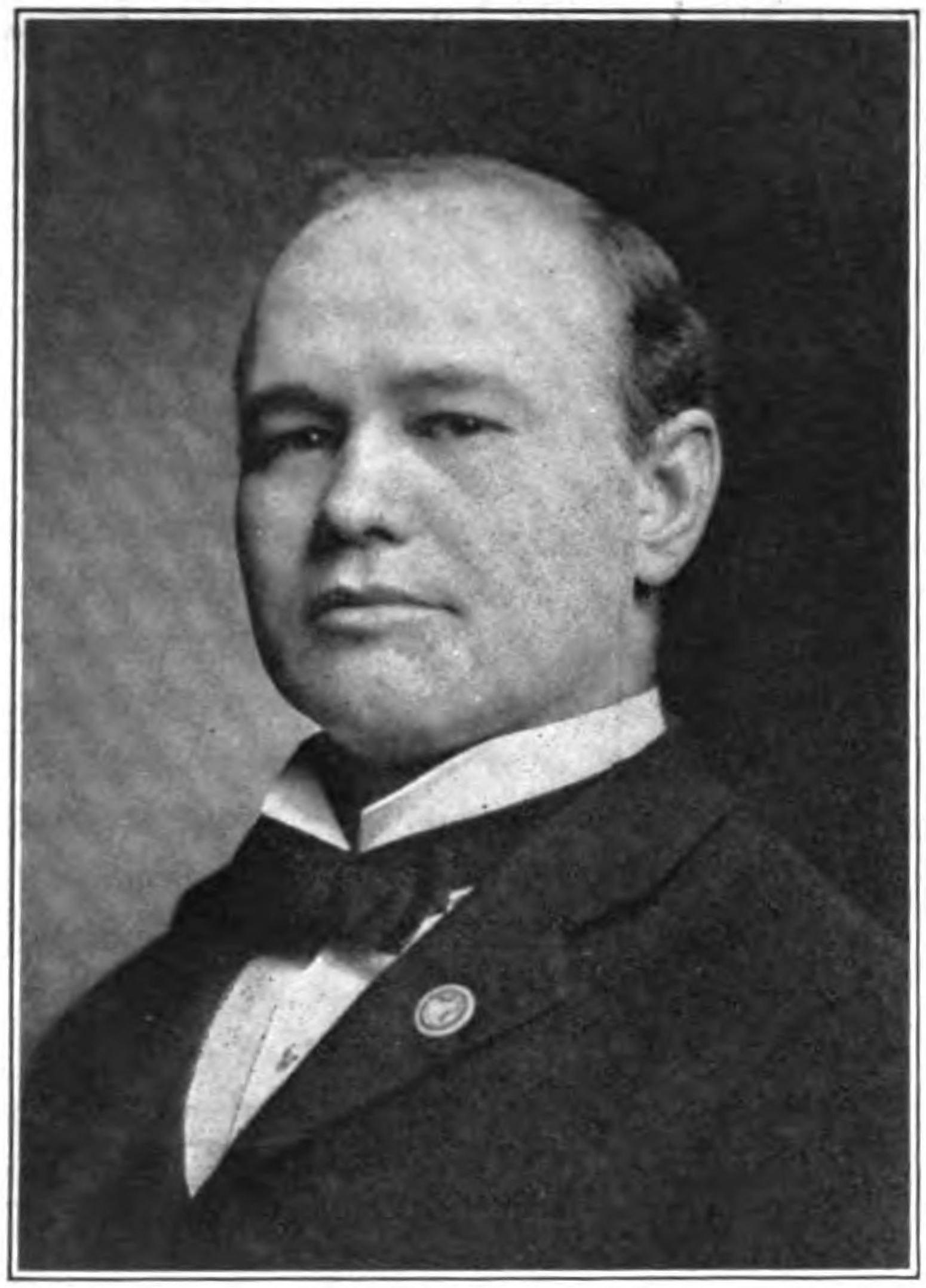
- Thompson c. 1908

Member of the Wisconsin State Assembly from the Milwaukee 12th district
- In office January 7, 1907 – January 4, 1909
- Preceded by: August Dietrich
- Succeeded by: Carl Busacker

Personal details
- Born: Carl Dean Thompson; March 24, 1870 Berlin, Michigan, U.S.
- Died: July 3, 1949 (aged 79) Lincoln, Nebraska, U.S.
- Party: Socialist
- Education: Chicago Theological Seminary; University of Chicago

Carl D. Thompson (March 24, 1870 – July 3, 1949) was an American preacher, Christian Socialist, and Social Democratic politician. A Congregationalist minister early in his life, Thompson is best remembered as a lecturer and political organizer for the Socialist Party of America.

Thompson left the Socialist Party owing to its opposition to World War I and thereafter participated in other liberal political organizations, including the Committee of 48 and his own group, the National Public Ownership League.

== Biography ==
=== Early years ===
Carl D. Thompson was born on March 24, 1870, in Berlin, Michigan, a small town on the shore of Lake Erie in the southeastern corner of the state. He graduated from Gates College in Nebraska in 1895, from the Chicago Theological Seminary in 1898; and earned an MA degree from Chicago University in 1900. From 1891 through 1900, Thompson was employed as a minister of various Congregationalist churches. In 1900 he was minister of the Prospect Street Congregational Church in Elgin, Illinois, and in regular contact with Christian Socialist J. Stitt Wilson. On January 1, 1901, he resigned from the pastorate of the Prospect Street Church and established a new Church of the Social Conscience.

=== Political career ===
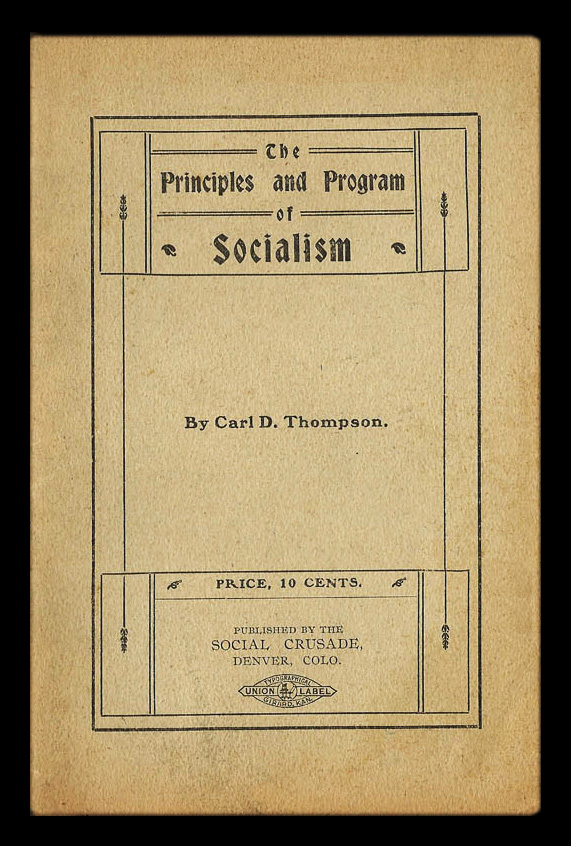
Cover of Thompson's first pamphlet, published in 1900.

In September 1901 Thompson moved west to join J. Stitt Wilson's new "Social Crusade", a group of five ministers and former ministers who evangelized for socialism throughout California, Oregon, Washington and Colorado.

The socially-aware Thompson was a convert to Christian Socialism and a devotee of Victor L. Berger's Social Democratic Party of America. He worked as a State Organizer for the SDP of Wisconsin from 1898 until the merger of that organization at the 1901 Unity Convention which established the Socialist Party of America.

Thompson was elected, to the Wisconsin State Assembly, as a Social Democrat (Socialist) in 1906 for the 12th Milwaukee County district, with 1,648 votes against 1,545 for the incumbent, Republican August Dietrich and 1010 for Democratic nominees Adam Muth. He was assigned to the standing committees on transportation and on third readings. In 1908, he was unseated in turn by Republican Carl Busacker, with 2,047 votes for Busacker, 1,956 for Thompson, 1,839 for Democrat George Schaefer, and 100 for Prohibitionist Benjamin C. Hughes. During the 1908 United States presidential election he was nominated by Victor L. Berger for the Socialist presidential nomination, but it was given to Eugene V. Debs again.

Thompson was a member of the Socialist Party's National Committee, representing Wisconsin. On June 19, 1912, Thompson was given the nomination of the Social Democratic Party, the Wisconsin state Socialist Party retained its historic name, for Governor of Wisconsin, coming in third in a five-way race with 8.74% of the vote, far more than the 3.05% margin of victory of Republican victor Francis E. McGovern.

In 1914, Thompson moved to Illinois to work for the Socialist Party National Office as head of its Information Department, a post which he retained until the abolition of the position by the National Committee in 1915. Thompson also ran as the SPA's candidate for US Congress from Illinois's 7th congressional district against incumbent Democrat Frank Buchanan in 1914. Buchanan won with only 39.3% of the vote, to 35.4% for Republican Niels Juul (who would unseat Buchanan in 1916), 13.5% for Thompson, and 11.8% for Bull Moose Progressive Charles S. Stewart. Upon termination of the SPA's Information Department, he remained in Illinois and went to work as head of the party's National Lecture Bureau.

In 1916, Thompson ran a tightly fought campaign against former United Mine Workers Union official Adolph Germer for the position of National Executive Secretary of the Socialist Party. Germer was regarded as the more radical of the two candidates and the result was close, with bloc voting by the various branches of the party's foreign language federations largely credited for providing the German-born Germer's margin of victory. During the 1916 United States elections he was the campaign managers of the Socialist Party's national campaign.

=== World War I and after ===
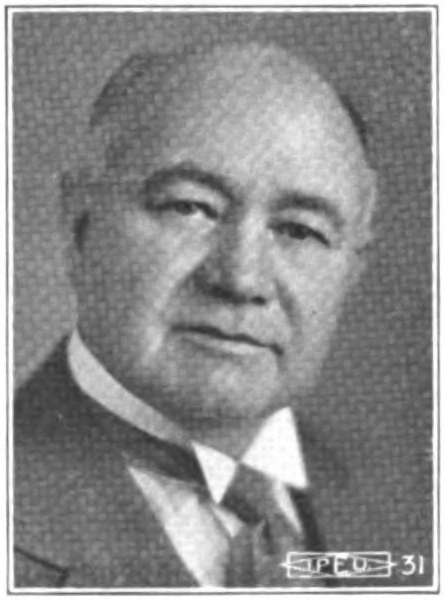
Thompson c. 1930

After American entry into World War I in the spring of 1917, Thompson lent his support to Wilson's war effort. Along with other pro-war Socialists like John Spargo, Allan L. Benson, and William Ghent, Thompson worked throughout 1918 to attempt to cause the Socialist Party to annul what he described as the "illegal and impossible phraseology" of the party's 1917 St. Louis platform. Instead, Thompson urged that the party restate its position on the war, giving full support to Woodrow Wilson's purported "war to save the world for democracy" and explicitly recognizing that only force of arms was a sufficient means to defeat German militarism. Although Thompson indicated his belief that an "overwhelming majority" of the SPA's rank and file supported such a change, the Illinois state convention held May 3–4, 1918, seems to have demonstrated otherwise, with the defiantly antimilitarist St. Louis platform being upheld by "something like two to one" after "vigorous debate" — in Thompson's own estimation. As this political situation became clear in the summer of 1918, Thompson and his co-thinkers on the Socialist Party's right wing admitted defeat and left the ranks of the organization.

After leaving the SPA, Thompson became involved in the activities of the liberal organization known as the Committee of 48, signing the call for the founding conference to organize the group. After that organization faded away in 1920 Thompson went on to establish an organization of his own, the National Public Ownership League, for which he served as National Secretary. This rather obscure organization seems to have continued at least through the middle-1930s.

=== Death and legacy ===
Shortly after moving to Lincoln, Nebraska Thompson died on July 3, 1949, at age 79.

== Works ==
- The Principles and Program of Socialism. (Denver, CO: The Social Crusade, 1900).
- The Constructive Program of Socialism. (1908)
- Christian Elements in the Socialist Movement. (1909)
- The Rising Tide of Socialism. (1911)
- Have the Socialists Made Good? (1913)
- "Fighting for Labor in State Legislatures," The Western Comrade, vol. 1, no. 4 (July 1913), pp. 116–119.
- What Is Socialism? (1914)
- Municipal Ownership (1917)
- Public Ownership of Railways (1919)
- Public Ownership — The Way Out (1933).
