= 1912 Wisconsin lieutenant gubernatorial election =

- November 5, 1912
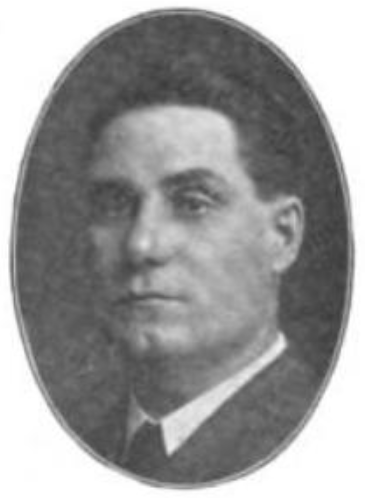

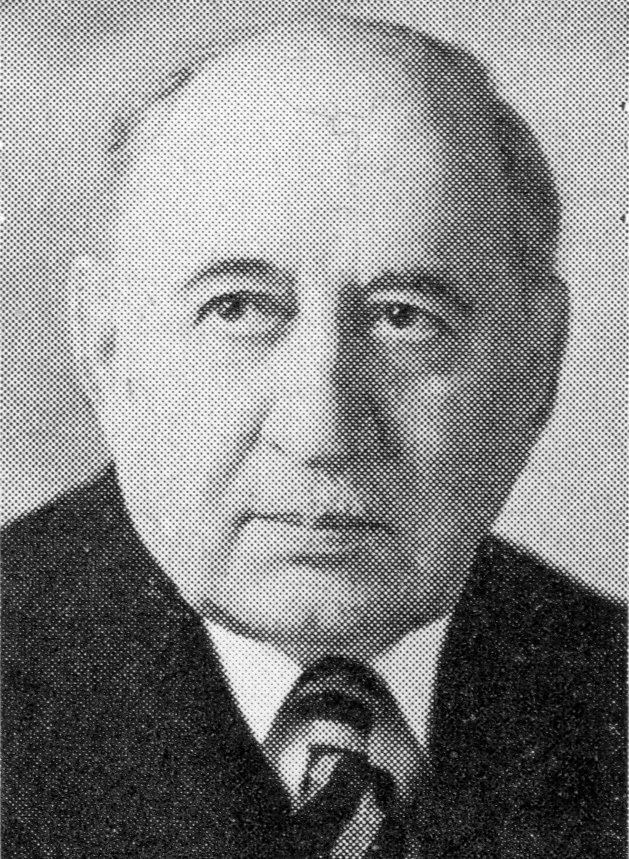

Nominee	Thomas Morris	Harry W. Bolens	Henry M. Parks
Party	Republican	Democratic	Social Democratic
Popular vote	178,694	156,010	35,155
Percentage	46.81%	40.87%	9.21%
Lieutenant Governor before election
Thomas Morris
Republican
Elected Lieutenant Governor
Thomas Morris
Republican

The 1912 Wisconsin lieutenant gubernatorial election was held on November 5, 1912, in order to elect the lieutenant governor of Wisconsin. Incumbent Republican lieutenant governor Thomas Morris defeated Democratic nominee and incumbent Mayor of Port Washington Harry W. Bolens (in a rematch of the previous election), Social Democratic nominee Henry M. Parks, Prohibition nominee Joseph V. Collins and Socialist Labor nominee John Vierthaler.

== Democratic primary ==
The Democratic primary election was held on September 3, 1912. Incumbent Mayor of Port Washington and nominee for lieutenant governor in the previous election Harry W. Bolens received a majority of the votes (66.14%) against former nominee for U.S. House in Wisconsin's 1st district in 1908 Henry A. Moehlenpah, and was thus elected as the nominee for the general election.

=== Results ===
1912 Democratic lieutenant gubernatorial primary
Party	Candidate	Votes	%
Democratic	Harry W. Bolens	49,295	66.14%
Democratic	Henry A. Moehlenpah	25,239	33.86%
Total votes		74,534	100.00%

== General election ==
On election day, November 5, 1912, incumbent Republican lieutenant governor Thomas Morris won re-election by a margin of 22,684 votes against his foremost opponent Democratic nominee Harry W. Bolens, thereby retaining Republican control over the office of lieutenant governor. Morris was sworn in for his second term on January 6, 1913.

=== Results ===
Wisconsin lieutenant gubernatorial election, 1912
Party	Candidate	Votes	%
Republican	Thomas Morris (incumbent)	178,694	46.81
Democratic	Harry W. Bolens	156,010	40.87
Social Democratic	Henry M. Parks	35,155	9.21
Prohibition	Joseph V. Collins	8,784	2.30
Socialist Labor	John Vierthaler	3,048	0.80
	Scattering	18	0.01
Total votes		381,709	100.00
Republican hold			
