= Charles W. Henney =

20th century American politician

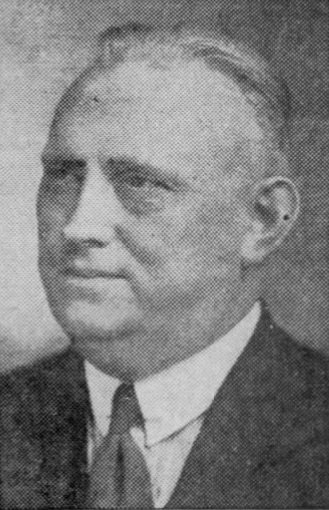
- From the October 16, 1940, edition of the Wisconsin State Journal

Member of the U.S. House of Representatives from Wisconsin's 2nd district
- In office March 4, 1933 – January 3, 1935
- Preceded by: Charles A. Kading
- Succeeded by: Harry Sauthoff

Personal details
- Born: February 2, 1884 Dunlap, Iowa, U.S.
- Died: November 16, 1969 (aged 85) Portage, Wisconsin, U.S.
- Resting place: Saint Marys Cemetery, Portage, Wisconsin
- Party: Democratic
- Spouse: Margaret Elizabeth Tierney (m. 1915–1969)
- Children: John Joseph Henney^{(b. 1920; died 1968)}; Thomas Edward Henney^{(b. 1921; died 1986)}
- Education: Fremont Normal School; Northwestern University Medical School (M.D.)
- Profession: Physician, surgeon

Charles William Francis Henney (February 2, 1884 – November 16, 1969) was an American physician, surgeon, and Democratic politician from Portage, Wisconsin. He was a member of the U.S. House of Representatives for one term, representing Wisconsin's 2nd congressional district during the 73rd Congress (1933–1935). His name was often abbreviated as C. W. Henney.

== Early life and career ==
Charles Henney was born near Dunlap, Iowa, in February 1884. He received his early education there, then attended Denison Normal School. At age 17, he began teaching school in Crawford County, Iowa, then continued his education at the Fremont Normal School, where he graduated from the pharmacy department in 1906. He then attended Northwestern University Medical School and graduated in 1910. He became a practicing physician and surgeon that year, working for two years as an intern at Cook County Hospital in Chicago.

In 1912, Henney moved to Portage, Wisconsin, where he started an independent medical practice and worked as a city health officer. In 1915, he was hired as surgeon for the Chicago, Milwaukee, St. Paul and Pacific Railroad; that same year he was appointed federal pension surgeon for Portage on the recommendation of U.S. representative Michael E. Burke.

After the U.S. entered World War I, Henney was appointed an examining surgeon for the county draft board. Henney kept up a prolific private practice, performed surgeries around the state, and attended medical conferences around the country. He was president of the Columbia County medical association for many years. In 1927 he became chief of surgery at the Divine Savior's Hospital in Portage and that same year he was admitted to the American College of Surgeons. During these years, he was also active with the Knights of Columbus fraternal order, rising to the rank of Grand Knight of the Portage council in 1931.

== Political career ==
Henney was also active in the local Democratic Party organization. He was appointed to the city park commission in 1926 and served for the next 16 years. He made his first run for public office in 1931, when he ran for a seat on the local school board. He lost the election 411 to 205.

Wisconsin's 2nd congressional district 1932–1963

In 1932, he was one of two men from Portage invited to accompany Democratic presidential candidate Franklin D. Roosevelt on a train to Saint Paul, Minnesota. That summer, Henney began a campaign for election to the U.S. House of Representatives in Wisconsin's 2nd congressional district. The district had been significantly reconfigured in the 1932 redistricting. The progressive Republican incumbent, Charles A. Kading, was drawn into an incumbent vs incumbent primary against fellow progressive John M. Nelson, with a stalwart Republican, John B. Gay, also seeking the nomination. With the two progressives splitting the vote, Gay prevailed in the primary, defeating both incumbents. In the Democratic primary, Henney defeated Bert Husting, a former University of Wisconsin football star, former Major League Baseball pitcher, and the brother of former U.S. senator Paul O. Husting.

In the general election, the Wisconsin progressive faction threw their support behind Franklin Roosevelt and other Democratic candidates, in a major schism with the Republican Party. The influential Madison newspaper The Capital Times was at that time an organ of the state's progressive apparatus, and their swing toward the Democrats was a considerable advantage to Henney, whose district contained Madison and Dane County. Henney's advertising leaned into this, identifying himself as a "progressive Democrat" in the newspaper. Henney won 56% of the vote against Gay and two minor party candidates in the Democratic wave election of 1932.

By 1934, however, the progressive faction had formally split from the Republicans and formed their own party, the Wisconsin Progressive Party. At the 1934 election, the progressives carried seven of Wisconsin's 10 congressional districts, including Henney's. Henney came in second place with 33% in his district, behind progressive lawyer Harry Sauthoff, with 42%.

== Later years ==
Henney remained active in Democratic politics through the 1930s and 40s, and was selected as a presidential elector in 1948, casting his vote for Harry Truman. He also remained active in the Knights of Columbus, and served on the national board of directors from 1946 to 1957.

Henney died at a nursing home in Portage on November 16, 1969, after a long illness.

== Personal life and family ==
Charles Henney was one of at least six children born to George Elbridge Henney and his first wife Sarah Jane (née Hanigan).

Charles Henney married Margaret Tierney on October 28, 1915, at St. Mary's Church in Portage. They had two sons.

== Electoral history ==
=== U.S. House (1932, 1934) ===
Year	Election	Date	Elected				Defeated				Total	Plurality
1932	Primary	Sep. 22	C. W. Henney	Democratic			B. J. Husting	Dem.				
1932	General	Nov. 8	C. W. Henney	Democratic	63,091	56.17%	John B. Gay	Rep.	47,193	42.02%	112,319	15,898
1932	General	Nov. 8	C. W. Henney	Democratic	63,091	56.17%	Charles D. Madsen	Soc.	1,686	1.50%	112,319	15,898
1932	General	Nov. 8	C. W. Henney	Democratic	63,091	56.17%	Georgenia J. Koppke	Proh.	349	0.31%	112,319	15,898
1934	General	Nov. 6	Harry Sauthoff	Progressive	41,458	41.76%	C. W. Henney (inc)	Dem.	33,347	33.59%	99,269	8,111
1934	General	Nov. 6	Harry Sauthoff	Progressive	41,458	41.76%	John B. Gay	Rep.	22,995	23.16%	99,269	8,111
1934	General	Nov. 6	Harry Sauthoff	Progressive	41,458	41.76%	Clifford O. Wescott	Soc.	1,469	1.48%	99,269	8,111

U.S. House of Representatives
Preceded by Charles A. Kading	Member of the U.S. House of Representatives from Wisconsin's 2nd congressional district 1933–1935	Succeeded by Harry Sauthoff
