= 1912 Wisconsin gubernatorial election =

- November 5, 1912
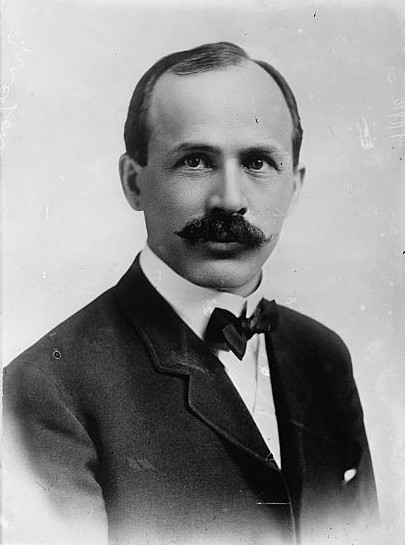

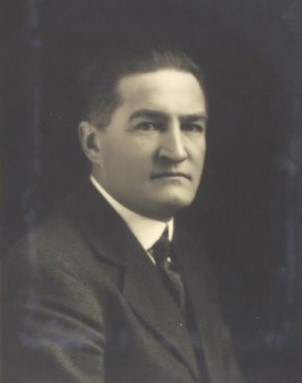

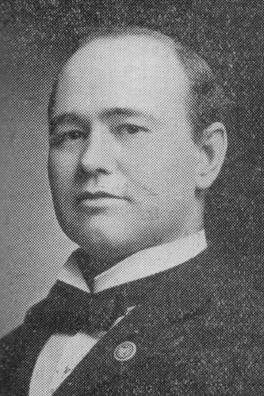
Nominee	Francis E. McGovern	John C. Karel	Carl D. Thompson
Party	Republican	Democratic	Social-Democratic
Popular vote	179,360	167,316	34,468
Percentage	45.54%	42.48%	8.75%
- County results McGovern: 40–50% 50–60% 60–70% 70–80% Karel: 40–50% 50–60% 60–70% 70–80%
Governor before election
Francis E. McGovern
Republican
Elected Governor
Francis E. McGovern
Republican

The 1912 Wisconsin gubernatorial election was held on November 5, 1912. Primary elections were held on September 3, 1912.

Incumbent Republican Governor Francis E. McGovern defeated Democratic nominee John C. Karel and Social-Democratic nominee Carl D. Thompson, with 45.54% of the vote. This was the closest gubernatorial election in Wisconsin during the Fourth Party System and one of only two decided by single digits during that era.

This was the tenth consecutive Republican victory in Wisconsin, breaking the previous record of nine consecutive wins that ran from 1855 through 1871. This streak would eventually reach 19 consecutive Republican wins before being broken in 1932.

== Primary election ==
=== Republican party ===
==== Candidates ====
- Francis E. McGovern, incumbent Governor

==== Results ====
Republican primary results
Party	Candidate	Votes	%
Republican	Francis E. McGovern (incumbent)	81,412	100.00%
Total votes		81,412	100.00%

=== Democratic party ===
==== Candidates ====
- John C. Karel, Milwaukee County Court judge
- Adolph J. Schmitz, lawyer, Democratic nominee for Lieutenant Governor in 1894, Democratic nominee for Governor in 1910

==== Results ====
Democratic primary results
Party	Candidate	Votes	%
Democratic	John C. Karel	48,455	57.29%
Democratic	Adolph J. Schmitz	36,117	42.71%
Total votes		84,572	100.00%

=== Social-Democratic party ===
==== Candidates ====
- Carl D. Thompson, former member of the Wisconsin State Assembly

==== Results ====
Social-Democratic primary results
Party	Candidate	Votes	%
Social-Democratic	Carl D. Thompson	12,726	100.00%
Total votes		12,726	100.00%

=== Prohibition party ===
==== Candidates ====
- Charles L. Hill, Prohibition nominee for Lieutenant Governor in 1910

==== Results ====
Prohibition primary results
Party	Candidate	Votes	%
Prohibition	Charles L. Hill	2,385	100.00%
Total votes		2,385	100.00%

== General election ==
=== Results ===
1912 Wisconsin gubernatorial election (Note: One must exercise caution using the Blue Book as a source for Wisconsin election data for the period of 1890-1920 as it was unreliable during this period. In this case, the Blue Book's totals for all candidates are incorrect and it also contains numerous mistakes in the county figures.)
Party	Candidate	Votes	%	±%
Republican	Francis E. McGovern (incumbent)	179,360	45.54%	−5.04%
Democratic	John C. Karel	167,316	42.48%	+7.92%
Social Democratic	Carl D. Thompson	34,468	8.75%	−3.63%
Prohibition	Charles L. Hill	9,433	2.40%	+0.06%
Socialist Labor	William H. Curtis	3,253	0.83%	+0.69%
	Scattering	19	0.00%	
Majority		12,044	3.06%	
Total votes		393,849	100.00%	
Republican hold		Swing	-12.96%	

=== Results by county ===
Karel was the first Democrat since George W. Peck in 1890 to carry Racine County. Additionally, Forest County, Portage County, Sheboygan County, and Waukesha County voted Democratic for the first time since 1892. After this election, Forest County, Marathon County, and Milwaukee County would not vote Democratic again until 1932.

Portage County voted for the losing candidate for the first time since 1873. Additionally, Waukesha County, Forest County, and Sheboygan County voted for the losing candidate for the first time since 1884, 1886, and 1888, respectively.

County	Francis E. McGovern Republican		John C. Karel Democratic		Carl D. Thompson Social-Democratic		Charles L. Hill Prohibition		William H. Curtis Socialist Labor		Margin		Total votes cast
County	#	%	#	%	#	%	#	%	#	%	#	%	Total votes cast
Adams	991	70.43%	326	23.17%	53	3.77%	34	2.42%	3	0.21%	665	47.26%	1,407
Ashland	1,797	52.96%	1,235	36.40%	243	7.16%	107	3.15%	11	0.32%	562	16.56%	3,393
Barron	2,360	62.30%	920	24.29%	226	5.97%	257	6.78%	24	0.63%	1,440	38.01%	3,788 (Note: Includes 1 Scattering vote)
Bayfield	1,239	57.49%	539	25.01%	275	12.76%	79	3.67%	23	1.07%	700	32.48%	2,155
Brown	3,936	48.84%	3,444	42.73%	510	6.33%	146	1.81%	23	0.29%	492	6.10%	8,059
Buffalo	1,525	62.99%	804	33.21%	28	1.16%	47	1.94%	17	0.70%	721	29.78%	2,421
Burnett	983	68.17%	214	14.84%	158	10.96%	54	3.74%	33	2.29%	768	53.33%	1,442
Calumet	1,317	46.90%	1,393	49.61%	65	2.31%	25	0.89%	8	0.28%	-76	-2.71%	2,808
Chippewa	2,471	50.45%	2,232	45.57%	83	1.69%	99	2.02%	12	0.24%	239	4.88%	4,898
Clark	2,650	61.06%	1,433	33.02%	115	2.65%	114	2.63%	28	0.65%	1,217	28.04%	4,340
Columbia	3,045	53.60%	2,395	42.16%	98	1.73%	132	2.32%	11	0.19%	650	11.44%	5,681
Crawford	1,571	47.29%	1,634	49.19%	49	1.48%	64	1.93%	4	0.12%	-63	-1.90%	3,322
Dane	8,358	51.81%	7,102	44.03%	232	1.44%	398	2.47%	41	0.25%	1,256	7.79%	16,131
Dodge	2,697	31.42%	5,656	65.89%	98	1.14%	129	1.50%	4	0.05%	-2,959	-34.47%	8,584
Door	1,358	50.04%	1,156	42.59%	67	2.47%	125	4.61%	8	0.29%	202	7.44%	2,714
Douglas	2,450	47.31%	1,584	30.59%	935	18.05%	148	2.86%	62	1.20%	866	16.72%	5,179
Dunn	2,571	73.25%	621	17.69%	205	5.84%	91	2.59%	22	0.63%	1,950	55.56%	3,510
Eau Claire	2,947	61.40%	1,497	31.19%	228	4.75%	108	2.25%	17	0.35%	1,450	30.21%	4,800 (Note: Includes 3 Scattering votes)
Florence	386	69.42%	146	26.26%	12	2.16%	11	1.98%	1	0.18%	240	43.17%	556
Fond du Lac	3,955	42.11%	4,824	51.37%	289	3.08%	314	3.34%	9	0.10%	-869	-9.25%	9,391
Forest	569	42.49%	693	51.76%	45	3.36%	29	2.17%	3	0.22%	-124	-9.26%	1,339
Grant	3,868	50.35%	3,496	45.51%	93	1.21%	214	2.79%	11	0.14%	372	4.84%	7,682
Green	2,044	50.73%	1,707	42.37%	85	2.11%	172	4.27%	20	0.50%	337	8.36%	4,029
Green Lake	1,299	44.17%	1,526	51.89%	39	1.33%	76	2.58%	1	0.03%	-227	-7.72%	2,941
Iowa	2,343	51.55%	2,009	44.20%	32	0.70%	160	3.52%	1	0.02%	334	7.35%	4,545
Iron	628	52.38%	450	37.53%	65	5.42%	31	2.59%	25	2.09%	178	14.85%	1,199
Jackson	1,830	72.16%	550	21.69%	68	2.68%	81	3.19%	7	0.28%	1,280	50.47%	2,536
Jefferson	2,075	30.15%	4,546	66.06%	101	1.47%	150	2.18%	8	0.12%	-2,471	-35.91%	6,882 (Note: Includes 2 Scattering votes)
Juneau	1,675	54.33%	1,179	38.24%	153	4.96%	62	2.01%	14	0.45%	496	16.09%	3,083
Kenosha	2,650	43.82%	2,722	45.01%	462	7.64%	175	2.89%	38	0.63%	-72	-1.19%	6,047
Kewaunee	1,415	45.72%	1,635	52.83%	19	0.61%	26	0.84%	0	0.00%	-220	-7.11%	3,095
La Crosse	3,688	47.09%	3,628	46.32%	346	4.42%	153	1.95%	17	0.22%	60	0.77%	7,832
Lafayette	2,414	54.00%	1,971	44.09%	19	0.43%	62	1.39%	4	0.09%	443	9.91%	4,470
Langlade	1,341	46.40%	1,446	50.03%	54	1.87%	45	1.56%	4	0.14%	-105	-3.63%	2,890
Lincoln	1,661	50.17%	1,421	42.92%	188	5.68%	29	0.88%	12	0.36%	240	7.25%	3,311
Manitowoc	2,951	38.59%	3,818	49.93%	808	10.57%	62	0.81%	8	0.10%	-867	-11.34%	7,647
Marathon	3,865	43.17%	4,374	48.86%	505	5.64%	176	1.97%	32	0.36%	-509	-5.69%	8,952
Marinette	2,612	55.72%	1,764	37.63%	210	4.48%	90	1.92%	12	0.26%	848	18.09%	4,688
Marquette	1,161	54.03%	925	43.04%	15	0.70%	44	2.05%	4	0.19%	236	10.98%	2,149
Milwaukee	17,771	24.15%	31,746	43.14%	21,301	28.94%	991	1.35%	1,785	2.43%	-10,445 (Note: Karel's margin over Thompson)	-14.19%	73,594
Monroe	2,441	52.68%	1,869	40.33%	117	2.52%	185	3.99%	22	0.47%	572	12.34%	4,634
Oconto	2,373	55.69%	1,710	40.13%	120	2.82%	46	1.08%	12	0.28%	663	15.56%	4,261
Oneida	1,107	55.13%	700	34.86%	169	8.42%	22	1.10%	10	0.50%	407	20.27%	2,008
Outagamie	4,076	49.10%	3,831	46.15%	179	2.16%	157	1.89%	59	0.71%	245	2.95%	8,302
Ozaukee	714	24.87%	2,074	72.24%	55	1.92%	22	0.77%	6	0.21%	-1,360	-47.37%	2,871
Pepin	748	59.70%	453	36.15%	21	1.68%	27	2.15%	4	0.32%	295	23.54%	1,253
Pierce	2,295	71.10%	694	21.50%	81	2.51%	100	3.10%	58	1.80%	1,601	49.60%	3,228
Polk	2,095	70.47%	465	15.64%	266	8.95%	106	3.57%	41	1.38%	1,630	54.83%	2,973
Portage	2,366	45.36%	2,652	50.84%	99	1.90%	89	1.71%	10	0.19%	-286	-5.48%	5,216
Price	1,225	53.68%	682	29.89%	273	11.96%	67	2.94%	35	1.53%	543	23.79%	2,282
Racine	3,725	43.05%	3,918	45.28%	550	6.36%	328	3.79%	120	1.39%	-193	-2.23%	8,652 (Note: Includes 11 Scattering votes)
Richland	1,930	50.43%	1,444	37.73%	107	2.80%	331	8.65%	15	0.39%	486	12.70%	3,827
Rock	4,717	49.14%	4,263	44.41%	227	2.36%	319	3.32%	74	0.77%	454	4.73%	9,600
Rusk	976	59.26%	427	25.93%	181	10.99%	50	3.04%	13	0.79%	549	33.33%	1,647
Sauk	2,774	50.61%	2,348	42.84%	58	1.06%	290	5.29%	11	0.20%	426	7.77%	5,481
Sawyer	485	56.07%	354	40.92%	10	1.16%	15	1.73%	1	0.12%	131	15.14%	865
Shawano	2,753	62.94%	1,386	31.69%	107	2.45%	114	2.61%	14	0.32%	1,367	31.25%	4,374
Sheboygan	4,197	43.61%	4,227	43.92%	1,047	10.88%	138	1.43%	16	0.17%	-30	-0.31%	9,625
St. Croix	2,442	54.98%	1,720	38.72%	152	3.42%	121	2.72%	7	0.16%	722	16.25%	4,442
Taylor	1,195	53.71%	757	34.02%	246	11.06%	21	0.94%	6	0.27%	438	19.69%	2,225
Trempealeau	2,474	64.82%	1,206	31.60%	39	1.02%	93	2.44%	5	0.13%	1,268	33.22%	3,817
Vernon	2,880	64.75%	1,310	29.45%	70	1.57%	174	3.91%	14	0.31%	1,570	35.30%	4,448
Vilas	416	47.22%	383	43.47%	61	6.92%	12	1.36%	9	1.02%	33	3.75%	881
Walworth	2,835	51.03%	2,287	41.16%	88	1.58%	325	5.85%	21	0.38%	548	9.86%	5,556
Washburn	821	53.49%	476	31.01%	193	12.57%	40	2.61%	5	0.33%	345	22.48%	1,535
Washington	1,803	38.39%	2,735	58.24%	138	2.94%	20	0.43%	0	0.00%	-932	-19.85%	4,696
Waukesha	3,235	44.64%	3,521	48.59%	183	2.53%	295	4.07%	13	0.18%	-286	-3.95%	7,247
Waupaca	3,741	68.12%	1,339	24.38%	141	2.57%	199	3.62%	72	1.31%	2,402	43.74%	5,492
Waushara	2,142	73.18%	586	20.02%	75	2.56%	93	3.18%	31	1.06%	1,556	53.16%	2,927
Winnebago	5,490	51.05%	4,398	40.90%	498	4.63%	202	1.88%	166	1.54%	1,092	10.15%	10,754
Wood	2,422	46.22%	2,340	44.66%	340	6.49%	122	2.33%	16	0.31%	82	1.56%	5,240
Total	179,360	45.54%	167,316	42.48%	34,468	8.75%	9,433	2.40%	3,253	0.83%	12,044	3.06%	393,849

==== Counties that flipped from Republican to Democratic ====
- Crawford
- Fond du Lac
- Forest
- Green Lake
- Langlade
- Portage
- Racine
- Sheboygan
- Waukesha

==== Counties that flipped from Social Democratic to Democratic ====
- Milwaukee

== Bibliography ==
- Glashan, Roy R. (1979). American Governors and Gubernatorial Elections, 1775-1978. Meckler Books. ISBN 0-930466-17-9.
- Gubernatorial Elections, 1787-1997. Washington, D.C.: Congressional Quarterly Inc. 1998. ISBN 1-56802-396-0.
- The Wisconsin Blue Book. Madison, Wisconsin: Democrat Printing Co., State Printer. 1913.
