= Charles A. Kading =

20th century American politician

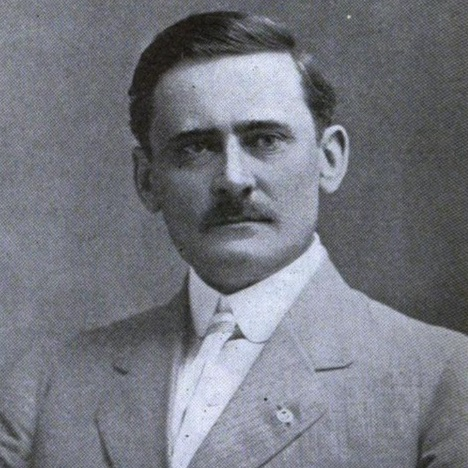
- From the May 1914 issue of The Wisconsin Municipality

Member of the U.S. House of Representatives from Wisconsin's 2nd district
- In office March 4, 1927 – March 3, 1933
- Preceded by: Edward Voigt
- Succeeded by: Charles W. Henney

38th Mayor of Watertown, Wisconsin
- In office April 1914 – April 1916
- Preceded by: Herman G. Grube
- Succeeded by: Charles Mulberger

District Attorney of Dodge County, Wisconsin
- In office January 1, 1907 – January 1, 1913
- Preceded by: Paul O. Husting
- Succeeded by: James F. Malone

Personal details
- Born: January 14, 1874 Lowell, Wisconsin, U.S.
- Died: June 19, 1956 (aged 82) Watertown, Wisconsin, U.S.
- Resting place: Oak Hill Cemetery, Watertown
- Party: Republican
- Spouse: Elizabeth Sommers Holste
- Children: Charles Earl Kading; (b. 1907; died 1992)
- Education: University of Wisconsin–Madison; Valparaiso University
- Profession: Lawyer

Charles August Kading (January 14, 1874 – June 19, 1956) was an American lawyer and Republican politician from Dodge County, Wisconsin. He served three terms in the United States House of Representatives, representing Wisconsin's 2nd congressional district from 1927 to 1933. Before his election to Congress, he served as Dodge County district attorney and he was the 38th mayor of Watertown, Wisconsin. His name was incorrectly listed as "Karling" in the 1911 Wisconsin Blue Book.

== Biography ==
Born in Lowell, Wisconsin, Kading was the son of Charles and Elizabeth Baggans Kading. He attended the country schools, Lowell Grade School, Horicon High School in Horicon, and the University of Wisconsin in Madison. He graduated from the law department of Valparaiso University in Valparaiso, Indiana, in 1900. He was admitted to the bar the same year and commenced practice in Watertown, Wisconsin. He was also interested in agricultural pursuits.

Kading served as city attorney of Watertown from 1905 to 1912, as district attorney for Dodge County from 1906 to 1912, and as mayor of Watertown from 1914 to 1916.

Kading was elected as a Republican to the Seventieth, Seventy-first, and Seventy-second Congresses, serving from March 4, 1927 – March 3, 1933. After being an unsuccessful candidate for renomination in 1932, he resumed the practice of law. He died in Watertown on June 19, 1956, and was interred in Oak Hill Cemetery there. His son, Charles E. Kading (1907–1992), also an attorney, served for many years as a judge in Jefferson County.

U.S. House of Representatives
Preceded by Edward Voigt	Member of the U.S. House of Representatives from Wisconsin's 2nd congressional district 1927–1933	Succeeded by Charles W. Henney
Political offices
Preceded by Herman G. Grube	Mayor of Watertown, Wisconsin; April 1914 – April 1916	Succeeded by Charles Mulberger
Legal offices
Preceded by Paul O. Husting	District Attorney of Dodge County, Wisconsin; January 1, 1907 – January 1, 1913	Succeeded by James F. Malone
