= Paul O. Husting =

American lawyer and politician (1866–1917)

Paul Husting
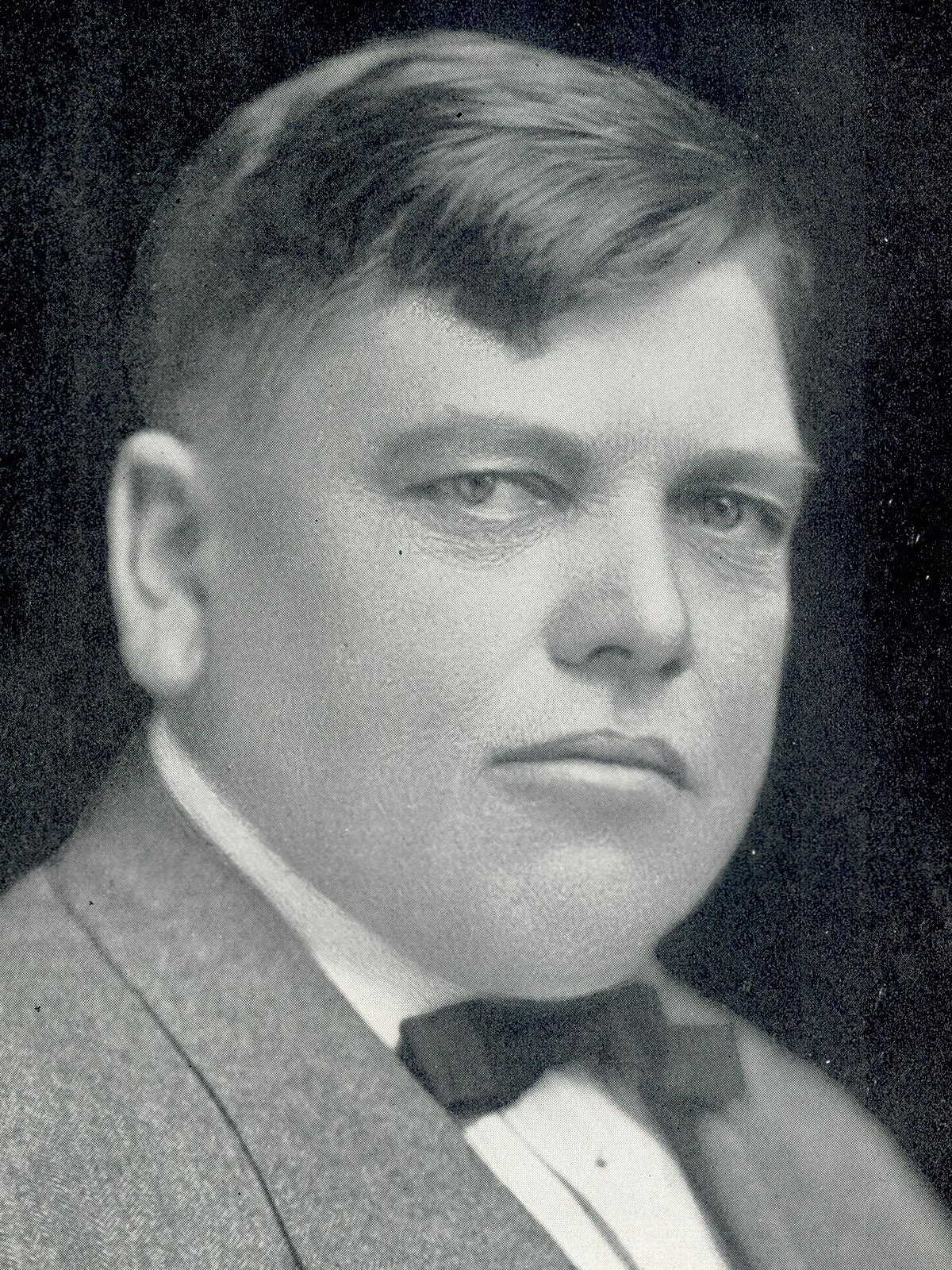
- Portrait from The Wisconsin Blue Book 1917

United States Senator from Wisconsin
- In office March 4, 1915 – October 21, 1917
- Preceded by: Isaac Stephenson
- Succeeded by: Irvine Lenroot

Member of the Wisconsin Senate from the 13th district
- In office January 7, 1907 – January 4, 1915
- Preceded by: William Campbell North
- Succeeded by: Byron Barwig

District Attorney of Dodge County, Wisconsin
- In office January 1, 1903 – January 1, 1907
- Preceded by: Martin L. Lueck
- Succeeded by: Charles A. Kading

Personal details
- Born: April 25, 1866 Fond du Lac, Wisconsin, U.S.
- Died: October 21, 1917 (aged 51) Rush Lake, Wisconsin, U.S.
- Resting place: Graceland Cemetery, Mayville, Wisconsin
- Party: Democratic
- Spouse: none
- Children: none
- Relatives: Bert Husting (brother); Solomon Juneau (grandfather)
- Education: University of Wisconsin, Madison
- Profession: Lawyer

Paul Oscar Adolph Husting (April 25, 1866 – October 21, 1917) was an American lawyer and Democratic politician from Mayville, Wisconsin. He was the first popularly-elected United States senator from Wisconsin, serving from 1915 until his death in 1917. He previously served eight years in the Wisconsin Senate, representing Dodge County, and was district attorney for four years. He was a grandson of Solomon Juneau, the founder of Milwaukee.

Husting is the last senator of this seat to date who did not lose reelection or renomination.

== Background and early career ==
Husting was born April 25, 1866, in Fond du Lac, Wisconsin. Husting moved with his parents to Mayville, Wisconsin, in 1876, where he received a common school education. From the age of 17 years, he became successively a retail clerk in a general store, a railway postal clerk, a mailing clerk in the Wisconsin State Prison at Waupun, and assistant bookkeeper in the office of the Secretary of State of Wisconsin under Thomas J. Cunningham.

Husting entered the University of Wisconsin Law School, passed the state bar examination, and was admitted to the bar in 1895. He initially practiced law in Mayville by himself, but in 1897 associated himself with C. W. Lamoreux until the latter was elected judge, upon which the firm of Husting & Brother was formed.

== Public office ==
Husting was elected district attorney of Dodge County in 1902 and reelected in 1904. He was elected to the state senate in 1906, and reelected in 1910. In the state senate, he advocated conservation of the state's natural resources, the income tax, the "Husting bill" establishing a maximum passenger railroad fare of two cents per mile, initiative and referendum, and direct election of United States senators. He offered the original resolution to investigate, and assisted in the investigation of, the Wisconsin primary and election of 1908, which resulted in the enactment of the state's Corrupt Practices Act.

Husting was the first United States senator from Wisconsin to be elected by a direct vote of the people, defeating the incumbent Governor, Francis E. McGovern, at the November 1914 election by 967 votes. He succeeded Isaac Stephenson as the United States senator on March 4, 1915, and served in the Senate from 1915 until his death. During his time in the U.S. Senate, he was chairman of the Committee on Fisheries during 1917 and chairman of a special committee investigating trespasses on Indian lands during his entire time in the Senate.

Husting was the only Democrat to win a state-wide election in Wisconsin between 1892 and 1932.

== Death and political consequences ==
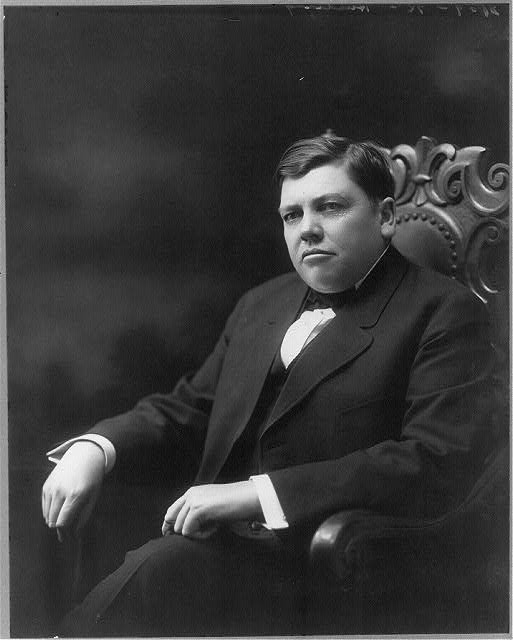
Photo from the Library of Congress

Husting was killed in a duck hunting accident on Rush Lake near Pickett, Wisconsin. While Husting was rising in a row boat after telling his brother Gustav to fire, Gustav accidentally shot his brother in the back. Husting fell into a coma, and died later that same day. The New York Times described him as "the most aggressive leader" of the "loyalist" (e.g. supportive of Woodrow Wilson's pro-Allied policies) forces in Wisconsin, and contrasted him with "Senator La Follette and the pro-German constituency behind him". He is interred on the Husting family plot at Graceland Cemetery in Mayville.

Husting's death was of political importance. In 1919 the Senate would have been under Democratic control had he not been succeeded by Republican Irvine Lenroot, as a consequence of which in 1919 the Senate had 49 Republicans and 47 Democrats (Vice-President Thomas R. Marshall was a Democrat, and had the power to break all ties).

== Personal life and family ==
Paul Husting was the second of seven children born to John P. and Mary M. (née Juneau) Husting. John P. Husting had emigrated to Wisconsin from the Grand Duchy of Luxemburg in 1855. Mary M. Juneau was the twelfth of sixteen children born to Solomon Juneau—the co-founder and first mayor of Milwaukee, Wisconsin.

Husting's younger brother, Berthold Juneau "Bert" Husting, had a brief career in professional baseball and was later United States Attorney for the Eastern District of Wisconsin in the 1940s.

His older brother, Charles Ottomar "Otto" Husting, served as Paul's private secretary in the U.S. Senate.

== Electoral history ==
=== Wisconsin Senate (1906, 1910) ===
Wisconsin Senate, 13th District election, 1906
Party	Candidate	Votes	%	±%
General Election, November 6, 1906
Democratic	Paul O. Husting	4,646	61.81%	+0.08%
Republican	Leon Reible	2,746	36.54%	+0.26%
Prohibition	G. A. Paddock	124	1.65%	−0.35%
Plurality		1,900	25.28%	-0.18%
Total votes		7,516	100.0%	-8.40%
Democratic hold				

Wisconsin Senate, 13th District election, 1910
Party	Candidate	Votes	%	±%
General Election, November 8, 1910
Democratic	Paul O. Husting (incumbent)	4,734	62.38%	+0.56%
Republican	C. M. Davidson	2,612	34.42%	−2.12%
Social Democratic	Rae Weaver	164	2.16%	
Prohibition	Benjamin F. Sawyer	79	1.04%	−0.61%
Plurality		2,122	27.96%	+2.68%
Total votes		7,589	100.0%	+0.97%
Democratic hold				

=== U.S. Senate (1914) ===
United States Senate election in Wisconsin, 1914
Party	Candidate	Votes	%	±%
Democratic primary, September 1, 1914
Democratic	Paul O. Husting	35,963	54.93%	
Democratic	Thomas Kearney	29,459	45.00%	
Write-in		47	0.07%	
Plurality		6,504	9.93%	
Total votes		65,469	100.0%	
General election, November 3, 1914
Democratic	Paul O. Husting	134,925	43.81%	
Republican	Francis E. McGovern	133,969	43.50%	
Social Democratic	Emil Seidel	29,774	9.67%	
Prohibition	Charles L. Hill	9,276	3.01%	
Write-in		58	0.02%	
Plurality		956	0.31%	
Total votes		308,002	100.0%	
Democratic gain from Republican				

== See also ==
- List of members of the United States Congress who died in office (1900–1949)

Party political offices
First	Democratic nominee for U.S. Senator from Wisconsin (Class 3); 1914	Succeeded by Joseph Davies
Wisconsin Senate
Preceded by William Campbell North	Member of the Wisconsin Senate from the 13th district January 7, 1907 – January 4, 1915	Succeeded by Byron Barwig
U.S. Senate
Preceded by Isaac Stephenson	United States Senator (Class 3) from Wisconsin; 1915–1917; Served alongside: Bob La Follette	Succeeded by Irvine Lenroot
Preceded by Henry F. Ashurst	Chair of the Senate Indian Land Trespassers Committee; 1915–1917	Succeeded by Wesley Jones
Preceded by Harry Lane	Chair of the Senate Fisheries Committee; 1917	Position abolished
Legal offices
Preceded by Martin L. Lueck	District Attorney of Dodge County, Wisconsin; January 1, 1903 – January 1, 1907	Succeeded by Charles A. Kading
