= Cyrus L. Philipp =

American politician

Cyrus L. Philipp was Chairman of the Republican Party of Wisconsin from 1934 to 1938. Additionally, he was a member of the Republican National Committee from 1944 to 1952 and was active in the Milwaukee County, Wisconsin Republican Party. Philipp was also a delegate to the 1952 Republican National Convention. His father, Emanuel, was Governor of Wisconsin.
