= 1936 Georgia gubernatorial election =

1936 Georgia Democratic gubernatorial primary
- September 9, 1936

410 county unit votes 206 unit votes needed to win
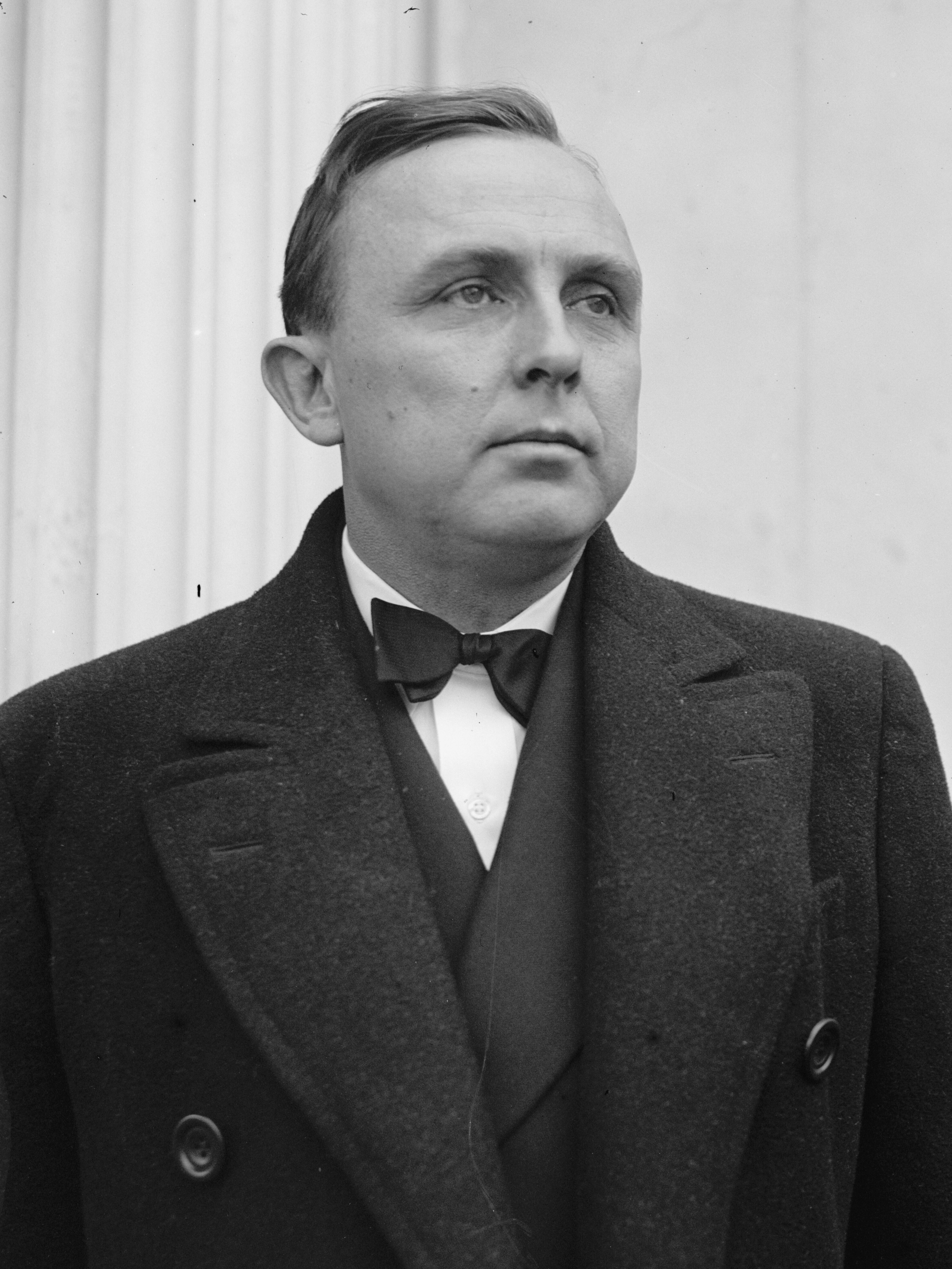

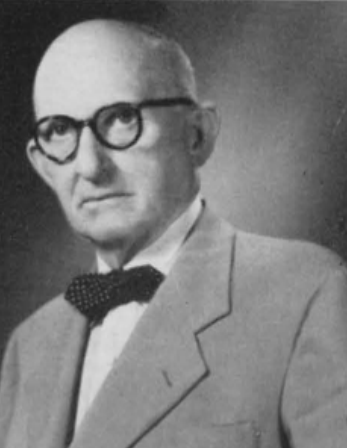

Nominee	Eurith D. Rivers	Charles D. Redwine	Blanton Fortson
Party	Democratic	Democratic	Democratic
Electoral vote	372	30	8
Popular vote	233,503	123,095	32,715
Percentage	59.98%	31.62%	8.40%
- County results Rivers: 30-40% 40-50% 50-60% 60-70% 70-80% 80-90% Redwine: 40-50% 50-60% 60-70% Fortson: 40-50% 80-90%
Governor before election
Eugene Talmadge
Democratic
Elected Governor
Eurith D. Rivers
Democratic

The 1936 Georgia gubernatorial election took place on November 3, 1936, in order to elect the governor of Georgia.

Incumbent Democratic governor Eugene Talmadge was term-limited, and would become eligible to run for a third term only after spending four years out of office (thus in 1940). Talmadge instead ran for the U.S. Senate.

As was common at the time, the Democratic candidate ran with only token opposition in the general election so therefore the Democratic primary was the real contest, and winning the primary was considered tantamount to election. Despite the token opposition from Prohibition nominee L.P. Glass, this was the first gubernatorial election to have a non-Democrat on the ballot since the 1912 special election.

== Democratic primary ==
The Democratic primary election was held on September 9, 1936. As Rivers won a majority of county unit votes, there was no run-off.

=== County unit system ===
From 1917 until 1962, the Democratic Party in the U.S. state of Georgia used a voting system called the county unit system to determine victors in statewide primary elections.

The system was ostensibly designed to function similarly to the Electoral College, but in practice the large ratio of unit votes for small, rural counties to unit votes for more populous urban areas provided outsized political influence to the smaller counties.

Under the county unit system, the 159 counties in Georgia were divided by population into three categories. The largest eight counties were classified as "Urban", the next-largest 30 counties were classified as "Town", and the remaining 121 counties were classified as "Rural". Urban counties were given 6 unit votes, Town counties were given 4 unit votes, and Rural counties were given 2 unit votes, for a total of 410 available unit votes. Each county's unit votes were awarded on a winner-take-all basis.

Candidates were required to obtain a majority of unit votes (not necessarily a majority of the popular vote), or 206 total unit votes, to win the election. If no candidate received a majority in the initial primary, a runoff election was held between the top two candidates to determine a winner.

=== Candidates ===
- Blanton Fortson, Georgia Superior Court judge
- Charles D. Redwine, President of the Georgia State Senate
- Eurith D. Rivers, Speaker of the Georgia House of Representatives and unsuccessful candidate for Democratic nomination for governor in 1928 and 1930

=== Results ===
Candidate	Popular vote		County unit vote	
Candidate	Votes	%	Votes	%
Eurith D. Rivers	233,503	59.98	372	90.73
Charles D. Redwine	123,095	31.62	30	7.32
Blanton Fortson	32,715	8.40	8	1.95
Total	389,313	100.00	410	100.00

== General election ==
In the general election, Rivers faced token opposition.

=== Results ===
1936 Georgia gubernatorial election
Party	Candidate	Votes	%	±%
Democratic	Eurith D. Rivers	263,140	99.67%	
Prohibition	L. P. Glass	873	0.33%	
Turnout		264,013	100.00%	
Democratic hold		Swing		

== Bibliography ==
- Gubernatorial Elections, 1787-1997. Washington, D.C.: Congressional Quarterly Inc. 1998. ISBN 1-56802-396-0.
- Glashan, Roy R. (1979). American Governors and Gubernatorial Elections, 1775-1978. Meckler Books. ISBN 0-930466-17-9.
- Compiled by Mrs. J.E. Hays, State Historian and Director (1937). Georgia's Official Register, 1933-1935-1937 (PDF). Atlanta, GA: State of Georgia, Department of Archives and History.
