= Harry W. Bolens House =

Historic house in Wisconsin, United States

- U.S. National Register of Historic Places
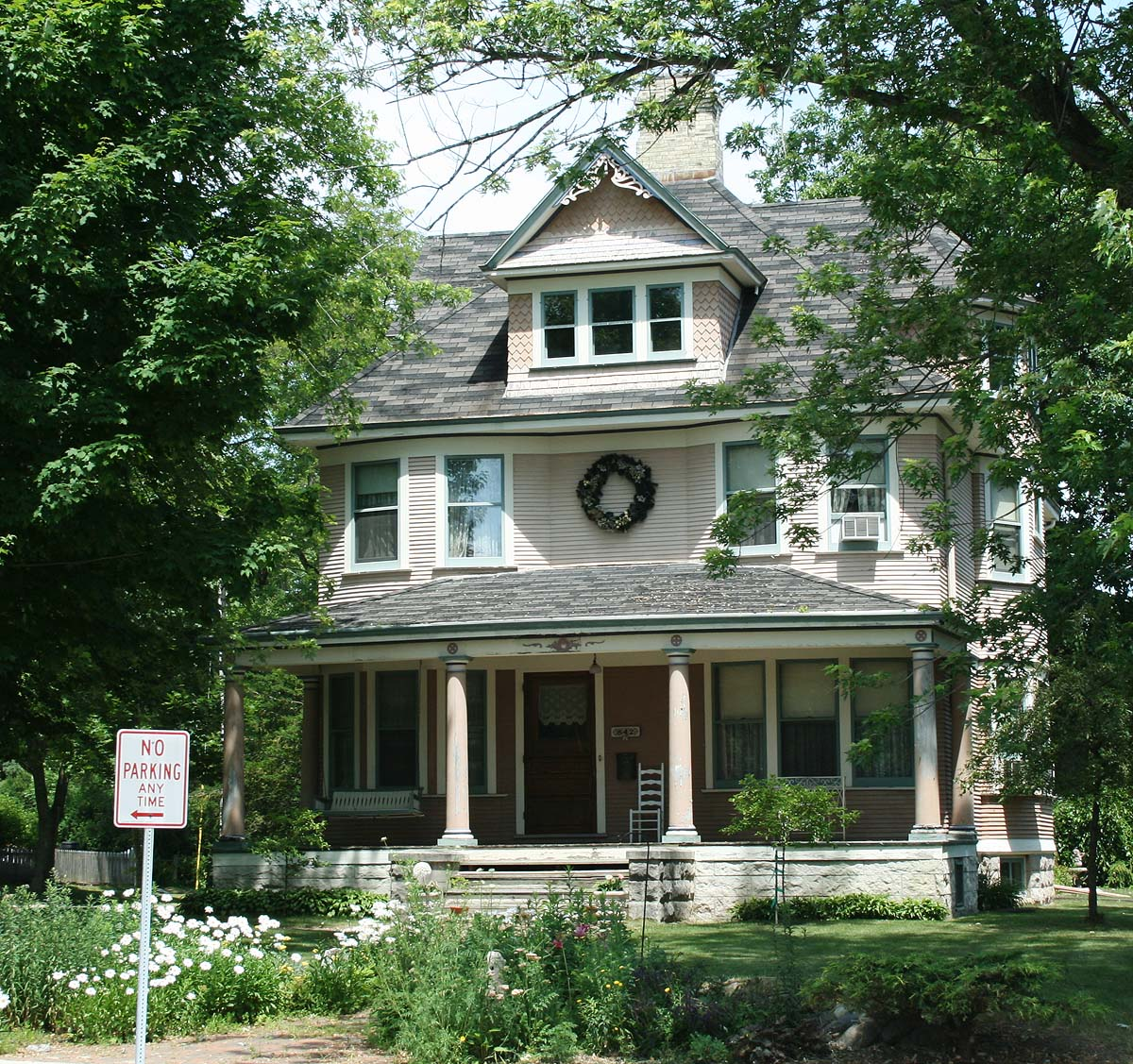

- Location within Wisconsin Location within the United States
- Location: 842 W. Grand Ave. Port Washington, Wisconsin
- Coordinates: 43°23′13″N 87°53′12″W
- Area: less than one acre
- Built: 1900
- Architect: D. B. Stone
- NRHP reference No.: 83003407
- Added to NRHP: August 25, 1983

The Harry W. Bolens House is a historic house located at 842 West Grand Street in Port Washington, Wisconsin.

== Description and history ==
Built in 1910, the 2 1/2-story house once served as the home of State Senator Harry W. Bolens. The house was added to the National Register of Historic Places on August 25, 1983.
