= Emanuel L. Philipp =

American politician (1861–1925)

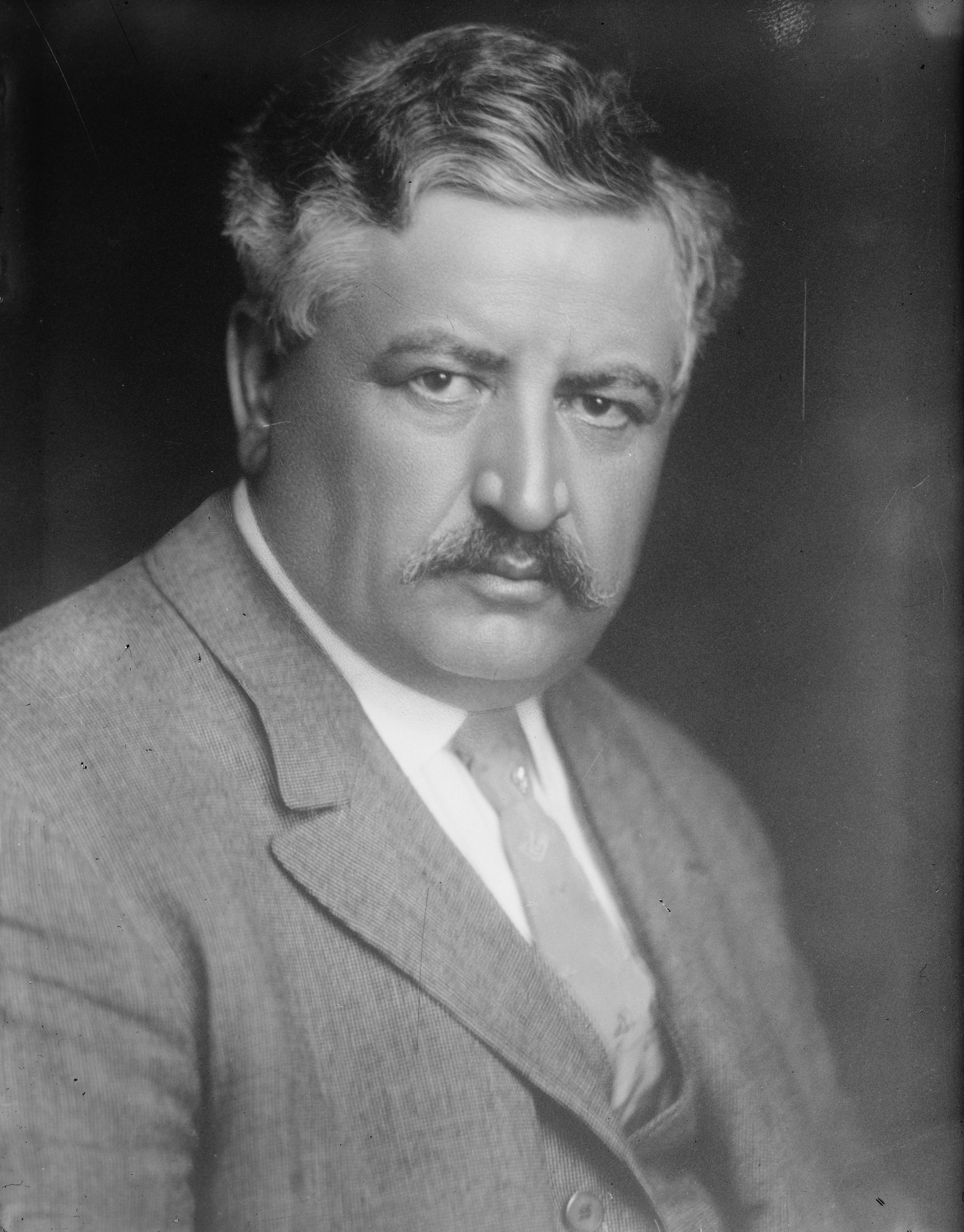
- Philipp in 1914

23rd Governor of Wisconsin
- In office January 4, 1915 – January 3, 1921
- Lieutenant: Edward Dithmar
- Preceded by: Francis E. McGovern
- Succeeded by: John J. Blaine

Personal details
- Born: Emanuel Lorenz Philipp; March 25, 1861 Honey Creek, Wisconsin, U.S.
- Died: June 15, 1925 (aged 64) Milwaukee, Wisconsin, U.S.
- Resting place: Forest Home Cemetery; Milwaukee, Wisconsin, U.S.
- Party: Republican
- Spouse: Bertha Schweke
- Children: 3, including Cyrus L. Philipp
- Profession: Railroad executive

Emanuel Lorenz Philipp (March 25, 1861 – June 15, 1925) was an American railroad executive and politician from Wisconsin, who served as the 23rd governor of Wisconsin from 1915 to 1921.

== Early life ==
Philipp was born in Honey Creek, Sauk County, Wisconsin, the son of Sabina (née Ludwig) and Luzi Philipp. He attended the common schools and worked as a railroad telegraph operator in Baraboo, Wisconsin before becoming the telegrapher and agent for the Chicago and North Western Railway in Lodi, Wisconsin.

== Career ==
Philipp also worked for the Gould transcontinental system and as traffic manager for Schlitz Brewery Company.

While he was a manager of a lumber company in Mississippi from 1894 to 1902, he founded the unincorporated community of Philipp in Tallahatchie County, Mississippi. He bought the Union Refrigerator Transit Company in St. Louis in 1903, and reorganized it as the Union Refrigerator Transit Company of Wisconsin after moving it to Milwaukee, Wisconsin.

== Political career ==
He held various political positions in Wisconsin. He served with Robert M. La Follette, Sr. as chairman of the Milwaukee County Convention, before disagreeing with him over railroad oversight. From 1909 to 1914, he was the Milwaukee Police Commissioner.

A conservative Republican, he wrote, with the help of Edgar Werlock, Political Reform in Wisconsin: A Historical Review of the Subjects of Primary Election, Taxation and Railway Regulation (1910).

=== Governorship of Wisconsin ===
In 1914, Philipp was nominated for Governor of Wisconsin, and first won the 1914 Wisconsin gubernatorial election. He would go on to be reelected twice, and served as the 23rd Governor of Wisconsin from 1915 to 1921.

During the First World War he was accused of holding divided loyalty's between the United States and the German Empire by his political opposition. Under his governorship during the war Wisconsin would see the rise of an anti-German American faction, typically referred to as "hyper patriots". He would go on and be successful in combating violent anti-German hysteria in the state. After leaving office, he returned to his business pursuits. He operated two model farms and was regent of Marquette University.

== Death ==
Philipp died on June 15, 1925, aged 64, in Milwaukee and is interred at Forest Home Cemetery in Milwaukee.

== Family life ==
Philipp married Bertha Schweke in 1887, and they had three children. Their son Cyrus L. Philipp served as the Chairman of the Republican Party of Wisconsin.

Party political offices
Preceded by Francis E. McGovern	Republican nominee for Governor of Wisconsin; 1914, 1916, 1918	Succeeded by John J. Blaine
Political offices
Preceded by Francis E. McGovern	Governor of Wisconsin; 1915–1921	Succeeded by John J. Blaine
