= 1912 Dominican Republic general election =

General elections were held in the Dominican Republic in 1912. Eladio Victoria was elected president by an electoral college.

== Results ==
=== President ===
| Candidate | Votes | % |
|---|---|---|
| Eladio Victoria | 550 | 87.44 |
| Horacio Vásquez | 46 | 7.31 |
| Federico Velásquez | 9 | 1.43 |
| Francisco Henríquez y Carvajal | 3 | 0.48 |
| Miguel A. Román | 3 | 0.48 |
| Juan Isidro Jimenes Pereyra | 2 | 0.32 |
| Armando Lamarche | 2 | 0.32 |
| Manuel Ubaldo Gómez | 2 | 0.32 |
| Juan A. Alvarez | 1 | 0.16 |
| Agustín Aristy | 1 | 0.16 |
| Juan C. | 1 | 0.16 |
| José María Cabral y Báez | 1 | 0.16 |
| Cirilo Castellanos | 1 | 0.16 |
| Maximiliano Cocco | 1 | 0.16 |
| Federico Henríquez y Carvajal | 1 | 0.16 |
| Carlos F. Morales | 1 | 0.16 |
| Genero Pérez | 1 | 0.16 |
| Francisco J. Peynado | 1 | 0.16 |
| Alfredo Victoria | 1 | 0.16 |
| Eduardo Victoria | 1 | 0.16 |
| Total | 629 | 100.00 |
| Total votes | 629 | – |
| Registered voters/turnout | 632 | 99.53 |
Source: Campillo Pérez
