= Carl Busacker =

American politician

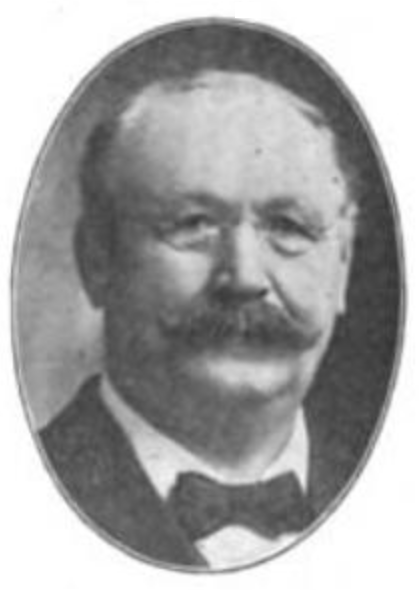

Member of the Wisconsin State Assembly
- In office 1908–1910
- Constituency: Milwaukee County Twelfth District

Personal details
- Born: Carl F. Busacker; April 3, 1854 Pomerania
- Died: 1943 (aged 88–89)
- Party: Republican
- Occupation: Politician

Carl Busacker (April 3, 1854 – 1943) was a member of the Wisconsin State Assembly.

== Biography ==
Busacker was born on April 3, 1854, in Pomerania, then in Prussia. He would go on to serve in the Imperial German Army. He died in 1943.

== Assembly career ==
Busacker was elected to the Assembly in 1908. He was a Republican.
