= August Dietrich =

American politician

August Dietrich (July 6, 1858 – ?) was an American politician.

Born in New York City, he was educated in Milwaukee, Wisconsin and was in the manufacturing and real estate business. He served in the Milwaukee Common Council and on the Milwaukee Civil Service Commission. In 1905 and 1913, Dietrich served in the Wisconsin State Assembly and was a Republican.
