= 1912 Monegasque general election =

General elections were held in Monaco on 21 April 1912 to elect the 20 members of the National Council. Only 20 candidates participated in the election.

== Results ==
Candidate	Votes	%
Théodore Gastaud	411	98.56
Théophile Gastaud	408	97.84
Antoine Marsan	406	97.36
Suffren Reymond	406	97.36
Laurent Olivié	398	95.44
Michel Fontana	397	95.20
Louis Néri	397	95.20
Séraphin Olivié	396	94.96
François Crovetto	394	94.48
François Médecin	394	94.48
Auguste Blot	386	92.57
Jean Jungman	384	92.09
François Blanchy	383	91.85
André Notari	383	91.85
Jean Vatrican	379	90.89
Eugène Marquet	378	90.65
Honoré Bellando	298	71.46
Alexandre Melin	287	68.82
Alexandre Médecin	285	68.35
François Devissi	222	53.24
Total	7,392	100.00
Valid votes	417	97.43
Invalid/blank votes	11	2.57
Total votes	428	100.00
Registered voters/turnout	635	67.40
