= 1912 Bolivian legislative election =

Bolivia held parliamentary elections in May 1912, electing a new National Congress (for half the seats of the Deputies and 1/3 the seats of the Senators).

== Results ==
Party	Seats			
Party	Chamber (won)	Chamber (total)	Senate (won)	Senate (total)
Liberal Party	35	70	6	16
Total	35	70	6	16
Source: Cáceres

=== Elected members ===
The new senators were:

- Mariano Méndez Roca, (Beni)
- David Cronenbold, (Béni)
- Cupertino Arteaga, (Chuquisaca)
- Benedicto Goytia, (La Paz)
- Ángel Menacho, (Santa Cruz)
- Adolfo Trigo Achá, (Tarija)
