= Harry W. Bolens =

American politician

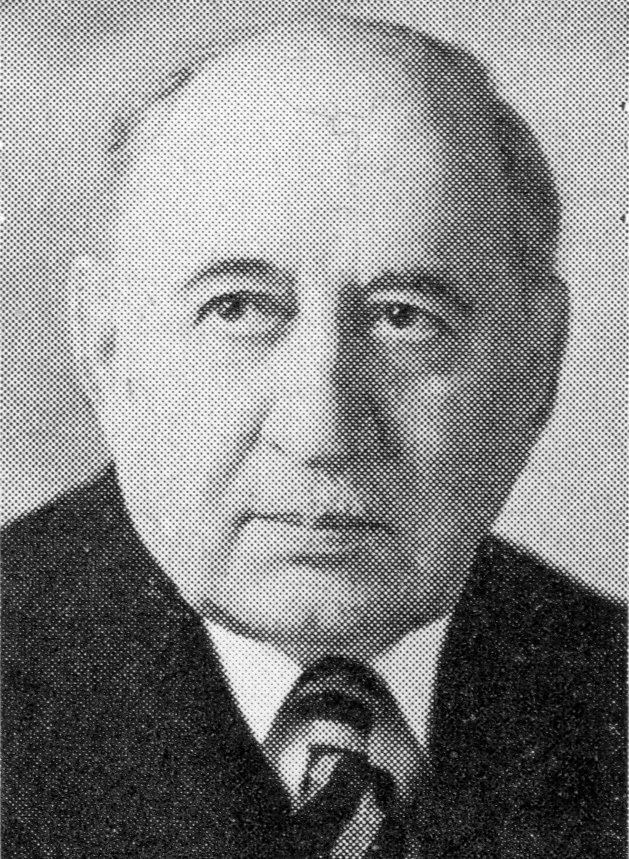

Member of the Wisconsin Senate from the 2nd district
- In office 1933–1940

Harry W. Bolens (January 13, 1864 – 1944) was a member of the Wisconsin State Senate.

== Biography ==
Bolens was born Harry Wilbur Bolens in Washington, Iowa, in 1864. He moved with his family to Wisconsin in 1866, settling in Janesville, Wisconsin. Later, they moved to Port Washington, Wisconsin. in 1879, Bolens served in the United States Army during the Spanish–American War. Bolens died on October 24, 1944, at his home. His former home, now known as the Harry W. Bolens House, is listed on the National Register of Historic Places.

== Career ==
Bolens was Mayor of Port Washington from 1906 to 1908 and again from 1910 to 1914. He also served on the Port Washington Common Council and on the Ozaukee County Board of Supervisors and was chairman of the county board In 1920, Bolens was a candidate for the United States House of Representatives from Wisconsin's 2nd congressional district. He lost to incumbent Edward Voigt. Bolens was a member of the Senate from 1933 to 1940. In 1938, he was a candidate for Governor of Wisconsin, losing to Julius P. Heil. Bolens was also a delegate to the 1944 Democratic National Convention.

Party political offices
Preceded by Robert Kirkland Henry; Withdrew	Democratic nominee for Governor of Wisconsin; 1938	Succeeded by Francis E. McGovern
