= 1912 Texas lieutenant gubernatorial election =

- November 5, 1912
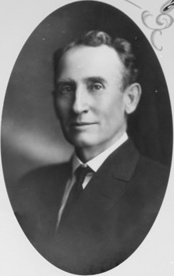

Nominee	William Harding Mayes	T. A. Hickey
Party	Democratic	Socialist
Popular vote	236,284	24,219
Percentage	77.94%	7.99%
Nominee	W. C. Averill	W. H. Featherstone
Party	Republican	Progressive
Popular vote	23,310	16,859
Percentage	7.69%	5.56%
Lieutenant Governor before election
Asbury Bascom Davidson
Democratic
Elected Lieutenant Governor
William Harding Mayes
Democratic

The 1912 Texas lieutenant gubernatorial election was held on November 5, 1912, in order to elect the lieutenant governor of Texas. Democratic nominee William Harding Mayes defeated Socialist nominee T. A. Hickey, Republican nominee W. C. Averill, Progressive nominee W. H. Featherstone, Prohibition nominee L. M. Hewitt and Socialist Labor nominee Robert Strach.

== General election ==
On election day, November 5, 1912, Democratic nominee William Harding Mayes won the election by a margin of 212,065 votes against his foremost opponent Socialist nominee T. A. Hickey, thereby retaining Democratic control over the office of lieutenant governor. Mayes was sworn in as the 23rd lieutenant governor of Texas on January 21, 1913.

=== Results ===
Texas lieutenant gubernatorial election, 1912
Party	Candidate	Votes	%
Democratic	William Harding Mayes	236,284	77.94
Socialist	T. A. Hickey	24,219	7.99
Republican	W. C. Averill	23,310	7.69
Progressive	W. H. Featherstone	16,859	5.56
Prohibition	L. M. Hewitt	2,119	0.70
Socialist Labor	Robert Strach	351	0.12
Total votes		303,142	100.00
Democratic hold			
