= 1912 Missouri lieutenant gubernatorial election =

- November 5, 1912
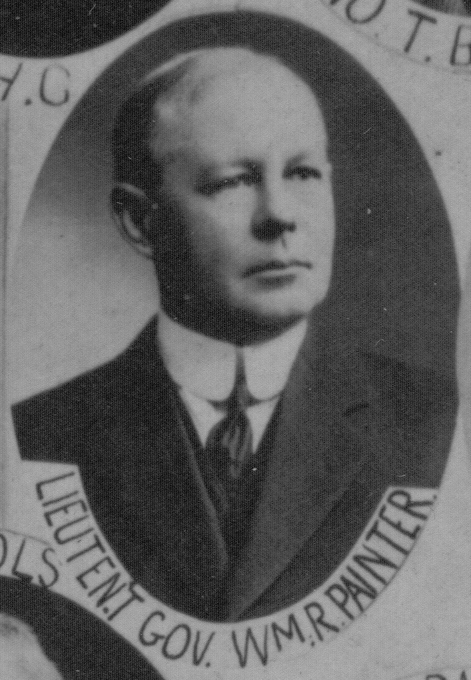

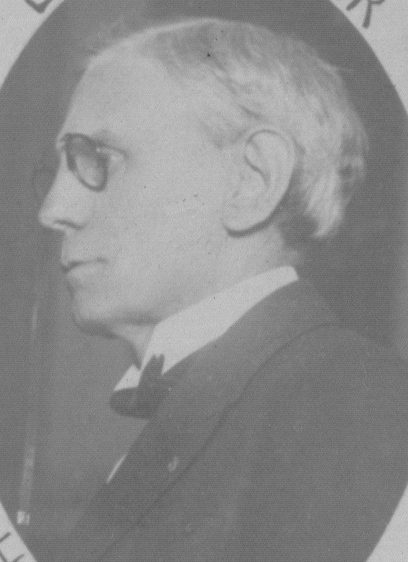

Nominee	William Rock Painter	Hiram Lloyd	James M. Burrus
Party	Democratic	Republican	Progressive
Popular vote	333,679	215,476	113,767
Percentage	47.77%	30.85%	16.29%
Lieutenant Governor before election
Jacob F. Gmelich
Republican
Elected Lieutenant Governor
William Rock Painter
Democratic

The 1912 Missouri lieutenant gubernatorial election was held on November 5, 1912, in order to elect the lieutenant governor of Missouri. Democratic nominee William Rock Painter defeated Republican nominee Hiram Lloyd, Progressive nominee James M. Burrus, Socialist nominee Richard Hatham, Prohibition nominee Julius C. Hughes and Socialist Labor nominee Sidney Johnson.

== General election ==
On election day, November 5, 1912, Democratic nominee William Rock Painter won the election by a margin of 118,203 votes against his foremost opponent Republican nominee Hiram Lloyd, thereby gaining Democratic control over the office of lieutenant governor. Painter was sworn in as the 28th lieutenant governor of Missouri on January 13, 1913.

=== Results ===
Missouri lieutenant gubernatorial election, 1912
Party	Candidate	Votes	%
Democratic	William Rock Painter	333,679	47.77
Republican	Hiram Lloyd	215,476	30.85
Progressive	James M. Burrus	113,767	16.29
Socialist	Richard Hatham	28,384	4.06
Prohibition	Julius C. Hughes	5,292	0.76
Socialist Labor	Sidney Johnson	1,857	0.27
Total votes		698,455	100.00
Democratic gain from Republican			

== See also ==
- 1912 Missouri gubernatorial election
