= Edward Voigt =

American politician

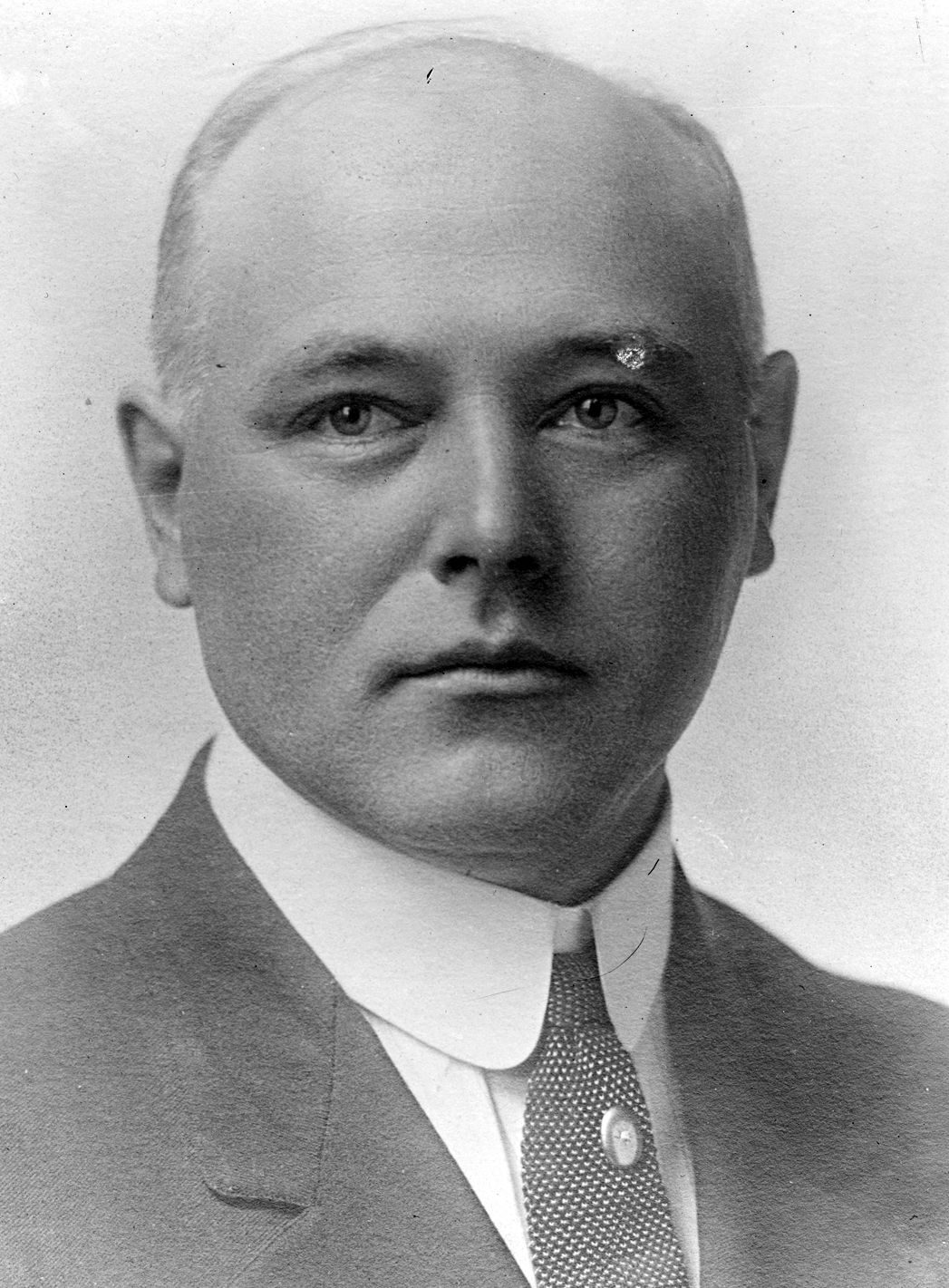

Member of the U.S. House of Representatives from Wisconsin's 2nd district
- In office March 4, 1917 – March 3, 1927
- Preceded by: Michael E. Burke
- Succeeded by: Charles A. Kading

District Attorney of Sheboygan County, Wisconsin
- In office January 1, 1905 – January 1, 1911

Personal details
- Born: December 1, 1873 Bremen, Germany
- Died: August 26, 1934 (aged 60) Elkhart Lake, Wisconsin, U.S.
- Resting place: Forest Home Cemetery, Milwaukee, Wisconsin
- Party: Republican
- Spouse: Harriet "Hattie" Wellhausen

Edward Voigt (December 1, 1873 – August 26, 1934) was a German American immigrant, lawyer, and Republican politician from Sheboygan, Wisconsin. He served five terms in the U.S. House of Representatives, representing Wisconsin's 2nd congressional district from 1917 to 1927. He previously served as city attorney of Sheboygan and district attorney of Sheboygan County.

== Early life ==
Voigt was born in Bremen, Germany. He immigrated to the United States with his parents, who settled in Milwaukee, Wisconsin, in 1883. He was employed in law and insurance offices for several years. He graduated from the law department of the University of Wisconsin–Madison in 1899. He was admitted to the bar the same year and commenced practice in Sheboygan. He served as district attorney of Sheboygan County from 1905 to 1911. He was also the city attorney for Sheboygan from 1913 to 1917.

== Congress ==
Voigt was elected as a Republican to the Sixty-fifth and to the four succeeding Congresses (March 4, 1917 – March 3, 1927) as the representative to Wisconsin's 2nd congressional district. On April 5, 1917, he voted against declaring war on Germany. He was not a candidate for reelection in 1926 to the Seventieth Congress. He served as delegate to the Republican National Convention in 1924.

== Career after Congress ==
He resumed the practice of law in Sheboygan, Wisconsin, after congress. Voigt was elected in 1928 as a judge of the fourth judicial Wisconsin Circuit Court. He served from January 1929 until his death at his summer home at Crystal Lake (in rural Sheboygan County near Elkhart Lake) on August 26, 1934. He was interred in Forest Home Cemetery in Milwaukee, Wisconsin.

U.S. House of Representatives
Preceded by Michael E. Burke	Member of the U.S. House of Representatives from Wisconsin's 2nd congressional district 1917 – 1927	Succeeded by Charles A. Kading
