= 1912 Georgia gubernatorial special election =

- January 10, 1912
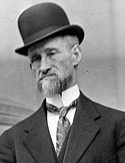
Nominee	Joseph Mackey Brown
Party	Democratic
Popular vote	28,852
Percentage	98.97%
Governor before election
John M. Slaton (Acting)
Democratic
Elected Governor
Joseph Mackey Brown
Democratic

The 1912 Georgia gubernatorial special election was held on January 10, 1912, in order to elect the Governor of Georgia for the remainder of Governor Hoke Smith's term, following his resignation on November 15, 1911, after having been elected to the United States Senate. Democratic nominee and former Governor of Georgia Joseph Mackey Brown defeated Socialist Party candidate A. F. Castleberry. The general election was the last gubernatorial election to have a non-Democrat on the general election ballot until 1936.

== Democratic primary ==
The Democratic primary election was held in December 1911. Former Governor of Georgia Joseph Mackey Brown received a majority of the votes (39.46%), and was thus elected as the nominee for the general election on January 10, 1912.

=== Results ===
Democratic gubernatorial primary
Party	Candidate	Votes	%
Democratic	Joseph Mackey Brown	43,395	39.46%
Democratic	J. Pope Brown	38,024	34.57%
Democratic	Richard Russell Sr.	28,562	25.97%
Total votes		109,981	100.00%

== General election ==
On election day, January 10, 1912, Democratic nominee Joseph Mackey Brown won the election by a margin of 28,552 votes against his opponent Socialist Party candidate A. F. Castleberry, thereby holding Democratic control over the office of Governor. Brown was sworn in on January 25, 1912.

=== Results ===
Georgia gubernatorial special election, 1912
Party	Candidate	Votes	%
Democratic	Joseph Mackey Brown	28,852	98.97
Socialist	A. F. Castleberry	300	1.03
Total votes		29,152	100.00
Democratic hold			

== Bibliography ==
The World Almanac and Encyclopedia, 1913. New York: The Press Publishing Co. (The New York World). 1912.
