= John Strange (Wisconsin politician) =

American politician (1852–1923)

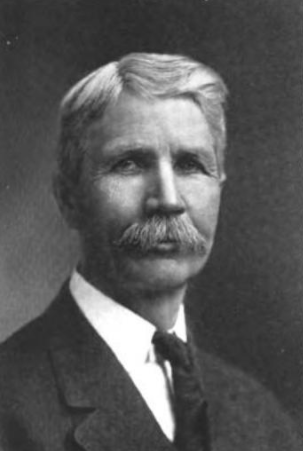

21st Lieutenant Governor of Wisconsin
- In office January 4, 1909 – January 2, 1911
- Governor: James O. Davidson
- Preceded by: William D. Connor
- Succeeded by: Thomas Morris

Personal details
- Born: June 27, 1852 Oakfield, Wisconsin, U.S.
- Died: May 28, 1923 (aged 70) Neenah, Wisconsin, U.S.
- Resting place: Oak Hill Cemetery, Neenah
- Party: Republican
- Spouse: Mary Margaret McGregor Strange
- Children: 4
- Profession: Merchant; Politician

John Strange (June 27, 1852 – May 28, 1923) was an American businessman and Republican politician from Winnebago County, Wisconsin. He was the 21st lieutenant governor of Wisconsin, serving from 1909 to 1911.

== Early life ==
Strange was born in Oakfield, Wisconsin, on June 27, 1852. As a boy, he attended the district schools part of the year and worked in various woodenware factories for part of the year.

== Career ==
After attending Beloit College, Strange was a schoolteacher in Rock County, Wisconsin, and Clinton County, Iowa, until 1871; then he was a grocery clerk in Minneapolis. He worked in powder, flour, and woodware mills and built and sold the first store in Dale, Outagamie County. He also managed a retail lumber yard for two years in Iowa.

In 1899, Strange moved to Neenah, Wisconsin, and established a sawmill in the nearby town of Menasha. He was elected the 21st Lieutenant Governor of Wisconsin in 1908, and served one term, from 1909 until 1911.

After his term ended, Strange carried out a career in business; he was president of the John Strange Paper Company, the John Strange Pail Company and the Stevens Point Pulp and Paper Company, as well as the director of R. McMillan Company.

During World War I, Strange, who was a supporter of Prohibition, gave a speech denouncing Wisconsin's German brewers and linking them to the United States's wartime enemies, saying, "the worst of all our German enemies, the most treacherous, the most menacing, are Pabst, Schlitz, Blatz, and Miller."

== Death ==
Strange died unexpectedly on May 28, 1923, in Neenah, Wisconsin, when he dropped dead while giving a speech at a Rotary dinner. He is interred at Oak Hill Cemetery, Neenah, Wisconsin.

== Family life ==
The son of Thomas and Martha Dixon Strange, he married Mary Margaret McGregor on July 11, 1876, and they had two daughters, Katherine Strange McMillan and Ethel M. Strange McLaughlin; and two sons, Hugh McGregor Strange and John Paul Strange.

Party political offices
Preceded by William D. Connor	Republican nominee for Lieutenant Governor of Wisconsin; 1908	Succeeded by Thomas Morris
Political offices
Preceded by William D. Connor	Lieutenant Governor of Wisconsin; 1909–1911	Succeeded by Thomas Morris
