= Charles L. Hill =

American politician

- Born: Charles Lewis Hill; September 5, 1869; Rosendale, Wisconsin, U.S.
- Died: June 1, 1957 (aged 87); Elkhorn, Wisconsin, U.S.
- Education: University of Wisconsin–Madison
- Occupation: Politician
- Political party: Prohibition

Charles Lewis Hill (September 5, 1869 – June 1, 1957) was an American politician who, during 1910s, received the Prohibition Party nominations for Wisconsin governor and senator.

== Biography ==
Hill was born in Rosendale, Wisconsin. He attended the University of Wisconsin–Madison and became president of the National Dairy Association and served as a delegate to the World's Dairy Congress in 1931. He also authored the book The Guernsey Breed. Hill died in Elkhorn, Wisconsin.

== Political candidacy ==
Hill ran for Governor of Wisconsin in 1912, losing to incumbent Francis E. McGovern. In 1914 and 1916, Hill was a candidate for the United States Senate from Wisconsin, losing to Paul O. Husting in 1914 and to incumbent Robert M. La Follette, Sr. in 1916. Hill was a member of the Prohibition Party.
