= Thomas Morris (Wisconsin politician) =

American politician, 22nd Lieutenant Governor of Wisconsin (1861–1928)

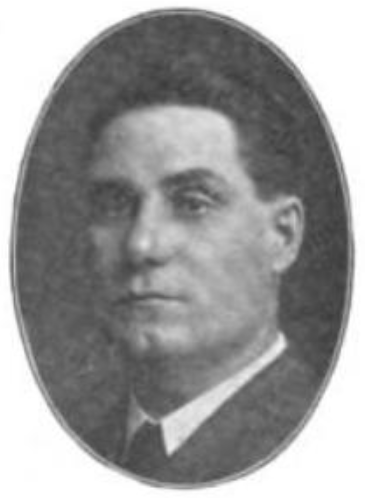

22nd Lieutenant Governor of Wisconsin
- In office January 2, 1911 – January 4, 1915
- Governor: Francis E. McGovern
- Preceded by: John Strange
- Succeeded by: Edward Dithmar

Member of the Wisconsin State Senate
- In office 1904; 1908

Personal details
- Born: December 9, 1861 Saint-Hyacinthe, Canada East
- Died: September 17, 1928 (aged 66) New York City, United States
- Party: Republican
- Spouse: Lillian L. Pendleton
- Education: University of Wisconsin Law School
- Profession: Lawyer; Politician

Thomas Morris (December 9, 1861 – September 17, 1928) was an American lawyer and politician in the U.S. state of Wisconsin. He served in the Wisconsin State Senate and was the 22nd Lieutenant Governor of Wisconsin from 1911 until 1915.

== Early life ==
Morris was born in Saint-Hyacinthe, St. Arnold Parish, Canada East. He attended the common schools in Quebec before moving to La Crosse, Wisconsin, where he worked as a barber. He graduated from the University of Wisconsin Law School in Madison, Wisconsin, in 1889, and returned to La Crosse to practice law.

== Political career ==
In 1898 he was elected District Attorney for La Crosse County, Wisconsin, and was reelected in 1900. He served as the chairman of the Republican Congressional Committee of the Seventh Congressional District before being elected to the Wisconsin State Senate in 1904 and 1908. Morris was instrumental in establishing what is now University of Wisconsin–La Crosse in 1909.

In 1911 Morris was elected Lieutenant Governor of Wisconsin as a Republican serving until 1915.

He died on September 17, 1928, in New York City of a heart attack at the age of 67.

== Family life ==
Morris married Lillian L. Pendleton and had nine children.

Party political offices
| Preceded by John Strange | Republican nominee for Lieutenant Governor of Wisconsin; 1910, 1912 | Succeeded by Edward Dithmar |
Political offices
| Preceded by John Strange | Lieutenant Governor of Wisconsin; 1911–1915 | Succeeded by Edward Dithmar |
