= Francis E. McGovern =

American politician (1866–1946)

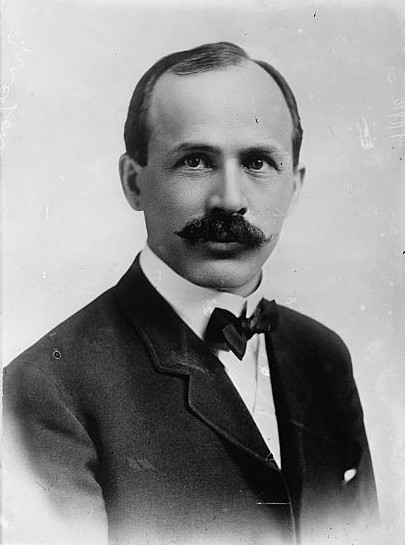
- McGovern in 1910

Chair of the National Governors Association
- In office September 12, 1911 – November 10, 1914
- Preceded by: Augustus E. Willson
- Succeeded by: David I. Walsh

22nd Governor of Wisconsin
- In office January 2, 1911 – January 4, 1915
- Lieutenant: Thomas Morris
- Preceded by: James O. Davidson
- Succeeded by: Emanuel L. Philipp

Personal details
- Born: January 21, 1866 Elkhart Lake, Wisconsin, U.S.
- Died: May 16, 1946 (aged 80) Milwaukee, Wisconsin, U.S.
- Resting place: Forest Home Cemetery
- Party: Republican
- Education: University of Wisconsin (BA)

Francis Edward McGovern (January 21, 1866 – May 16, 1946) was an American lawyer and politician from Wisconsin. He served as the 22nd governor of Wisconsin from 1911 to 1915. In 1911 especially he sponsored a major series of progressive achievements through the legislature.

Through most of his life, he was a member of the Republican Party; he was originally a close ally of Wisconsin U.S. senator Robert M. "Fighting Bob" La Follette—the two progressive leaders held an uneasy truce for McGovern's reelection in 1912 but became bitter rivals afterward. La Follette helped defeat McGovern in his bid for U.S. Senate in 1914, and McGovern then lost the 1916 Republican gubernatorial primary. After those losses, he largely retired from politics. Later in life, McGovern left the Republican Party and became a Democrat.

== Early life ==
McGovern was born in Elkhart Lake, Sheboygan County, Wisconsin. He graduated from the University of Wisconsin in 1890, and served as high school principal in Brodhead, Wisconsin, and Appleton, Wisconsin. He studied law and was admitted to the bar in 1897. He began the practice of law in Milwaukee, Wisconsin.

== Political career ==
He was elected District Attorney in Milwaukee in 1904, and served as District Attorney from 1903 to 1904 and from 1905 to 1908. In 1908, he ran for U.S. Senator but was defeated. He was elected Governor of Wisconsin in 1910 and 1912. McGovern supported the La Follette progressive wing of the Republican Party. He broke with La Follette in 1912 by supporting Theodore Roosevelt for the Republican nomination. LaFollette did support McGovern's reelection in 1912. La Follette worked to defeat him in 1914, in conjunction with anti-tax conservative Republicans, who opposed McGovern's introduction of the state's income tax — the U.S.'s first such tax, now the norm in most states. He ran for U.S. Senator in 1914 and was defeated.

After leaving the governorship, he resumed the practice of law. When World War I began he entered the U.S. Army as a major, and served as Judge Advocate of the 18th Division. In 1920 he served as general counsel for the U.S. Shipping Board. He resumed the practice of law in Milwaukee in 1921 and served as president of the Milwaukee Bar Association in 1923. He was a member of the executive committee of the Wisconsin State Bar Association.

He died on May 16, 1946, in Milwaukee, and is interred in Forest Home Cemetery in Milwaukee.

Party political offices
Preceded by James O. Davidson	Republican nominee for Governor of Wisconsin; 1910, 1912	Succeeded by Emanuel L. Philipp
First	Republican nominee for United States Senator from Wisconsin (Class 3); 1914	Succeeded by Irvine Lenroot
Preceded by Harry W. Bolens	Democratic nominee for Governor of Wisconsin; 1940	Succeeded by William Sullivan
Political offices
Preceded by James O. Davidson	Governor of Wisconsin; 1911–1915	Succeeded by Emanuel L. Philipp
Preceded by Augustus E. Willson	Chair of the National Governors Association; 1911–1914	Succeeded by David I. Walsh
