= List of elections in 1908 =

The following elections occurred in the year 1908.

== Africa ==
- 1908 Southern Rhodesian Legislative Council election

== Australia ==
- 1908 Adelaide by-election
- 1908 Queensland state election
- 1908 Richmond state by-election
- 1908 St George state by-election
- 1908 Sturt state by-election
- 1908 Western Australian state election

== Europe ==
- 1908 Belgian general election
- 1908 Bulgarian parliamentary election
- 1908 Croatian parliamentary election
- 1908 Dalmatian parliamentary election
- 1908 Faroese general election
- 1908 Finnish parliamentary election
- 1908 Icelandic prohibition referendum
- 1908 Luxembourg general election
- 1908 Ottoman general election
- 1908 Portuguese legislative election
- 1908 Serbian parliamentary election
- 1908 Swedish general election
- 1908 Swiss federal election
- 1908 Swiss referendums

=== United Kingdom ===
see also

- 1908 Ashburton by-election
- 1908 Bewdley by-election (Stanley Baldwin followed his father Alfred Baldwin)
- 1908 Chelmsford by-election
- 1908 County Carlow by-election
- 1908 Dewsbury by-election
- 1908 Dundee by-election
- 1908 Hastings by-election
- 1908 Kincardineshire by-election
- 1908 Leeds South by-election
- 1908 Manchester North West by-election
- 1908 Montrose Burghs by-election
- 1908 Newcastle-upon-Tyne by-election
- 1908 North Leitrim by-election
- 1908 Peckham by-election
- 1908 Pembrokeshire by-election
- 1908 Pudsey by-election
- 1908 Sheffield Central by-election
- 1908 St Austell by-election
- 1908 Stirling Burghs by-election
- 1908 West Carmarthenshire by-election
- 1908 West Derbyshire by-election
- 1908 Wolverhampton East by-election

== North America ==
=== Canada ===
- 1908 Canadian federal election
- 1908 Edmonton municipal election
- 1908 New Brunswick general election
- 1908 Newfoundland general election
- 1908 Ontario general election
- 1908 Prince Edward Island general election
- 1908 Saskatchewan general election

=== Caribbean ===
- 1908 Cuban general election
- 1908 Dominican Republic general election

=== United States ===
- 1908 New York state election
- 1908 United States elections
- 1908 United States presidential election

==== United States lieutenant gubernatorial ====
- 1908 Connecticut lieutenant gubernatorial election
- 1908 Illinois lieutenant gubernatorial election
- 1908 Minnesota lieutenant gubernatorial election
- 1908 Missouri lieutenant gubernatorial election
- 1908 Nebraska lieutenant gubernatorial election
- 1908 Texas lieutenant gubernatorial election
- 1908 Wisconsin lieutenant gubernatorial election

==== United States gubernatorial ====
- 1908 Arkansas gubernatorial election
- 1908 Colorado gubernatorial election
- 1908 Connecticut gubernatorial election
- 1908 Delaware gubernatorial election
- 1908 Florida gubernatorial election
- 1908 Georgia gubernatorial election
- 1908 Idaho gubernatorial election
- 1908 Illinois gubernatorial election
- 1908 Indiana gubernatorial election
- 1908 Kansas gubernatorial election
- 1908 Louisiana gubernatorial election
- 1908 Maine gubernatorial election
- 1908 Massachusetts gubernatorial election
- 1908 Michigan gubernatorial election
- 1908 Minnesota gubernatorial election
- 1908 Missouri gubernatorial election
- 1908 Montana gubernatorial election
- 1908 Nebraska gubernatorial election
- 1908 New Hampshire gubernatorial election
- 1908 New York gubernatorial election
- 1908 North Carolina gubernatorial election
- 1908 North Dakota gubernatorial election
- 1908 Ohio gubernatorial election
- 1908 Rhode Island gubernatorial election
- 1908 South Carolina gubernatorial election
- 1908 South Dakota gubernatorial election
- 1908 Tennessee gubernatorial election
- 1908 Texas gubernatorial election
- 1908 United States gubernatorial elections
- 1908 Utah gubernatorial election
- 1908 Vermont gubernatorial election
- 1908 Washington gubernatorial election
- 1908 West Virginia gubernatorial election
- 1908 Wisconsin gubernatorial election

==== United States House of Representatives ====
- 1908 United States House of Representatives elections
- United States House of Representatives elections in California, 1908
- United States House of Representatives elections in Oklahoma, 1908
- United States House of Representatives elections in South Carolina, 1908

==== United States Senate ====
- 1908–09 United States Senate elections

==== United States mayoral elections ====
- 1908 Milwaukee mayoral election
- 1908 Manchester, New Hampshire mayoral election

== Oceania ==
=== Australia ===
- 1908 Adelaide by-election
- 1908 Queensland state election
- 1908 Richmond state by-election
- 1908 St George state by-election
- 1908 Sturt state by-election
- 1908 Western Australian state election

=== New Zealand ===
- 1908 New Zealand general election
- 1908 Tuapeka by-election
