= 1909 United States gubernatorial elections =

← 1908	November 2, 1909	1910 →

3 governorships
	Majority party	Minority party
Party	Republican	Democratic
Seats before	26 (Note: Frank W. Benson (R) succeeded Oregon Governor George Earle Chamberlain (D) who resigned to take a seat in the U.S. Senate in March 1909.) (Note: Adolph O. Eberhart (R) succeeded Minnesota Governor John Albert Johnson (D) who died in office in September 1909.)	19
Seats after	26	19
Seat change	Steady	Steady
Seats up	2	1
Seats won	2	1
	Third party
Party	Silver
Seats before	1
Seats after	1
Seat change	Steady
Seats up	0
Seats won	0
- Democratic gain Democratic hold Republican gain Republican hold

United States gubernatorial elections were held on November 2, 1909, in three states. Virginia holds its gubernatorial elections in odd numbered years, every 4 years, following the United States presidential election year. Massachusetts and Rhode Island at this time held gubernatorial elections every year. They would abandon this practice in 1920 and 1912, respectively.

== Results ==
State	Incumbent	Party	Status	Opposing candidates
Massachusetts	Eben S. Draper	Republican	Re-elected, 48.64%	James H. Vahey (Democratic) 46.61% Dan White (Socialist) 2.59% John A. Nicholls (Prohibition) 1.39% Moritz E. Ruther (Socialist Labor) 0.77%
Rhode Island	Aram J. Pothier	Republican	Re-elected, 57.00%	Olney Arnold (Democratic) 38.92% Willis H. White (Prohibition) 2.22% Frederick W. Hurst (Socialist) 1.45% Richard Holland (Socialist Labor) 0.40%
Virginia	Claude A. Swanson	Democratic	Term-limited, Democratic victory	William Hodges Mann (Democratic) 63.35% William P. Kent (Republican) 36.13% A. H. Dennett (Socialist Labor) 0.51%
