= 1908 United States gubernatorial elections =

- November 3, 1908 (Note: Arkansas, Georgia, Maine, and Vermont held early elections.)

33 governorships
	Majority party	Minority party
Party	Republican	Democratic
Seats before	26	19
Seats after	24	21
Seat change	▼2	▲2
Seats up	19	12
Seats won	21	14
	Third party
Party	Silver
Seats before	1
Seats after	1
Seat change	Steady
Seats up	0
Seats won	0
- Democratic gain Democratic hold Republican gain Republican hold

United States gubernatorial elections were held in 1908, in 33 states, concurrent with the House, Senate elections and presidential election, on November 3, 1908 (except in Arkansas, Georgia, Maine and Vermont, which held early elections).

In Ohio, the gubernatorial election was held in an even-numbered year for the first time, having previously been held in odd-numbered years. The previous election in this state took place in 1905.

== Results ==
State	Incumbent	Party	Status	Opposing candidates
Arkansas (held, 14 September 1908)	Xenophon Overton Pindall	Democratic	Retired, Democratic victory	George W. Donaghey (Democratic) 68.08% John I. Worthington (Republican) 27.66% J. Samuel Jones (Socialist) 4.18% Scattering 0.08%
Colorado	Henry Augustus Buchtel	Republican	Retired, Democratic victory	John F. Shafroth (Democratic) 49.41% Jesse F. McDonald (Republican) 45.16% Henry Clay Darrah (Socialist) 3.03% H. L. Murray (Prohibition) 2.40%
Connecticut	Rollin S. Woodruff	Republican	[data missing]	George L. Lilley (Republican) 51.92% A. Heaton Richardson (Democratic) 43.50% Charles T. Peach (Socialist) 2.56% Matthew E. O'Brien (Prohibition) 1.37% F. C. Albrecht (Independence) 0.33% Charles F. Roberts (Socialist Labor) 0.31% Scattering 0.01%
Delaware	Preston Lea	Republican	[data missing]	Simeon S. Pennewill (Republican) 51.97% Rowland G. Paynter (Democratic) 47.56% Frank Smith (Socialist) 0.47%
Florida	Napoleon B. Broward	Democratic	Term-limited, Democratic victory	Albert W. Gilchrist (Democratic) 78.82% John M. Cheney (Republican) 15.40% A. J. Pettigrew (Socialist) 5.79%
Georgia (held, 7 October 1908)	M. Hoke Smith	Democratic	Defeated in Democratic primary, Democratic victory	Joseph M. Brown (Democratic) 90.53% Yancy Carter (Independent) 9.47% (Democratic primary results); Joseph M. Brown 52.60% M. Hoke Smith 47.40%
Idaho	Frank R. Gooding	Republican	[data missing]	James H. Brady (Republican) 49.61% Moses Alexander (Democratic) 41.61% Ernest Untermann (Socialist) 6.38% William C. Stalker (Prohibition) 2.25% E. W. Johnson (Independence) 0.14% Scattering 0.01%
Illinois	Charles Samuel Deneen	Republican	Re-elected, 47.64%	Adlai Stevenson (Democratic) 45.64% Daniel R. Sheen (Prohibition) 2.94% James H. Brower (Socialist) 2.71% George W. McCaskrin (Independence) 0.94% Gustave A. Jennings (Socialist Labor) 0.13%
Indiana	Frank Hanly	Republican	Term-limited, Democratic victory	Thomas R. Marshall (Democratic) 48.95% James E. Watson (Republican) 46.87% Sumner W. Haynes (Prohibition) 2.24% Frank S. Goodman (Socialist) 1.68% F. J. S. Robinson (Populist) 0.14% O. P. Stoner (Socialist Labor) 0.08% James M. Zion (Independence) 0.05%
Iowa	Albert B. Cummins	Republican	Retired to run for U.S. Senate, Republican victory	Beryl F. Carroll (Republican) 54.60% Fred E. White (Democratic) 41.84% K. W. Brown (Prohibition) 1.94% I. S. McCrillis (Socialist) 1.52% Luman H. Weller (Independence) 0.06% D. C. Cowles (People's) 0.05%
Kansas	Edward W. Hoch	Republican	[data missing]	Walter R. Stubbs (Republican) 52.49% Jeremiah D. Botkin (Democratic) 43.33% George F. Hibner (Socialist) 3.13% Alfred L. Hope (Prohibition) 1.04% John W. Northrop (Independence) 0.02%
Maine (held, 14 September 1908)	William T. Cobb	Republican	[data missing]	Bert M. Fernald (Republican) 51.56% Obadiah Gardner (Democratic) 46.46% James H. Ames (Prohibition) 1.00% Curtis A. Perry (Socialist) 0.99%
Massachusetts	Curtis Guild Jr.	Republican	[data missing]	Eben S. Draper (Republican) 51.59% James H. Vahey (Democratic) 38.00% William N. Osgood (Independence) 5.22% James F. Carey (Socialist) 3.26% Williard O. Wylie (Prohibition) 1.35% Walter J. Hoar (Socialist Labor) 0.58%
Michigan	Fred M. Warner	Republican	Re-elected, 48.39%	Lawton T. Hemans (Democratic) 46.63% John W. Gray (Prohibition) 2.97% Alexander M. Stirton (Socialist) 1.74% Archie McInnis (Socialist Labor) 0.16% Alva W. Nichols (Independence) 0.11%
Minnesota	John Albert Johnson	Democratic	Re-elected, 52.08%	Jacob F. Jacobson (Republican) 43.71% George D. Haggard (Prohibition) 2.09% Beecher Moore (Public Ownership) 1.94% William W. Allen (Independence) 0.18%
Missouri	Joseph W. Folk	Democratic	Term-limited, Republican victory	Herbert S. Hadley (Republican) 49.73% William S. Cowherd (Democratic) 47.51% William L. Garver (Socialist) 2.03% Herman P. Faris (Prohibition) 0.58% William A. Dillon (People's) 0.15%
Montana	Edwin L. Norris	Democratic	Re-elected, 47.34%	Edward Donlan (Republican) 45.16% Harry Hazelton (Socialist) 7.50%
Nebraska	George L. Sheldon	Republican	Defeated, 47.27%	Ashton C. Shallenberger (Democratic) (Note: Shallenberger ran under a fusion ticket between the Democrats and the Populist Party) 49.90% Roy R. Teeter (Prohibition) 1.68% C. H. Harbaugh (Socialist) 1.15%
New Hampshire	Charles M. Floyd	Republican	Retired, Republican victory	Henry B. Quinby (Republican) 50.40% Clarence E. Carr (Democratic) 46.74% Sumner F. Claflin (Socialist) 1.23% Edmund B. Tetley (Prohibition) 1.01% Walter H. Lewis (Independence) 0.58% Scattering 0.05%
New York	Charles Evans Hughes	Republican	Re-elected, 49.08%	Lewis S. Chanler (Democratic) 44.84% Clarence J. Shearn (Independence) 2.64% Joshua Wanhope (Socialist) 2.07% George E. Stockwell (Prohibition) 1.15% Leander A. Armstrong (Socialist Labor) 0.22%
North Carolina	Robert Broadnax Glenn	Democratic	Term-limited, Democratic victory	William W. Kitchin (Democratic) 57.31% J. Elwood Cox (Republican) 42.56% J. A. Transom (Socialist) 0.14%
North Dakota	John Burke	Democratic	Re-elected, 51.06%	C. A. Johnson (Republican) 48.43% L. F. Dow (Independent) 0.51%
Ohio	Andrew L. Harris	Republican	Defeated, 47.47%	Judson Harmon (Democratic) 49.20% Robert Bandlow (Socialist) 2.54% John Kircher (Socialist Labor) 0.68% John B. Martin (Prohibition) 0.07% Andrew F. Otte (Independence) 0.04%
Rhode Island	James H. Higgins	Democratic	Retired, Republican victory	Aram J. Pothier (Republican) 52.61% Olney Arnold (Democratic) 42.72% William H. Johnston (Socialist) 1.80% Louis E. Remington (Prohibition) 1.67% A. E. Mowry (Independence) 0.92% Thomas F. Herrick (Socialist Labor) 0.27%
South Carolina	Martin Frederick Ansel	Democratic	Re-elected, 100.00%	(Democratic primary results); Martin Frederick Ansel 59.89% Coleman Livingston Blease 40.11%
South Dakota	Coe I. Crawford	Republican	Retired to run for U.S. Senate, Republican victory	Robert S. Vessey (Republican) 55.28% Andrew E. Lee (Democratic) 39.39% G. F. Knappen (Prohibition) 3.10% J. C. Knapp (Socialist) 2.23%
Tennessee	Malcolm R. Patterson	Democratic	Re-elected, 53.73%	G. N. Tillman (Republican) 45.70% W.A. Weatherall (Socialist) 0.57%
Texas	Thomas M. Campbell	Democratic	Re-elected, 72.79%	John N. Simpson (Republican) 24.37% J. C. Rhodes (Socialist) 2.69% W. B. Cook (Socialist Labor) 0.08% E. C. Heath (Prohibition) 0.05% Charles L. Martin (Independence) 0.02%
Utah	John Christopher Cutler	Republican	[data missing]	William Spry (Republican) 47.45% Jesse Knight (Democratic) 38.80% John A. Street (American) 10.23% V. R. Bohman (Socialist) 3.53%
Vermont (held, 1 September 1908)	Fletcher D. Proctor	Republican	Retired, Republican victory	George Herbert Prouty (Republican) 70.83% James M. Burke (Democratic) 24.78% Quimby S. Backus (Independent) 2.10% Eugene M. Campbell (Prohibition) 1.43% Joseph H. Dunbar (Socialist) 0.85% Scattering 0.02%
Washington	Albert E. Mead	Republican	Defeated in Republican primary, Republican victory	Samuel Goodlove Cosgrove (Republican) 62.38% John Pattison (Democratic) 32.91% George Ellsworth Boomer (Socialist) 2.72% Arthur S. Caton (Prohibition) 1.99%
West Virginia	William M. O. Dawson	Republican	Term-limited, Republican victory	William Ellsworth Glasscock (Republican) 50.70% Louis Bennett (Democratic) 46.09% E. W. Miller (Independent) 1.93% I. W. Houston (Socialist) 1.28%
Wisconsin	James O. Davidson	Republican	Re-elected, 54.03%	John A. Aylward (Democratic) 36.91% H. D. Brown (Social Democrat) 6.36% Winfield D. Cox (Prohibition) 2.62% Herman Bottema (Socialist Labor) 0.09%

== See also ==
- 1908 United States elections
  - 1908 United States presidential election
  - 1908–09 United States Senate elections
  - 1908 United States House of Representatives elections
