= 1910 United States gubernatorial elections =

- November 8, 1910 (Note: Arkansas, Georgia, Maine, and Vermont held early elections.)

31 governorships
	Majority party	Minority party
Party	Democratic	Republican
Seats before	19	26
Seats after	25	21
Seat change	▲6	▼5
Seats up	11	19
Seats won	17	14
	Third party
Party	Silver
Seats before	1
Seats after	0
Seat change	▼1
Seats up	1
Seats won	0
- Democratic gain Democratic hold Republican gain Republican hold

United States gubernatorial elections were held 31 states, concurrent with the House and Senate elections, on November 8, 1910 (except in Arkansas, Georgia, Maine and Vermont, which held early elections).

In Oregon, the gubernatorial election was held on the same day as federal elections for the first time, having previously been held in June.

== Results ==
State	Incumbent	Party	Status	Opposing candidates
Alabama	B. B. Comer	Democratic	Term-limited, Democratic victory	Emmet O'Neal (Democratic) 80.18% Joseph O. Thompson (Republican) 19.82%
Arkansas (held, September 12, 1910)	George W. Donaghey	Democratic	Re-elected, 67.44%	Andrew I. Roland (Republican) 26.46% Dan Hogan (Socialist) 6.10%
California	James Gillett	Republican	Retired, Republican victory	Hiram W. Johnson (Republican) 45.94% Theodore Arlington Bell (Democratic) 40.14% J. Stitt Wilson (Socialist) 12.40% Simeon P. Meads (Prohibition) 1.51% Scattering 0.02%
Colorado	John F. Shafroth	Democratic	Re-elected, 51.04%	John B. Stephen (Republican) 43.48% Henry W. Pinkham (Socialist) 3.49% Phideliah A. Rice (Prohibition) 1.67% George Anderson (Socialist Labor) 0.33%
Connecticut	Frank B. Weeks	Republican	[data missing]	Simeon E. Baldwin (Democratic) 46.48% Charles A. Goodwin (Republican) 44.25% Robert Hunter (Socialist) 7.33% Emil L. G. Hohenthal (Prohibition) 1.22% Frederick Fellerman (Socialist Labor) 0.73%
Georgia (held, October 5, 1910)	Joseph M. Brown	Democratic	Defeated in Democratic primary, ran as an independent, defeated	M. Hoke Smith (Democratic) 82.48% Joseph M. Brown (Independent Democrat) 17.44% C. O. Brown (Socialist) 0.08% (Democratic primary results); M. Hoke Smith 51.10% Joseph M. Brown 48.90%
Idaho	James H. Brady	Republican	Defeated, 46.38%	James H. Hawley (Democratic) 47.42% S. W. Motley (Socialist) 6.20%
Iowa	Beryl F. Carroll	Republican	Re-elected, 49.81%	Claude R. Porter (Democratic) 45.37% A. MacEachron (Prohibition) 2.48% John M. Work (Socialist) 2.35%
Kansas	Walter R. Stubbs	Republican	Re-elected, 49.76%	George H. Hodges (Democratic) 44.80% S. M. Stallard (Socialist) 4.72% William C. Cady (Prohibition) 0.73%
Maine (held, September 12, 1910)	Bert M. Fernald	Republican	Defeated, 45.86%	Frederick W. Plaisted (Democratic) 52.01% Robert V. Hunter (Socialist) 1.16% James H. Ames (Prohibition) 0.92% Scattering 0.05%
Massachusetts	Eben S. Draper	Republican	Defeated, 44.05%	Eugene Foss (Democratic) 52.03% Dan White (Socialist) 2.59% John A. Nicholls (Prohibition) 0.74% Moritz E. Ruther (Socialist Labor) 0.59% Scattering 0.01%
Michigan	Fred M. Warner	Republican	Retired, Republican victory	Chase S. Osborn (Republican) 52.85% Lawton T. Hemans (Democratic) 41.63% Joseph Warnock (Socialist) 2.60% Fred W. Corbett (Prohibition) 2.60% Herman Richter (Socialist Labor) 0.31%
Minnesota	Adolph O. Eberhart	Republican	Re-elected, 55.73%	James Gray Sr. (Democratic) 35.23% George E. Barrett (Public Ownership) 3.79% Jergen F. Heiberg (Prohibition) 3.04% Carl W. Brandborg (Socialist Labor) 2.21%
Nebraska	Ashton C. Shallenberger	Democratic	Defeated in Democratic primary, Republican victory	Chester H. Aldrich (Republican) 51.90% James C. Dahlman (Democratic) 45.45% Clyde J. Wright (Socialist) 2.65%
Nevada	Denver S. Dickerson	Silver-Democrat	Ran as a Democrat, defeated	Tasker L. Oddie (Republican) 50.59% Denver S. Dickerson (Democratic) 42.66% Henry F. Gegax (Socialist) 6.75%
New Hampshire	Henry B. Quinby	Republican	Retired, Republican victory	Robert P. Bass (Republican) 53.36% Clarence E. Carr (Democratic) 44.84% Ash Warren Drew (Socialist) 1.31% John C. Berry (Prohibition) 0.49% Scattering 0.01%
New Jersey	John Franklin Fort	Republican	Term-limited, Democratic victory	Woodrow Wilson (Democratic) 53.93% Vivian M. Lewis (Republican) 42.61% Wilson B. Killingbeck (Socialist) 2.34% C. F. Repp (Prohibition) 0.65% John C. Butterworth (Socialist Labor) 0.47%
New York	Horace White	Republican	Retired, Democratic victory	John Alden Dix (Democratic) 48.00% Henry Lewis Stimson (Republican) 43.31% Charles Edward Russell (Socialist) 3.38% John J. Hopper (Independence League) 3.37% T. Alexander MacNicholl (Prohibition) 1.55% Frank E. Passanno (Socialist Labor) 0.40%
North Dakota	John Burke	Democratic	Re-elected, 49.96%	C. A. Johnson (Republican) 47.36% I. S. Lampman (Socialist) 2.68%
Ohio	Judson Harmon	Democratic	Re-elected, 51.61%	Warren G. Harding (Republican) 40.75% Tom Clifford (Socialist) 6.56% Henry A. Thompson (Prohibition) 0.77% J. R. Malley (Socialist Labor) 0.32%
Oklahoma	Charles N. Haskell	Democratic	Term-limited, Democratic victory	Lee Cruce (Democratic) 48.56% J. W. McNeal (Republican) 40.23% J. T. Cumbie (Socialist) 9.91% George E. Rouch (Prohibition) 1.30%
Oregon	Jay Bowerman	Republican	Defeated, 41.42%	Oswald West (Democratic) 46.61% W. S. Richards (Socialist) 6.83% A. E. Eaton (Prohibition) 5.14%
Pennsylvania	Edwin Sydney Stuart	Republican	Term-limited, Republican victory	John Kinley Tener (Republican) 41.63% William H. Berry (Keystone Party) 38.27% Webster Grim (Democratic) 12.96% John W. Slayton (Socialist) 5.31% Madison F. Larkin (Prohibition) 1.75% George G. Anton (Industrialist) 0.08%
Rhode Island	Aram J. Pothier	Republican	Re-elected, 49.60%	Lewis A. Waterman (Democratic) 47.91% Nathaniel C. Greene (Prohibition) 1.48% Thomas F. Herrick (Socialist Labor) 1.01%
South Carolina	Martin Frederick Ansel	Democratic	[data missing]	Coleman Livingston Blease (Democratic) 99.77% F. N. U. Thompson (Socialist) 0.23% Democratic primary run-off results Coleman Livingston Blease 52.64% Claudius Cyprian Featherstone 47.36%
South Dakota	Robert S. Vessey	Republican	Re-elected, 58.35%	Chauncey L. Wood (Democratic) 35.90% O. W. Butterfield (Prohibition) 4.26% M. G. Opsahl (Independent) 1.49%
Tennessee	Malcolm R. Patterson	Democratic	Retired, Republican victory	Ben W. Hooper (Republican) 51.89% Robert L. Taylor (Democratic) 47.45% Seth McCallen (Socialist) 0.67%
Texas	Thomas Mitchell Campbell	Democratic	Retired, Democratic victory	Oscar Branch Colquitt (Democratic) 79.79% J. O. Terrell (Republican) 11.97% Reddin Andrews Jr. (Socialist) 5.27% Andrew Jackson Houston (Prohibition) 2.77% Carl Schmidt (Socialist Labor) 0.20%
Vermont (held, September 6, 1910)	George H. Prouty	Republican	Retired, Republican victory	John Abner Mead (Republican) 64.20% Charles D. Watson (Democratic) 31.72% Chester E. Ordway (Socialist) 1.92% Edwin R. Towle (Prohibition) 1.90% Scattering 0.26%
Wisconsin	James O. Davidson	Republican	[data missing]	Francis E. McGovern (Republican) 50.58% Adolph H. Schmitz (Democratic) 34.57% William A. Jacobs (Social Democrat) 12.38% Byron E. Van Keuren (Prohibition) 2.33% Fred G. Kremer (Socialist Labor) 0.14% Scattering 0.01%
Wyoming	Bryant B. Brooks	Republican	[data missing]	Joseph M. Carey (Democratic) 55.60% W. E. Mullen (Republican) 40.17% W. W. Paterson (Socialist) 4.23%

== See also ==
- 1910 United States elections
  - 1910–11 United States Senate elections
  - 1910 United States House of Representatives elections

== Bibliography ==
- Grantham, Dewey W. (1958). Hoke Smith and the Politics of the New South. Baton Rouge: Louisiana State University Press. ISBN 978-0-8071-0118-6.
