= List of elections in 1909 =

The following elections occurred in the year 1909.

== Asia ==
- 1909 Chinese parliamentary election
- 1909 Hong Kong sanitary board election
- 1909 Persian legislative election
- 1909 Philippine Assembly elections

== Europe ==
- 1909 Danish Folketing election
- 1909 Danish local elections
- 1909 Dutch general election
- 1909 Finnish parliamentary election
- 1909 Italian general election
- 1909 Liechtenstein local elections
- 1909 Norwegian parliamentary election
- 1909 San Marino general election
- 1909 United Kingdom local elections

== North America ==
=== Canada ===
- 1909 Alberta general election
- 1909 British Columbia general election
- 1909 Edmonton municipal election
- 1909 Newfoundland general election
- 1909 Toronto municipal election
- 1909 Yukon general election

=== United States ===
- 1909 New York state election

==== United States gubernatorial ====
- 1909 Massachusetts gubernatorial election
- 1909 Rhode Island gubernatorial election
- 1909 United States gubernatorial elections
- 1909 Virginia gubernatorial election

==== United States House of Representatives ====
- 1909 United States House of Representatives elections

==== United States Senate ====
- 1908–09 United States Senate elections
- 1909–10 United States Senate elections
- 1909 United States Senate election in California
- United States Senate election in New York, 1909

==== United States mayoral elections ====
- 1909 Los Angeles mayoral election
- 1909 Los Angeles mayoral special election
- 1909 New York City mayoral election
- 1909 Pittsburgh mayoral election
- 1909 San Diego mayoral election
- 1909 San Francisco mayoral election

== Oceania ==
=== Australia ===
- 1909 Brighton state by-election
- 1909 Bulloo state by-election
- 1909 Moreton state by-election
- 1909 Queensland state election
- 1909 Wakefield by-election
- 1909 Tasmanian state election

=== New Zealand ===
- 1909 Rangitikei by-election
- 1909 Thames by-election
