= 1910 United States elections =

- ← 1908 1909 1910 1911 1912 → Midterm elections
- Election day: November 8
- Incumbent president: ▌William Howard Taft (R)
- Next Congress: 62nd

Senate elections
- Overall control: Republican hold
- Seats contested: 30 of 92 seats
- Net seat change: Democratic +9
- Results of the elections: Democratic gain Democratic hold Republican gain Republican hold

House elections
- Overall control: Democratic gain
- Seats contested: All 394 voting seats
- Net seat change: Democratic +55
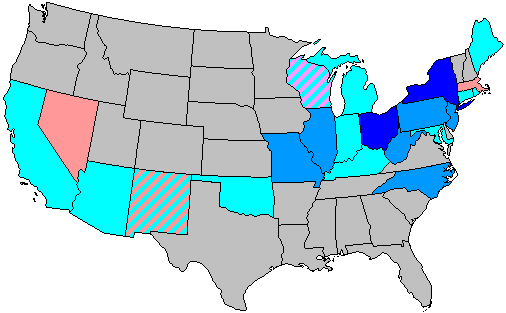
- 1910 House of Representatives election net gains by state 6+ Democratic gain 3-5 Democratic gain 1 to 2 Democratic gain 1 to 2 Republican gain

Gubernatorial elections
- Seats contested: 31
- Net seat change: Democratic +6
- 1910 gubernatorial election results Democratic gain Democratic hold Republican gain Republican hold

Elections were held for the 62nd United States Congress, occurring during the Fourth Party System. The election was held in the middle of Republican President William Howard Taft's term. The Socialist Party won election to Congress for the first time. Arizona and New Mexico were admitted as states during the 62nd Congress.

The Democrats won massive gains in the House, taking control of a chamber of Congress for the first time since the 1894 elections.

In the Senate, Democrats won major gains, but Republicans continued to control the chamber.

The election was a major victory for progressives in both parties. Taft had alienated many progressives in his own party, and allies of Taft lost several nomination battles. The strengthening of progressive Republicans helped lead to Theodore Roosevelt's third party run in 1912. Meanwhile, Woodrow Wilson's landslide gubernatorial election victory in New Jersey helped position him as a major candidate for the 1912 Democratic nomination. The progressive victory led to the passage of the Seventeenth Amendment and the establishment of the Department of Labor during the 62nd Congress.

== See also ==
- 1910 United States House of Representatives elections
- 1910–11 United States Senate elections
- 1910 United States gubernatorial elections
