= L'Église du Précieux Sang =

Historic church in Rhode Island, United States

- U.S. National Register of Historic Places
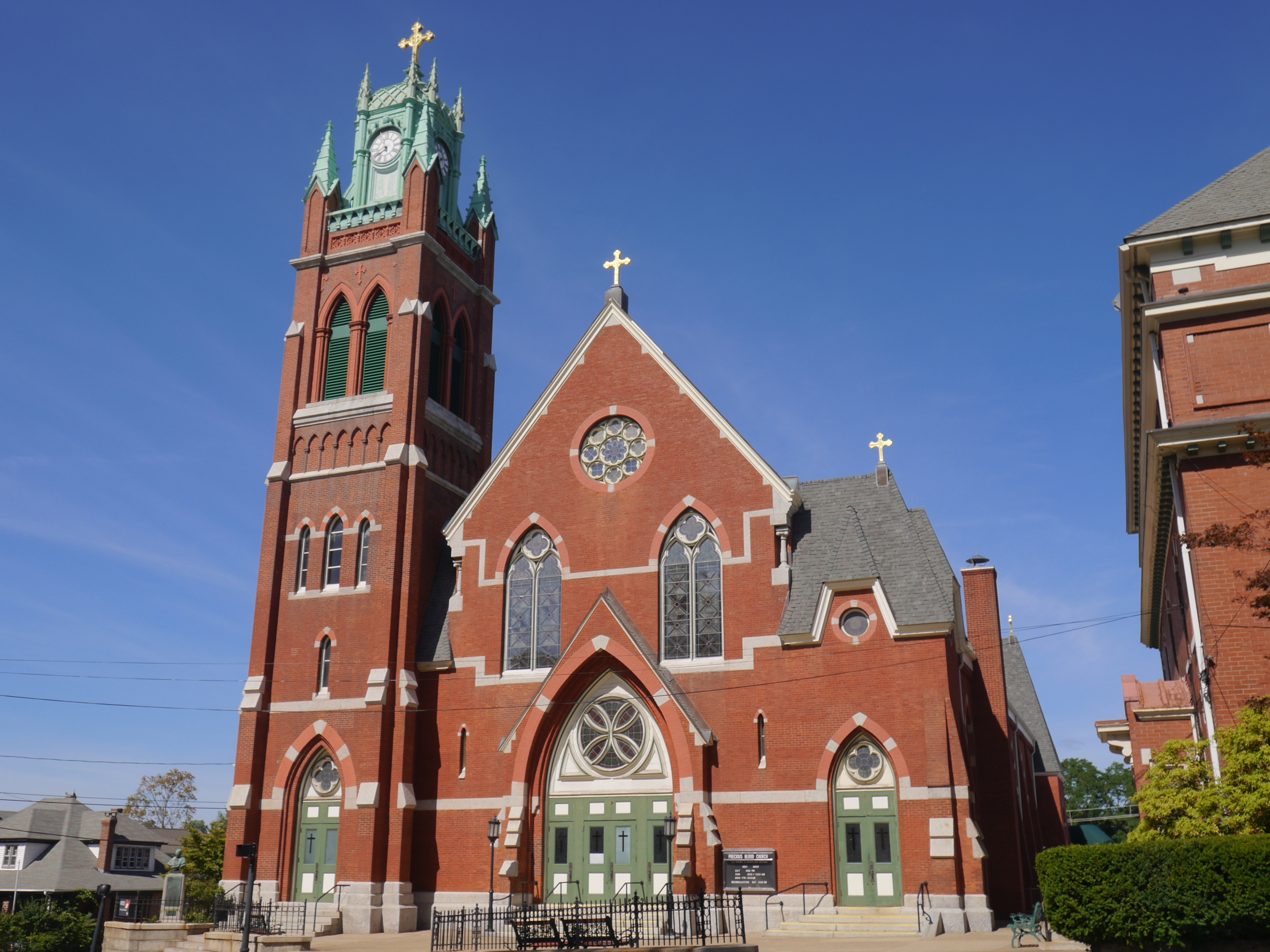

- Location within Rhode Island Location within the United States
- Location: Woonsocket, Rhode Island
- Coordinates: 42°00′07″N 71°30′29″W
- Built: 1873
- Architect: E. Boyden & Son; Walter F. Fontaine
- Architectural style: Gothic
- NRHP reference No.: 82000142
- Added to NRHP: July 26, 1982

L'Église du Précieux Sang (also known as The Church of the Precious Blood (in French) is a historic Roman Catholic church complex at 94 Carrington Avenue and 61 Park Avenue in Woonsocket, Rhode Island, within the Diocese of Providence.

== Description ==
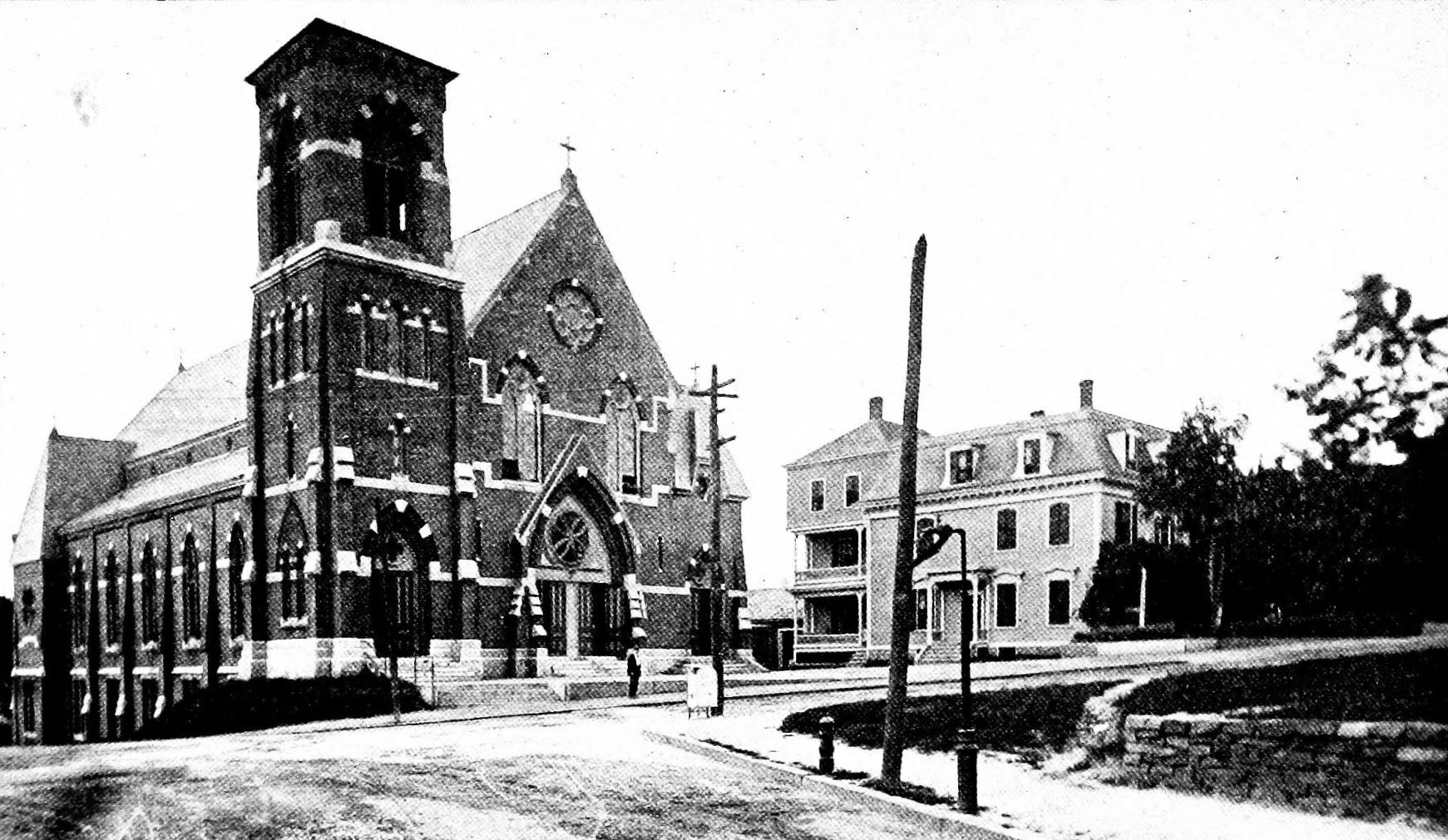
The church and rectory circa 1903, showing the original design.

94 Carrington Avenue

The church, a High Victorian Gothic polychrome (but predominantly red) brick structure, was designed by the Worcester, Massachusetts architects E. Boyden & Son. Construction began in 1873 and halted in 1875. It quickly resumed under a new pastor, but much of the building was destroyed in a severe storm in 1876. Rebuilding began soon after, and the building was finally dedicated in 1881. A rectory was built along with the church. Originally a Second Empire style wooden building, it was remodeled in brick to designs by local architect Walter F. Fontaine in 1917.

The church tower was originally only completed up to the third stage, and it remained so until around 1910, when it was completed to designs by Fontaine.

61 Park Avenue

In 1894–95, a convent and school, the Jesus-Marie Convent and Academy, was built at the corner of Park and Carrington. The architect is unknown, but the building is similar to other late designs by Boyden. The school was tripled in size in 1911. In 1927, a large chapel addition was built onto the convent, designed by Fontaine. At the same time, he designed a high school for the church on Greene Street. The site is now a parking lot. The complex had since been sold, and is now a senior housing development called Chateau Clare.

The church complex was added to the National Register of Historic Places in 1982.

== Notable interments ==
- Aram J. Pothier, Governor of Rhode Island

== See also ==
- Catholic Church in the United States
- Catholic parish church
- Index of Catholic Church articles
- National Register of Historic Places listings in Providence County, Rhode Island
- Pastoral care
