= Pothier House =

Historic house in Rhode Island, United States

- U.S. National Register of Historic Places
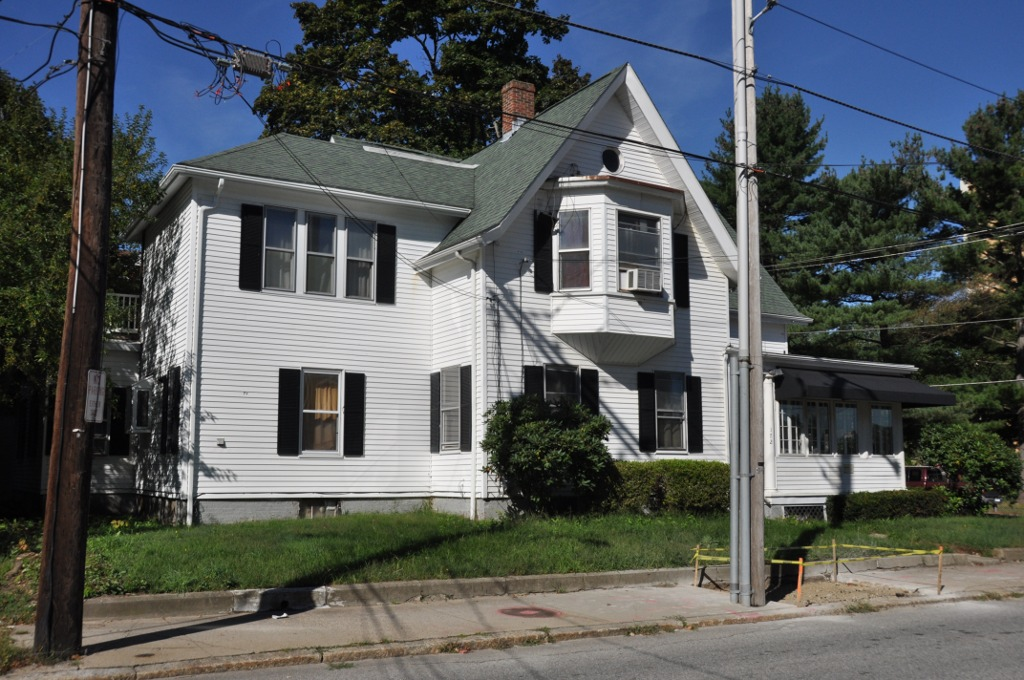

- Location within Rhode Island Location within the United States
- Location: 172 Pond Street, Woonsocket, Rhode Island
- Coordinates: 42°0′27″N 71°30′42″W
- Built: 1881
- Architectural style: Late Victorian
- MPS: Woonsocket MRA
- NRHP reference No.: 82000003
- Added to NRHP: November 24, 1982

The Pothier House is a historic house in Woonsocket, Rhode Island. This modest L-shaped 1 1/2-story cottage is notable as the longtime home of Woonsocket Mayor (and later Governor of Rhode Island) Aram J. Pothier. Pothier's father purchased the house c. 1881, and it was the younger Pothier's home until his death (while serving as governor) in 1928.

The house was listed on the National Register of Historic Places in 1982.

== See also ==
- Aram J. Pothier
- National Register of Historic Places listings in Providence County, Rhode Island
