= 1911 Rhode Island gubernatorial election =

- November 7, 1911
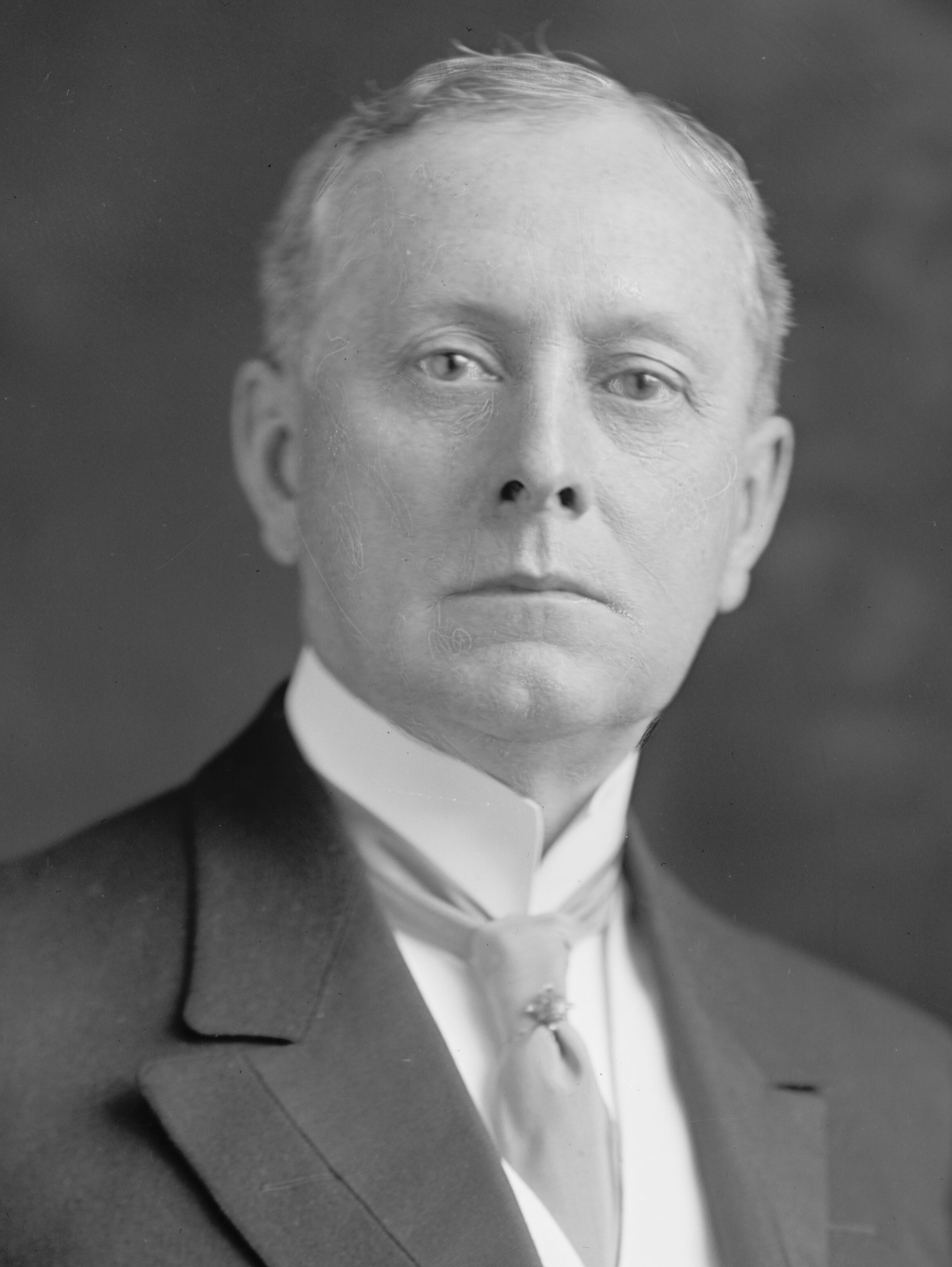

Nominee	Aram J. Pothier	Lewis A. Waterman
Party	Republican	Democratic
Popular vote	37,969	30,575
Percentage	53.36%	42.97%
- Pothier: 50–60% 60–70% 70–80% >90% Waterman: 40–50% 50–60% 60–70%
Governor before election
Aram J. Pothier
Republican
Elected Governor
Aram J. Pothier
Republican

The 1911 Rhode Island gubernatorial election was held on November 7, 1911. Incumbent Republican Aram J. Pothier defeated Democratic nominee Lewis A. Waterman with 53.36% of the vote.

== General election ==
=== Candidates ===
Major party candidates

- Aram J. Pothier, Republican
- Lewis A. Waterman, Democratic

Other candidates

- Edward W. Theinert, Socialist
- Ernest L. Merry, Prohibition
- John W. Leach, Socialist Labor

=== Results ===
1911 Rhode Island gubernatorial election
Party	Candidate	Votes	%	±%
Republican	Aram J. Pothier (incumbent)	37,969	53.36%	
Democratic	Lewis A. Waterman	30,575	42.97%	
Socialist	Edward W. Theinert	1,392	1.96%	
Prohibition	Ernest L. Merry	912	1.28%	
Socialist Labor	John W. Leach	307	0.43%	
Majority		7,394		
Turnout				
Republican hold		Swing		
