= 1908 United States elections =

- ← 1906 1907 1908 1909 1910 → Presidential election year
- Election day: November 3
- Incumbent president: ▌Theodore Roosevelt (R)
- Next Congress: 61st

Presidential election
- Partisan control: Republican hold
- Popular vote margin: Republican +8.6%
- Electoral vote
- William Howard Taft (R): 321
- William Jennings Bryan (D): 162
- 1908 presidential election results. Red denotes states won by Taft, blue denotes states won by Bryan. Numbers indicate the electoral votes won by each candidate.

Senate elections
- Overall control: Republican hold
- Seats contested: 31 of 92 seats
- Net seat change: Democratic +1
- Results of the elections: Democratic gain Democratic hold Republican gain Republican hold

House elections
- Overall control: Republican hold
- Seats contested: All 391 voting members
- Net seat change: Democratic +5

Gubernatorial elections
- Seats contested: 33
- Net seat change: Democratic +2
- 1908 gubernatorial election results Democratic gain Democratic hold Republican gain Republican hold

Elections were held for the 61st United States Congress, occurring during the Fourth Party System. Oklahoma joined the union during the 61st Congress. Despite the Panic of 1907, the Republicans continued to control the presidency and both houses of Congress.

In the presidential election, the Republican former Secretary of War William Howard Taft defeated the Democratic former Representative William Jennings Bryan of Nebraska. Taft and Bryan won both of their respective parties' nominations on the first ballot. Taft easily won the election, taking most states outside the Southern United States. Bryan's loss made him the only presidential nominee of a major party to lose three general elections.

The Democrats made minor gains in the House, but the Republicans maintained a solid majority in the chamber.

In the Senate, Democrats picked up one seat, but Republicans continued to hold a commanding majority.

== See also ==
- 1908 United States presidential election
- 1908 United States House of Representatives elections
- 1908–09 United States Senate elections
- 1908 United States gubernatorial elections
