= 1908 Missouri lieutenant gubernatorial election =

- November 3, 1908
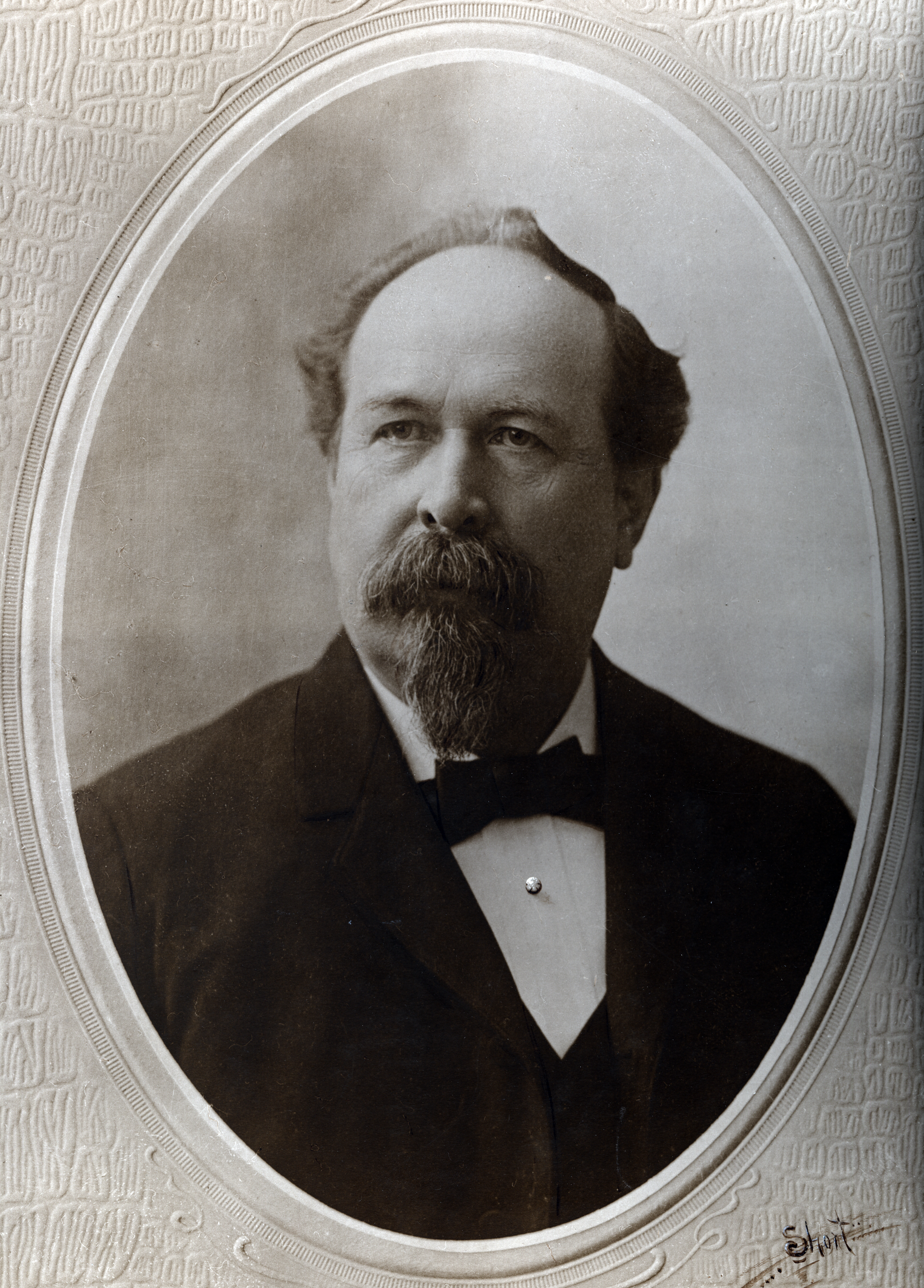

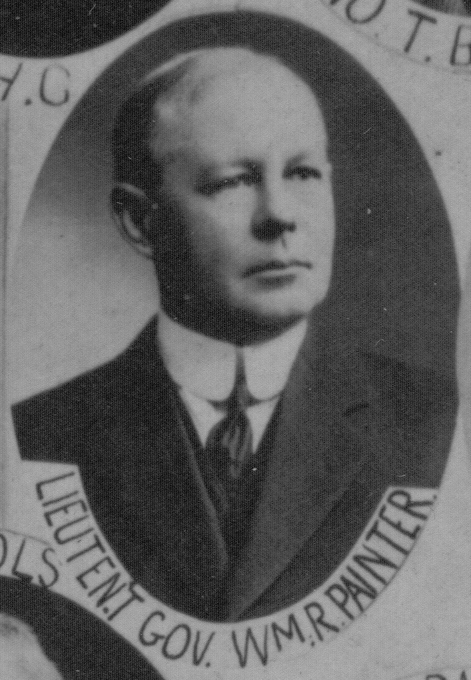
Nominee	Jacob F. Gmelich	William Rock Painter
Party	Republican	Democratic
Popular vote	346,542	346,365
Percentage	50.01%	49.99%
Lieutenant Governor before election
John C. McKinley
Republican
Elected Lieutenant Governor
Jacob F. Gmelich
Republican

The 1908 Missouri lieutenant gubernatorial election was held on November 3, 1908, in order to elect the lieutenant governor of Missouri. Republican nominee and incumbent State Treasurer of Missouri Jacob F. Gmelich defeated Democratic nominee William Rock Painter.

== General election ==
On election day, November 3, 1908, Republican nominee Jacob F. Gmelich won the election by a margin of 177 votes against his opponent Democratic nominee William Rock Painter, thereby retaining Republican control over the office of lieutenant governor. Gmelich was sworn in as the 27th lieutenant governor of Missouri on January 11, 1909.

=== Results ===
Missouri lieutenant gubernatorial election, 1908
Party	Candidate	Votes	%
Republican	Jacob F. Gmelich	346,542	50.01
Democratic	William Rock Painter	346,365	49.99
Total votes		692,907	100.00
Republican hold			

== See also ==
- 1908 Missouri gubernatorial election
