= 1908 Wisconsin lieutenant gubernatorial election =

- November 3, 1908
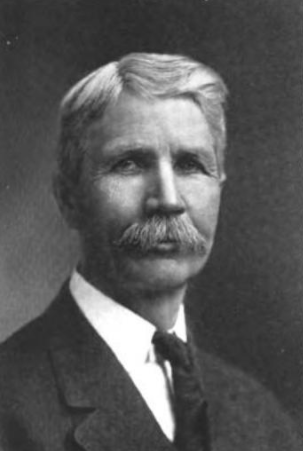

| Nominee | John Strange | Burt Williams | Chester M. Wright |
| Party | Republican | Democratic | Social Democratic |
| Popular vote | 243,443 | 159,993 | 28,460 |
| Percentage | 54.90% | 36.08% | 6.42% |
Lieutenant Governor before election
William D. Connor
Republican
Elected Lieutenant Governor
John Strange
Republican

The 1908 Wisconsin lieutenant gubernatorial election was held on November 3, 1908, in order to elect the lieutenant governor of Wisconsin. Republican nominee John Strange defeated Democratic nominee Burt Williams, Social Democratic nominee Chester M. Wright and Prohibition nominee Charles H. Forward.

== Republican primary ==
The Republican primary election was held on September 1, 1908. Candidate John Strange received a majority of the votes (52.95%) against candidate James F. Trottman, and was thus elected as the nominee for the general election.

=== Results ===
1908 Republican lieutenant gubernatorial primary
| Party | Candidate | Votes | % |
|---|---|---|---|
| Republican | John Strange | 80,933 | 52.95% |
| Republican | James F. Trottman | 71,758 | 46.94% |
| | Scattering | 180 | 0.11% |
| Total votes | | 152,871 | 100.00% |

== General election ==
On election day, November 3, 1908, Republican nominee John Strange won the election by a margin of 83,450 votes against his foremost opponent Democratic nominee Burt Williams, thereby retaining Republican control over the office of lieutenant governor. Strange was sworn in as the 21st lieutenant governor of Wisconsin on January 4, 1909.

=== Results ===
Wisconsin lieutenant gubernatorial election, 1908
| Party | Candidate | Votes | % |
|---|---|---|---|
| Republican | John Strange | 243,443 | 54.90 |
| Democratic | Burt Williams | 159,993 | 36.08 |
| Social Democratic | Chester M. Wright | 28,460 | 6.42 |
| Prohibition | Charles H. Forward | 11,148 | 2.51 |
| | Scattering | 381 | 0.09 |
| Total votes | | 443,425 | 100.00 |
| Republican hold | | | |
