= 1908 Dominican Republic general election =

General elections were held in the Dominican Republic in 1908. Ramón Cáceres was elected president by an electoral college.

== Results ==
=== President ===
Candidate	Votes	%
Ramón Cáceres	578	96.33
Horacio Vásquez	13	2.17
Juan Isidro Jimenes Pereyra	3	0.50
Federico Velásquez	2	0.33
Francisco Henríquez y Carvajal	3	0.50
Augusto Lluberes	1	0.17
Total	600	100.00
Total votes	600	–
Registered voters/turnout	626	95.85
Source: Campillo Pérez
