= 1908 Swiss referendums =

Three referendums were held in Switzerland during 1908. The first two were held on 5 July on amending the federal trade law and on banning absinthe. Both were approved by a majority of voters and cantons. The third was held on 25 October on adding article 24bis to the constitution, concerning hydroelectricity and electricity. It was also approved by a majority of voters and cantons.

== Background ==
The referendum on banning Absinthe was a popular initiative, whilst the referendums on the trade law and amending the constitution were mandatory referendums. Both types required a double majority; a majority of the popular vote and majority of the cantons. The decision of each canton was based on the vote in that canton. Full cantons counted as one vote, whilst half cantons counted as half.

== Results ==
=== Trade law amendment ===
Choice	Popular vote		Cantons		
Choice	Votes	%	Full	Half	Total
For	232,457	71.5	19	5	21.5
Against	92,561	28.5	0	1	0.5
Blank votes	67,405	–	–	–	–
Invalid votes	1,849	–	–	–	–
Total	394,272	100	19	6	22
Registered voters/turnout	809,545	48.7	–	–	–
Source: Nohlen & Stöver

=== Absinthe ban ===
Choice	Popular vote		Cantons		
Choice	Votes	%	Full	Half	Total
For	241,078	63.5	17	6	20
Against	138,669	36.5	2	0	2
Blank votes	15,451	–	–	–	–
Invalid votes	4,019	–	–	–	–
Total	399,217	100	19	6	22
Registered voters/turnout	809,545	49.3	–	–	–
Source: Nohlen & Stöver

=== Adding article 24bis to the constitution ===
Choice	Popular vote		Cantons		
Choice	Votes	%	Full	Half	Total
For	304,923	84.4	19	5	21.5
Against	56,237	15.6	0	1	0.5
Blank votes	14,360	–	–	–	–
Invalid votes	15,314	–	–	–	–
Total	390,834	100	19	6	22
Registered voters/turnout	809,406	48.3	–	–	–
Source: Nohlen & Stöver
