= J. Elwood Cox =

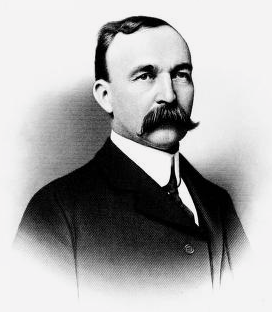
J. Elwood Cox c. 1906

Jonathan Elwood Cox (November 1, 1856 — March 29, 1932) was an American businessman and politician.

== Early life ==
Jonathan Elwood Cox was born on November 1, 1856 in Rich Square, North Carolina. Two years later his father was hired as superintendent of New Garden Boarding School in Guilford County and moved the family there. Cox was educated at New Garden, a business school in Baltimore, and at Earlham College. On October 23, 1878, he married Bertha Snow, with whom he would have one daughter.

== Business career ==
In 1876, Cox took up work as a traveling salesman. In 1880, he moved to High Point and assumed control over his father-in-law's lumber products business, building a factory to produce shuttle blocks and bobbin pins for textile mills.

In 1891, Cox founded Commercial National Bank in High Point. He was elected as the bank's first president and served in that capacity for 14 years. In 1894 Cox joined the Guilford College Board of Trustees. He became chairman of the board in 1903 held the post until his death.

== Political career ==
As his career in business grew more successful, Cox became increasingly involved in the Guilford County Republican Party. The State Republican Convention unanimously nominated him to be its candidate in the 1908 North Carolina gubernatorial election as part of a strategy to win the support of the state's growing industrialist element. Cox was not interested in running but accepted, telling a business associate, "[N]ot that I expect to be elected, or want to be elected as to that matter, but you know my friends and my party might censure me if I quit the campaign just on the eve of the election and my political enemies will say that I ran."

Cox's candidacy was praised by numerous furniture manufacturing executives in North Carolina. Republican Party literature and his own statements emphasized his status as a "businessman candidate". He declared, "the business men of North Carolina are entitled to more voice in the business affairs of the State, and in the legislation affecting the business interests of the State," though he declined to "enter into any elaborate discussion of the political issues of the day." Cox also encouraged fellow businessman John Motley Morehead II to run for the United States House of Representatives 5th congressional district seat as a Republican to strengthen the image of the party's pro-business platform, and they subsequently worked together to appeal to other businessmen for support.

To counter Cox, Democrats portrayed him as too moderate on racial issues and "too busy with his bobbin trust". They also tied him to a labor dispute involving furniture factory workers in High Point in 1906 and accused him of being favorable to railroad companies, which were unpopular in the state at the time due to disputes over their rates. Cox ultimately lost the election to Democratic nominee William Walton Kitchin by 37,342 votes.

== Later life ==
On January 18, 1932, the board of directors of Commercial National Bank announced that, amidst the fallout of the Great Depression, the bank would cease operations. Cox and other bank leaders received threats from the community over the bank closure. Shortly thereafter he fell ill with bronchial pneumonia. He died at his home in High Point on March 29, 1932 at 75 years of age. The timing of his death led to rumors circulating High Point that he had faked his own death to flee the country and avoid the fallout of the bank failure.

== Works cited ==
- Ashe, Samuel A'Court, ed. (1906). Biographical History of North Carolina from Colonial Times to the Present. Vol. VI. Greensboro, N.C.: C. L. Van Noppen.
- Medlin, Eric (2023). Sawdust in Your Pockets : A History of the North Carolina Furniture Industry. Athens: University of Georgia Press. ISBN 9780820365503.
- Steelman, Joseph F. (October 1964). "Jonathan Elwood Cox and North Carolina's Gubernatorial Campaign of 1908". The North Carolina Historical Review. 41 (4): 436–447. JSTOR 23517842.
