= Jacob F. Jacobson =

American politician

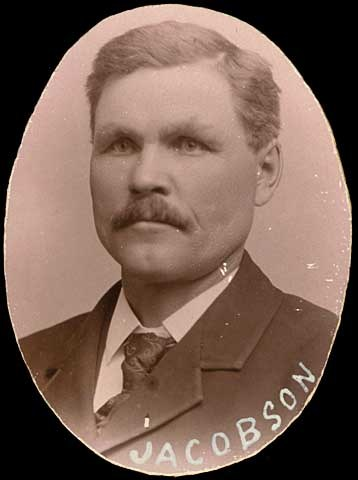

Member of the Minnesota House of Representatives
- In office January 8, 1889 – January 5, 1891
- In office January 3, 1893 – January 5, 1903

Personal details
- Born: January 13, 1849 Ryfylke, Norway
- Died: April 19, 1938 (aged 89) Madison, Minnesota
- Party: Republican

Jacob F. Jacobson (January 13, 1849 – April 19, 1938) was an American businessman and politician.

Jacobson was born in Ryfylke, Rogaland, Norway and emigrated to the United States in 1857. He moved to Dover Township, Fayette County, Iowa and then settled in Madison, Lac qui Parle County, Minnesota in 1871 with his wife and family. He was an agriculture implement dealer. Jacobson served as the Lac qui Parle County Auditor and was the president of the Lac qui Parle County Agriculture Society. Jacobson served in the Minnesota House of Representatives in 1889 and 1890 and from 1893 to 1902. He was a Republican.

In 1908, Jacobson ran for governor against incumbent John Albert Johnson, but lost.

Jacobson died at his home in Madison, Minnesota.

Party political offices
Preceded by A.L. Cole	Republican nominee for Governor of Minnesota; 1908	Succeeded by Adolph Olson Eberhart
