= 1909 United Kingdom local elections =

The 1909 United Kingdom local elections took place in 1909 for municipal councils (including Urban Districts), as well as Rural districts. Municipal elections in Ireland took place in January. Municipal elections across England and Wales, and for Londons Metropolitan Boroughs, were held on Monday 1 November. Scotland held municipal elections the following day.

== London borough elections ==
=== Overall results ===
The elections were the fourth held for Londons Metropolitan Borough councils. Municipal Reform candidates performed well, and the party won several new councils (most prominently Battersea), solidifying the party's hold on London.

The following table shows the aggregate results for the 28 Metropolitan boroughs in London.

Party	Councillors		Councils	
Party	Number	Change	Number	Change
Municipal Reform	977	▲4	24	▲
Progressive	258	▼2	4	▼
Labour	34	▲2	0	Steady
Independent	93	▼4	0	Steady
No overall control	—		0	Steady

=== Results by borough ===
Council	Previous control	Result	Details
Battersea	Progressive	Municipal Reform	Details
Bermondsey		Progressive	Details
Bethnal Green		Progressive	Details
Camberwell		Municipal Reform	Details
Chelsea		Municipal Reform	Details
Deptford		Municipal Reform	Details
Finsbury		Municipal Reform	Details
Fulham		Municipal Reform	Details
Greenwich		Municipal Reform	Details
Hackney		Progressive	Details
Hammersmith		Municipal Reform	Details
Hampstead		Municipal Reform	Details
Holborn		Municipal Reform	Details
Islington		Municipal Reform	Details
Kensington		Municipal Reform	Details
Lambeth		Municipal Reform	Details
Lewisham		Municipal Reform	Details
Paddington		Municipal Reform	Details
Poplar		Municipal Reform	Details
St Marylebone		Municipal Reform	Details
St Pancras		Municipal Reform	Details
Shoreditch		Municipal Reform	Details
Stepney		Municipal Reform	Details
Stoke Newington		Municipal Reform	Details
Southwark		Progressive	Details
Wandsworth		Municipal Reform	Details
Westminster		Municipal Reform	Details
Woolwich		Municipal Reform	Details

== Municipal elections ==
Council	Previous control	Result
Birkenhead		
Birmingham	Unionist	Unionist
Bolton		
Bradford		
Cardiff		
Coventry		Unionist
Croydon		
Edinburgh		
Glasgow		
Leeds	Conservative	Conservative
Leicester		
Liverpool	Conservative	Conservative
Manchester	Conservative	Conservative
Plymouth		
Preston		Unionist
Sheffield		
