= 1908 Texas lieutenant gubernatorial election =

- November 3, 1908
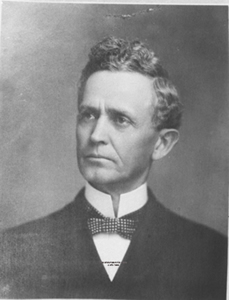

Nominee	Asbury Bascom Davidson	Charles W. Ogden
Party	Democratic	Republican
Popular vote	229,929	65,363
Percentage	75.44%	21.45%
Lieutenant Governor before election
Asbury Bascom Davidson
Democratic
Elected Lieutenant Governor
Asbury Bascom Davidson
Democratic

The 1908 Texas lieutenant gubernatorial election was held on November 3, 1908, in order to elect the lieutenant governor of Texas. Incumbent Democratic lieutenant governor Asbury Bascom Davidson defeated Republican nominee Charles W. Ogden, Socialist nominee N. B. Hunt and Prohibition nominee Edward Rodgers.

== General election ==
On election day, November 3, 1908, incumbent Democratic lieutenant governor Asbury Bascom Davidson won re-election by a margin of 164,566 votes against his foremost opponent Republican nominee Charles W. Ogden, thereby retaining Democratic control over the office of lieutenant governor. Davidson was sworn in for his second term on January 19, 1909.

=== Results ===
Texas lieutenant gubernatorial election, 1908
Party	Candidate	Votes	%
Democratic	Asbury Bascom Davidson (incumbent)	229,929	75.44
Republican	Charles W. Ogden	65,363	21.45
Socialist	N. B. Hunt	7,930	2.60
Prohibition	Edward Rodgers	1,269	0.42
	Scattering	275	0.09
Total votes		304,766	100.00
Democratic hold			
