= William Hodges Mann =

American politician

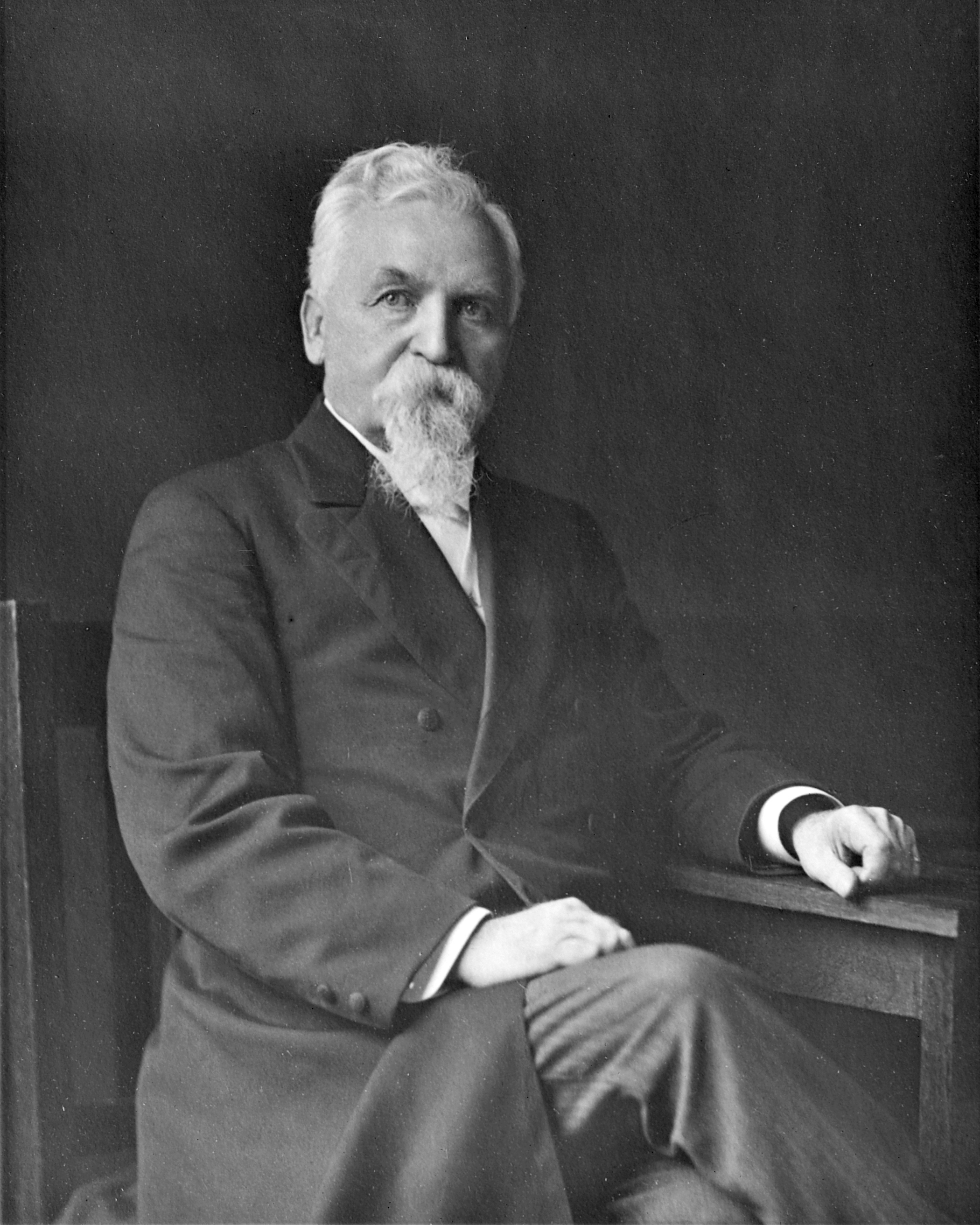

46th Governor of Virginia
- In office February 10, 1910 – February 1, 1914
- Lieutenant: James Taylor Ellyson
- Preceded by: Claude A. Swanson
- Succeeded by: Henry Carter Stuart

Member of the Virginia Senate from the 28th district
- In office December 6, 1899 – January 12, 1910
- Preceded by: Robert Turnbull
- Succeeded by: John J. Owen

Personal details
- Born: William Hodges Mann; July 30, 1843 Williamsburg, Virginia, U.S.
- Died: December 12, 1927 (aged 84) Petersburg, Virginia, U.S.
- Party: Democratic
- Spouses: Sallie Fitzgerald (died 1882); Etta Edloe Donnan
- Children: 2

Military service
- Allegiance: Confederate States
- Branch/service: Confederate States Army
- Rank: Private
- Unit: 12th Virginia Infantry
- Battles/wars: Battle of Seven Pines

William Hodges Mann (July 30, 1843 – December 12, 1927) was an American lawyer, Confederate soldier and Democratic politician who became the first judge of Nottoway County, Virginia and the last Confederate veteran to serve as the Governor of Virginia (from 1910 to 1914).

== Early and family life ==
Born in Williamsburg, Virginia on July 30, 1843, to John and Mary Hunter Bowers Mann. Mann had an older brother, Edwin Murray Mann (1840–1885) who was born in Delaware County, New York and who also became a Virginia judge, but in Petersburg after the American Civil War. Their father died and their mother remarried, to a man named Trotter, whom she survived, dying in 1893. William Mann attended Williamsburg Academy locally, then Brownsburg Academy, a private Presbyterian high school in Brownsburg, Rockbridge County, Virginia in the Shenandoah Valley.

He married twice, first to Sallie Fitzgerald Mann (1845–1882) and later to Etta Edloe Donnan Mann (1861–1960), with whom he had two children: Stewart Donnan Mann (1886–1889) and William Hodges Mann Jr. (1890–1953).

== American Civil War ==
When he was 16, Mann became Deputy Clerk of Nottoway County, Virginia in Southside Virginia. He left to return to Williamsburg and on April 20, 1861, enlisted as a private in Company E of the 12th Virginia Infantry the day after his brother Edward Murry Mann enlisted in the same unit and two days before their brother John Mann (a deputy clerk in the Petersburg Court) enlisted, all as the Civil War. All survived the war, and John Mann was discharged at the end of July 1861 to resume his clerical duties. Initially, the 12th Virginia guarded the vital Norfolk naval yard and port, and the city of Petersburg (an important rail hub and transshipment point). In 1862, responding to the federal Peninsular Campaign, the 12th Virginia became part of "Mahone's Brigade" (named for William Mahone in Longstreet's Corps) in the Army of Northern Virginia. It then participated in several major campaigns. Mann was severely injured during its first significant combat, the Battle of Seven Pines, on June 1, 1862, and during his recovery, he briefly served as a clerk in the Confederate Treasury department in Richmond. Mann later became a scout behind enemy lines and was captured by Union forces in 1863, but escaped, and served again during the federal Siege of Petersburg. Upon partially recovering from his wounds, Mann resumed his office as Deputy Clerk in Nottoway County as the war ended.

== Postwar career ==
After General Lee's surrender at Appomattox Court House, Mann read law. He began practicing law in Nottoway County in 1867, and became involved in Democratic Party politics, eventually with what became known as the Martin Organization organized by future U.S. Senator Thomas Staples Martin. In 1890, the Virginia General Assembly elected Mann judge of Nottoway County. However, his judicial career proved brief.

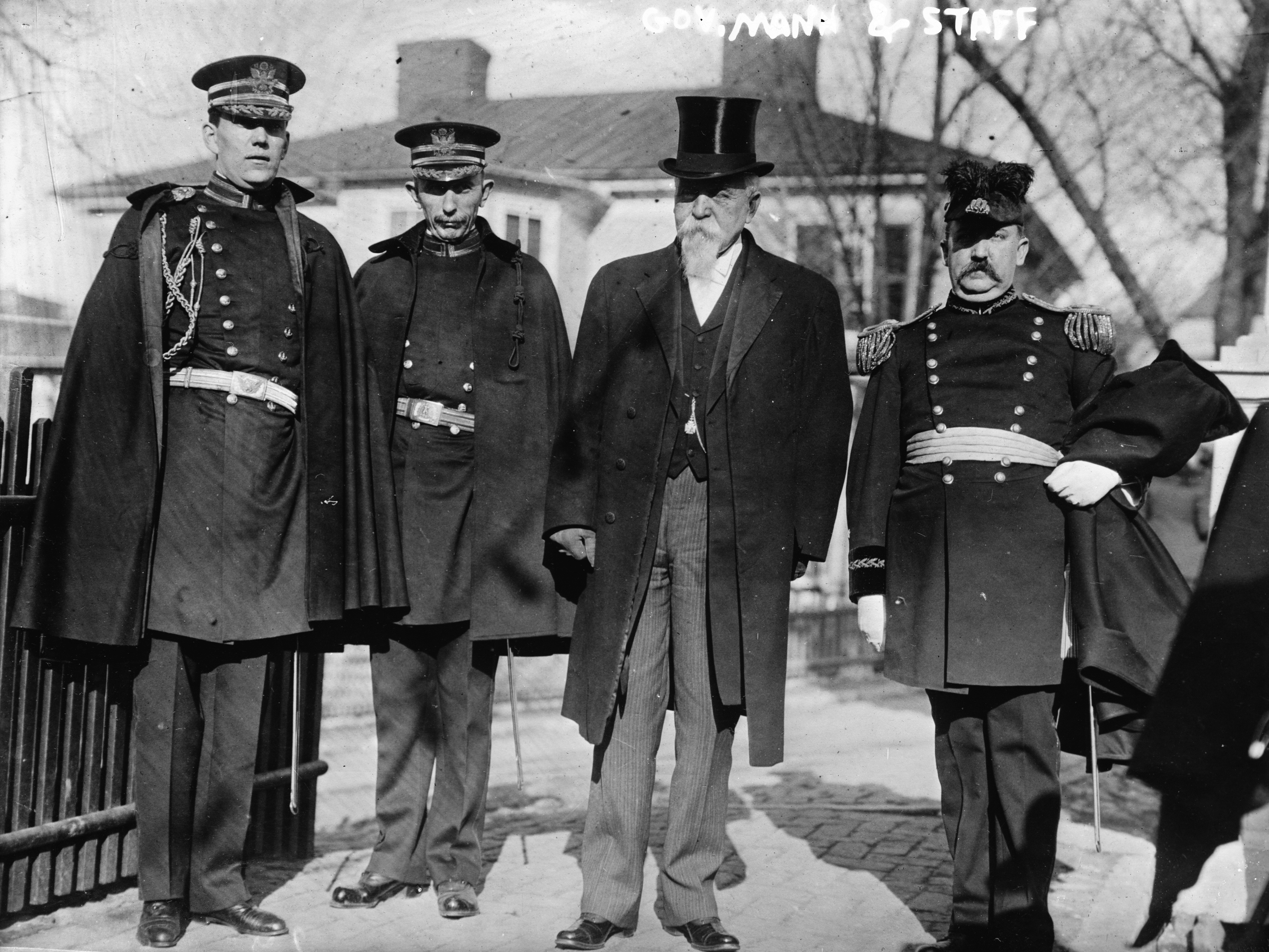
Governor Mann with his staff

Voters from Nottaway County, together with those from adjacent Lunenburg and Brunswick Counties elected Mann to represent them in the Virginia Senate in 1899, and re-elected him several times, although after the 1900 census and 1902 State Constitutional Convention redistricting, the state senatorial district (now numbered the 28th) was redrawn to include not only Nottoway and Lunenburg Counties, but Amelia, Prince Edward and Cumberland Counties instead of Brunswick County (which was put into the 25th District along with Mecklenburg County and represented by F.B. Roberts). (Mann's Senate predecessor, Robert Turnbull, was also a lawyer and was elected clerk of Brunswick County in 1901 and later to the U.S. Congress). Senator Mann became chairman of the committee to revise Virginia Laws. In 1906 he introduced legislation to construct 450 high schools in Virginia, the most progressive educational funding to that date. Mann also favored Prohibition, but only at the state level; the "Mann Law" he authored closed about 800 saloons in counties lacking police protection.

Mann was elected Virginia's governor in 1909 with 63.35% of the vote, defeating Republican William P. Kent and Socialist Labor candidate A.H. Dennitt. Upon taking office in January 1910, Mann became the last Confederate soldier to serve as Governor of Virginia. Governor Mann continued to advocate temperance and public education. During his governorship, Mann refused to prevent the execution of the teen-aged Virginia Christian, a black house maid who was convicted of murdering her white employer, and the subject of a nationwide campaign for clemency.

In 1911, Mann shook hands with President William Howard Taft as part of the Manassas Peace Jubilee marking the 50th anniversary of the First Battle of Bull Run.

== Later years and death ==
Upon leaving office in 1914, Mann returned to his legal practice in Nottoway County and continued to remain active in the Democratic Party. He died on December 12, 1927, aged 84, survived by his second wife (who died in 1960) and son William Hodges Mann (1890–1953), who had become a lawyer and served as Petersburg's mayor. Governor Mann was buried in what became the family plot at historic Blandford Cemetery in Petersburg. The Library of Virginia has his gubernatorial papers.

Party political offices
Preceded by Claude A. Swanson	Democratic nominee for Governor of Virginia; 1909	Succeeded by Henry Carter Stuart
Political offices
Preceded by Claude A. Swanson	Governor of Virginia; 1910–1914	Succeeded by Henry Carter Stuart
