= 1908 Connecticut lieutenant gubernatorial election =

- November 3, 1908
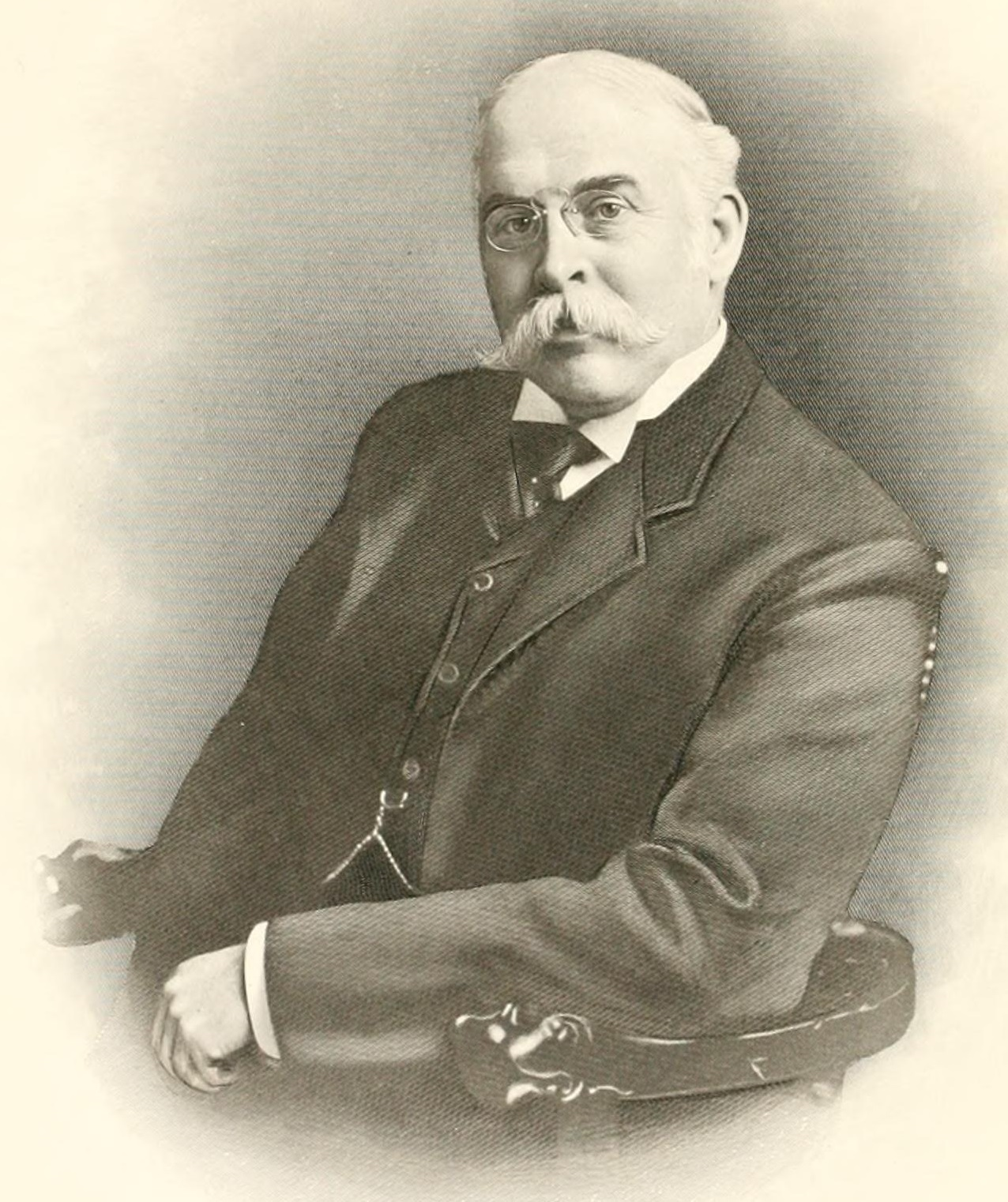

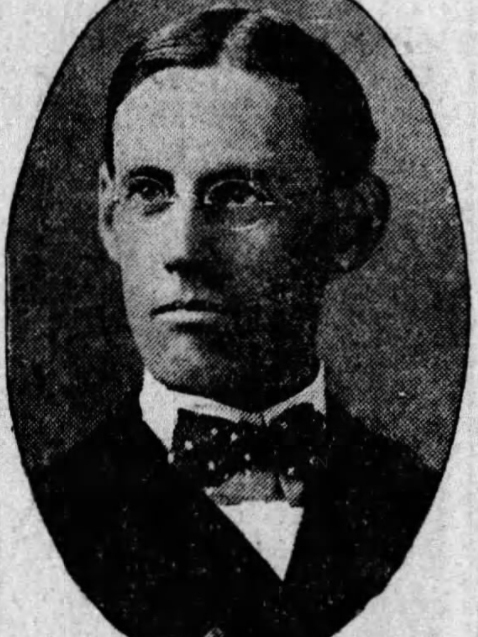
Nominee	Frank B. Weeks	Rollin U. Tyler
Party	Republican	Democratic
Popular vote	110,917	70,683
Percentage	61.10%	38.90%
Lieutenant Governor before election
Everett J. Lake
Republican
Elected Lieutenant Governor
Frank B. Weeks
Republican

The 1908 Connecticut lieutenant gubernatorial election was held on November 3, 1908, to elect the lieutenant governor of Connecticut. Republican nominee Frank B. Weeks won the election against Democratic nominee and former member of the Connecticut House of Representatives Rollin U. Tyler.

== General election ==
On election day, November 3, 1908, Republican nominee Frank B. Weeks won the election with 61.10% of the vote, thereby retaining Republican control over the office of lieutenant governor. Weeks was sworn in as the 73rd lieutenant governor of Connecticut on January 6, 1909.

=== Results ===
Connecticut lieutenant gubernatorial election, 1908
Party	Candidate	Votes	%
Republican	Frank B. Weeks	110,917	61.10
Democratic	Rollin U. Tyler	70,683	38.90
Total votes		181,600	100.00
Republican hold			
