= American-French Genealogical Society =

The American-French Genealogical Society (AFGS) was established in 1978 as a genealogical and historical organization for French-Canadian research. It was founded by members of the Le Foyer Club in Pawtucket, Rhode Island, United States. Its headquarters are in nearby Woonsocket, Rhode Island. Its vast resources include more than 10,000 volumes of repertoires (marriage records), genealogies, biographies, histories, genealogical journals, and publications of regional, national, and international scope.

The society publishes a quarterly journal, Je Me Souviens.
