= 1910 Rhode Island gubernatorial election =

- November 8, 1910
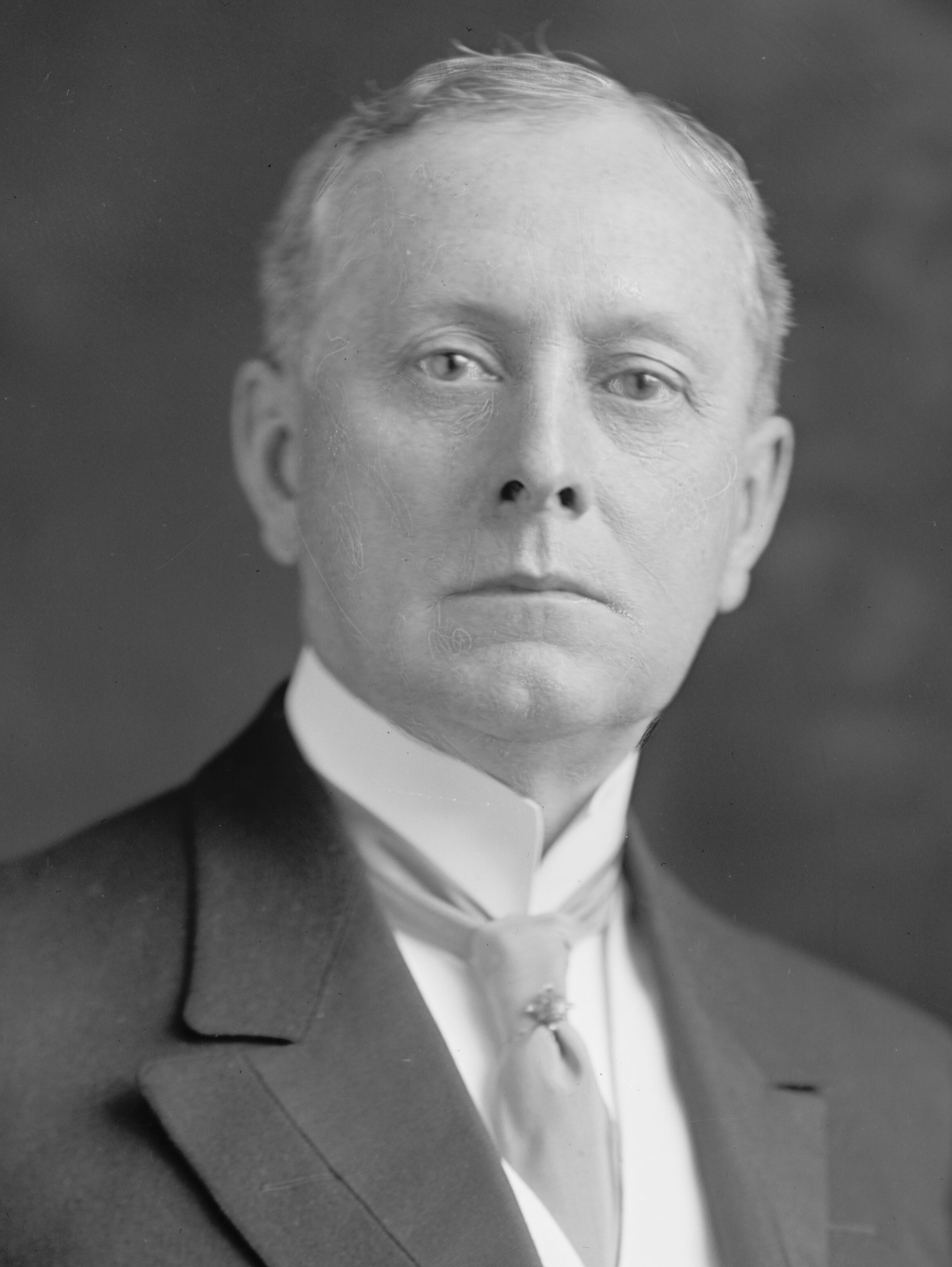

Nominee	Aram J. Pothier	Lewis A. Waterman
Party	Republican	Democratic
Popular vote	33,540	32,400
Percentage	49.60%	47.91%
- Pothier: 50–60% 60–70% 70–80% 80–90% >90% Waterman: 40–50% 50–60% 60–70%
Governor before election
Aram J. Pothier
Republican
Elected Governor
Aram J. Pothier
Republican

The 1910 Rhode Island gubernatorial election was held on November 8, 1910. Incumbent Republican Aram J. Pothier defeated Democratic nominee Lewis A. Waterman with 49.60% of the vote.

== General election ==
=== Candidates ===
Major party candidates

- Aram J. Pothier, Republican
- Lewis A. Waterman, Democratic

Other candidates

- Nathaniel C. Greene, Prohibition
- Thomas F. Herrick, Socialist Labor

=== Results ===
1910 Rhode Island gubernatorial election
Party	Candidate	Votes	%	±%
Republican	Aram J. Pothier (incumbent)	33,540	49.60%	
Democratic	Lewis A. Waterman	32,400	47.91%	
Prohibition	Nathaniel C. Greene	998	1.48%	
Socialist Labor	Thomas F. Herrick	684	1.01%	
Majority		1,140		
Turnout				
Republican hold		Swing		
