= 1910 North Dakota gubernatorial election =

- November 8, 1910
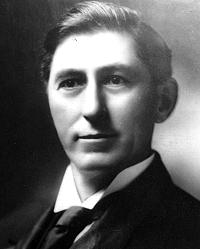

Nominee	John Burke	C. A. Johnson
Party	Democratic	Republican
Popular vote	47,005	44,555
Percentage	49.96%	47.36%
- County results Burke: 40–50% 50–60% 60–70% Johnson: 40–50% 50–60% 60–70% 70–80%
Governor before election
John Burke
Democratic
Elected Governor
John Burke
Democratic

The 1910 North Dakota gubernatorial election was held on November 8, 1910. Incumbent Democrat John Burke defeated Republican nominee C. A. Johnson with 49.96% of the vote.

== Primary elections ==
Primary elections were held on June 29, 1910.

=== Democratic primary ===
==== Candidates ====
- John Burke, incumbent Governor

==== Results ====
Democratic primary results
Party	Candidate	Votes	%
Democratic	John Burke (inc.)	9,770	100.00
Total votes		9,770	100.00

=== Republican primary ===
==== Candidates ====
- C. A. Johnson
- J. A. Buchanan
- Hans H. Aaker
- George W. Wilson
- Smith Stimmel

==== Results ====
Republican primary results
Party	Candidate	Votes	%
Republican	C. A. Johnson	20,591	36.52
Republican	J. A. Buchanan	16,056	28.48
Republican	Hans H. Aaker	11,890	21.09
Republican	George W. Wilson	6,004	10.65
Republican	Smith Stimmel	1,835	3.26
Total votes		56,376	100.00

== General election ==
=== Candidates ===
Major party candidates

- John Burke, Democratic
- C. A. Johnson, Republican

Other candidates

- I. S. Lampman, Socialist

=== Results ===
1910 North Dakota gubernatorial election
Party	Candidate	Votes	%	±%
Democratic	John Burke (inc.)	47,005	49.96	▼1.10
Republican	C. A. Johnson	44,555	47.36	▼1.07
Socialist	I. S. Lampman	2,524	2.68	N/A
Majority		2,450	2.60	▼0.03
Total votes		94,084	100.00	
Democratic hold				

=== County results ===
Results by county were as follows.

Vote Break Down by County
	John Burke Democrat		C. A. Johnson Republican		I. S. Lampman Socialist		Margin		Total
County	Votes	%	Votes	%	Votes	%	Votes	%	Votes
Adams	264	36.11%	454	62.11%	13	1.78%	-190	-25.99%	731
Barnes	1,451	54.14%	1,205	44.96%	24	0.90%	246	9.18%	2,680
Benson	981	52.91%	846	45.63%	27	1.46%	135	7.28%	1,854
Billings	576	31.74%	1,194	65.79%	45	2.48%	-618	-34.05%	1,815
Bottineau	1,464	49.38%	1,313	44.28%	188	6.34%	151	5.09%	2,965
Bowman	366	47.53%	393	51.04%	11	1.43%	-27	-3.51%	770
Burke	653	52.20%	519	41.49%	79	6.31%	134	10.71%	1,251
Burleigh	1,020	44.72%	1,232	54.01%	29	1.27%	-212	-9.29%	2,281
Cass	2,797	52.25%	2,469	46.12%	87	1.63%	328	6.13%	5,353
Cavalier	1,403	50.98%	1,313	47.71%	36	1.31%	90	3.27%	2,752
Dickey	818	55.05%	640	43.07%	28	1.88%	178	11.98%	1,486
Dunn	328	40.44%	469	57.83%	14	1.73%	-141	-17.39%	811
Eddy	566	62.82%	322	35.74%	13	1.44%	244	27.08%	901
Emmons	709	46.95%	789	52.25%	12	0.79%	-80	-5.30%	1,510
Foster	567	53.90%	474	45.06%	11	1.05%	93	8.84%	1,052
Grand Forks	2,515	54.91%	1,956	42.71%	109	2.38%	559	12.21%	4,580
Griggs	658	58.75%	434	38.75%	28	2.50%	224	20.00%	1,120
Hettinger	231	28.91%	561	70.21%	7	0.88%	-330	-41.30%	799
Kidder	353	40.48%	489	56.08%	30	3.44%	-136	-15.60%	872
LaMoure	1,023	55.75%	799	43.54%	13	0.71%	224	12.21%	1,835
Logan	259	33.72%	501	65.23%	8	1.04%	-242	-31.51%	768
McHenry	1,557	52.34%	1,367	45.95%	51	1.71%	190	6.39%	2,975
McIntosh	421	43.95%	526	54.91%	11	1.15%	-105	-10.96%	958
McKenzie	597	51.24%	503	43.18%	65	5.58%	94	8.07%	1,165
McLean	921	44.28%	1,076	51.73%	83	3.99%	-155	-7.45%	2,080
Mercer	281	43.30%	365	56.24%	3	0.46%	-84	-12.94%	649
Morton	1,316	40.40%	1,844	56.62%	914	2.98%	-528	-16.21%	3,257
Mountrail	876	42.24%	1,076	51.88%	108	5.21%	-200	-9.64%	2,074
Nelson	793	44.90%	904	51.19%	69	3.91%	-111	-6.29%	1,766
Oliver	258	42.36%	349	57.31%	2	0.33%	-91	-14.94%	609
Pembina	1,636	54.81%	1,340	44.89%	9	0.30%	296	9.92%	2,985
Pierce	959	61.24%	579	36.97%	28	1.79%	380	24.27%	1,566
Ramsey	1,368	55.14%	1,033	41.64%	80	3.22%	335	13.50%	2,481
Ransom	675	40.52%	961	57.68%	30	1.80%	-286	-17.17%	1,666
Renville	950	53.04%	748	41.76%	93	5.19%	202	11.28%	1,791
Richland	1,759	50.65%	1,700	48.95%	14	0.40%	59	1.70%	3,473
Rolette	1,061	62.93%	460	27.28%	165	9.79%	601	35.65%	1,686
Sargent	770	47.27%	805	49.42%	54	3.31%	-35	-2.15%	1,629
Sheridan	596	44.05%	752	55.58%	5	0.22%	-156	-11.53%	1,353
Stark	763	47.69%	812	50.75%	25	1.56%	-49	-3.06%	1,600
Steele	496	44.01%	617	54.75%	14	1.24%	-121	-10.73%	1,127
Stutsman	1,729	60.88%	1,092	38.45%	19	0.67%	637	22.43%	2,840
Towner	828	52.14%	732	46.10%	28	1.76%	96	6.05%	1,588
Traill	741	42.78%	963	55.60%	28	1.62%	-222	-12.82%	1,732
Walsh	1,889	56.47%	1,378	41.20%	78	2.33%	511	15.28%	3,345
Ward	1,770	46.14%	1,730	45.10%	336	8.76%	40	1.04%	3,836
Wells	1,078	56.98%	803	42.44%	11	0.58%	275	14.53%	1,892
Williams	1,915	50.73%	1,654	43.81%	206	5.46%	261	6.91%	3,775
