= 1908 Minnesota gubernatorial election =

- November 3, 1908
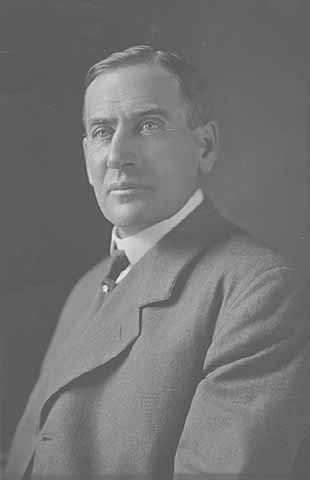

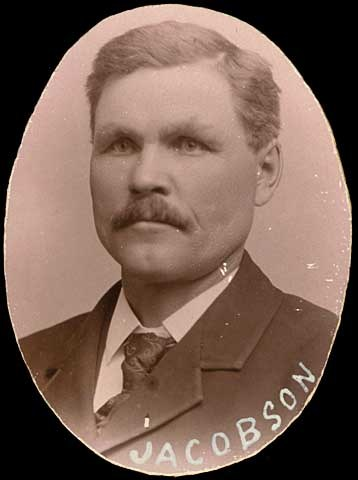
Nominee	John Albert Johnson	Jacob F. Jacobson
Party	Democratic	Republican
Popular vote	175,136	147,997
Percentage	51.93%	43.88%
- County results Johnson: 40–50% 50–60% 60–70% 70–80% Jacobson: 40–50% 50–60% 60–70% 70–80%
Governor before election
John Albert Johnson
Democratic
Elected Governor
John Albert Johnson
Democratic

The 1908 Minnesota gubernatorial election took place on November 3, 1908. Democratic incumbent John Albert Johnson defeated Republican challenger Jacob F. Jacobson. Johnson was only the second governor of Minnesota to be elected to a third term, the first being John S. Pillsbury in 1879. Johnson did not become the second governor to serve three full terms, as he died only eight months into his term, in September of 1909.

== Candidates ==
- William W. Allen, attorney (Independence)
- George D. Haggard, physician (Prohibition)
- Jacob F. Jacobson, member of the Minnesota House of Representatives (Republican)
- John Albert Johnson, incumbent (Democrat)
- Beecher Moore, lecturer (Public Ownership)

== Campaigns ==
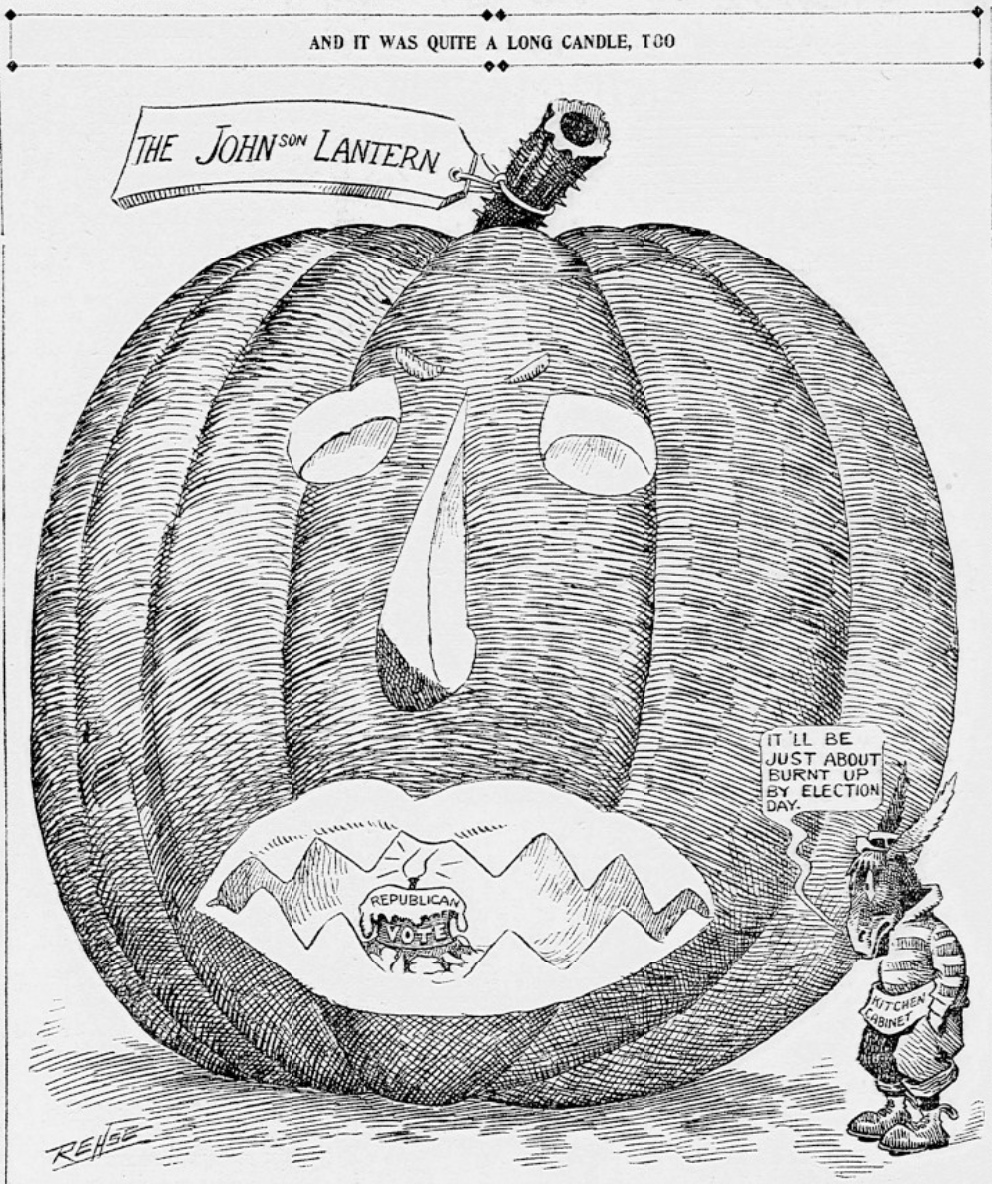
A political cartoon depicting the "burning out" of Republican support for Johnson

The Democratic State Convention was held on August 19, 1908. Johnson was nominated for his third term without opposition. He was unaware he was even a nominee until the convention had concluded and his nomination finalized. When he was asked by a journalist later that day about his thoughts on the renomination, an unaware Johnson replied, "I have not been officially notified of the nomination. I have nothing to say."

The Republican State Convention was held on June 26, 1908. Jacobson was the overwhelming choice, but was contested by Attorney General Edward T. Young. Young's delegates mostly switched to Jacobson before the ballot was called. By the time it came to vote, a motion passed to have the nomination done by acclamation, which was overwhelmingly in favor of Jacobson.

Jacobson was popular with businessmen. Jacobson attempted to market himself as a conservative who was not against progressives.

Johnson's two previous elections had relied almost entirely on defecting Republican votes to win the elections, and the sentiment from both sides was that he would be unable to maintain support among Republicans. Jacobson hoped to being back enough voters to win the election, while Johnson, still popular, attempted to keep them. When the results came out, Jacobson had, in fact, gained about nine percentage points worth of ground, making the election still a comfortable win for Johnson, but his closest result. Jacobson faced difficulty with multiple third-party performances that hindered his campaign. Even with their votes, Johnson still would have had about a four-point lead.

== Results ==
1908 gubernatorial election, Minnesota
Party	Candidate	Votes	%	±%
Democratic	John Albert Johnson (incumbent)	175,136	51.93%	−9.00%
Republican	Jacob F. Jacobson	147,997	43.88%	+9.10%
Prohibition	George D. Haggard	7,024	2.08%	−0.53%
Public Ownership	Beecher Moore	6,516	1.93%	+0.25%
Independence	William W. Allen	593	0.18%	n/a
Majority		27,139	8.05%	
Turnout		337,266		
Democratic hold		Swing		

== See also ==
- List of Minnesota gubernatorial elections
