= 1908 Rhode Island gubernatorial election =

- November 3, 1908
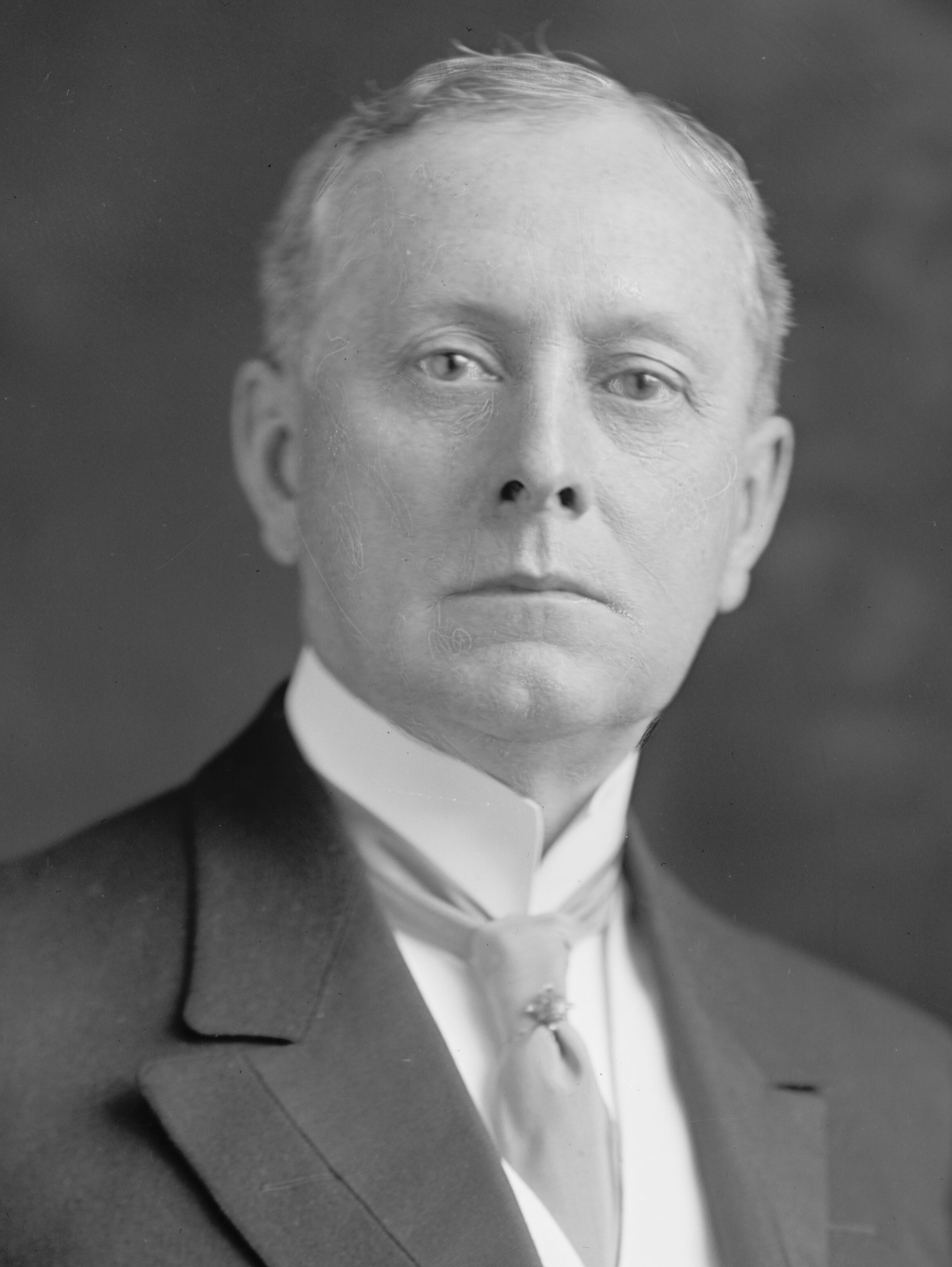

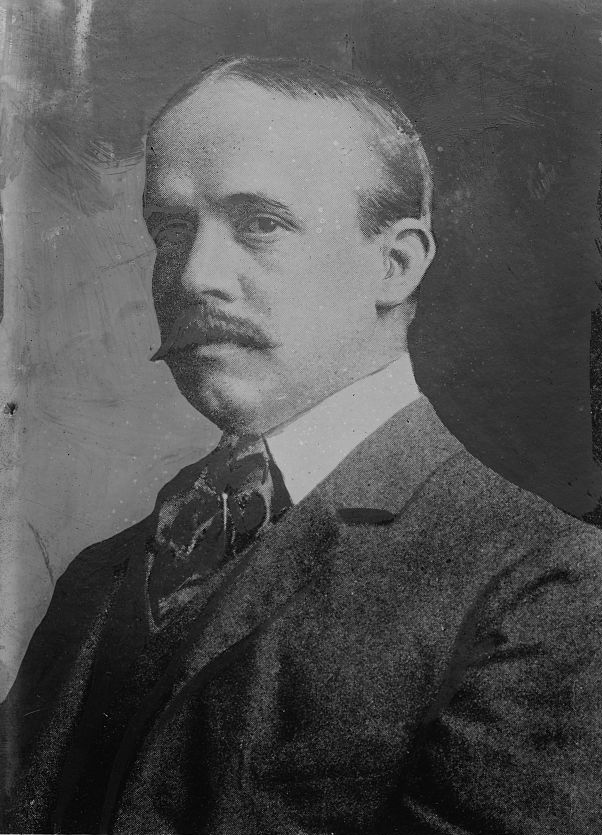
| Nominee | Aram J. Pothier | Olney Arnold |
| Party | Republican | Democratic |
| Popular vote | 38,676 | 31,406 |
| Percentage | 52.61% | 42.72% |
- Pothier: 40–50% 50–60% 60–70% 70–80% 80-90% Arnold: 50–60%
Governor before election
James H. Higgins
Democratic
Elected Governor
Aram J. Pothier
Republican

The 1908 Rhode Island gubernatorial election was held on November 3, 1908. Republican nominee Aram J. Pothier defeated Democratic nominee Olney Arnold with 52.61% of the vote.

== General election ==
=== Candidates ===
Major party candidates

- Aram J. Pothier, Republican
- Olney Arnold, Democratic

Other candidates

- William H. Johnston, Socialist
- Louis E. Remington, Prohibition
- A.E. Mowry, Independent
- Thomas F. Herrick, Socialist Labor

=== Results ===
1908 Rhode Island gubernatorial election
| Party | Candidate | Votes | % | ±% |
|---|---|---|---|---|
| Republican | Aram J. Pothier | 38,676 | 52.61% | |
| Democratic | Olney Arnold | 31,406 | 42.72% | |
| Socialist | William H. Johnston | 1,321 | 1.80% | |
| Prohibition | Louis E. Remington | 1,229 | 1.67% | |
| Independent | A.E. Mowry | 679 | 0.92% | |
| Socialist Labor | Thomas F. Herrick | 198 | 0.27% | |
| Majority | | 31,406 | | |
| Turnout | | | | |
| Republican gain from Democratic | | Swing | | |
