= 1909 Rhode Island gubernatorial election =

- November 2, 1909
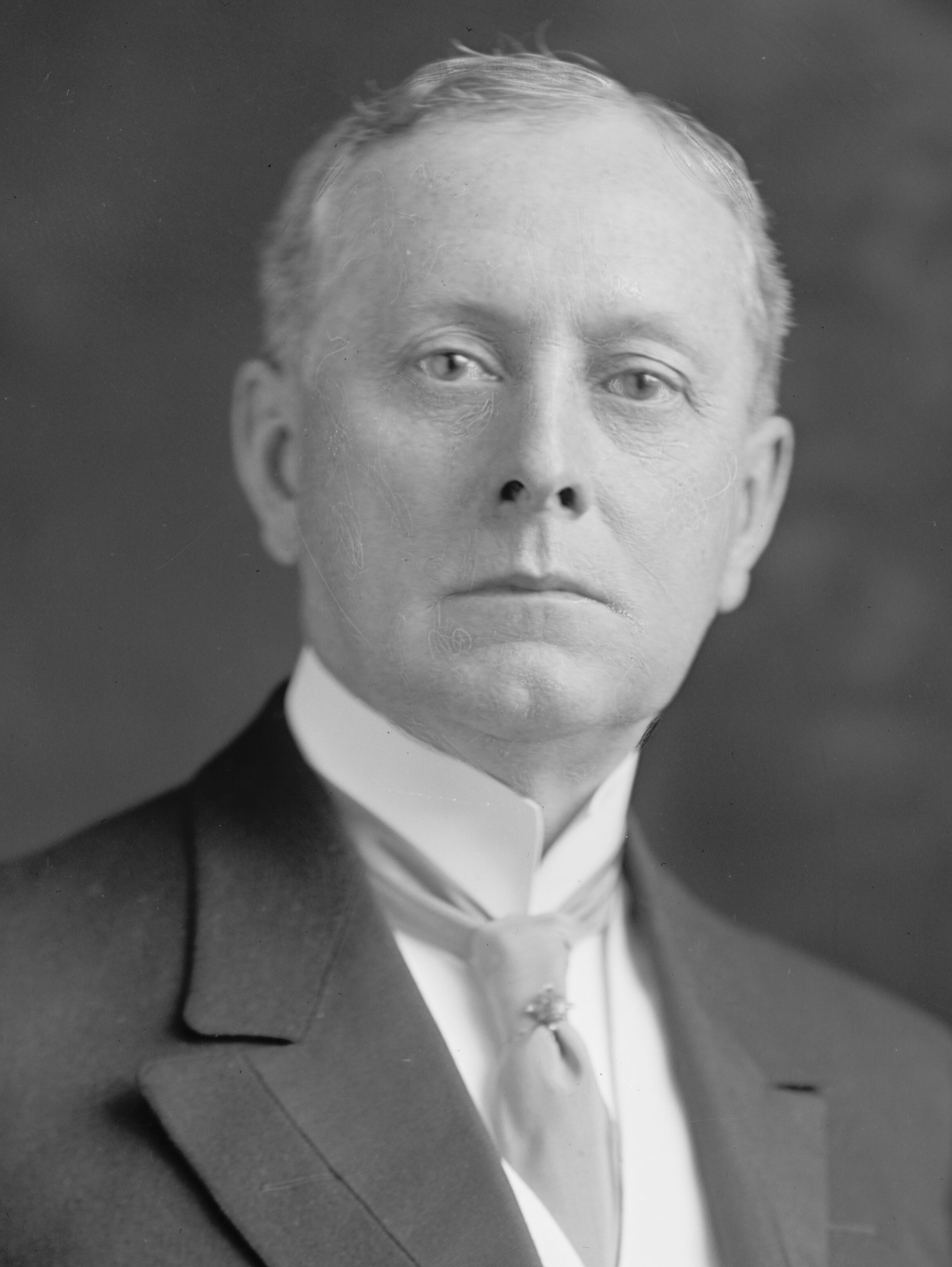

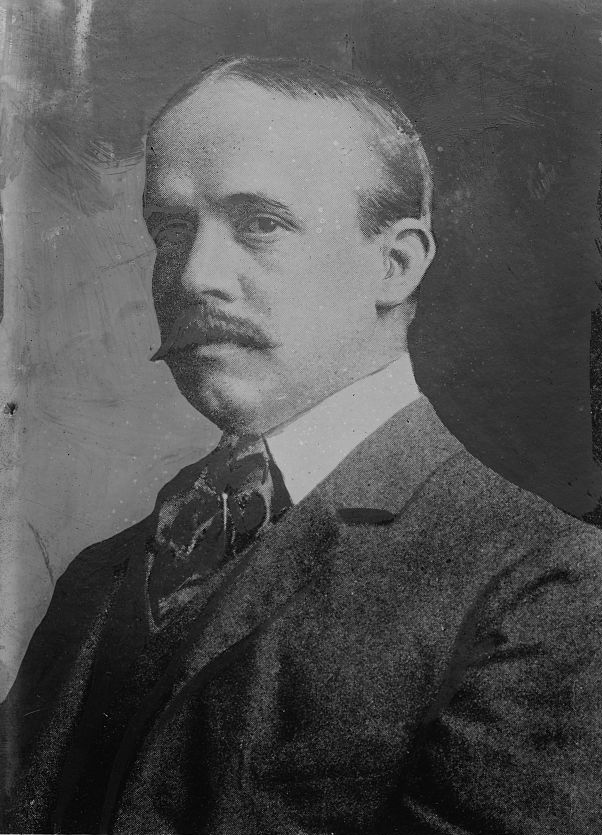
Nominee	Aram J. Pothier	Olney Arnold
Party	Republican	Democratic
Popular vote	37,107	25,338
Percentage	57.00%	38.92%
- Pothier: 40–50% 50–60% 60–70% 70–80% 80-90% Arnold: 40–50% 50–60% 60–70%
Governor before election
Aram J. Pothier
Republican
Elected Governor
Aram J. Pothier
Republican

The 1909 Rhode Island gubernatorial election was held on November 2, 1909. Incumbent Republican Aram J. Pothier defeated Democratic nominee Olney Arnold with 57.00% of the vote.

== General election ==
=== Candidates ===
Major party candidates

- Aram J. Pothier, Republican
- Olney Arnold, Democratic

Other candidates

- Willis H. White, Prohibition
- Frederick W. Hurst, Socialist
- Richard Holland, Socialist Labor

=== Results ===
1909 Rhode Island gubernatorial election
Party	Candidate	Votes	%	±%
Republican	Aram J. Pothier (incumbent)	37,107	57.00%	
Democratic	Olney Arnold	25,338	38.92%	
Prohibition	Willis H. White	1,447	2.22%	
Socialist	Frederick W. Hurst	946	1.45%	
Socialist Labor	Richard Holland	259	0.40%	
Majority		11,769		
Turnout				
Republican hold		Swing		
