= Aram J. Pothier =

American politician (1854–1928)

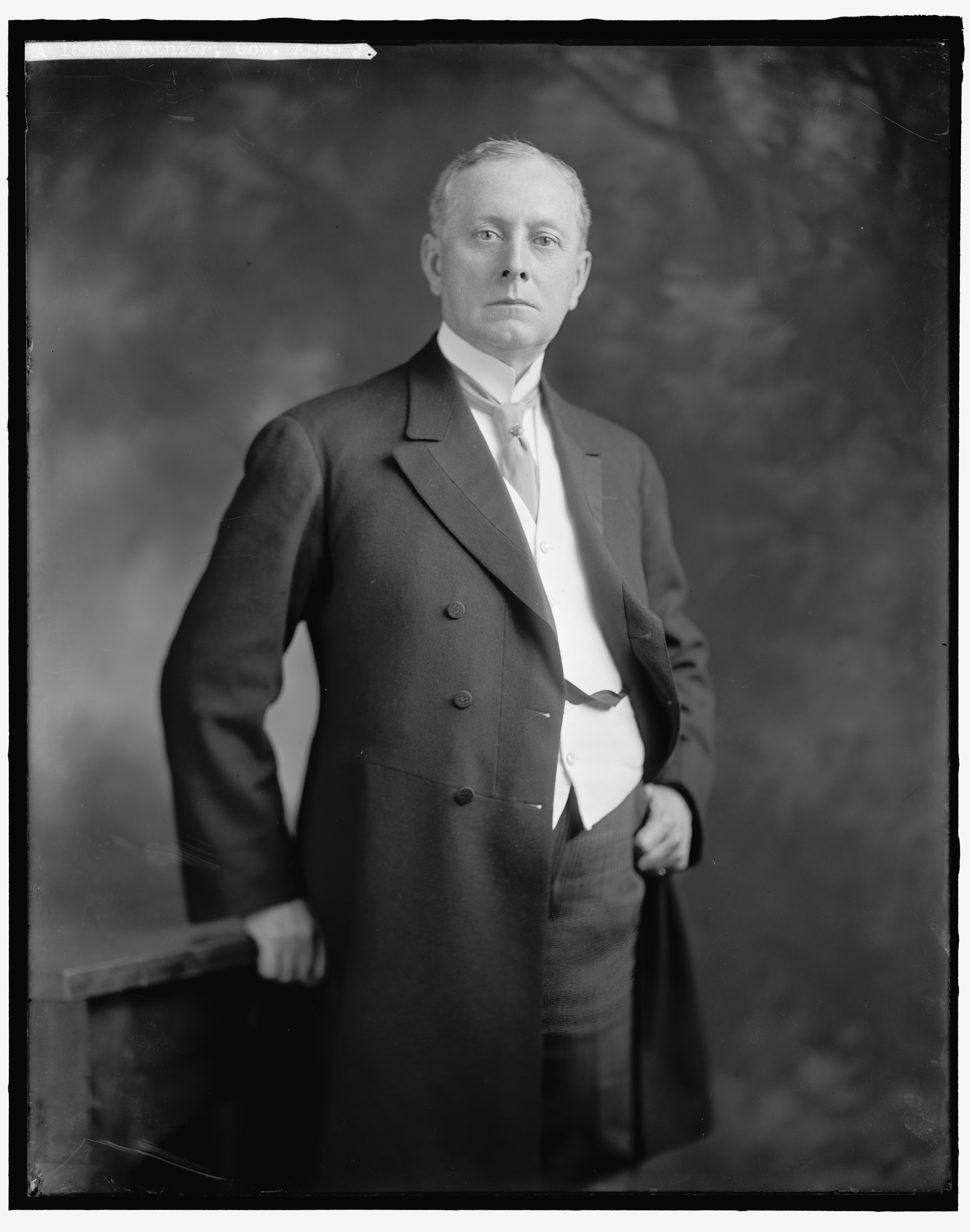
- Pothier, 1905–1928

51st and 55th Governor of Rhode Island
- In office January 5, 1909 – January 5, 1915
- Lieutenant: Arthur Dennis; Zenas W. Bliss; Roswell B. Burchard
- Preceded by: James H. Higgins
- Succeeded by: Robert Livingston Beeckman
- In office January 6, 1925 – February 4, 1928
- Lieutenant: Nathaniel W. Smith; Norman S. Case
- Preceded by: William S. Flynn
- Succeeded by: Norman S. Case

Lieutenant Governor of Rhode Island
- In office 1897–1898
- Governor: Elisha Dyer, Jr.
- Preceded by: Edwin Allen
- Succeeded by: William Gregory

Personal details
- Born: Aram Jules Pothier; July 26, 1854 Quebec City, Quebec, Canada
- Died: February 4, 1928 (aged 73) Woonsocket, Rhode Island, United States
- Resting place: Precious Blood Cemetery
- Party: Republican
- Spouse: Françoise de Charmigny
- Relations: Zacharie Cloutier
- Education: Nicolet College

Aram Jules Pothier (July 26, 1854 – February 4, 1928) was an American banker and politician of French Canadian descent. He served as the 51st and 55th governor of Rhode Island.

== Personal life ==
Pothier was born in Quebec City, Canada East, the son of Jules Pothier and Domiltilde (Dallaire) Pothier. He attended the common schools in Canada and graduated from Nicolet College in Quebec. At the time of his graduation, his parents had already moved to Woonsocket, Rhode Island, and he moved to Woonsocket to join them.

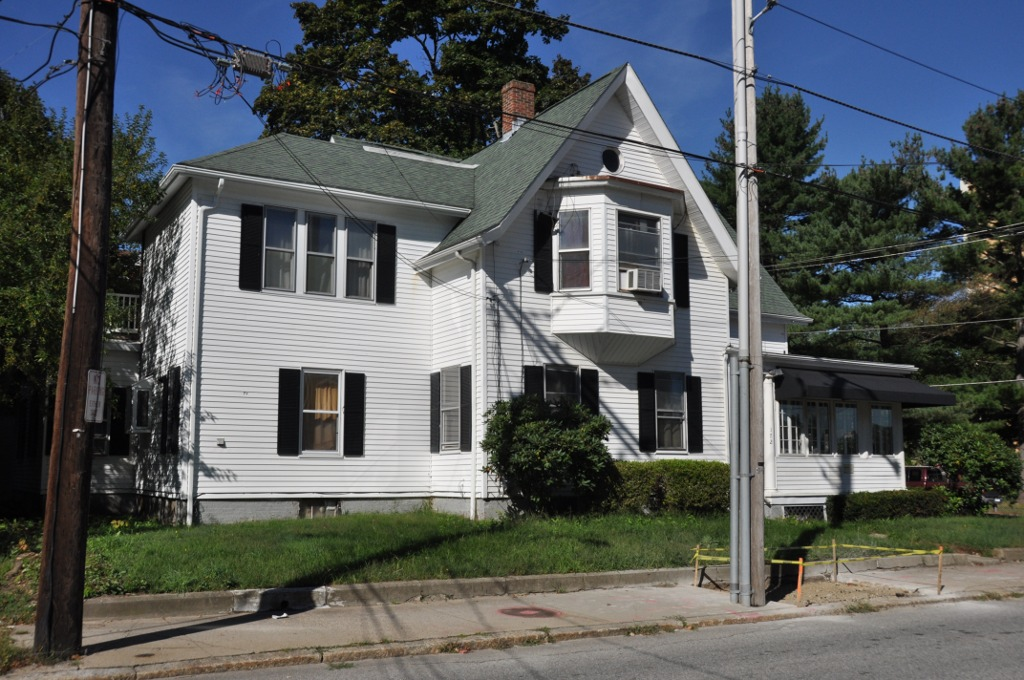
Pothier's house in Woonsocket

Pothier's father purchased a home on Pond Street around 1881, and Aram Pothier lived in the modest 1.5-story home until his death (while serving as governor) in 1928.

He was a clerk for former Congressman Latimer W. Ballou at the Woonsocket Institute for Savings.

Pothier met his wife Françoise de Charmigny in Paris at the 1900 Paris Exhibition. They were married in 1902 in Bridgeport, Connecticut. He is a descendant of Zacharie Cloutier.

== Political career ==
He began his political career in 1885 as a Republican member of the Woonsocket School Committee. He was appointed by Governor Taft to the 1889 Paris Exposition. Pothier was a member of the Rhode Island House of Representatives from 1887 to 1888, and served as city auditor from 1889 to 1894.

He was mayor of Woonsocket from 1894 to 1895, and declined renomination. From 1897 to 1898 he served as Lieutenant Governor of Rhode Island, during the first year that Elisha Dyer, Jr. was governor. After his term as lieutenant governor, he retired from public office, but returned as a member of the Rhode Island Board of Education in 1907. Governor Dyer appointed him to the 1900 Paris Exhibition.

Pothier was elected Governor of Rhode Island in 1908 and entered into service on January 5, 1909. He was reelected to three more one-year terms. At that time, biennial elections replaced annual elections for state officials, and Pothier won the first election for a two-year term as governor in 1912. He retired after this term, on January 5, 1915, when he was succeeded by fellow Republican Robert Livingston Beeckman. In 1915, retiring from politics, he became President of the Woonsocket Institute for Savings and the Providence Union Trust Company. He was again drafted by the Republican Party to run for governor in 1924. He won that election and reelection in 1926, serving from January 6, 1925, until his death on February 4, 1928. He was the first Rhode Island governor of French Canadian descent.

== Death and legacy ==
He died on February 4, 1928, in Woonsocket and is interred in Precious Blood Cemetery in Woonsocket.

A Liberty ship launched June 16, 1944 (hull # 3036) was named SS Aram J. Pothier

In 2010, he was inducted into the American-French Genealogical Society Hall of Fame.

== See also ==
- Pothier House
- List of United States governors born outside the United States

Party political offices
Preceded by Frederick H. Jackson	Republican nominee for Governor of Rhode Island; 1908, 1909, 1910, 1911, 1912	Succeeded by Robert Livingston Beeckman
Preceded by Harold J. Gross	Republican nominee for Governor of Rhode Island; 1924, 1926	Succeeded by Norman S. Case
Political offices
Preceded by Edwin Allen	Lieutenant Governor of Rhode Island; 1897–1898	Succeeded by William Gregory
Preceded by James H. Higgins	Governor of Rhode Island; 1909–1915	Succeeded by Robert Livingston Beeckman
Preceded by William S. Flynn	Governor of Rhode Island; 1925–1928	Succeeded by Norman S. Case
