= 1909 Virginia gubernatorial election =

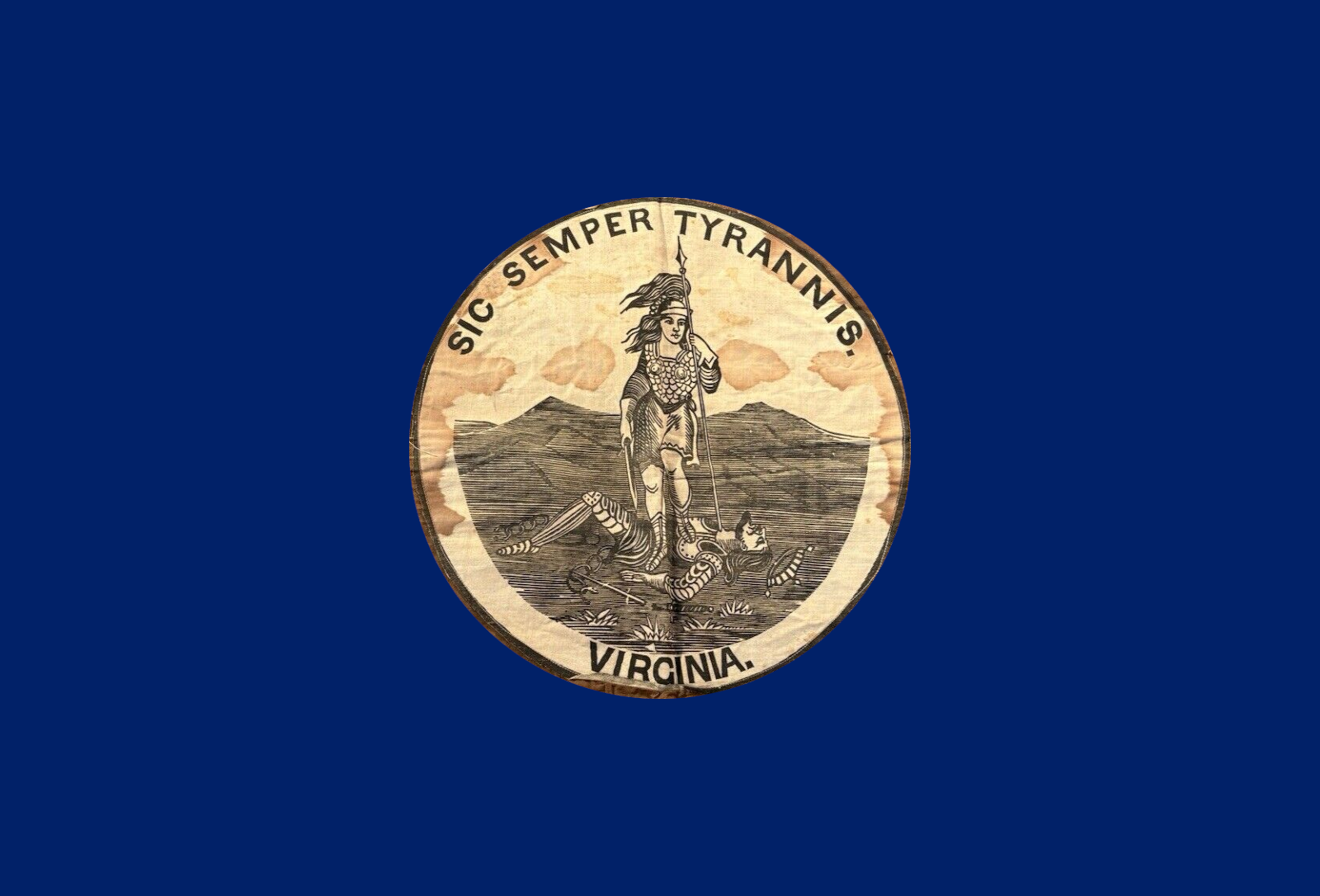
- November 2, 1909
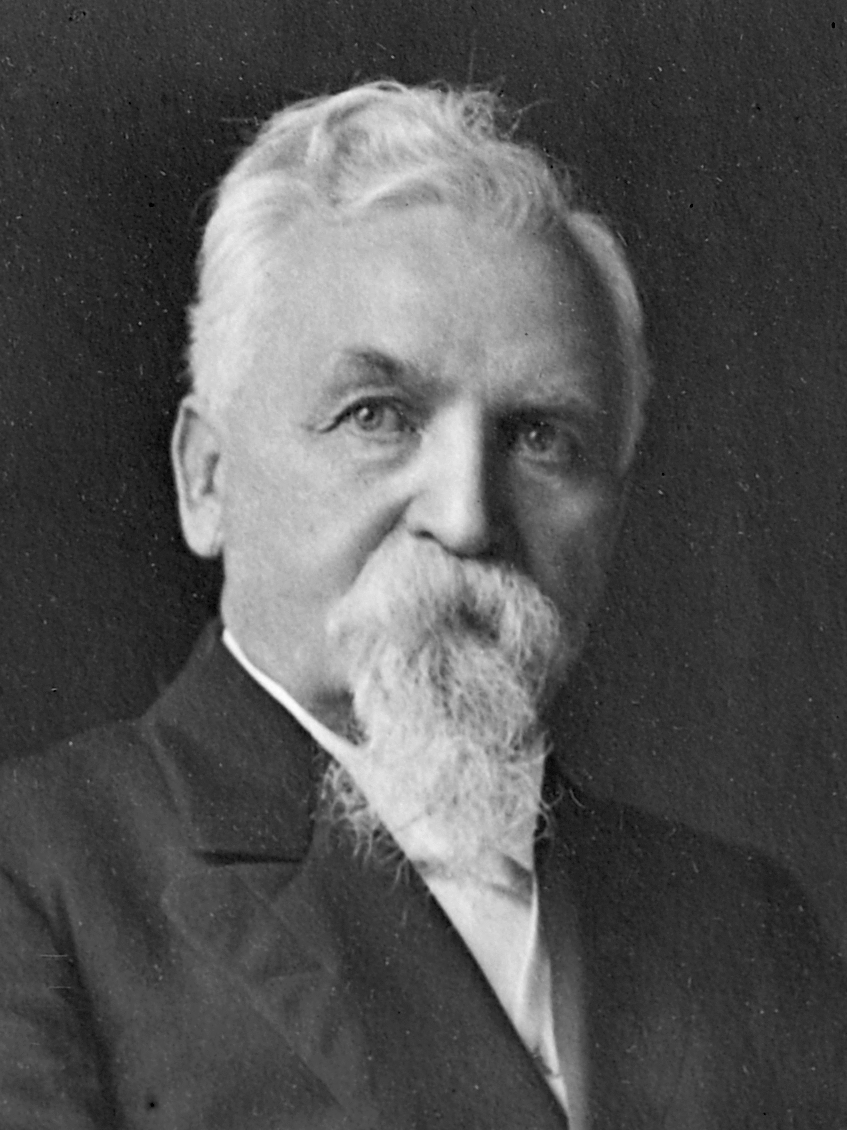

Nominee	William Hodges Mann	William P. Kent
Party	Democratic	Republican
Popular vote	70,759	40,357
Percentage	63.35%	36.13%
- County results Mann: 50–60% 60–70% 70–80% 80–90% 90–100% Kent: 50–60% 60–70%
Governor before election
Claude A. Swanson
Democratic
Elected Governor
William Hodges Mann
Democratic

The 1909 Virginia gubernatorial election was held on November 2, 1909, to elect the governor of Virginia.

== Results ==
Virginia gubernatorial election, 1909
Party	Candidate	Votes	%
Democratic	William Hodges Mann	70,759	63.35%
Republican	William P. Kent	40,357	36.13%
Socialist Labor	A. H. Dennett	569	0.51%
Write-ins		3	<0.01%
Total votes		111,688	100.00%
Democratic hold			
