= Olney Arnold =

American diplomat

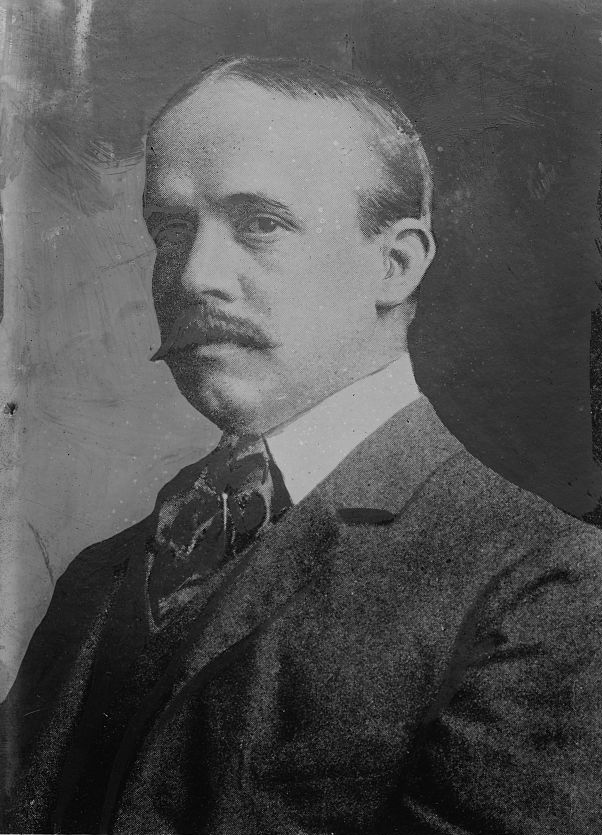
Arnold in the 1910s

Olney Arnold (September 8, 1861 - March 5, 1916) was the United States Ambassador to Egypt from 1913 to 1916. In 1908 he was a member of the Rhode Island House of Representatives.

== Biography ==
He was born on September 8, 1861, in Cumberland, Rhode Island. He was appointed United States Ambassador to Egypt on September 2, 1913, and presented his credentials on March 23, 1914. He left the position on January 8, 1916.

He left Egypt aboard the SS Patria when it was attacked by a German submarine on March 1, 1916, off the coast of Tunis.

He died on March 5, 1916, in Lisbon, Portugal. He was buried in Swan Point Cemetery in Providence, Rhode Island.

Party political offices
Preceded by James H. Higgins	Democratic nominee for Governor of Rhode Island; 1908, 1909	Succeeded by Lewis A. Waterman
