= 1908 North Carolina gubernatorial election =

- November 3, 1908
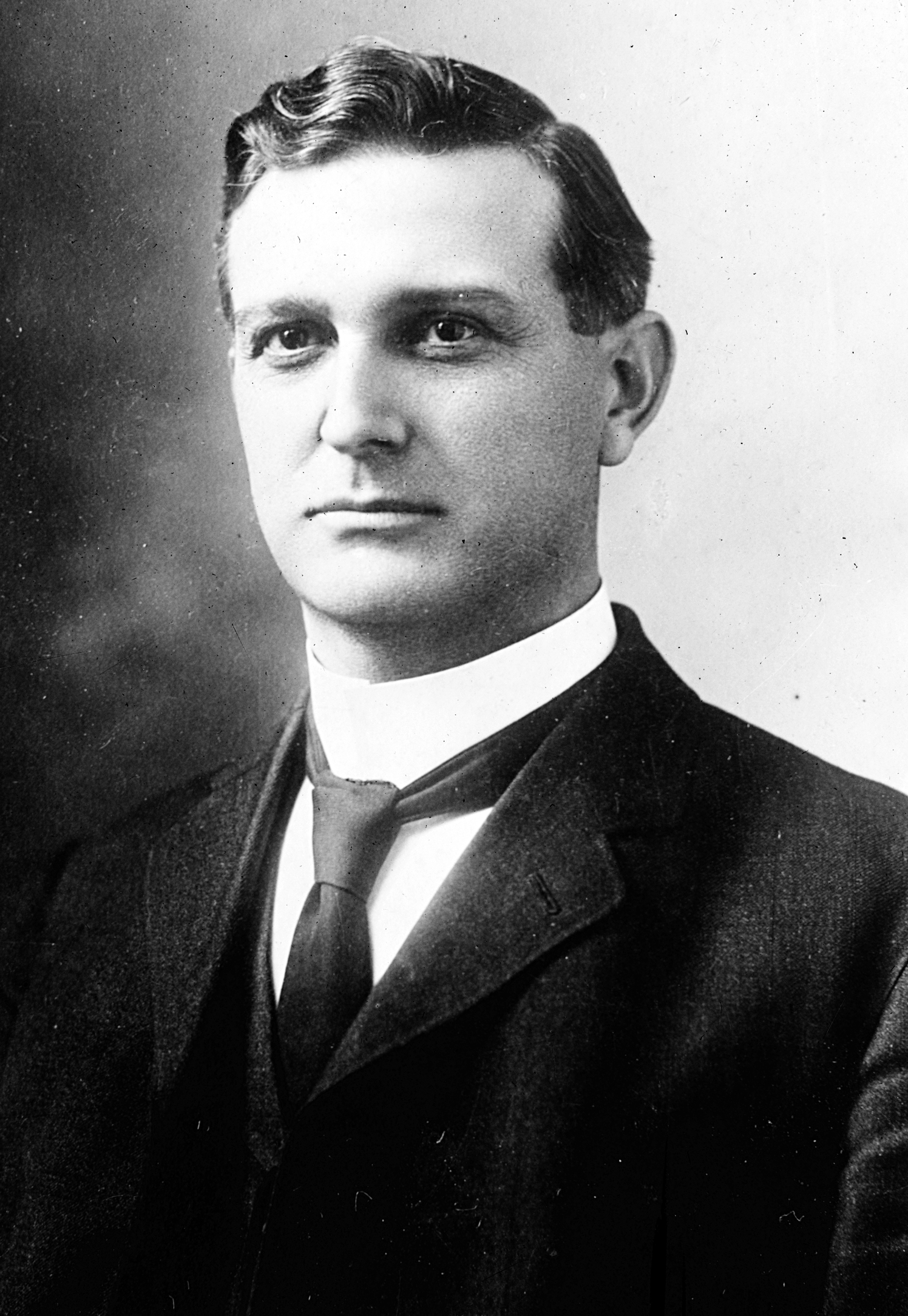

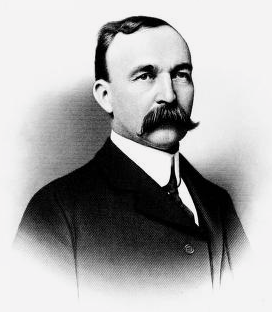
Nominee	William Walton Kitchin	J. Elwood Cox
Party	Democratic	Republican
Popular vote	145,102	107,760
Percentage	57.31%	42.56%
- County results Kitchin: 50–60% 60–70% 70–80% 80–90% >90% Cox: 50–60% 60–70% Tie: 50%
Governor before election
Robert Broadnax Glenn
Democratic
Elected Governor
William Walton Kitchin
Democratic

The 1908 North Carolina gubernatorial election was held on November 3, 1908. Democratic nominee William Walton Kitchin defeated Republican nominee J. Elwood Cox with 57.31% of the vote. At the time, Kitchin was a congressman, while Cox was a banker and manufacturer.

== Democratic convention ==
The Democratic convention was held on June 27, 1908.

=== Candidates ===
- William Walton Kitchin, U.S. Representative
- Locke Craig, former State Representative
- Ashley Horne

=== Results ===
Democratic convention results
Party	Candidate	Votes	%
Democratic	William Walton Kitchin	380	44.39
Democratic	Locke Craig	327	38.20
Democratic	Ashley Horne	149	17.41
Total votes		856	100.00

== General election ==
=== Candidates ===
Major party candidates

- William Walton Kitchin, Democratic
- J. Elwood Cox, Republican

Other candidates

- J.A. Transon, Socialist

=== Results ===
1908 North Carolina gubernatorial election
Party	Candidate	Votes	%	±%
Democratic	William Walton Kitchin	145,102	57.31%	
Republican	J. Elwood Cox	107,760	42.56%	
Socialist	J.A. Transon	342	0.14%	
Majority		37,342		
Turnout				
Democratic hold		Swing		
