= 1912 United States gubernatorial elections =

- November 5, 1912 (Note: Elections were held earlier in Arkansas, Georgia, Maine, and Vermont.)

33 governorships (Note: Including a special election in Georgia.)
	Majority party	Minority party
Party	Democratic	Republican
Seats before	26	20
Seats after	30	16
Seat change	▲4	▼4
Seats up	16	17
Seats won	20	13
	Third party
Party	Progressive
Seats before	2 (Note: California Governor Hiram Johnson (R) and Wyoming Governor Joseph M. Carey (D) joined the Progressive Party on its formation.)
Seats after	2
Seat change	Steady
Seats up	0
Seats won	0
- Democratic gain Democratic hold Republican gain Republican hold

United States gubernatorial elections were held in 1912, in 33 states, concurrent with the House, Senate elections and presidential election, on November 5, 1912 (except in Arkansas, Georgia, Maine and Vermont). In addition, there was a special election in Georgia on January 10, 1912.

In Rhode Island, the governor was elected to a two-year term for the first time, instead of a one-year term. In Vermont, the gubernatorial election was held in September for the last time, moving to the same day as federal elections from the 1914 elections.

== Results ==
=== Special election (January 1912) ===
State	Incumbent	Party	Status	Opposing candidates
Georgia (special election) (held, January 10, 1912)	John M. Slaton	Democratic	[data missing]	Joseph M. Brown (Democratic) 98.97% A. F. Castleberry (Socialist) 1.03% (Democratic primary results); Joseph M. Brown 39.46% J. Pope Brown 34.57% R. B. Russell 25.97%

=== Regular elections (Autumn 1912) ===
State	Incumbent	Party	Status	Opposing candidates
Arkansas (held, September 9, 1912)	George Washington Donaghey	Democratic	Defeated in Democratic primary, Democratic victory	Joseph Taylor Robinson (Democratic) 64.74% Andrew I. Roland (Republican) 27.37% G. E. Mikel (Socialist) 7.89%
Colorado	John F. Shafroth	Democratic	Retired to run for U.S. Senate, Democratic victory	Elias M. Ammons (Democratic) 42.91% Edward P. Costigan (Progressive) 24.88% Clifford C. Parks (Republican) 23.73% Charles A. Ashelstrom (Socialist) 6.09% John Henry Ketchum (Prohibition) 2.22% Jonathan U. Billings (Socialist Labor) 0.17%
Connecticut	Simeon E. Baldwin	Democratic	Re-elected, 41.11%	J. P. Studley (Republican) 35.47% Herbert Smith (Progressive) 16.29% Samuel E. Beardsley (Socialist) 5.38% B. B. Bassette (Prohibition) 1.10% Charles B. Wells (Socialist Labor) 0.66%
Delaware	Simeon S. Pennewill	Republican	[data missing]	Charles R. Miller (Republican) 46.95% Thomas M. Monaghan (Democratic) 44.30% George B. Hynson (Progressive) 6.23% John Heyd (Prohibition) 1.37% Norman L. Rearick (Socialist) 1.15%
Florida	Albert W. Gilchrist	Democratic	Term-limited, Democratic victory	Park Trammell (Democratic) 80.42% Thomas W. Cox (Socialist) 7.15% William R. O'Neal (Republican) 5.46% William C. Hodges (Progressive) 4.78% J. W. Bingham (Prohibition) 2.19%
Georgia (held, October 2, 1912)	Joseph Mackey Brown	Democratic	[data missing]	John M. Slaton (Democratic) 100.00% (Democratic primary results); John M. Slaton 62.14% Hooper Alexander 23.13% Joe Hill Hall 14.73%
Idaho	James H. Hawley	Democratic	Defeated, 32.22%	John M. Haines (Republican) 33.24% G. H. Martin (Progressive) 23.05% L. A. Coblentz (Socialist) 10.51% Scattering 0.97%
Illinois	Charles S. Deneen	Republican	Defeated, 27.39%	Edward F. Dunne (Democratic) 38.11% Frank H. Funk (Progressive) 26.09% John C. Kennedy (Socialist) 6.77% Edward Worrell (Prohibition) 1.31% John M. Francis (Socialist Labor) 0.34%
Indiana	Thomas R. Marshall	Democratic	Retired, Democratic victory	Samuel M. Ralston (Democratic) 42.95% Albert J. Beveridge (Progressive) 25.99% Winfield T. Durbin (Republican) 22.10% Stephen N. Reynolds (Socialist) 5.53% William H. Hickman (Prohibition) 2.88% James Matthews (Socialist Labor) 0.45% Scattering 0.10%
Iowa	Beryl F. Carroll	Republican	Retired, Republican victory	George W. Clarke (Republican) 39.93% Edward G. Dunn (Democratic) 39.56% John L. Stevens (Progressive) 15.59% I. S. McCrillis (Socialist) 3.25% C. Durant Jones (Prohibition) 1.68%
Kansas	Walter R. Stubbs	Republican	Retired to run for U.S. Senate, Democratic victory	George H. Hodges (Democratic) 46.55% Arthur Capper (Republican) 46.54% George W. Kleihege (Socialist) 6.89% Scattering 0.02%
Maine (held, September 9, 1912)	Frederick W. Plaisted	Democratic	Defeated, 47.70%	William T. Haines (Republican) 49.97% George Allan England (Socialist) 1.47% William I. Sterling (Prohibition) 0.86% Scattering 0.01%
Massachusetts	Eugene Foss	Democratic	Re-elected, 40.60%	Joseph Walker (Republican) 30.18% Charles S. Bird (Progressive) 25.77% Roland D. Sawyer (Socialist) 2.42% Frank N. Rand (Prohibition) 0.57% Patrick Mulligan (Socialist Labor) 0.47%
Michigan	Chase Osborn	Republican	Retired, Democratic victory	Woodbridge N. Ferris (Democratic) 35.35% Amos S. Musselman (Republican) 30.96% L. Whitney Watkins (Progressive) 28.31% James Hoogerhyde (Socialist) 3.90% Jefferson D. Leland (Prohibition) 1.42% Herman Richter (Socialist Labor) 0.07%
Minnesota	Adolph O. Eberhart	Republican	Re-elected, 40.73%	Peter M. Ringdahl (Democratic) 31.30% Paul V. Collins (Progressive) 10.51% Engebret E. Lobeck (Prohibition) 9.38% David Morgan (Public Ownership) 8.09%
Missouri	Herbert S. Hadley	Republican	Term-limited, Democratic victory	Elliott W. Major (Democratic) 48.20% John C. McKinley (Republican) 31.15% Albert D. Nortoni (Progressive) 15.61% William A. Ward (Socialist) 4.03% Charles E. Stokes (Prohibition) 0.75% Charles Rogers (Socialist Labor) 0.27%
Montana	Edwin L. Norris	Democratic	[data missing]	Samuel V. Stewart (Democratic) 31.73% Harry L. Wilson (Republican) 28.70% Frank J. Edwards (Progressive) 23.61% Lewis J. Duncan (Socialist) 15.96%
Nebraska	Chester H. Aldrich	Republican	Defeated, 45.33%	John H. Morehead (Democratic) 49.27% Clyde J. Wright (Socialist) 3.96% Nathan Wilson (Prohibition) 1.45%
New Hampshire	Robert P. Bass	Republican	Retired, Democratic victory	Samuel D. Felker (Democratic) 41.07% Franklin Worcester (Republican) 39.03% Winston Churchill (Progressive) 17.29% William H. Wilkins (Socialist) 2.01% Alva H. Morrill (Prohibition) 0.60%
New York	John Alden Dix	Democratic	Lost Democratic nomination, Democratic victory	William Sulzer (Democratic) 41.46% Job E. Hedges (Republican) 28.35% Oscar S. Straus (Progressive) 25.10% Charles Edward Russell (Socialist) 3.63% T. Alexander MacNicholl (Prohibition) 1.21% John Hall (Socialist Labor) 0.24%
North Carolina	William Walton Kitchin	Democratic	Term-limited, Democratic victory	Locke Craig (Democratic) 61.35% Iredell Meares (Progressive) 20.42% Thomas Settle III (Republican) 17.84% H. E. Hodges (Socialist) 0.39%
North Dakota	John Burke	Democratic	Retired, Republican victory	Louis B. Hanna (Republican) 45.45% Frank O. Hellstrom (Democratic) 36.01% W. D. Sweet (Progressive) 10.74% A. E. Bowen Jr. (Socialist) 7.80%
Ohio	Judson Harmon	Democratic	Retired, Democratic victory	James M. Cox (Democratic) 42.38% Robert B. Brown (Republican) 26.29% Arthur Lovett Garford (Progressive) 21.02% Charles Emil Ruthenberg (Socialist) 8.46% Daniel A. Polling (Prohibition) 1.60% John Kircher (Socialist Labor) 0.26%
Rhode Island	Aram J. Pothier	Republican	Re-elected, 43.67%	Theodore Francis Green (Democratic) 41.87% Albert H. Humes (Progressive) 10.82% Samuel H. Fassel (Socialist) 2.45% Willis H. White (Prohibition) 0.88% Thomas F. Herrick (Socialist Labor) 0.32%
South Carolina	Coleman Livingston Blease	Democratic	Re-elected, 99.53%	R. B. Britton (Socialist) 0.47% (Democratic primary results); Coleman Livingston Blease 50.96% Ira B. Jones 47.34% John T. Duncan 1.70%
South Dakota	Robert S. Vessey	Republican	Retired, Republican victory	Frank M. Byrne (Republican) 48.51% Edwin S. Johnson (Democratic) 45.70% Samuel Lovett (Socialist) 2.95% O. W. Butterfield (Prohibition) 2.83%
Tennessee	Ben W. Hooper	Republican	Re-elected, 50.10%	Benton McMillin (Democratic) 46.87% Scattering 3.03%
Texas	Oscar Branch Colquitt	Democratic	Re-elected, 77.82%	Reddin Andrews (Socialist) 8.39% C. W. Johnson (Republican) 7.67% Ed C. Lasater (Progressive) 5.24% Andrew Jackson Houston (Prohibition) 0.78% K. E. Choate (Socialist Labor) 0.10% (Democratic primary results); Oscar Branch Colquitt 55.00% William F. Ramsey 45.00%
Utah	William Spry	Republican	Re-elected, 38.17%	John Franklin Tolton (Democratic) 32.36% Nephi L. Morris (Progressive) 21.16% Homer P. Burt (Socialist) 7.89% E. A. Battell (Socialist Labor) 0.43%
Vermont (held, September 3, 1912)	John A. Mead	Republican	Retired, Republican victory	Allen Miller Fletcher (Republican) 40.47% Harland Bradley Howe (Democratic) 30.85% Fraser Metzger (Progressive) 24.10% Clement F. Smith (Prohibition) 2.68% Frederick W. Suitor (Socialist) 1.87% Scattering 0.04% (General Assembly result) (Note: Since no candidate received 50% of the vote, the state legislature decided the election.) √ Allen Miller Fletcher (Republican) 163; Harland Bradley Howe (Democratic) 76; Frazer Metzger (Progressive) 32
Washington	Marion E. Hay	Republican	Defeated, 30.35%	Ernest Lister (Democratic) 30.55% Robert T. Hodge (Progressive) 24.44% Anna A. Maley (Socialist) 11.67% George F. Stivers (Prohibition) 2.56% Abraham Lincoln Brearcliff (Socialist Labor) 0.43%
West Virginia	William E. Glasscock	Republican	Term-limited, Republican victory	Henry Drury Hatfield (Republican) 47.74% W. R. Thompson (Democratic) 44.47% Walter B. Hilton (Socialist) 5.61% Goodloe Jackson (Prohibition) 2.19%
Wisconsin	Francis E. McGovern	Republican	Re-elected, 45.54%	John C. Karel (Democratic) 42.48% Carl D. Thompson (Social Democrat) 8.75% Charles Lewis Hill (Prohibition) 2.40% William H. Curtis (Socialist Labor) 0.83% Scattering 0.01%

== See also ==
- 1912 United States elections
  - 1912 United States presidential election
  - 1912–13 United States Senate elections
  - 1912 United States House of Representatives elections

== Bibliography ==
- The World Almanac and Encyclopedia, 1913. New York: The Press Publishing Co. (The New York World). 1912.
