= 1912 Florida gubernatorial election =

- November 5, 1912
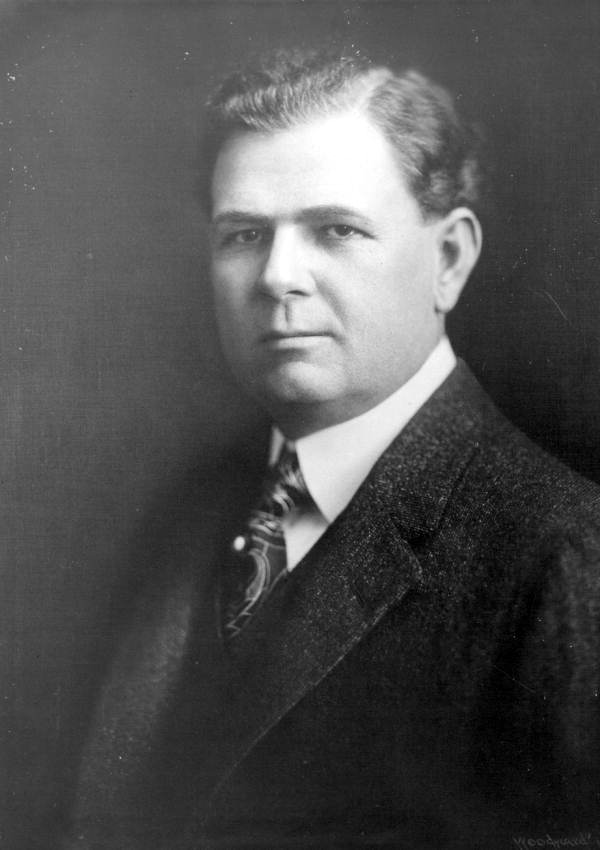

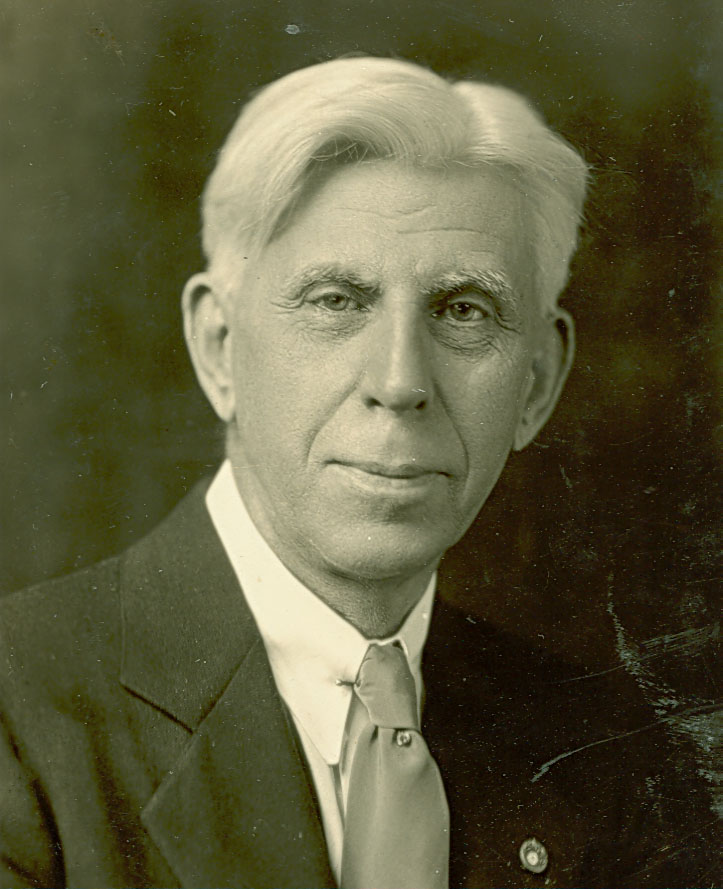
Nominee	Park Trammell	Thomas W. Cox	William R. O'Neal
Party	Democratic	Socialist	Republican
Popular vote	38,977	3,467	2,646
Percentage	80.42%	7.15%	5.46%

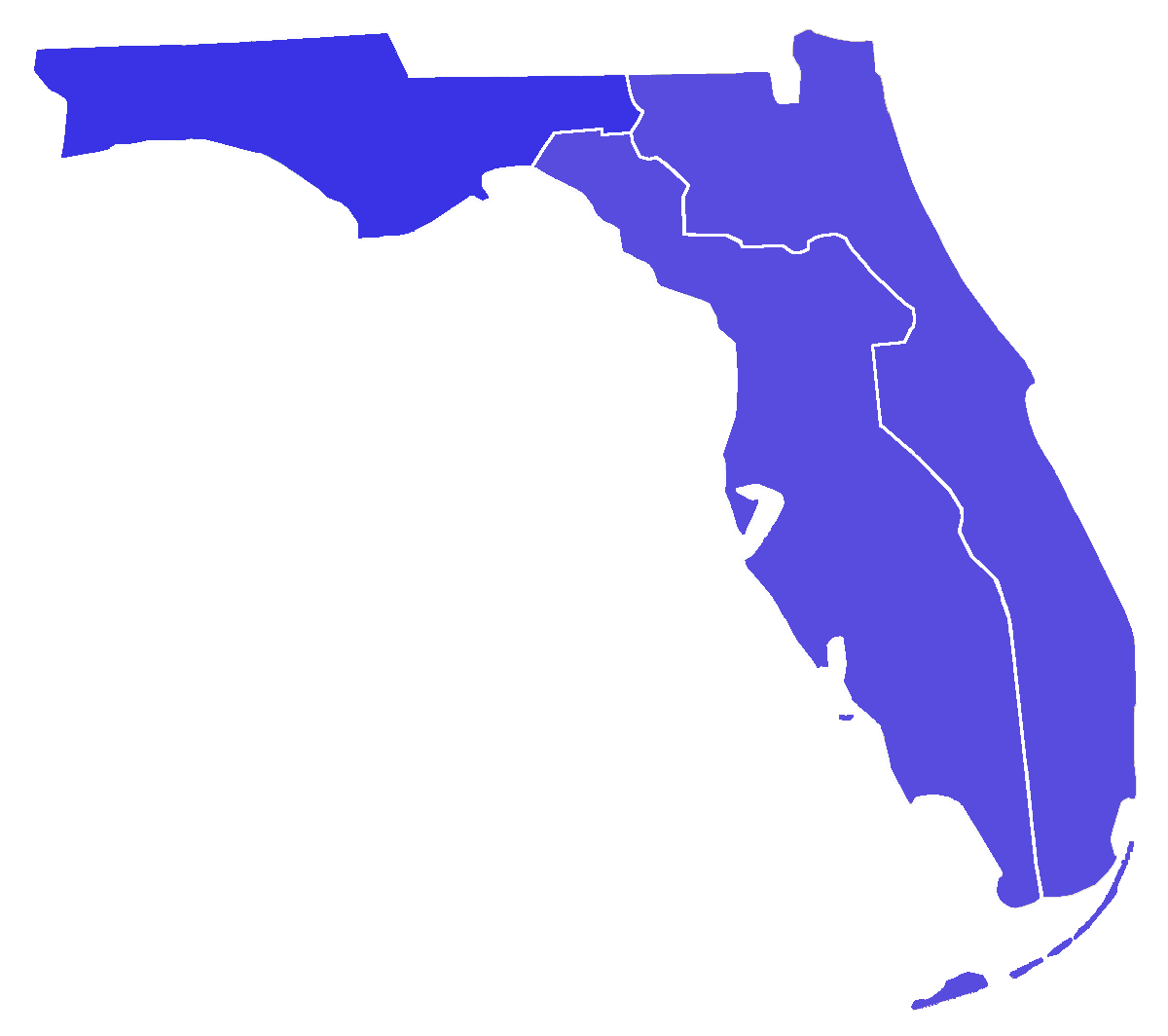
Trammell:
60–70%
70–80%
80–90%
>90%
Governor before election
Albert W. Gilchrist
Democratic
Elected Governor
Park Trammell
Democratic

The 1912 Florida gubernatorial election was held on November 5, 1912. Incumbent Governor Albert W. Gilchrist was term-limited. Democratic nominee Park Trammell was elected with 80.42% of the vote.

== Democratic primary ==
Primary elections were held on April 30, 1912. The Democratic State Committee canvassed the results on May 9.

=== Candidates ===
- Cromwell Gibbons, former Speaker of the Florida House of Representatives
- William Hall Milton, former U.S. Senator
- Edward Manly Semple, attorney
- Park Trammell, incumbent Attorney General of Florida
- John W. Watson, former Speaker of the Florida House of Representatives

=== Results ===
Democratic primary results
Party	Candidate	Votes	%
Democratic	Park Trammell	27,111	44.11
Democratic	William Hall Milton	12,409	20.19
Democratic	John W. Watson	10,760	17.51
Democratic	Cromwell Gibbons	10,306	16.77
Democratic	Edward Manly Semple	878	1.43
Total votes		61,464	100.00

=== Run-off ===
A run-off between the top two candidates was scheduled for May 28. However, on May 10, Milton withdrew, leaving Trammell the nominee.

== General election ==
=== Candidates ===
- J. W. Bingham, Prohibition
- Thomas W. Cox, Socialist, unsuccessful candidate for Florida's 2nd congressional district in 1910
- William C. Hodges, Progressive
- William R. O'Neal, Republican, unsuccessful candidate for Florida's 2nd congressional district in 1908
- Park Trammell, Democratic

=== Results ===
1912 Florida gubernatorial election
Party	Candidate	Votes	%	±%
Democratic	Park Trammell	38,977	80.42%	−1.6%
Socialist	Thomas W. Cox	3,467	7.15%	+1.36
Republican	William R. O'Neal	2,646	5.46%	−9.94
Progressive	William C. Hodges	2,314	4.78%	
Prohibition	J. W. Bingham	1,061	2.19%	
Turnout		48,465	100.00%	
Democratic hold		Swing		

==== County results ====
County	Park M. Trammell Democratic		Thomas W. Cox Socialist		William R. O'Neal Republican		William C. Hodges Progressive		J.W. Bingham Prohibition		Totals
County	#	%	#	%	#	%	#	%	#	%	Totals
Alachua	1,338	83.26%	36	2.24%	152	9.46%	27	1.68%	54	3.36%	1,607
Baker	268	80.72%	18	5.42%	15	4.52%	21	6.33%	10	3.01%	332
Bradford	640	86.25%	6	0.81%	54	7.28%	25	3.37%	17	2.29%	742
Brevard	391	76.52%	58	11.35%	34	6.65%	22	4.31%	6	1.17%	511
Calhoun	475	74.92%	94	14.83%	27	4.26%	18	2.84%	20	3.15%	634
Citrus	423	92.36%	12	2.62%	5	1.09%	16	3.49%	2	0.44%	458
Clay	287	77.99%	38	10.33%	11	2.99%	7	1.90%	25	6.79%	368
Columbia	615	82.88%	20	2.70%	54	7.28%	40	5.39%	13	1.75%	742
Dade	1,352	74.57%	171	9.43%	62	3.42%	188	10.37%	40	2.21%	1,813
DeSoto	886	79.04%	97	8.65%	63	5.62%	44	3.93%	31	2.77%	1,121
Duval	3,628	83.61%	173	3.99%	147	3.39%	313	7.21%	78	1.80%	4,339
Escambia	1,771	85.60%	100	4.83%	61	2.95%	108	5.22%	29	1.40%	2,069
Franklin	251	72.54%	25	7.23%	50	14.45%	20	5.78%	-	0.00%	346
Gadsden	707	93.77%	5	0.66%	29	3.85%	11	1.46%	2	0.27%	754
Hamilton	443	84.54%	34	6.49%	23	4.39%	8	1.53%	16	3.05%	524
Hernando	279	80.64%	37	10.69%	15	4.34%	8	2.31%	7	2.02%	346
Hillsborough	3,023	78.76%	554	14.43%	90	2.34%	104	2.71%	67	1.75%	3,838
Holmes	561	84.23%	46	6.91%	15	2.25%	30	4.50%	14	2.10%	666
Jackson	1,308	81.09%	136	8.43%	86	5.33%	33	2.05%	50	3.10%	1,613
Jefferson	450	88.58%	2	0.39%	24	4.72%	31	6.10%	1	0.20%	508
Lafayette	589	87.00%	40	5.91%	20	2.95%	18	2.66%	10	1.48%	677
Lake	624	83.98%	20	2.69%	67	9.02%	21	2.83%	11	1.48%	743
Lee	472	69.41%	105	15.44%	17	2.50%	67	9.85%	19	2.79%	680
Leon	569	84.17%	4	0.59%	28	4.14%	74	10.95%	1	0.15%	676
Levy	376	83.93%	17	3.79%	32	7.14%	8	1.79%	15	3.35%	448
Liberty	230	86.47%	1	0.38%	26	9.77%	8	3.01%	1	0.38%	266
Madison	505	93.87%	15	2.79%	10	1.86%	7	1.30%	1	0.19%	538
Manatee	776	79.51%	73	7.48%	27	2.77%	64	6.56%	36	3.69%	976
Marion	1,161	80.01%	76	5.24%	101	6.96%	69	4.76%	44	3.03%	1,451
Monroe	836	70.31%	120	10.09%	118	9.92%	84	7.06%	31	2.61%	1,189
Nassau	414	88.84%	9	1.93%	26	5.58%	9	1.93%	8	1.72%	466
Orange	1,265	70.67%	88	4.92%	317	17.71%	69	3.85%	51	2.85%	1,790
Osceola	610	68.69%	25	2.82%	123	13.85%	106	11.94%	24	2.70%	888
Palm Beach	540	74.90%	44	6.10%	28	3.88%	93	12.90%	16	2.22%	721
Pasco	455	72.22%	55	8.73%	62	9.84%	48	7.62%	10	1.59%	630
Pinellas	1,003	75.53%	125	9.41%	44	3.31%	117	8.81%	39	2.94%	1,328
Polk	1,641	80.72%	238	11.71%	56	2.75%	64	3.15%	34	1.67%	2,033
Putnam	800	77.59%	68	6.60%	111	10.77%	26	2.52%	26	2.52%	1,031
Santa Rosa	751	84.67%	68	7.67%	30	3.38%	10	1.13%	28	3.16%	887
St. Johns	788	80.99%	79	8.12%	34	3.49%	58	5.96%	14	1.44%	973
St. Lucie	395	81.28%	48	9.88%	27	5.56%	12	2.47%	4	0.82%	486
Sumter	451	87.23%	8	1.55%	12	2.32%	26	5.03%	20	3.87%	517
Suwannee	820	77.73%	173	16.40%	18	1.71%	20	1.90%	24	2.27%	1,055
Taylor	260	82.54%	7	2.22%	39	12.38%	8	2.54%	1	0.32%	315
Volusia	1,012	75.41%	90	6.71%	133	9.91%	45	3.35%	62	4.62%	1,342
Wakulla	234	83.87%	16	5.73%	20	7.17%	8	2.87%	1	0.36%	279
Walton	906	87.20%	52	5.00%	35	3.37%	39	3.75%	7	0.67%	1,039
Washington	738	70.89%	141	13.54%	59	5.67%	62	5.96%	41	3.94%	1,041
Actual Total	38,317	80.17%	3,467	7.25%	2,646	5.52%	2,314	4.84%	1,061	2.22%	47,796
Official Total	38,977	80.42%	3,467	7.15%	2,646	5.46%	2,314	4.77%	1,061	2.19%	48,465

== Bibliography ==
- Morris, Allen (1965). The Florida Handbook, 1965-66. Tallahassee, FL: The Peninsular Publishing Company.
- Glashan, Roy R. (1979). American Governors and Gubernatorial Elections, 1775-1978. Meckler Books. ISBN 0-930466-17-9.
- Gubernatorial Elections, 1787-1997. Washington, D.C.: Congressional Quarterly Inc. 1998. ISBN 1-56802-396-0.
- Kerber, Stephen (1979). "Chapter 4: The Gubernatorial Contest of 1912: convicts, good roads and sugar". Park Trammell of Florida: A Political Biography (PDF) (Doctor of Philosophy). University of Florida.
