= Park Trammell =

American politician (1876–1936)

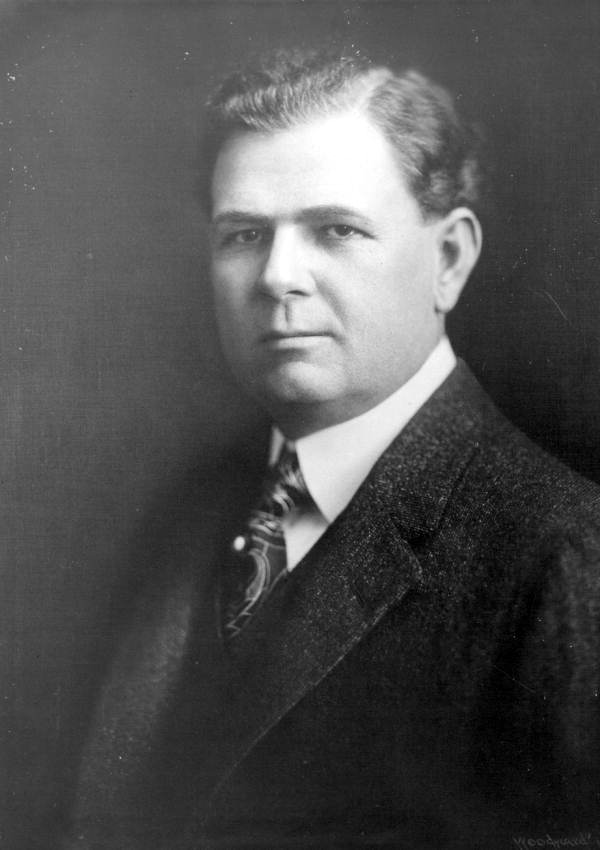

Chair of the Senate Naval Affairs Committee
- In office March 4, 1933 – May 8, 1936
- Preceded by: Frederick Hale
- Succeeded by: David I. Walsh

Chair of the Senate Expenditures in the Treasury Department Committee
- In office March 4, 1917 – March 3, 1919
- Preceded by: Joseph Taylor Robinson
- Succeeded by: M. Hoke Smith

United States Senator from Florida
- In office March 4, 1917 – May 8, 1936
- Preceded by: Nathan P. Bryan
- Succeeded by: Scott M. Loftin

21st Governor of Florida
- In office January 7, 1913 – January 2, 1917
- Preceded by: Albert W. Gilchrist
- Succeeded by: Sidney Johnston Catts

19th Florida Attorney General
- In office January 5, 1909 – January 7, 1913
- Governor: Albert W. Gilchrist
- Preceded by: W. H. Ellis
- Succeeded by: Thomas F. West

President of the Florida Senate
- In office 1905–1907
- Preceded by: Frank Adams
- Succeeded by: W. Hunt Harris

Member of the Florida Senate from the 7th district
- In office 1905–1907
- Preceded by: Charles Cooper Wilson
- Succeeded by: Daniel Henry Sloan

Member of the Florida House of Representatives from the Polk County district
- In office 1903–1905

Mayor of Lakeland, Florida
- In office 1900–1902
- Preceded by: James P. Thompson
- Succeeded by: Samuel L. A. Clonts

Personal details
- Born: April 9, 1876 Macon County, Alabama, US
- Died: May 8, 1936 (aged 60) Washington, D.C., US
- Party: Democratic
- Spouses: Virginia Darby (m. 1900; died 1922) Beatrice Padgett (m. 1934)
- Relatives: Robert Trammell (great nephew)
- Education: Vanderbilt University; Cumberland University
- Occupation: Attorney

Park Monroe Trammell (April 9, 1876 – May 8, 1936) was an American attorney and politician from the state of Florida. Trammell represented Florida in the United States Senate from 1917 until his death in 1936. As chair of the Senate Naval Affairs Committee, Trammell was essential in the creation of several laws that revitalized the United States Navy. Trammell previously served as the governor of Florida and Florida attorney general.

== Early life and education ==
Trammell was born on April 9, 1876, in Macon County, Alabama. When he was a young child, Trammell and his parents moved to a citrus farm near Lakeland, Florida. Trammell attended Vanderbilt University in 1898, before enlisting in the United States Army during the Spanish-American War. Trammell served in the Quartermaster Corps, and was stationed in Tampa, Florida.

After the war, Trammell enrolled at Cumberland University, graduating in 1899. He was admitted into the Florida Bar the same year.

== Early career ==
Trammell, a Democrat, was elected mayor of Lakeland in 1900 and re-elected to a second term in 1901. In 1902, Trammell was elected to the Florida House of Representatives, representing Polk County. He served in the Florida House until 1904, when he was elected to the Florida Senate for Polk County. From 1905 until 1907, Trammell was the President of the Florida Senate. He resigned from the senate the following year, and returned to private practice.

In 1909, Trammell was appointed to serve as the 19th Florida Attorney General by Governor Albert W. Gilchrist.

=== Florida Governor ===
In the 1912 gubernatorial election, Trammell ran to succeed Gilchrist as Governor of Florida. After securing the Democratic nomination, Trammell defeated four other candidates in the general election, receiving 80% of the vote. His closest competitor was Socialist Thomas W. Cox.

As governor, Trammell presided over various labor laws and endorsed a law in the Florida Legislature that would control spending in election campaigns, and also established a state tax commission in order to equalize property assessments across various counties. Trammell's governorship was also known for his blatant racism, endorsing racial segregation and overlooking the lynching of African Americans. While Trammell was state attorney general, none of the 29 lynchings of black men during his term were prosecuted, nor were the 21 that occurred during his governorship.

== United States Senate ==
With the ratification of the Seventeenth Amendment on April 8, 1913, U.S. senators were to be popularly elected, rather than being elected by their state legislatures. Trammell ran for the U.S. Senate in the 1916 election, defeating incumbent Nathan P. Bryan in the Democratic primary. He went on to defeat his Republican opponent, newsman William R. O'Neal, with nearly 83% of the vote.

During his tenure as senator, Trammell was not afraid to deviate from his party. He opposed, for instance, U.S. Supreme Court nominees Harlan F. Stone in 1925 and John J. Parker in 1930, the prior being successfully appointed to the court.

Although previously identified as a liberal, Trammell joined the Conservative Coalition during the Great Depression, a group of conservative congressmen opposed to President Franklin D. Roosevelt's New Deal, claiming it was too liberal, despite his overall support for Roosevelt. Opinions on the New Deal were additionally changing across the South, with many Southern Democrats who initially supported the legislation beginning to vote against it.

In Florida, the test of voters' approval of the New Deal was the Democratic primary of the 1934 U.S. Senate election, in which Trammell, who generally ran unopposed in the primaries, faced the stiffest competition of his entire career. Trammell faced former State Representative Claude Pepper, attorney Charles A. Mitchell, State Senator James F. Sikes, and Florida Democratic Committeewoman Hortense K. Wells. Though the race was mostly a competition between Trammell and Pepper, a social liberal, the latter three candidates pulled enough votes from Trammell to send the race into a runoff election between Trammell and Pepper. Trammell defeated Pepper in the runoff, winning by just a 2% margin. Trammell was unopposed in the general election.

Earlier in 1934, Trammell co-sponsored the Vinson-Trammell Act, along with House Naval Affairs Committee Chair Carl Vinson, which authorized the replacement of obsolete ship by construction of new ships in order to compete with the Japanese Empire.

During his time in the Senate, Trammell was often referred to as the most useless member of the body, having missed 642 out of 3,168 roll call votes across his entire tenure. Despite this, he was still popular among Florida voters.

Trammell was the chairman of the Senate Expenditures in the Treasury Department Committee from 1917 until 1919, and of the Senate Naval Affairs Committee from 1933 until his death in 1936.

== Death and legacy ==
Trammell died at his home in Washington, D.C., on May 8, 1936. He is buried in Lakeland's Roselawn Cemetery.

Trammell's senatorial papers were donated to the Lakeland Public Library and the University of Florida after his death. His gubernatorial papers reside in the Florida State Archives.

In 1955, the Lakeland Public Library building was named the Park Trammell Building. It now houses the Greater Lakeland Chamber of Commerce.

Built in 1955, the Park Trammell Building is a nine-story low-rise building in Tampa, which houses the Greater Tampa Chamber of Commerce.

The Park Trammell Building at the Florida State Mental Hospital in Chattahoochee, Florida, dedicated in 1956, is used to house the geriatric population of the institution.

== Personal life ==
Trammell married Virginia Darby on November 21, 1900. They were married until her death in 1922. He later married Beatrice Padgett, a divorced woman with a son, in 1934. Trammell had no children of his own with either woman.

His great-nephew is Jeffrey Trammell. Trammell was a member of the Freemasons, the Knights of Pythias, and the Woodmen of the World.

== Electoral history ==
1934 United States Senate election in Florida, General election
| Party | Candidate | Votes | % | ±% |
|---|---|---|---|---|
| Democratic | Park Trammell (inc.) | 131,780 | 100.00% | +31.47% |
| Majority | | 131,780 | 100.00% | +62.94% |
| Turnout | | 131,780 | | |
| Democratic hold | | Swing | | |

1934 United States Senate election in Florida, Democratic runoff
| Party | Candidate | Votes | % | ±% |
|---|---|---|---|---|
| Democratic | Park Trammell (inc.) | 103,028 | 51.00% | N/A |
| Democratic | Claude D. Pepper | 98,978 | 49.00% | N/A |
| Majority | | 4,050 | 2.00% | N/A |
| Turnout | | 202,006 | | |

1934 United States Senate election in Florida, Democratic primary
| Party | Candidate | Votes | % | ±% |
|---|---|---|---|---|
| Democratic | Park Trammell (inc.) | 162,642 | 38.02% | N/A |
| Democratic | Claude D. Pepper | 158,792 | 37.12% | N/A |
| Democratic | C. A. Mitchell | 60,910 | 14.24% | N/A |
| Democratic | James F. Sikes | 29,116 | 6.81% | N/A |
| Democratic | Hortense K. Wells | 16,334 | 3.82% | N/A |
| Majority | | 1,925 | 0.90% | N/A |
| Turnout | | 427,794 | | |

1928 United States Senate election in Florida, General election
| Party | Candidate | Votes | % | ±% |
|---|---|---|---|---|
| Democratic | Park Trammell (inc.) | 153,816 | 68.53% | −19.74% |
| Republican | Barclay H. Warburton | 70,633 | 31.47% | N/A |
| Majority | | 83,183 | 37.06% | −39.48% |
| Turnout | | 224,449 | | |
| Democratic hold | | Swing | | |

1928 United States Senate election in Florida, Democratic primary
| Party | Candidate | Votes | % | ±% |
|---|---|---|---|---|
| Democratic | Park Trammell (inc.) | 138,534 | 57.97% | N/A |
| Democratic | John W. Martin | 100,454 | 42.03% | N/A |
| Majority | | 38,080 | 15.93% | N/A |
| Turnout | | 238,988 | | N/A |

1922 United States Senate election in Florida
| Party | Candidate | Votes | % | ±% |
|---|---|---|---|---|
| Democratic | Park Trammell (inc.) | 45,707 | 88.27% | +5.41% |
| Independent Republican | W. C. Lawson | 6,074 | 11.73% | N/A |
| Majority | | 39,633 | 76.54% | +6.13% |
| Turnout | | 51,781 | | |
| Democratic hold | | Swing | | |

1916 United States Senate election in Florida
| Party | Candidate | Votes | % | ±% |
|---|---|---|---|---|
| Democratic | Park Trammell | 58,391 | 82.86% | N/A |
| Republican | William R. O'Neal | 8,774 | 12.45% | N/A |
| Socialist | R. L. Goodwin | 3,304 | 4.69% | N/A |
| Majority | | 49,617 | 70.41% | N/A |
| Turnout | | 70,469 | | |
| Democratic hold | | Swing | | |

1912 Florida gubernatorial election
| Party | Candidate | Votes | % | ±% |
|---|---|---|---|---|
| Democratic | Park Trammell | 77,954 | 80.42% | +1.61% |
| Socialist | Thomas W. Cox | 6,934 | 7.15% | +1.36% |
| Republican | William R. O'Neal | 5,292 | 5.46% | −9.94% |
| Progressive | William C. Hodges | 4,628 | 4.78% | N/A |
| Prohibition | J. W. Bingham | 2,122 | 2.19% | N/A |
| Majority | | 35,510 | 73.27% | +9.85% |
| Turnout | | 96,930 | | |
| Democratic hold | | Swing | | |

== See also ==
- Vinson–Trammell Act
- List of members of the United States Congress who died in office (1900–1949)

Party political offices
| Preceded by Albert W. Gilchrist | Democratic nominee for Governor of Florida; 1912 | Succeeded by William V. Knott |
| First | Democratic nominee for U.S. Senator from Florida (Class 1); 1916, 1922, 1928, 1934 | Succeeded by Charles O. Andrews |
Legal offices
| Preceded by W. H. Ellis | Attorney General of Florida; 1909–1913 | Succeeded by Thomas F. West |
Political offices
| Preceded by Albert W. Gilchrist | Governor of Florida; January 7, 1913 – January 2, 1917 | Succeeded by Sidney J. Catts |
U.S. Senate
| Preceded by Nathan P. Bryan | United States Senator (Class 1) from Florida; 1917–1936 | Succeeded by Scott Loftin |
