= 1910 Georgia gubernatorial election =

- October 5, 1910
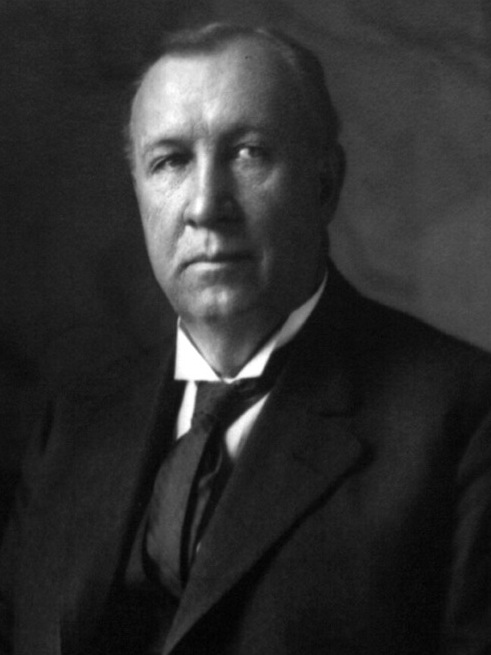

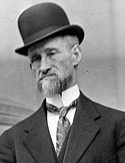
Nominee	Hoke Smith	Joseph Mackey Brown
Party	Democratic	Independent Democrat
Popular vote	95,000	17,000
Percentage	84.77%	15.17%
- County results (Note: incomplete returns); Smith: 50–60% 60–70% 70–80% 80–90% >90% Brown: 50–60% 70–80% No data
Governor before election
Joseph Mackey Brown
Democratic
Elected Governor
Hoke Smith
Democratic

The 1910 Georgia gubernatorial election was held on October 5, 1910, in order to elect the Governor of Georgia. Democratic nominee and former Governor Hoke Smith defeated Independent Democratic candidate and incumbent Governor Joseph Mackey Brown and Socialist Party nominee C. O. Brown.

== Democratic primary ==
The Democratic primary election was held in 1910. Former Governor of Georgia Hoke Smith received a majority of the votes (51.10%), and was thus elected as the nominee for the general election over incumbent Governor Joseph Mackey Brown, who instead decided to run as an independent.

=== Results ===
1910 Democratic gubernatorial primary
Party	Candidate	Votes	%
Democratic	Hoke Smith	97,989	51.10%
Democratic	Joseph Mackey Brown (incumbent)	93,734	48.90%
Total votes		191,723	100.00%

== General election ==
On election day, October 5, 1910, Democratic nominee Hoke Smith won re-election with a margin of 78,000 votes against his foremost opponent Independent Democratic candidate Joseph Mackey Brown, thereby holding Democratic control over the office of Governor. Smith was sworn in for his second term on July 1, 1911.

=== Results ===
Georgia gubernatorial election, 1910
Party	Candidate	Votes	%
Democratic	Hoke Smith	95,000	84.77
Independent Democrat	Joseph Mackey Brown (incumbent)	17,000	15.17
Socialist	C. O. Brown	71	0.06
Total votes		112,071	100.00
Democratic hold			
