= Andrew Jackson Pettigrew =

American politician (1845–1917)

Member of the Florida House of Representatives from Manatee County
- In office 1907–1909
- Preceded by: Arthur Temple Cornwell
- Succeeded by: Arthur Floyd Hull

Personal details
- Born: June 1845
- Died: December 18, 1917 (aged 72)
- Party: Socialist
- Profession: Politician
- Known for: Only socialist to serve in the Florida Legislature

Andrew Jackson Pettigrew (June 1845 − December 18, 1917) was an American politician and a member of the Florida House of Representatives from 1907 to 1909. Pettigrew a socialist who served in the Florida Legislature. He served in the 1907 session. He was the only socialist to serve until 2026, when Ashley Hermann was elected to Florida House District 69.

Jackson was born June 1845 and raised in Brown County, Illinois for a time. During his teenage years, his family moved to Kansas. Pettigrew himself relocated to Manatee County, Florida in 1883. He took work as a farm laborer on a citrus farm before earning enough wealth to purchase forty acres of his own land on which to farm. He became involved with the citrus trade in Florida. An avowed socialist, Pettigrew ran for the Florida House of Representatives in 1904 as a member of the Socialist Party of Florida against Democratic candidate A.J. Cornwall. He ran again in 1906 against Democratic candidate John Graham. While a member of the House, he introduced bills to implement an income tax, the direct election of United States Senators, and reforming juries to a majority-vote system versus the existing unanimous vote system. In 1908, the Florida Socialist Party nominated Pettigrew as its candidate for Governor of Florida in that year's gubernatorial election. He outperformed the Republican nominee in several areas of the state, but finished third to Democratic nominee Albert W. Gilchrist and Republican nominee John Cheney. In 1912, Pettigrew was the Socialist Party's candidate for Florida Commissioner of Agriculture finishing second to the Democratic nominee and defeating the Republican nominee that year.

Pettigrew died December 18, 1917, at age 72.
