= 1908 Georgia gubernatorial election =

- October 7, 1908
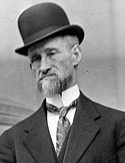

Nominee	Joseph Mackey Brown	Yancy Carter
Party	Democratic	Independent
Popular vote	112,292	11,746
Percentage	90.53%	9.47%
- County results Brown: 50–60% 60–70% 70–80% 80–90% >90% No data
Governor before election
Hoke Smith
Democratic
Elected Governor
Joseph Mackey Brown
Democratic

The 1908 Georgia gubernatorial election was held on October 7, 1908, in order to elect the Governor of Georgia. Democratic nominee Joseph Mackey Brown defeated Independent candidate Yancy Carter in a landslide.

== Democratic primary ==
The Democratic primary election was held on June 13, 1908. Candidate Joseph Mackey Brown received a majority of the votes (52.60%), and was thus elected as the nominee for the general election over incumbent Governor Hoke Smith.

=== Results ===
1908 Democratic gubernatorial primary
Party	Candidate	Votes	%
Democratic	Joseph Mackey Brown	109,806	52.60%
Democratic	Hoke Smith (incumbent)	98,949	47.40%
Total votes		208,755	100.00%

== General election ==
On election day, October 7, 1908, Democratic nominee Joseph Mackey Brown won the election with a margin of 100,546 votes against his opponent Independent candidate Yancy Carter, thereby holding Democratic control over the office of Governor. Brown was sworn in as the 59th Governor of Georgia on June 26, 1909.

=== Results ===
Georgia gubernatorial election, 1908
Party	Candidate	Votes	%
Democratic	Joseph Mackey Brown	112,292	90.53
Independent	Yancy Carter	11,746	9.47
Total votes		124,038	100.00
Democratic hold			
