= 1912 United States elections =

- ← 1910 1911 1912 1913 1914 → Presidential election year
- Election day: November 5
- Incumbent president: ▌William Howard Taft (R)
- Next Congress: 63rd

Presidential election
- Partisan control: Democratic gain
- Popular vote margin: Democratic +14.4%
- Electoral vote
- Woodrow Wilson (D): 435
- Theodore Roosevelt (P): 88
- William Howard Taft (R): 8
- 1912 presidential election results. Red denotes states won by Taft, blue denotes states won by Wilson, and light green denotes states won by Roosevelt. Numbers indicate the electoral votes won by each candidate.

Senate elections
- Overall control: Democratic gain
- Seats contested: 32 of 96 seats
- Net seat change: Democratic +4
- 1912 Senate results Democratic gain Democratic hold Republican gain Republican hold

House elections
- Overall control: Democratic hold
- Seats contested: All 435 voting members
- Net seat change: Democratic +62
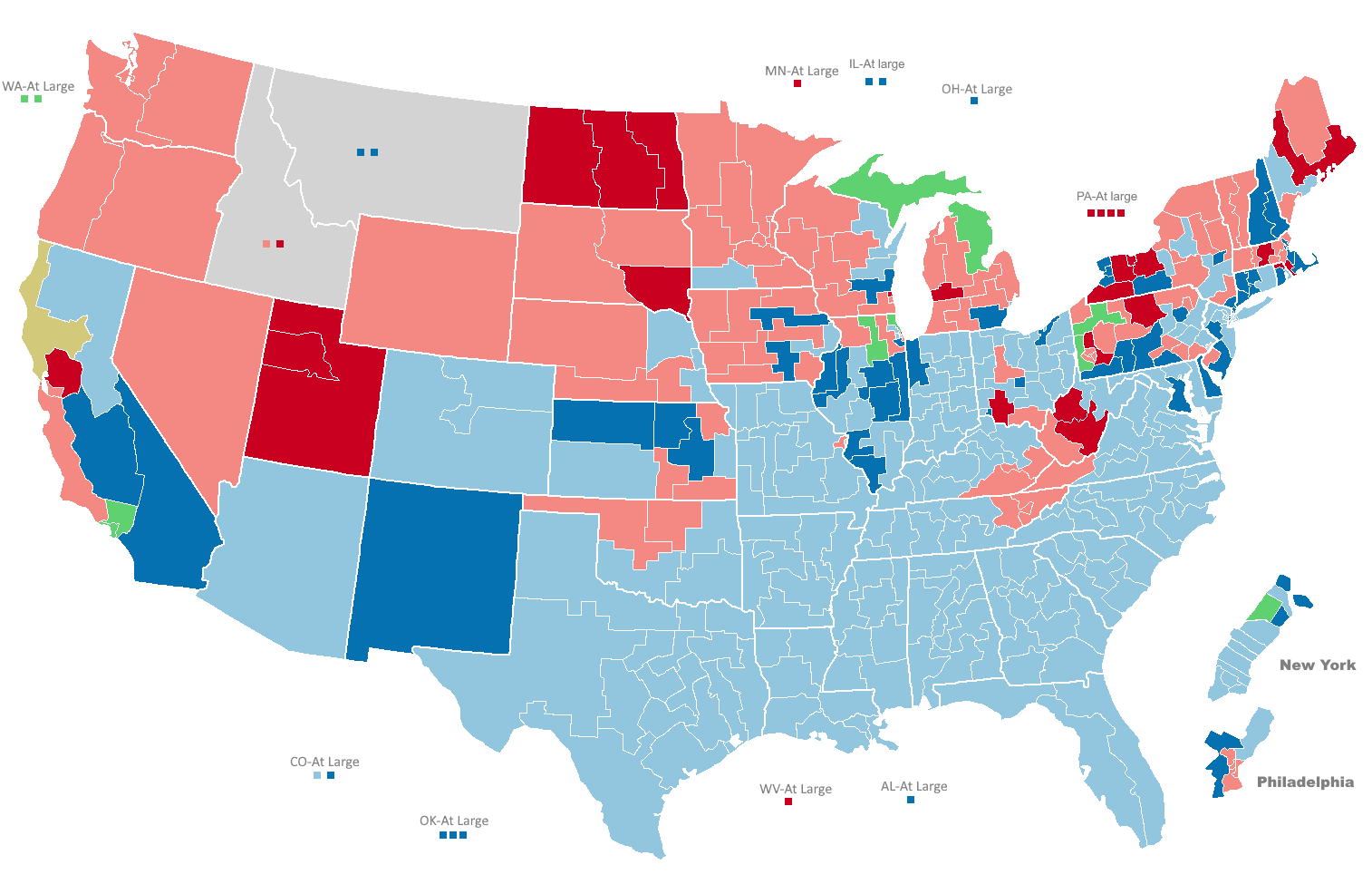
- 1912 House of Representatives results

Gubernatorial elections
- Seats contested: 33
- Net seat change: Democratic +4
- 1912 gubernatorial election results Democratic gain Democratic hold Republican gain Republican hold

Elections were held for the 63rd United States Congress, occurring during the Fourth Party System. Amidst a division between the incumbent Republican president William Howard Taft and the former Republican president Theodore Roosevelt, the Democratic Party won the presidency and both chambers of Congress, the first time they accomplished that feat since the 1892 elections.

In the presidential election, the Democratic governor Woodrow Wilson of New Jersey defeated the Republican President William Howard Taft and former president and Progressive Party nominee Theodore Roosevelt. Socialist union leader Eugene Debs, running his fourth campaign, took six percent of the vote. At the 1912 Democratic National Convention, Wilson took the nomination on the 46th ballot, defeating Speaker Champ Clark and several other candidates. Roosevelt left the Republican Party after an unsuccessful challenge to Taft at the 1912 Republican National Convention. Though Wilson carried just over 40% of the popular vote, he dominated the electoral college and won a greater share of the electoral vote than any candidate since Ulysses S. Grant in 1872. Wilson's election made him the first Democratic president since Grover Cleveland. Roosevelt's candidacy finished second in the popular vote and the electoral college, the only time a third party candidate accomplished either feat.

Following the 1910 census, 41 seats were added to the House, setting the House at its current number of 435 seats. Democrats made major gains in the House, further strengthening their majority, while the new Progressive Party won ten seats.

In the last Senate election before the ratification of the 17th Amendment, Democrats made moderate gains and won control of the chamber for the first time since the 1892 election.

== See also ==
- 1912 United States presidential election
- 1912 United States House of Representatives elections
- 1912–13 United States Senate elections
- 1912 United States gubernatorial elections
