= Jeffrey Trammell =

Lobbyist and communications and public affairs consultant

Jeffrey B. Trammell
- Born: January 13, 1950 (age 76)
- Education: College of William & Mary (BA); Florida State University (JD)
- Occupations: Political consultant, higher education official
- Employer(s): Trammell & Company
- Title: Rector of the College of William & Mary
- Predecessor: Henry C. Wolf
- Successor: Todd Stottlemyer
- Political party: Democratic
- Spouse: Stuart Serkin (2013–present)

Jeffrey Bevis Trammell (born January 13, 1950) is an American public affairs consultant and higher education official. He has served as an advisor to U.S. presidential candidates and as Rector of the College of William & Mary.

== Early life ==
Trammell is originally from Blountstown, Florida, where he was a standout athlete, leading his basketball team to the state championship and being named High School All-American. He attended the College of William & Mary on a basketball scholarship. He served as captain of the men's basketball team, and as a junior in 1971–72 he was named to the all-Southern Conference second team. Trammell graduated in 1973 with a BA in history, then received his J.D. from Florida State University in 1976.

== Career ==
Trammell served on the staff of the United States House of Representatives and United States Senate. Over the course of his career, Trammell has worked on the presidential campaigns of Al Gore, John Kerry and Hillary Clinton. In 2001, he founded Trammell & Company, a Washington, D.C.–based public affairs firm, having previously been senior managing director for Hill & Knowlton. Along with Congressman Barney Frank and attorney Chad S. Johnson, he helped found the National Stonewall Democrats. He chaired the Gay and Lesbian Victory Fund and served on the boards of the Human Rights Campaign and the U.S. Holocaust Memorial Museum's Gay and Lesbian Victims Remembrance Project.

From 2011 to 2013, Trammell served as the Rector (Chair) of the Board of Visitors of the College of William & Mary. He was initially appointed to the board in 2005 by Mark Warner and reappointed in 2009 by Tim Kaine. He was the first openly gay board chair of a major public university in the country. As rector, Trammell led a reinvention of the university's financial model, called The William & Mary Promise, to protect its longterm future. He also was outspoken in his efforts to persuade the Virginia government to allow the state's public universities to provide benefits to same-sex partners of employees.

He served on the Virginia Commission on Higher Education Board Appointments, the board of trustees of the Association of Governing Boards of Colleges and Universities and on the board of advisors of the Institute of Human Virology of the University of Maryland Medical School. He also chairs the board of the Harriman Fellows which provides embassy internships for promising U.S. students of international diplomacy. He is on the editorial board of Trusteeship magazine, where he has published articles on the value of liberal arts and the challenges of LGBT diversity.

== Personal life ==
Trammell is the great-nephew of Park Trammell, a Florida politician who served as governor and US senator. He married Stuart Serkin, whom he met in 1977 while taking the Florida bar examination, on October 29, 2013, at the United States Supreme Court. Former Supreme Court Justice Sandra Day O'Connor presided over his wedding. It is believed to be the second same-sex marriage performed in the Supreme Court building.
