= Socialist Party of Florida =

- SPFL
- Chairperson: State Executive Committee
- Founded: 1902
- Headquarters: Zephyrhills, FL
- Ideology: Democratic socialism
- National affiliation: Socialist Party USA
- Colors: Red
- Seats in the Upper House: 0 / 40
- Seats in the Lower House: 0 / 40

Website
- spflorida.blogspot.com

The Socialist Party of Florida (SPFL) is the Florida state chapter of the Socialist Party USA, a democratic socialist party. The SPFL appeared on ballots during the 2012 US presidential election in Florida and 2014 Florida gubernatorial election. It is no longer a registered political party in the state.

== History and political activity ==
=== 1901–1920 ===
==== Establishment ====
The first Socialist Party of America (SPA) local in Florida was founded in Orlando on November 18, 1901, a few months after the national party was founded. The original Socialist Party of Florida was founded as a part of the SPA, in July 1902. By 1904, it had more than fifty chapters. In July and August of that year county chapters in Manatee, Hillsborough and Duval would nominate candidates for local office who would all run without success. The state party would hold its first convention in Orlando sometime during the first week of July 1904 nominating several candidates to run governor and cabinet positions. During the early 1900s, the Socialist Party in Florida would be impacted by Jim Crow as African-American members were required to be members of their own local chapter separate from white ones or in the case there was an insufficient amount they would be members of the state party directly.

==== Election of Andrew Pettigrew in Manatee County ====
During the 1906 elections, Manatee County would unexpectedly elect Andrew Jackson Pettigrew who was running under the Socialist Party as state representative defeating John A. Graham. Pettigrew had previously ran in 1904 for the same position but was unsuccessful. He had also previously served as the chairman of the Manatee County Socialist Party. During Pettigrew's campaign, journalist Claude L'Engle from the Florida Sun would question Graham's activities in Northern Florida which would end up benefitting Pettigrew at the expense of Graham. L'Engle accused him of swindling several people in several articles published in June and July 1906 which resulted in Graham filing a lawsuit in a circuit court for libel demanding $30,000 on August 2. L'Engle ended up endorsing Pettigrew that month and said voters in Manatee County should shy away from Graham.

==== 1908 elections ====
After the 1906 elections the party would generally be optimistic for 1908. A second convention would be held in Tampa on July 4, 1908. Sixty delegates would attend with at least one coming from each of Florida's counties. The party would select its nominees for every state level office with the exception of the Attorney General. The convention would also select candidates to run its three congressional districts along with five electoral college members. Mrs. S. F. J. Linn who was the party's nominee for Superintendent of Schools that year would be the first female candidate to appear on the ballot in a state level race. She would also receive the highest percentage the Socialist Party would ever manage to achieve at 10.4% for a race at the state level.

==== St. Augustine 1913 municipal elections and inroads in surrounding areas ====
During the summer of 1913 the party contested St. Augustine's municipal elections, getting close to winning positions in the municipal government during a contentious campaign with the Democratic Party but ended up losing by only forty-eight votes. Nominees were: David L. Dunham for mayor, T.J. Speisseger, Candido Meitin for an unknown position and Edgar Manucy for municipal judge. All of the party's nominees came from prominent families in the city and the rest of the party's support came from members of the city's working class. Socialists in St. Augustine showed less consideration for issues of race, ethnicity and class although the city overall was described as having an intense racial, ethnic and religious hierarchy to it. They would find more success in Longwood and Hastings which was located nearby where the party would elected justices of the peace for both locations.

==== Attempts to establish a newspaper ====
A newspaper aligned with the party named Florida Beacon would also be launched in 1913 but only lasted for less than a year before it went bankrupt. Another attempt would be made to establish a newspaper for the party named Slege Hammer but it would end up facing the same issues that the Florida Beacon would have. Socialists in Florida would have the same difficulties that were faced at the national level when it came to establishing a media organ for them.

==== Decline of the party ====
The party overall would begin to decline starting in 1917 with the United States' entry into World War I which ended up significantly hurting the party as many saw them as being traitors for not supporting the war effort. With the Russian Revolution occurring in November, much of the public nationally would turn against them. Federal and state officials would increase monitoring in Florida as a result with an emphasis being made on Tampa's Ybor City and West Tampa neighborhoods. By 1920 the party would become virtually irrelevant politically.

=== 1920–present ===
The Socialist Party of America voted 73:34 to change its name to Social Democrats, USA in December 1972. SPUSA was founded in 1973, after which the SPFL was founded on March 16, 1998.

The SPFL became inactive in about June 2011 and on December 20, 2011, the Florida Division of Elections revoked the status of the SPFL as a registered party in the State of Florida.

While the party was primarily an activist organization, it was also an official minor party in Florida, which enabled it to field candidates for office. The SPFL ran candidates for president in 2000 (David McReynolds) and 2004 (Walt Brown). In 2006, the SPFL attempted to field a write-in candidate for governor, but failed to gain eligibility. SPFL member Brian Moore was nominated to run for President in 2008 by the SP national convention. In 2010, SPFL member, David Maynard, was elected to the Hillsborough County Soil and Water Conservation Board.

The SPFL had locals in the county of Broward and the Tampa Bay Area.

== Platform ==
The SPFL is a democratic socialist organization. In 2004, the party described its position as:

We believe the economy should be transformed into a socialist economy that is publicly owned and democratically controlled. The production of goods and services are created by the people and the benefits should be shared by everyone equitably. Our economy should focus on meeting people's basic needs such as healthcare, education, food and shelter, rather than profits. A small percent of the public controls our resources and political power, while the rest of society is oppressed and excluded. Discrimination on the basis of race/ethnicity, gender, age, class, religion, ability/disability and sexual orientation prohibits us from working cooperatively for the benefit of the community.

The SPFL endorsed the positions of anti-racism and socialist feminism, saying:

As socialist-feminists, we differ from both those on the left who fail to recognize feminism as an essential aspect of human liberation, and from those parts of the feminist movement that believe that women's liberation can be achieved without a fundamental change in the economic system... We support independent organization by people of color to fight oppression. Racism will not be eliminated merely by eliminating capitalism.

In the "Principles of the Socialist Party", the party says that it considers a socialist planned economy a way to solve ecological crises. The SPFL endorses full employment and cooperatives.

The SPFL was involved in the anti-war movements around Iraq and Afghanistan, working on behalf of the Coalition of Immokalee Workers, and opposing the anti gay marriage amendment effort. In addition, the SPFL worked on bringing a lawsuit against the State of Florida over violations of minor parties' First Amendment rights.

== Elected officials ==
Formerly and currently elected Florida Socialists:

- Andrew Jackson Pettigrew, State Representative, Manatee County, 1907–1909
- John Dobler, Mayor, Gulfport, 1909–1911
- James Love, Mayor, Lake Worth, 1914–1916
- David Maynard, Hillsborough County Soil & Water Conservation Board, Seat 5 2010-

== Candidates for office ==
=== Gubernatorial candidates ===
- 1908 — Andrew Jackson Pettigrew
- 1912 — Thomas Cox
- 1916 — C. C. Allen
- 1920 — Dr. Furman Whitaker

=== U.S. Senate candidates ===
- 1916 — R. L. Goodwin
- 1920 — M. J. Martin

=== U.S. House candidates ===
1904

- 2nd district — W. B Wood
- 3rd district — George S. Smith

1906

- 1st district — C. C. Allen
- 3rd district — T. B. Meeker

1908

- 1st district — C. C. Allen
- 2nd district — A. N. Jackson
- 3rd district — C. N. Wood

1910

- 1st district — C. C. Allen
- 2nd district — Thomas W. Cox
- 3rd district — Eric Vonaxelson

1912

- 1st district — C. C. Allen
- 2nd district — J. J. Collins
- 3rd district — W. N. Lamberry
- At-large — A. N. Jackson

1916

- 1st district — Frank L. Sullivan
- 4th district — A. N. Jackson

1920

- 1st district — C. W. Smith
- 2nd district — W. L. Case
- 4th district — Earl Hunt

2008

- 20th district — Marc Luzietti

== Election results ==
=== State offices ===
==== Gubernatorial results ====
Year	Nominee	Votes	
Year	Nominee	#	%
1904	W.R. Healey	1,270	3.47%
1908	A.J. Pettigrew	2,427	5.79%
1912	Thomas W. Cox	3,467	7.15%
1916	C.C. Allen	2,470	2.98%
1920	F.C. Whitaker	2,823	2.13%

=== Federal offices ===
==== Presidential results ====
Since 1976, the Socialist Party USA has run a candidate for President of the United States. The party's nominee has been on the ballot in Florida in each election since 2000. The candidate who has received the highest vote total in Florida under the Socialist Party USA and nationally was former Oregon State Senator Walt Brown.

Year	Nominee	Votes
1904	Eugene V. Debs	2,337 (5.95%)
1908	Eugene V. Debs	3,747 (7.59%)
1912	Eugene V. Debs	4,806 (9.45%)
1916	Allan L. Benson	5,353 (6.63%)
1920	Eugene V. Debs	5,189 (3.56%)
1976	Frank Zeidler (write-in)	8 (0%)
1980	David McReynolds (write-in)	212 (0.01%)
1984	Sonia Johnson (write-in)	58 (0%)
1988	Willa Kenoyer (write-in)	14 (0%)
1992	J. Quinn Brisben (write-in)	16 (0%)
1996	Mary Cal Hollis (write-in)	21 (0%)
2000	David McReynolds	622 (0.01%)
2004	Walt Brown	3,502 (0.05%)
2008	Brian Moore	405 (0%)
2012	Stewart Alexander	799 (.01%)
2016	Mimi Soltysik	NA

==== U.S. Senate ====
Year	Nominee	Votes	
Year	Nominee	#	%
1916	R. L. Goodwin	3,304	4.69%
1920	M. J. Martin	3,525	2.48%

==== U.S. House ====
Year	District	Nominee	Votes	
Year	District	Nominee	#	%
1904	District 2	W.B. Wood	404	2.91%
1904	District 3	George S. Smith	222	2.89%
1906	District 3	T.B. Meeker	384	6.62%
1908	District 1	C.C. Allen	1,297	9.78%
1908	District 2	A.N. Jackson	862	6.10%
1910	District 1	C.C. Allen	2,346	18.23%
1910	District 2	Thomas W. Cox	1,804	12.19%
1910	District 3	Eric Vonaxelson	1,032	10.45%
1912	District 1	C.C. Allen	1,901	12.04%
1912	District 2	J.J. Collins	1,318	7.31%
1912	District 3	W.N. Lamberry	659	6.29%
1916	District 1	C.C. Allen	1,158	6.20%
1916	District 4	A.N. Jackson	1,592	7.44%
1920	District 1	C.W. White	1,074	3.18%
1920	District 2	W.L. Case	312	1.75%
1920	District 4	Earl Hunt	2,019	3.92%

== Logos ==
The Socialist Party of Florida near the end of its life had four official logos. The linked hands over the world is the official logo of the Socialist Party USA, while the red carnation is the former logo of the SPUSA. The use of both logos was approved by the State Executive Committee of the SPFL in July 2007. In May, 2008, the SEC approved the use of the Red Star Over Florida. In February, 2010, the SEC approved yet another new logo, based on the linked hands over the world and the red star over Florida.

== Notes ==
1.Despite the Socialist Party of Florida becoming inactive in 2011, Maynard is apparently still a member of the Socialist Party USA, and in office as of the fall of 2016.
