= 1908 Florida gubernatorial election =

- November 3, 1908
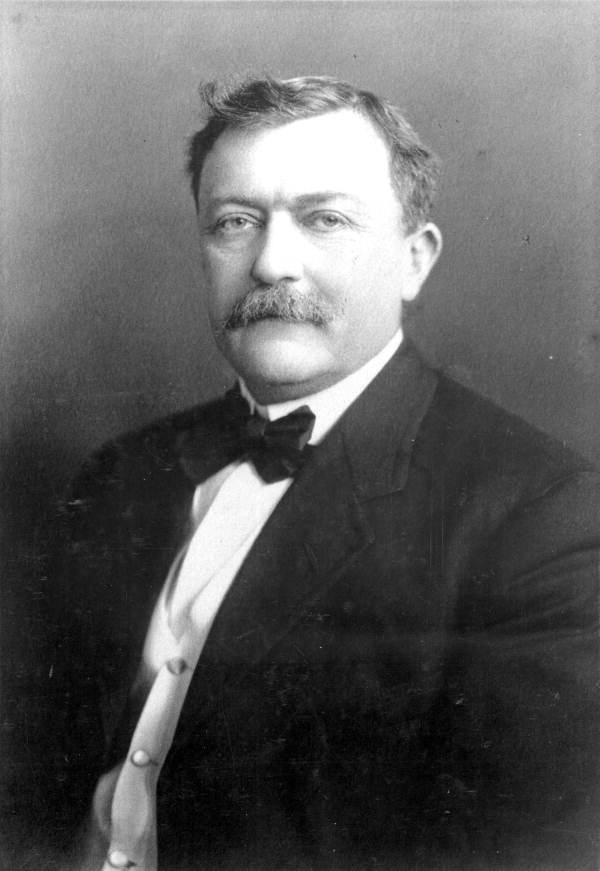

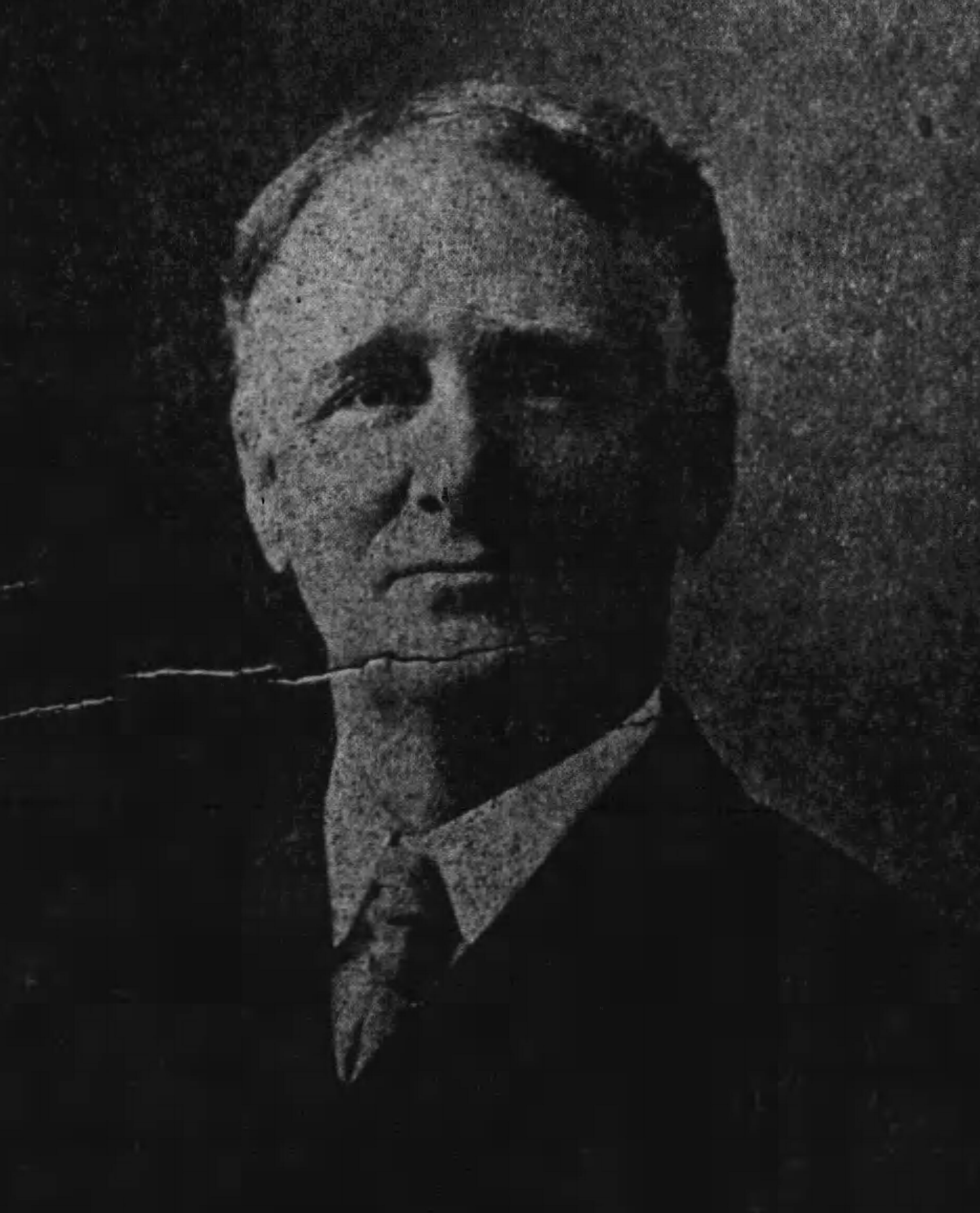

Nominee	Albert W. Gilchrist	John M. Cheney	Andrew Pettigrew
Party	Democratic	Republican	Socialist
Popular vote	33,036	6,453	2,427
Percentage	78.82%	15.40%	5.79%

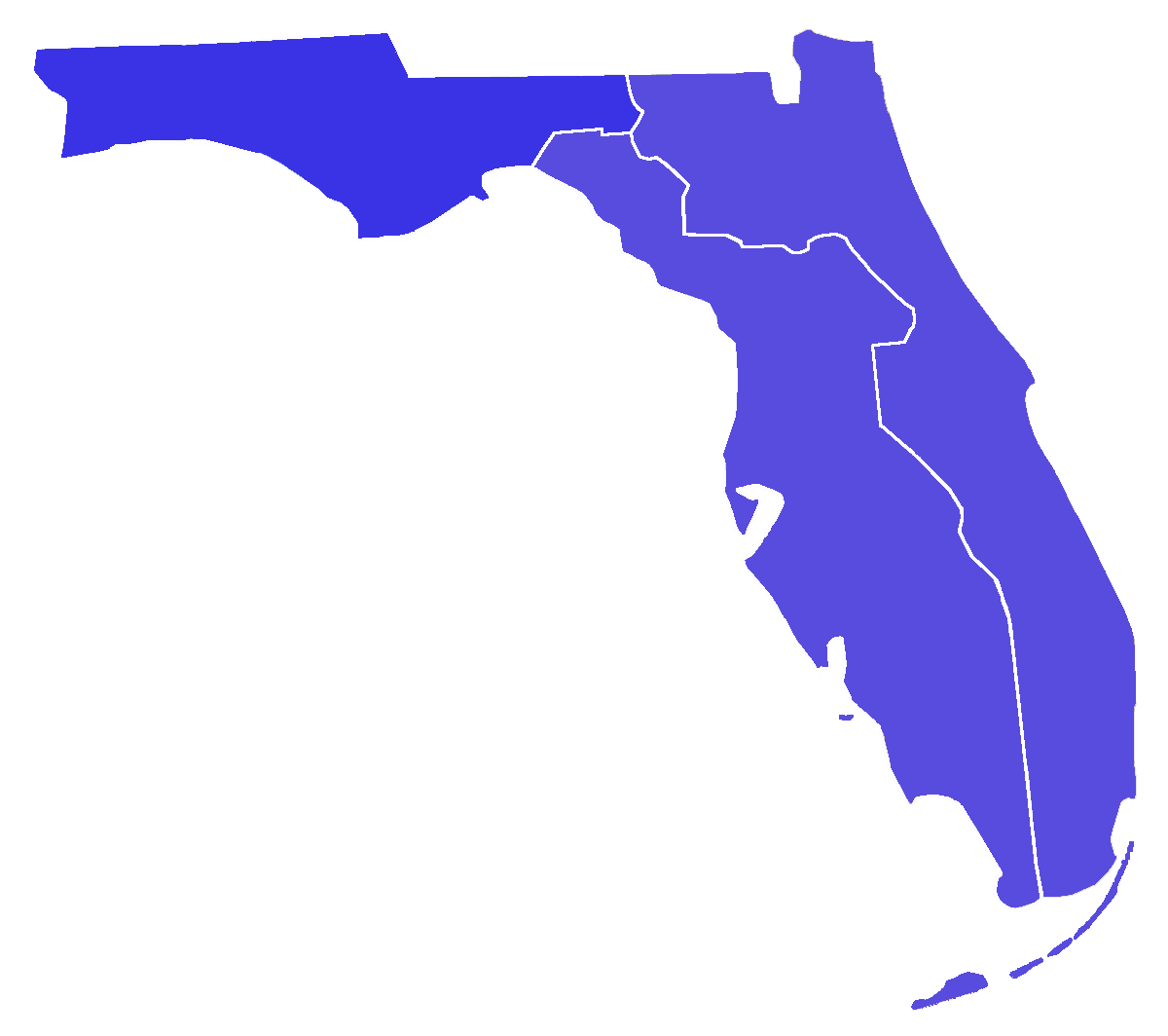
Gilchrist:
60–70%
70–80%
80–90%
>90%
Governor before election
Napoleon B. Broward
Democratic
Elected Governor
Albert W. Gilchrist
Democratic

The 1908 Florida gubernatorial election was held on November 3, 1908. Incumbent Governor Napoleon B. Broward was term-limited. Democratic nominee Albert W. Gilchrist was elected with 78.82% of the vote.

== Democratic primary ==
Primary elections were held on May 19, 1908, with the Democratic runoff held on June 16, 1908.

=== Candidates ===
- Jefferson B. Browne, President of the Florida Senate
- Albert W. Gilchrist, former State Representative
- John N. C. Stockton, former state legislator

=== Results ===
Democratic primary results
Party	Candidate	Votes	%
Democratic	Albert W. Gilchrist	23,248	44.45
Democratic	John N. C. Stockton	20,068	38.37
Democratic	Jefferson B. Browne	8,986	17.18
Total votes		52,302	100.00

Democratic primary run-off results
Party	Candidate	Votes	%
Democratic	Albert W. Gilchrist	32,465	58.23
Democratic	John N. C. Stockton	23,291	41.77
Total votes		55,756	100.00

== General election ==
=== Candidates ===
- John M. Cheney, Republican, United States Attorney for the Southern District of Florida
- Albert W. Gilchrist, Democratic
- Andrew Jackson Pettigrew, Socialist, State Representative for Manatee County.

=== Results ===
1908 Florida gubernatorial election
Party	Candidate	Votes	%	±%
Democratic	Albert W. Gilchrist	33,036	78.82%	−0.34%
Republican	John M. Cheney	6,453	15.40%	+1.97%
Socialist	A. J. Pettigrew	2,427	5.79%	+2.5%
Turnout		41,916	100.00%	
Democratic hold		Swing		

==== Results by county ====
County	Albert W. Gilchrist Democratic		John M. Cheney Republican		Andrew Pettigrew Socialist		Total Votes
County	#	%	#	%	#	%	Total Votes
Alachua	1,260	74.64%	394	23.34%	34	2.01%	1,688
Baker	258	76.79%	44	13.10%	34	10.12%	336
Bradford	710	85.44%	101	12.15%	20	2.41%	831
Brevard	283	60.60%	141	30.19%	43	9.21%	467
Calhoun	452	76.87%	128	21.77%	8	1.36%	588
Citrus	378	94.50%	14	3.50%	8	2.00%	400
Clay	317	78.47%	76	18.81%	11	2.72%	404
Columbia	552	76.45%	159	22.02%	11	1.52%	722
Dade	1,134	83.94%	180	13.32%	37	2.74%	1,351
DeSoto	1,141	82.68%	129	9.35%	110	7.97%	1,380
Duval	2,373	83.67%	383	13.50%	80	2.82%	2,836
Escambia	2,240	78.96%	466	16.43%	131	4.62%	2,837
Franklin	278	68.81%	101	25.00%	25	6.19%	404
Gadsden	589	95.77%	17	2.76%	9	1.46%	615
Hamilton	434	76.54%	84	14.81%	49	8.64%	567
Hernando	278	86.34%	22	6.83%	22	6.83%	322
Hillsborough	2,840	79.60%	352	9.87%	376	10.54%	3,568
Holmes	576	77.63%	117	15.77%	49	6.60%	742
Jackson	1,174	79.32%	202	13.65%	104	7.03%	1,480
Jefferson	566	83.24%	113	16.62%	1	0.15%	680
Lafayette	467	87.13%	54	10.07%	15	2.80%	536
Lake	502	75.04%	135	20.18%	32	4.78%	669
Lee	295	63.99%	43	9.33%	123	26.68%	461
Leon	713	86.74%	100	12.17%	9	1.09%	822
Levy	413	84.29%	62	12.65%	15	3.06%	490
Liberty	172	77.13%	47	21.08%	4	1.79%	223
Madison	590	96.41%	13	2.12%	9	1.47%	612
Manatee	620	76.92%	66	8.19%	120	14.89%	806
Marion	1,370	79.88%	296	17.26%	49	2.86%	1,715
Monroe	651	64.26%	170	16.78%	192	18.95%	1,013
Nassau	378	84.94%	58	13.03%	9	2.02%	445
Orange	1,081	67.27%	476	29.62%	50	3.11%	1,607
Osceola	233	86.62%	33	12.27%	3	1.12%	269
Pasco	438	90.87%	34	7.05%	10	2.07%	482
Polk	1,169	82.44%	152	10.72%	97	6.84%	1,418
Putnam	771	68.35%	357	31.65%	-	0.00%	1,128
Santa Rosa	688	89.70%	46	6.00%	33	4.30%	767
St. Johns	758	71.78%	224	21.21%	74	7.01%	1,056
St. Lucie	271	78.32%	42	12.14%	33	9.54%	346
Sumter	341	84.83%	40	9.95%	21	5.22%	402
Suwannee	641	74.28%	70	8.11%	152	17.61%	863
Taylor	313	72.62%	64	14.85%	54	12.53%	431
Volusia	803	71.25%	284	25.20%	40	3.55%	1,127
Wakulla	243	77.14%	47	14.92%	25	7.94%	315
Walton	534	73.35%	167	22.94%	27	3.71%	728
Washington	748	77.35%	150	15.51%	69	7.14%	967
Total	33,036	78.81%	6,453	15.40%	2,427	5.79%	41,916

== Bibliography ==
- Morris, Allen (1965). The Florida Handbook, 1965-66. Tallahassee, FL: The Peninsular Publishing Company.
- Glashan, Roy R. (1979). American Governors and Gubernatorial Elections, 1775-1978. Meckler Books. ISBN 0-930466-17-9.
- Gubernatorial Elections, 1787-1997. Washington, D.C.: Congressional Quarterly Inc. 1998. ISBN 1-56802-396-0.
- Kabat, Ric A. (October 1988). ""Everybody votes for Gilchrist": The Florida gubernatorial campaign of 1908". The Florida Historical Quarterly. LXVII (2). Tampa, FL: Florida Historical Society: 184–203.
