= Joseph M. Terrell =

American politician (1861–1912)

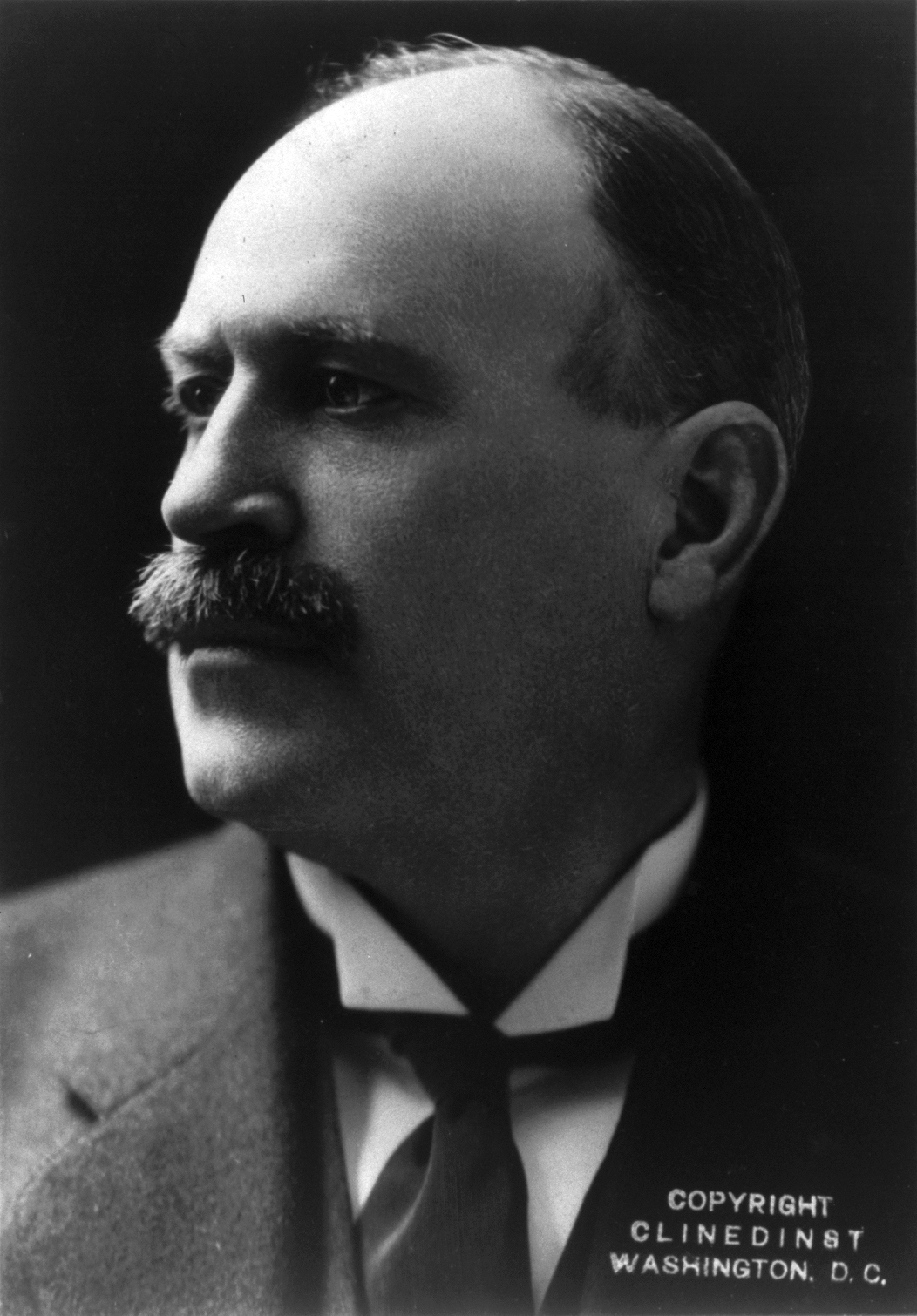
- Terrell in 1911

United States Senator from Georgia
- In office November 17, 1910 – July 14, 1911
- Appointed by: Joseph Mackey Brown
- Preceded by: Alexander S. Clay
- Succeeded by: M. Hoke Smith

57th Governor of Georgia
- In office October 25, 1902 – June 29, 1907
- Preceded by: Allen D. Candler
- Succeeded by: Hoke Smith

37th Attorney General of Georgia
- In office 1892–1902
- Governor: William J. Northen; William Yates Atkinson; Allen D. Candler
- Preceded by: W.A. Little
- Succeeded by: Boykin Wright

Member of the Georgia Senate
- In office 1890–1892

Member of the Georgia House of Representatives
- In office 1884–1887

Personal details
- Born: Joseph Meriwether Terrell; June 6, 1861 Greenville, Georgia, C.S.
- Died: November 17, 1912 (aged 51) Atlanta, Georgia, U.S.
- Party: Democratic
- Spouse: Jessie Lee Spivey (m. 1886)

Joseph Meriwether Terrell (June 6, 1861 – November 17, 1912) was a United States senator and the 57th governor of Georgia.

== Background ==
Born in Greenville, he was the son of Sarah Rebecca (née Anthony) and Dr. Joel Edgar Green Terrell. He attended the common schools, studied law, and was admitted to the bar in 1882, commencing practice in Greenville.

On October 19, 1886, he married Jessie Lee Spivey. They had no children.

Terrell was a self-declared "uncompromising friend of common school education."

Terrell was of English ancestry and of partial Norman descent.

== Career ==
Terrell was a member of the Georgia House of Representatives from 1884 to 1887, and a member of the Georgia Senate in 1890. He served as state attorney general from 1892 to 1902, and Governor of Georgia from 1902 to 1907, marred by the Atlanta race riot of 1906. He resumed the practice of law in Atlanta, and was appointed to the U.S. Senate as a Democrat to fill the vacancy caused by the death of Alexander S. Clay, serving from November 17, 1910, to July 14, 1911, when he resigned. Terrell suffered a stroke in February 1911.

== Death and legacy ==
He again resumed the practice of law in Atlanta although in poor health and died there from Bright's Disease on November 17, 1912. He was survived by his wife.

Interment was in the City Cemetery, Greenville.

The Liberty ship Joseph M. Terrell was named for him. Terrell Hall, on the campus of Georgia College and State University in Milledgeville, was also named for him.

Party political offices
Preceded by Allen D. Candler	Democratic nominee for Governor of Georgia; 1902, 1904	Succeeded by M. Hoke Smith
Political offices
Preceded by Allen D. Candler	Governor of Georgia; 1902–1907	Succeeded by Hoke Smith
U.S. Senate
Preceded by Alexander S. Clay	U.S. Senator (Class 3) from Georgia; 1910–1911	Succeeded by Hoke Smith
