= 1922 United States Senate election in Florida =

- November 7, 1922
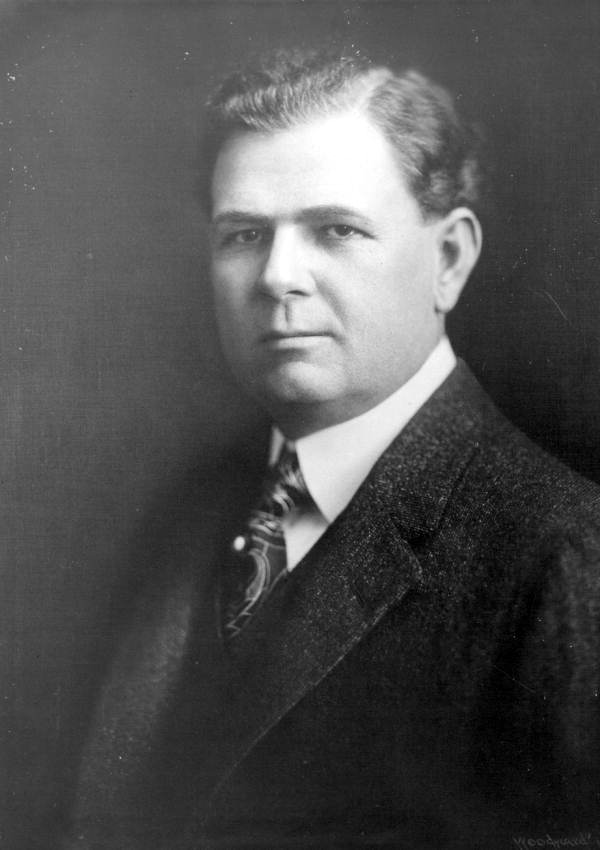

Nominee	Park Trammell	W. C. Lawson
Party	Democratic	Independent Republican
Popular vote	45,707	6,074
Percentage	88.27%	11.73%
- County results Trammell: 70–80% 80–90% >90%
U.S. senator before election
Park Trammell
Democratic
Elected U.S. Senator
Park Trammell
Democratic

The 1922 United States Senate election in Florida was held on November 7, 1922.

Incumbent Democratic Senator Park Trammell was easily re-elected to a second term in office over Independent Republican W. C. Lawson.

== General election ==
=== Candidates ===
- Park Trammell, incumbent Senator since 1917 (Democratic)
- W. C. Lawson (Independent Republican)

=== Results ===
1922 U.S. Senate election in Florida
Party	Candidate	Votes	%	±%
Democratic	Park Trammell (incumbent)	45,707	88.27%	▲5.39
Independent Republican	W. C. Lawson	6,074	11.73%	N/A
Total votes		51,781	100.00%	

== See also ==
- 1922 United States Senate elections
