= 1934 United States Senate election in Florida =

1934 Florida United States Senate Democratic primary
- June 26, 1934
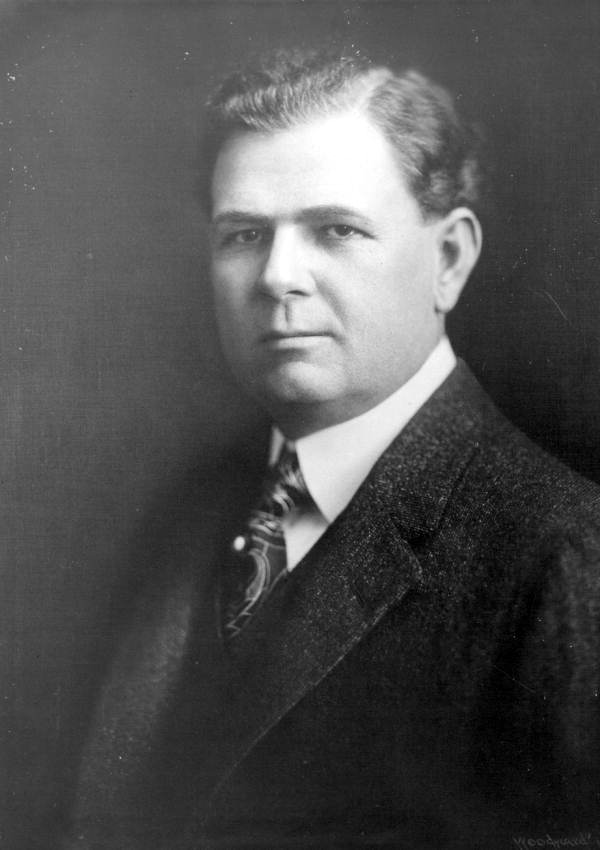

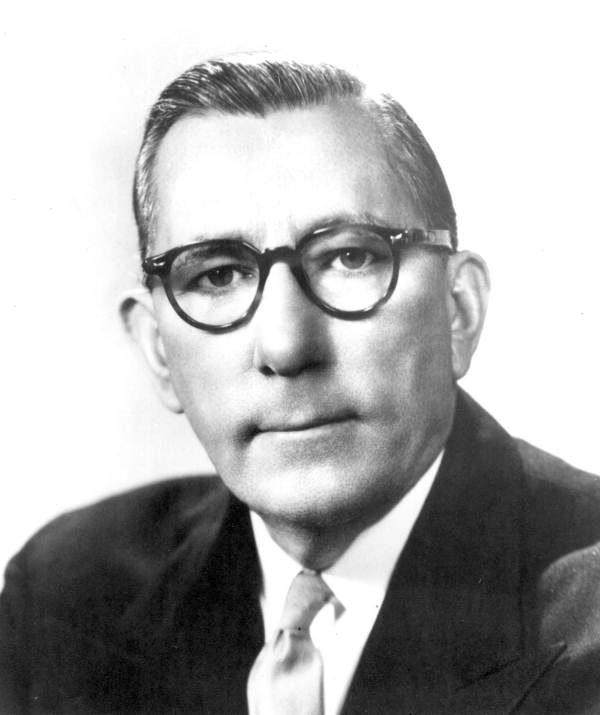
| Nominee | Park Trammell | Claude Pepper |
| Party | Democratic | Democratic |
| Popular vote | 103,028 | 98,978 |
| Percentage | 51.00% | 49.00% |
- Primary county results Trammell: 50–60% 60–70% 70–80% Pepper: 50–60% 60–70% 70–80% 80–90%
U.S. senator before election
Park Trammell
Democratic
Elected U.S. Senator
Park Trammell
Democratic

The 1934 United States Senate election in Florida was held on November 6, 1934.

Incumbent Senator Park Trammell ran for a fourth term in office. Trammell failed to achieve a majority in the June 5 primary election, but he narrowly defeated Claude Pepper in a run-off on June 26. Trammell won the November general election without an opponent.

== Democratic primary ==
=== Candidates ===
- Charles A. Mitchell, attorney
- Claude Pepper, attorney and former State Representative
- James F. Sikes, State Senator
- Park Trammell, incumbent Senator since 1917
- Hortense K. Wells, Florida Democratic Committeewoman

=== Results ===
1934 Democratic U.S. Senate primary
| Party | Candidate | Votes | % |
|---|---|---|---|
| Democratic | Park Trammell (incumbent) | 81,321 | 38.02% |
| Democratic | Claude Pepper | 79,396 | 37.12% |
| Democratic | Charles A. Mitchell | 30,455 | 14.24% |
| Democratic | James F. Sikes | 14,558 | 6.81% |
| Democratic | Hortense K. Wells | 8,167 | 3.82% |
| Total votes | | 213,897 | 100.00% |

=== Runoff ===
1934 Democratic U.S. Senate runoff
| Party | Candidate | Votes | % |
|---|---|---|---|
| Democratic | Park Trammell (incumbent) | 103,028 | 51.00% |
| Democratic | Claude Pepper | 98,978 | 49.00% |
| Total votes | | 202,006 | 100.00% |

== General election ==
=== Results ===
1934 U.S. Senate election in Florida
| Party | Candidate | Votes | % | ±% |
|---|---|---|---|---|
| Democratic | Park Trammell (incumbent) | 131,780 | 100.00% | ▲21.47 |
| Total votes | | 131,780 | 100.00% | |

== Aftermath ==
Senator Trammell died during his fourth term in 1936.

Pepper ran for Florida's other Senate seat in 1936 and won without an opponent.

== See also ==
- 1934 United States Senate elections
