= 1912 Georgia gubernatorial election =

- October 2, 1912
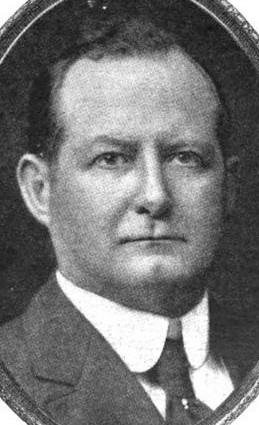
Nominee	John M. Slaton
Party	Democratic
Percentage	100.00%
Governor before election
Joseph Mackey Brown
Democratic
Elected Governor
John M. Slaton
Democratic

The 1912 Georgia gubernatorial election was held on October 2, 1912, in order to elect the Governor of Georgia. Democratic nominee and former Acting Governor of Georgia John M. Slaton ran unopposed and subsequently won the election.

== Democratic primary ==
The Democratic primary election was held in 1912. Former Acting Governor of Georgia John M. Slaton received a majority of the votes (62.14%), and was thus elected as the nominee for the general election on October 2, 1912.

=== Results ===
1912 Democratic gubernatorial primary
Party	Candidate	Votes	%
Democratic	John M. Slaton	104,857	62.14%
Democratic	Hooper Alexander	39,037	23.13%
Democratic	Joe Hill Hall	24,856	14.73%
Total votes		168,750	100.00%

== General election ==
On election day, October 2, 1912, Democratic nominee John M. Slaton ran unopposed and won the election with an unknown number of votes, thereby holding Democratic control over the office of Governor. Slaton was sworn in for his first full term on June 28, 1913.

=== Results ===
Georgia gubernatorial election, 1912
Party	Candidate	Votes	%
Democratic	John M. Slaton		100.00
Total votes			100.00
Democratic hold			

== Bibliography ==
The World Almanac and Encyclopedia, 1913. New York: The Press Publishing Co. (The New York World). 1912.
