= 1916 United States Senate election in Florida =

- November 7, 1916
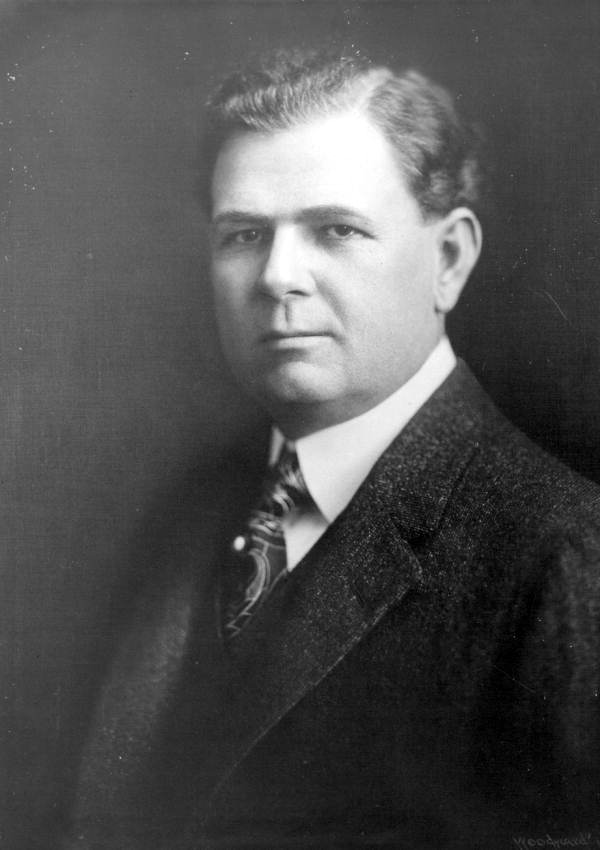

Nominee	Park Trammell	William R. O'Neal
Party	Democratic	Republican
Popular vote	58,391	8,774
Percentage	82.86%	12.45%
- County results Trammell: 60–70% 70–80% 80–90% >90%
U.S. senator before election
Nathan Philemon Bryan
Democratic
Elected U.S. Senator
Park Trammell
Democratic

The 1916 United States Senate election in Florida was held on November 7, 1916.

Incumbent Democratic Senator Nathan Philemon Bryan ran for re-election to a second term in office, but lost the Democratic nomination to Governor of Florida Park Trammell. Trammell easily won the general election.

== General election ==
=== Candidates ===
- R. L. Goodwin (Socialist)
- William R. O'Neal (Republican)
- Park Trammell (Democratic)

=== Results ===
1916 U.S. Senate election in Florida
Party	Candidate	Votes	%
Democratic	Park Trammell	58,391	82.86%
Republican	William R. O'Neal	8,774	12.45%
Socialist	R. L. Goodwin	3,304	4.69%
Total votes		70,469	100.00%

== See also ==
- 1916 United States Senate elections
