= John M. Slaton =

American politician (1866–1955)

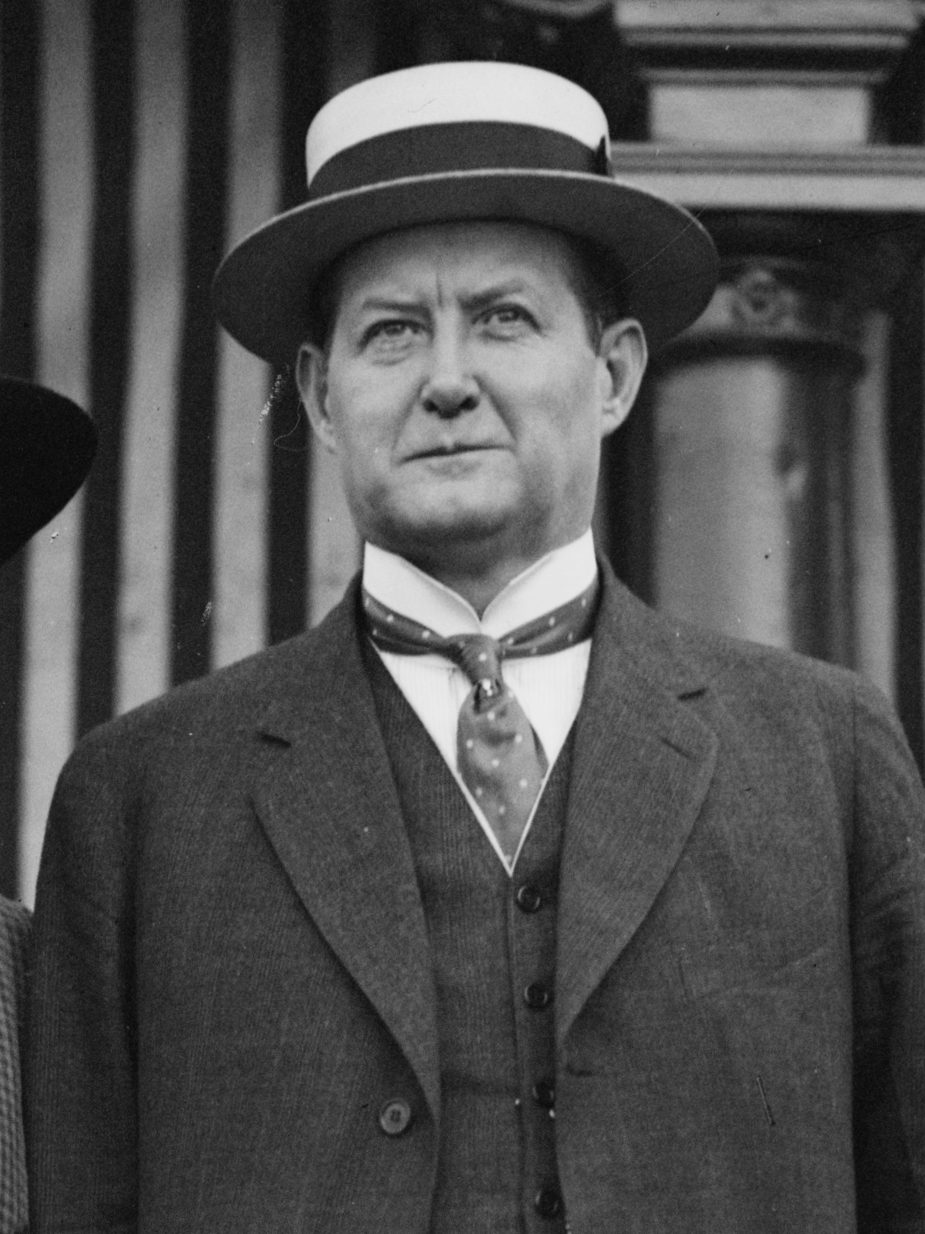

60th Governor of Georgia
- In office June 28, 1913 – June 26, 1915
- Preceded by: Joseph M. Brown
- Succeeded by: Nathaniel E. Harris
- In office November 16, 1911 – January 25, 1912
- Preceded by: M. Hoke Smith
- Succeeded by: Joseph M. Brown

Member of the Georgia Senate
- In office 1909–1913

Member of the Georgia House of Representatives
- In office 1896–1909

Personal details
- Born: John Marshall Slaton; December 25, 1866 Meriwether County, Georgia, U.S.
- Died: January 11, 1955 (aged 88) Atlanta, Georgia, U.S.
- Resting place: Oakland Cemetery
- Party: Democratic
- Spouse: Sarah "Sally" Frances Grant (m. 1898; died 1945)
- Education: University of Georgia (MA)

John Marshall Slaton (December 25, 1866 – January 11, 1955) served two non-consecutive terms as the 60th governor of Georgia. His political career ended in 1915 after he commuted the death sentence of Atlanta factory boss Leo Frank, who had been convicted of the murder of a 13-year-old employee, Mary Phagan. Because of Slaton's law firm partnership with Frank's defense counsel, claims were made that Slaton's involvement represented a conflict of interest. Soon after Slaton's action, Frank was lynched. After Slaton's term as governor ended, he and his wife left the state for a decade. Slaton later served as president of the Georgia State Bar Association.

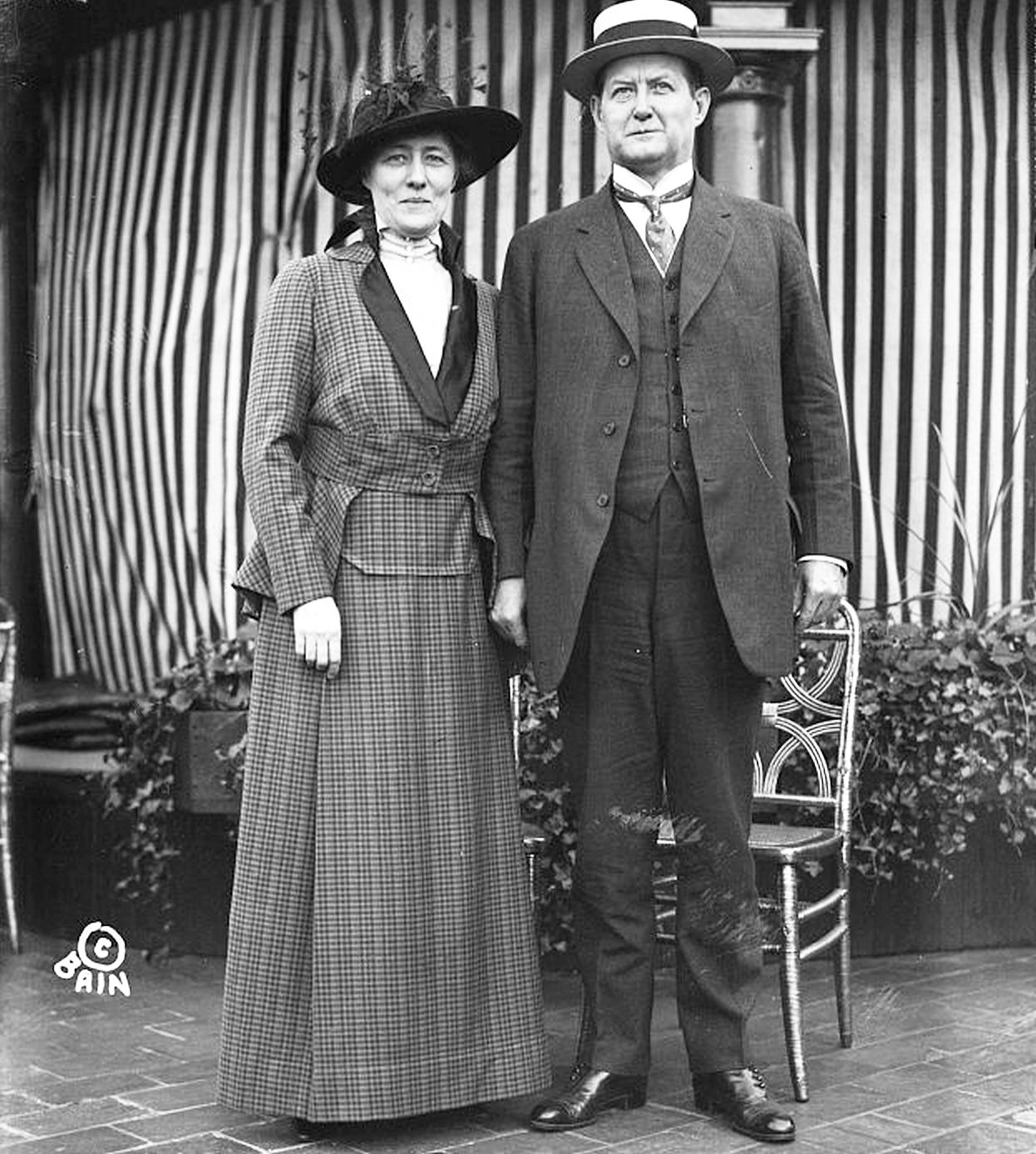
Slaton and his wife, Sarah Frances Grant

== Early life ==
Slaton was born on December 25, 1866, near Greenville in Meriwether County, Georgia to Nancy Jane Martin and William Franklin Slaton. His father was the Superintendent of Schools in Atlanta. He graduated from Boys High School in Atlanta in 1880.

Slaton received a Master of Arts degree with highest honors from the University of Georgia in 1886. He was a member of Chi Phi fraternity and the Phi Kappa Literary Society. He later studied law.

== Personal life ==
Slaton married Sarah Frances Grant on July 12, 1898. She was the daughter of Captain William D. Grant.

== Career ==
Slaton joined John T. Glenn and co-founded the law firm Glenn & Slaton. Slaton represented Fulton County in the Georgia House of Representatives from 1896 to 1909. He was the Speaker of the Georgia House from 1905 to 1909. He represented the 35th District of the Georgia Senate from 1909 to 1913. He also served as President of the senate from 1909 to 1911.

After Governor Hoke Smith was elected to the U.S. Senate in 1911, Slaton was appointed acting governor and served in that capacity from 1911 to 1912. Slaton was later elected to the governorship for a non-consecutive second term from 1913 to 1915.

In 1913 Slaton paroled Mose Houston, the convicted murderer of Delia Green, after serving but twelve years of his life sentence.

=== Leo Frank trial ===
In 1915, Slaton commuted the sentence for Leo Frank from death to life imprisonment. "I can endure misconstruction, abuse and condemnation,... but I cannot stand the constant companionship, of an accusing conscience which would remind me that I, as governor of Georgia, failed to do what I thought to be right.... It means that I must live in obscurity the rest of my days, but I would rather be plowing in a field than to feel that I had that blood on my hands."

Because of the almost universal hostility toward Leo Frank among the general public in Georgia, Governor Slaton's decision to commute his death sentence was widely condemned as unethical, particularly due to his business interests with Leo Frank’s defense team. Public disapproval of Slaton persisted long afterwards. Sparing Frank's life had the effect of ending Slaton's political career, as he had himself predicted.

Some opined that Frank's commutation by Slaton constituted a conflict of interest, in light of Slaton having a law partner who served Frank's lead defense counsel. Slaton's actions led to threats of mob violence against him, and the Georgia National Guard and local police provided him protection.

Fear of violence against him, and/or his wife, led them to leave Georgia, not to return for a decade.

=== Later years ===
After his political service, Slaton served as the President of the Georgia State Bar Association (1928–1929) and as a member of the General Council of the American Bar Association.

In 1935, while addressing a state bar association, Slaton denounced a proposed federal child labor amendment, comparing it to “the extremist degrees of Bolshevism under Lenin” while also attacking what he described as “the advance of Communism and other isms, except Americanism, which invade college walls and student organizations.”

== Death ==
Slaton died in Atlanta on January 11, 1955, and was interred with his wife Sarah Frances Grant Slaton (1870–1945) in the Grant family mausoleum at Atlanta's Oakland Cemetery.

== Legacy and awards ==
In 1939, he received an honorary degree in Doctor of Laws from the University of Georgia and Oglethorpe University. He was given the Legion of Honour by the government of France given his interest in French.

=== In popular culture ===
Slaton is depicted in the musical Parade, which tells the story of the Leo Frank trial and lynching. In act two, the show portrays Slaton's efforts to commute Frank's death penalty sentence. While some scenes are fictionalized—such as an encounter between Lucille Frank (Leo's wife) and Slaton at a party at the Governor's Mansion—the show accurately captures Slaton's work on the Frank case and the ramifications on his political career.

Slaton has also been depicted onscreen. An episode of the 1964 TV series Profiles in Courage dramatized Governor John M. Slaton's decision to commute Frank's sentence. The episode starred Walter Matthau as Governor Slaton. The 1988 TV miniseries The Murder of Mary Phagan was broadcast on NBC, starring Jack Lemmon as Gov. John Slaton.

=== Historical marker ===
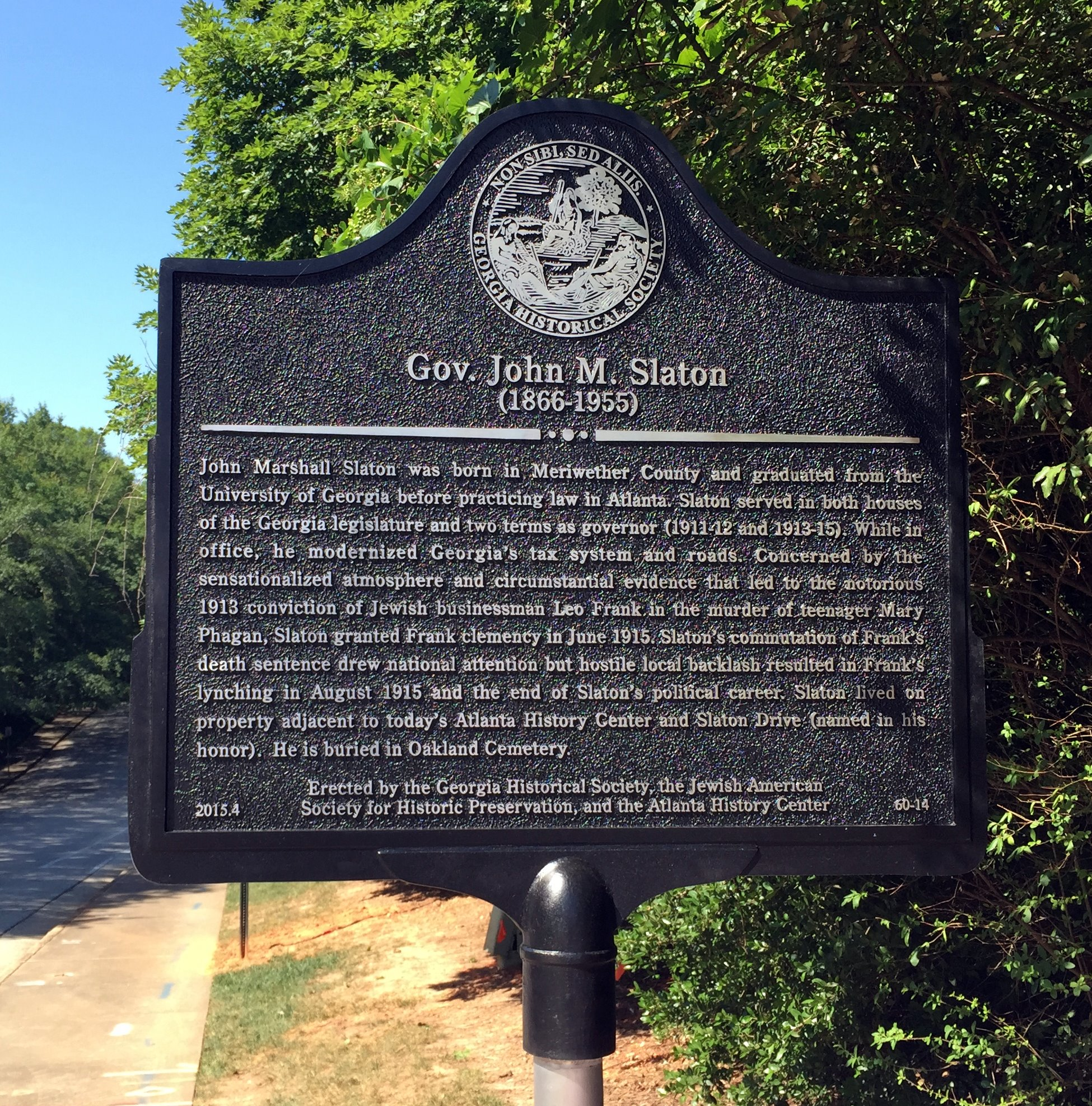
Georgia Historical Society marker for Governor John M. Slaton

On June 17, 2015, the Georgia Historical Society, the Atlanta History Center and the Jewish American Society for Historic Preservation dedicated a historic marker honoring Slaton at the Atlanta History Center. It was the first public honoring of Governor Slaton since his controversial commutation of Leo Frank's death sentence almost 100 years ago to the day.

Participating and in attendance were members of Georgia state and local governments, the judiciary, the Anti-Defamation League, Slaton family members, local and national historical societies and the public.

Georgia Supreme Court Justice David Nahmias said at the dedication:

"In the final blot that the case placed on the history of our state, a mob kidnapped Leo Frank, drove him to Marietta, and lynched him...It is altogether right that we still celebrate what Governor Slaton did, because we need to remember those who stood tall in defense of the rule of law, to inspire all of us who need to stand tall when the rule of law is again threatened, as it is in one way or another almost every day. We need to fight for equal justice under the law, even if we do not immediately prevail. Governor Slaton is, and should be, a particular inspiration to people like me—judges on the courts of Georgia and on the federal courts—the kind of judges who were unable to protect Leo Frank from the unjust ending that the mob demanded."

Letters of support for Governor Slaton were presented by Jerry Klinger, President of the Jewish American Society for Historic Preservation, from Georgia Governor Nathan Deal, U.S. Senator David Perdue, U.S. Senator Johnny Isakson, and Congressman John Lewis.

The marker text reads:

"John Marshall Slaton was born in Meriwether County and graduated from the University of Georgia before practicing law in Atlanta. Slaton served in both houses of the Georgia legislature and two terms as governor (1911–12 and 1913–15). While in office, he modernized Georgia's tax system and roads. Concerned by the sensationalized atmosphere and circumstantial evidence that led to the notorious 1913 conviction of Jewish businessman Leo Frank in the murder of teenager Mary Phagan, Slaton granted Frank clemency in June 1915. Slaton's commutation of Frank's death sentence drew national attention but hostile local backlash resulted in Frank's lynching in August 1915 and the end of Slaton's political career. Slaton lived on property adjacent to today's Atlanta History Center and Slaton Drive (named in his honor). He is buried in Oakland Cemetery.

Erected by the Georgia Historical Society, the Jewish American Society for Historic Preservation and the Atlanta History Center."

== See also ==
- List of speakers of the Georgia House of Representatives

Party political offices
Preceded by Joseph Mackey Brown	Democratic nominee for Governor of Georgia; 1912	Succeeded by Nathaniel Edwin Harris
Political offices
Preceded by Hoke Smith	Governor of Georgia; 1911–1912	Succeeded by Joseph M. Brown
Preceded by Joseph M. Brown	Governor of Georgia; 1913–1915	Succeeded by Nathaniel E. Harris
