= William R. O'Neal =

American lawyer and businessman (1864–1946)

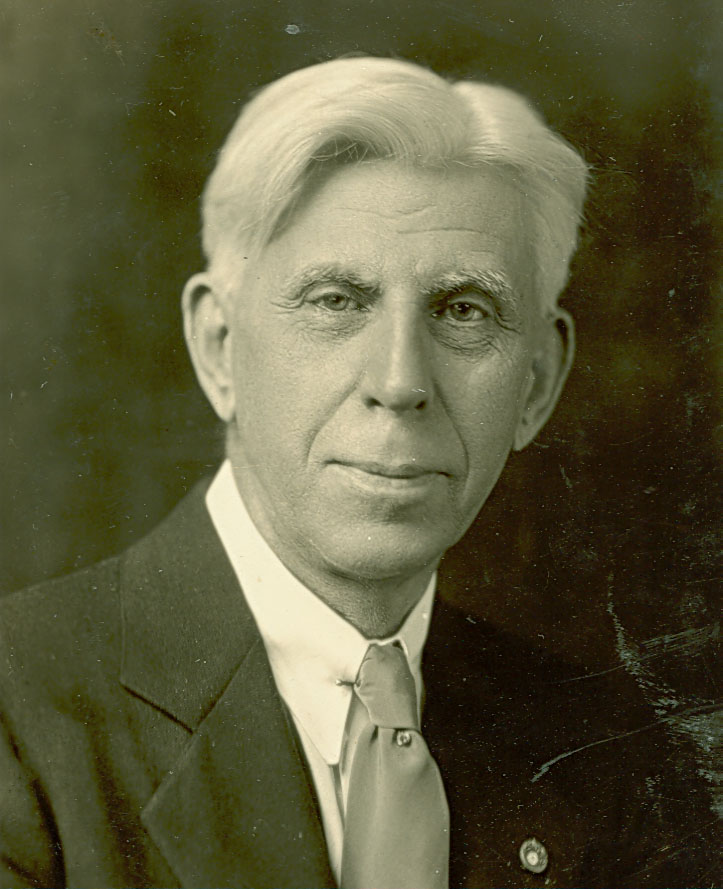

Personal details
- Born: 1864 Ohio, U.S.
- Died: January 23, 1946 (aged 81–82) Orlando, Florida, U.S.
- Resting place: Greenwood Cemetery
- Party: Republican
- Spouse(s): Mabelle Copeland (m. 1886; died 1910) Jessie Malory Thayer (m. 1914; died 1923)
- Children: 2

William Russell O'Neal (1864 – January 23, 1946) was an American lawyer and businessman who was involved in banking, insurance, real estate, was a passenger agent for the Atlantic Coast Line Railroad in Orlando, Florida, owned newspapers, and wrote a newspaper column. He was a trustee of Rollins College. A Republican, he ran for governor, U.S. Senate, and Florida Superintendent of Public Education, losing each time to the candidate of the then dominant Democratic Party.

He was born in Ohio. He married in Maine and moved to Orlando in 1886.

He served as postmaster in Orlando and was president of the city council for 10 years. He wrote for the Orange County Reporter and Orlando Sentinel.

He led Florida's provisional League to Enforce Peace delegation.

His political campaigning in 1920 for the Republican Party after the Ocoee massacre was seen as a threat to the white supremacist policies promoted by the dominant Democratic Party.

In 1886, O'Neal married Mabelle Copeland in Maine. They had two daughters, Helen and Mabelle. Mrs. O'Neal died in 1910 and in 1914 O'Neal married Jessie Malory Thayer. She died in 1923.

He is buried at the Greenwood Cemetery in Orlando.

Party political offices
New title	Republican nominee for United States Senator from Florida (Class 1); 1916	Vacant Title next held by Barclay Harding Warburton I
Preceded by George E. Gay	Republican nominee for Governor of Florida; 1924	Succeeded by William J. Howey
