= Albert W. Gilchrist =

American politician (1858–1926)

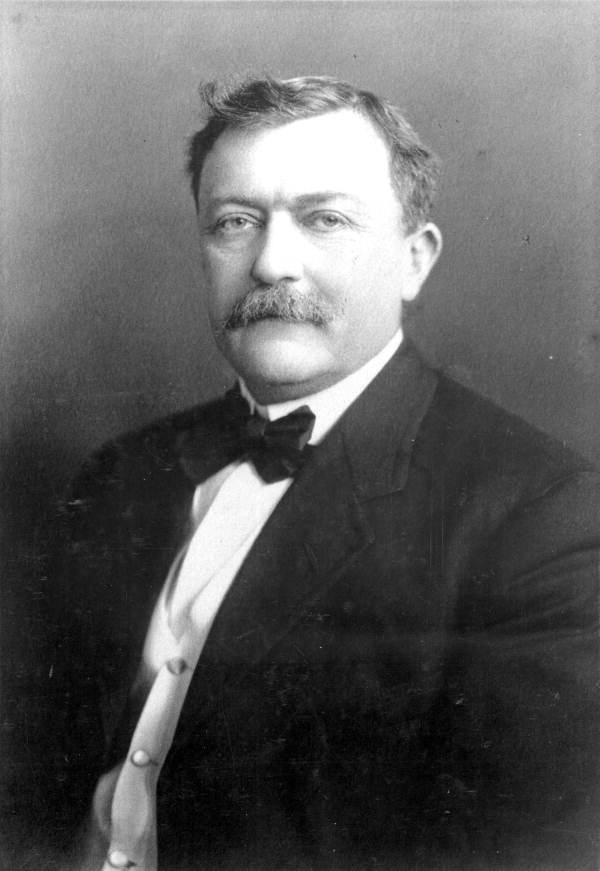

20th Governor of Florida
- In office January 5, 1909 – January 7, 1913
- Preceded by: Napoleon B. Broward
- Succeeded by: Park Trammell

Speaker of the Florida House of Representatives
- In office 1905
- Preceded by: Cromwell Gibbons
- Succeeded by: Eugene S. Matthews

Member of the Florida House of Representatives
- In office 1903–1905
- Preceded by: R. E. Brown
- Succeeded by: William H. Hooker
- Constituency: DeSoto County
- In office 1893–1895
- Preceded by: T. O. Parker
- Succeeded by: O. T. Stanford
- Constituency: DeSoto County

Personal details
- Born: January 15, 1858 Greenwood, South Carolina, U.S.
- Died: May 15, 1926 (aged 68) New York, New York, U.S.
- Party: Democratic

Military service
- Allegiance: United States
- Branch/service: United States Army
- Rank: Brigadier General
- Unit: Florida State Militia
- Battles/wars: Spanish–American War

Albert Waller Gilchrist (January 15, 1858 – May 15, 1926) was an American politician who served as the 20th governor of Florida. Gilchrist was born in South Carolina before moving to Punta Gorda, Florida. A progressive Democrat, he was elected to the Florida House of Representatives in 1893 and served as speaker in 1905. Gilchrist is the namesake for Gilchrist County, Florida.

== Early life and education ==
Born in Greenwood, South Carolina, Gilchrist first attended Carolina Military Institute in Charlotte, North Carolina, where he was a member of Sigma Alpha Epsilon fraternity before attending the United States Military Academy at West Point. He would have graduated in 1882, but he did not because he was deficient in experimental philosophy after three years.

=== Early career ===
Gilchrist became a civil engineer and real estate dealer before settling in Punta Gorda, Florida, to become an orange grower. He served in the Florida state militia until 1898, reaching the rank of brigadier general. Gilchrist went on to join the Company C, of the 3rd U.S. Volunteer Infantry, and served in the U.S. Army during the Spanish–American War in Cuba. He reached the rank of captain in the regular army, before being discharged in 1899.

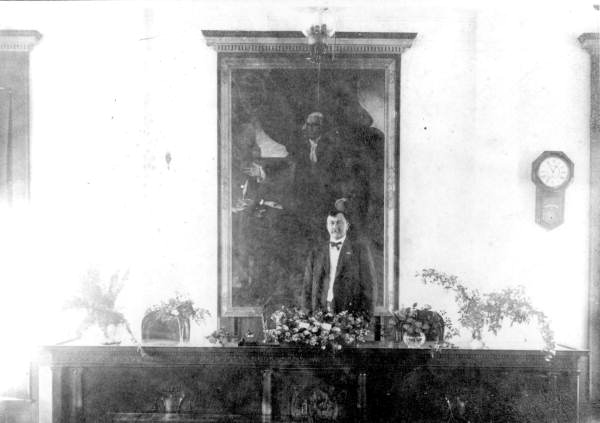
Gilchrist as the Speaker of the Florida House in April 1905.

== Political career ==
In 1893, Gilchrist was elected to the Florida House of Representatives. He served in it until 1897. He represented DeSoto County, Florida. He returned in 1903, and in 1905 he became Speaker of the Florida House and left the legislature.

Gilchrist was elected governor on November 3, 1908, taking the oath of office on January 5, 1909. As governor, Gilchrist prioritized public health. For instance, he promoted legislation for a pure food law, improved health conditions for state prisoners, a tuberculosis sanitarium, and a "hospital for impoverished crippled children."

Also during his tenure as governor, the Montverde Industrial School was established, new counties were formed, and, following eight years of work, mainland Florida was finally connected to the Florida Keys via an overseas railroad. He left office on January 7, 1913. He ran for U.S. Senate in 1916 and served as a delegate to the 1924 Democratic National Convention.

== Death ==
Gilchrist died on May 15, 1926, in New York, New York. Upon his death, the bachelor governor left a large portion of his estate to local orphans. He is buried at Indian Springs Cemetery on Indian Springs Road in Punta Gorda, Florida.

== Legacy ==
After hearing that the former Governor was dying in a New York hospital, the Florida Legislature quickly introduced and passed a bill naming Gilchrist County after him. The Gilchrist Bridge, which carries U.S. Route 41 south over the Peace River from Port Charlotte to Punta Gorda, is named after Gilchrist.

=== Controversy ===
In 2020, Teddy Ehmann, president of the Charlotte County Historical Society, urged the Punta Gorda City Council to rename Gilchrist Park, of which Gilchrist was the namesake for. In his letter to the council, Ehmann said Gilchrist was a "Southern racist" and asked the council to recognize the indigenous Calusa tribe.

Theresa Murtha, director of the Punta Gorda History Center, said the proposal was "outrageous". She said that Gilchrist was the only Governor of Florida from Punta Gorda, and had a role in the foundation of the city. Former cataloger Lynn Harrell said Gilchrist hired a crew of seven to eight black railroad employees and that "he wouldn't have had a Black crew" if he was a racist.

Party political offices
Preceded by Napoleon B. Broward	Democratic nominee for Governor of Florida; 1908	Succeeded by Park Trammell
Political offices
Preceded by Napoleon B. Broward	Governor of Florida; January 5, 1909 – January 7, 1913	Succeeded by Park Trammell
