= Joseph Mackey Brown =

American politician (1851–1932)

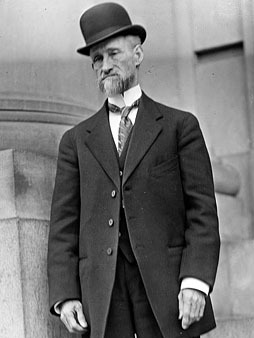
- Brown in 1912

59th Governor of Georgia
- In office June 26, 1909 – July 1, 1911
- Preceded by: M. Hoke Smith
- Succeeded by: M. Hoke Smith
- In office January 25, 1912 – June 28, 1913
- Preceded by: John M. Slaton
- Succeeded by: John M. Slaton

Personal details
- Born: December 28, 1851 Canton, Georgia, U.S.
- Died: March 3, 1932 (aged 80) Marietta, Georgia, U.S.
- Party: Democratic Party
- Parent: Joseph E. Brown (father)
- Education: Oglethorpe University; Harvard Law School

Joseph Mackey Brown (December 28, 1851 – March 3, 1932) was an American politician. He served two non-consecutive terms as the 59th governor of Georgia, the first from 1909 to 1911 and the second from 1912 to 1913. He has also been posthumously implicated as one of the ringleaders in the lynching of Leo Frank.

== Early life ==
Brown was born in Canton, Georgia and was the son of Georgia's Civil War Governor Joseph E. Brown. The family nickname of the younger Brown was "Little Joe Brown".

After graduating from Oglethorpe University in 1872 (where he joined Chi Phi fraternity), Brown attended Harvard University for a time to study law. He continued his studies at his brother's Georgia law practice and passed the bar in 1873; however, he never practiced law due to failing eyesight. He continued his studies at an Atlanta, Georgia business college and became a clerk with the Western and Atlantic Railroad. During his career at the railroad he rose to the position of traffic manager for the company, and he married Cora Annie McCord.

== Career ==
In 1904, Brown was appointed to the Georgia State Railroad Commission by then-Governor Joseph M. Terrell. That appointment was rescinded in 1907 when the new Governor, Hoke Smith, removed Brown over disagreements about passenger fares.

Brown exacted revenge by running against Smith in the 1908 gubernatorial election and winning. Smith again won the governorship in the election of 1910 by beating Brown in the Democratic primary and in the general election in which Brown ran as an independent. Smith left before the end of his second term to assume the United States Senate seat that became vacant upon the death of Alexander S. Clay, and Brown ran unopposed to become Governor again for the rest of Smith's original term.

Brown faced Smith once again in the 1914 election for the Senate seat previously filled by Smith. Smith won that election.

Brown also wrote two books, The Mountain Campaigns in Georgia (1886) and Astyanax (1907), served as director and vice president of the First National Bank of Marietta, and owned and operated Cherokee Mills in Marietta.

On August 17, 1915, Brown was involved in the lynching of Jewish factory manager, Leo Frank. Frank was accused of murdering his coworker Mary Phagan. The lynching occurred after Frank's sentence was commuted from the death penalty to life in prison. Prior to the lynching, Brown played a key role in instigating violence towards Frank in the Augusta Chronicle and the Macon Telegraph. Commenting on the commutation of Frank, Brown stated: "the necessity will be upon the people to form mobs and execute them properly."

== Death ==
Brown died in 1932 in Marietta, Georgia and is buried in the Oakland Cemetery in Atlanta, Georgia.

Party political offices
Preceded by M. Hoke Smith	Democratic nominee for Governor of Georgia; 1908	Succeeded by M. Hoke Smith
Preceded by M. Hoke Smith	Democratic nominee for Governor of Georgia; 1912	Succeeded by John M. Slaton
Political offices
Preceded by Hoke Smith	Governor of Georgia; 1909–1911	Succeeded by Hoke Smith
Preceded by John M. Slaton	Governor of Georgia; 1912–1913	Succeeded by John M. Slaton
