= General Clay =

General Clay may refer to:

- Cassius Marcellus Clay (politician) (1810–1903), Union Army major general
- Cecil Clay (1842–1903), Union Army brevet brigadier general (promoted post-service)
- Frank Butner Clay (1921–2006), U.S. Army major general
- Green Clay (1757–1828), Kentucky Militia general in the War of 1812
- John Granby Clay (1766–1846), British Army general
- Lucius D. Clay (1898–1978), U.S. Army general
- Lucius D. Clay Jr. (1919–1994), U.S. Air Force general
