= Senator Clay =

Senator Clay may refer to:

== Members of the United States Senate ==
- Alexander S. Clay (1853–1910), U.S. Senator from Georgia from 1897 to 1910
- Clement Claiborne Clay (1816–1882), U.S. Senator from Alabama from 1853 to 1861; Confederate States Senator from Alabama from 1862 to 1864
- Clement Comer Clay (1789–1866), U.S. Senator from Alabama from 1837 to 1841
- Henry Clay (1777–1852), U.S. Senator from Kentucky from 1849 to 1852

== United States state senate members ==
- Chuck Clay (born 1950), Georgia State Senate
- Herbert Clay (1881–1923), Georgia State Senate
- Green Clay (1757–1826), Kentucky State Senate
- James F. Clay (1840–1921), Kentucky State Senate
- Lacy Clay (born 1956), Missouri State Senate
- Rudy Clay (politician) (1935–2013), Indiana State Senate
