= List of presidents of the Georgia State Senate =

This office existed until 1945, when the office of Lieutenant Governor of Georgia assumed the responsibilities of the Georgia State Senate's presidency.

== List of presidents ==
President	Party	Start of service	End of service
Stephen Heard		1780	1780
Benjamin Taliaferro		1792	1796
David Emanuel		1797	1801
William Barnett		1801	1803
Henry Mitchell		1803	1808
Matthew Talbot		1818	1823
Thomas Stocks		1823	1825
Allen B. Powell		1825	1826
Thomas Stocks		1826	1829
John E. Ward	Democratic	1857	1858
T. L. Guerry	Democratic	1858	1861
John Billups	Democratic	1861	1863
Ambrose R. Wright	Democratic	1863	1865
William Gibson	Democratic	1865	1865
Benjamin F. Conley	Republican	1868	1871
Leander Trammell	Democratic	1871	1878
Rufus Lester	Democratic	1878	1880
James Boynton	Democratic	1880	1883
H.H. Carlton	Democratic	1884	1886
John S. Davidson	Democratic	1886	1888
Fleming DuBignon	Democratic	1888	1890
Robert G. Mitchell	Democratic	1890	1892
Alexander S. Clay	Democratic	1892	1894
William H. Venable	Democratic	1894	1896
Robert L. Berner	Democratic	1896	1898
William A. Dodson	Democratic	1898	1900
Clark Howell	Democratic	1900	1905
William Stanley West	Democratic	1905	1906
John W. Akin	Democratic	1907	1908
J.J. Flyntt	Democratic	1908	1909
John M. Slaton	Democratic	1909	1913
J. Randolph Anderson	Democratic	1913	1915
G. Ogden Persons	Democratic	1915	1917
Samuel L. Olive	Democratic	1917	1921
Herbert Clay	Democratic	1921	1923
George H. Carswell	Democratic	1923	1925
J. Howard Ennis	Democratic	1925	1927
E. B. Dykes	Democratic	1927	1929
W. Cecil Neill	Democratic	1929	1932
Hamilton McWhorter	Democratic	1933	1935
Charles D. Redwine	Democratic	1935	1937
John B. Spivey	Democratic	1937	1941
Charles D. Redwine	Democratic	1941	1943
Frank C. Gross	Democratic	1943	1945

== Presidents pro tempore ==
President	Party	Start of service	End of service
Rufus E. Lester		1875	1877
Evan Howell		1877	1879
John S. Davidson		1885	1887
C. R. Pringle		1887	1889
Robert Whitfield		1889	1891
Joseph M. Terrell		1891	1893
C. W. Smith		1893	1894
C. H. Brand		1894	1894
C. G. Gray		1896	1896
Charlton E. Battle		1897	1899
J. R. Terrell		1899	1901
P. J. Sullivan		1902	1902
A. O. Blalock		1911	1911
E. L. Smith		1913	1913
Ron. E. P. Dobbs		1915	1917
David Peacock		1917	1918
E. V. Heath		1918	1919
J. H. Ennis		1919	1921
L. C. Brown		1921	1923
James L. Gillis Sr.		1923	1925
J. A. Dixon		1925	1927
Eurith D. Rivers		1927	1929
E. M. Williams		1929	1931
Guy Jackson		1931	1933
Hugh A. Carithers		1933	1935
Preston Rawlins		1935	1937
J. H. Terrell		1937	1939
H. Dixon Smith		1939	1941
H. B. Edwards		1941	1943
David S. Atkinson		1943	1945
Spence M. Grayson		1945	1947
William T. Dean		1947	1949
Spence M. Grayson		1949	1953
J. Douglas Carlisle		1953	1955
G. Everett Millican		1955	1957
Dixon Oxford		1957	1959
Robert H. Jordan		1959	1959
Carl Sanders		1959	1963
Harry C. Jackson		1963	1967
Julian Webb		1967	1969
Hugh Gillis		1969	1975
Al Holloway		1975	1983
Joseph E. Kennedy		1983	1991
Wayne J. Garner		1991	1993
Walter S. Ray		1993	1997
Sonny Perdue		1997	1999
Terrell Starr		1999	2003
Eric Johnson		2003	2009
Tommie Williams		2009	2013
David Shafer		2013	2018
Butch Miller		2018	2023
John F. Kennedy		2023	present

== See also ==
- List of Georgia state legislatures
