= List of leaders of Georgia =

List of leaders of Georgia may refer to:

- List of leaders of Georgia (country)
- List of governors of Georgia
- List of colonial governors of Georgia
- List of presidents of the Georgia State Senate
- List of speakers of the Georgia House of Representatives
- List of minority leaders of the Georgia House of Representatives
- List of minority leaders of the Georgia State Senate

== See also ==
- Leader of Georgia (disambiguation)
