= 2008 Georgia State Senate election =

Georgia State Senate elections, 2008

All 56 seats in the Georgia State Senate
	Majority party	Minority party
Leader	Eric Johnson	Robert Brown
Party	Republican	Democratic
Leader's seat	1st-Savannah	26th-Macon
Last election	34	22
Seats before	34	22
Seats after	34	22
Seat change	Steady	Steady
Popular vote	1,879,101	1,274,356
Percentage	57.8%	42.2%
- Results: Republican hold Democratic hold
President pro tempore before election
Eric Johnson
Republican
Elected President pro tempore
Eric Johnson
Republican

The 2008 Georgia State Senate elections occurred on November 4, 2008, to elect the members to the Georgia State Senate. All fifty-six seats in the state Senate and all 180 seats in the state House were up for two-year terms. The winners of this election cycle served in the 150th Georgia General Assembly.

In 2008, most races for the Georgia State Senate were unopposed. The closest state Senate election was in the 46th district, in which incumbent State Senator Bill Cowsert (R-Athens) defeated Sherry L. Jackson (D) 57.8% to 42.2%.

== Incumbents defeated in primary ==
- Gail Davenport (D-Dis. 44)
- Nancy Schaefer (R-Dis. 50)

== Predictions ==
Source	Ranking	As of
Stateline	Safe R	October 15, 2008
