= Hugh John Casey =

United States Army General

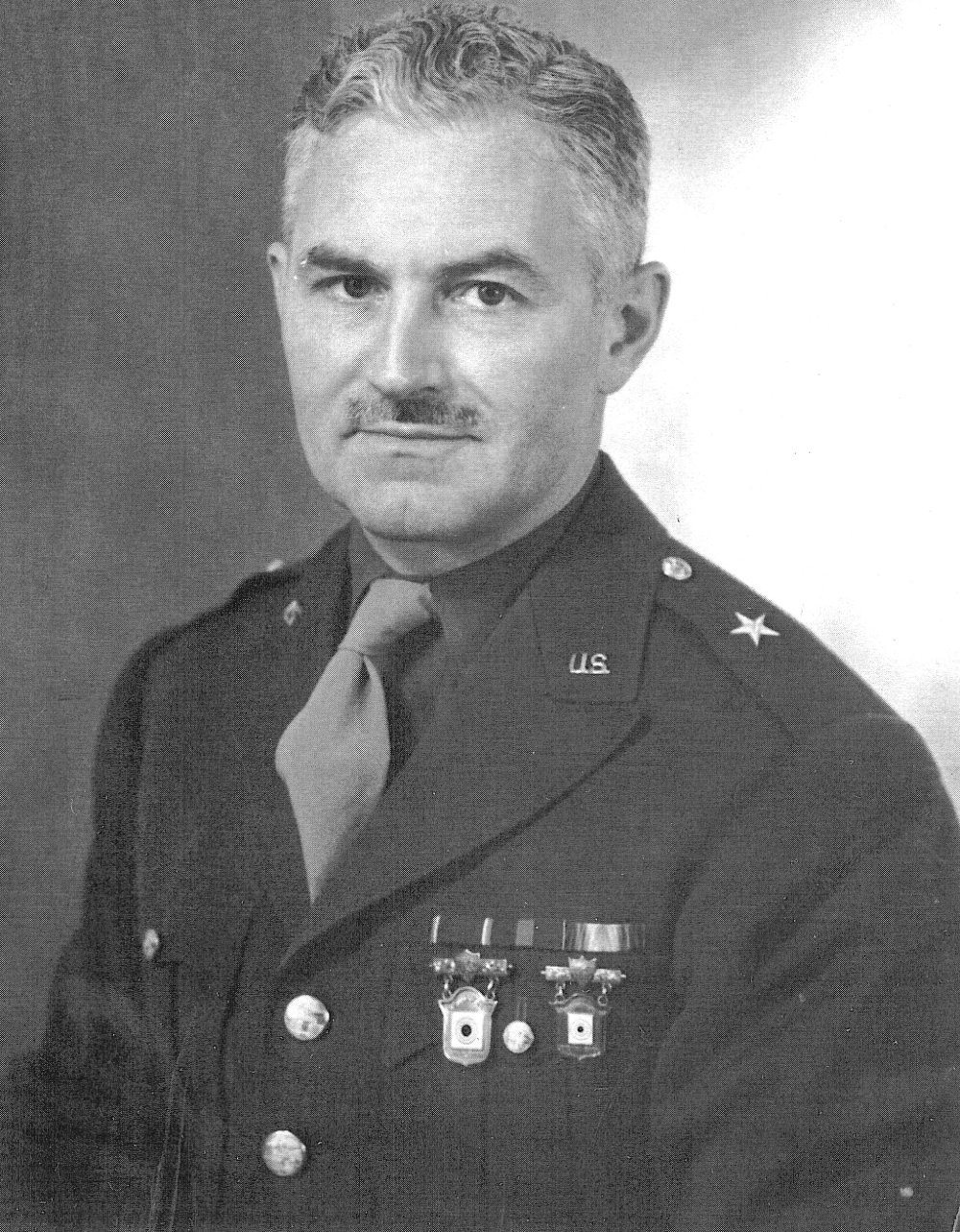
- Brigadier General Hugh J. Casey in 1943
- Born: 7 June 1898; Brooklyn, New York, US
- Died: 30 August 1981 (aged 83); White River Junction, Vermont, US
- Burial place: Arlington National Cemetery
- Relatives: Hugh Boyd Casey (son); Frank Butner Clay (son in law)
- Military career
- Allegiance: United States of America
- Branch: United States Army
- Service years: 1918–1949
- Rank: Major General
- Nickname: Pat
- Service number: 0-9298
- Conflicts: World War I: Occupation of the Rhineland; World War II: Philippines Campaign (1941–42); New Guinea Campaign; Philippines Campaign (1944–45); Occupation of Japan
- Awards: Distinguished Service Cross; Distinguished Service Medal (2); Silver Star; Legion of Merit; Bronze Star; Distinguished Service Star (Philippines) (2); Honorary Commander of the Order of the British Empire (Australia); Commander, Order of Orange-Nassau (Netherlands); Officer, Légion d'honneur (France)
- Other work: Chairman, New York City Transit Authority

Hugh John "Pat" Casey CBE (7 June 1898 – 30 August 1981) was a major general in the United States Army. A 1918 graduate of the U.S. Military Academy at West Point, Casey served in Germany during the Occupation of the Rhineland. He later returned to Germany to attend the Technische Hochschule in Berlin, earning a Doctor of Engineering degree.

As an engineer, Casey prepared a voluminous report on flood control for the Pittsburgh District. He was involved with the design and construction of the Deadman Island Lock and Dam on the Ohio River, and was chief of the Engineering Division at the Passamaquoddy Tidal Power Project, a New Deal public works project. He went to the Philippines in 1937 to advise the government there on hydropower and flood control. In the early part of World War II, he became involved with the enormous wartime construction program. Perhaps his most notable and lasting achievement was his involvement with the design of The Pentagon, the largest office building in the world.

Casey served as General of the Army Douglas MacArthur's chief engineer during the Battle of Bataan, in the jungles and mountains of New Guinea and the Philippines, and during the occupation of Japan. In the Battle of Leyte, he commanded the Army Support Command (ASCOM), which was responsible for all construction and logistics activities in the forward area. He hoped to become Chief of Engineers, but President Harry S. Truman passed him over. Later, Casey worked for Schenley Industries from 1951 until his retirement in 1965, and was chairman of the New York City Transit Authority from 1953 to 1955.

== Early life ==
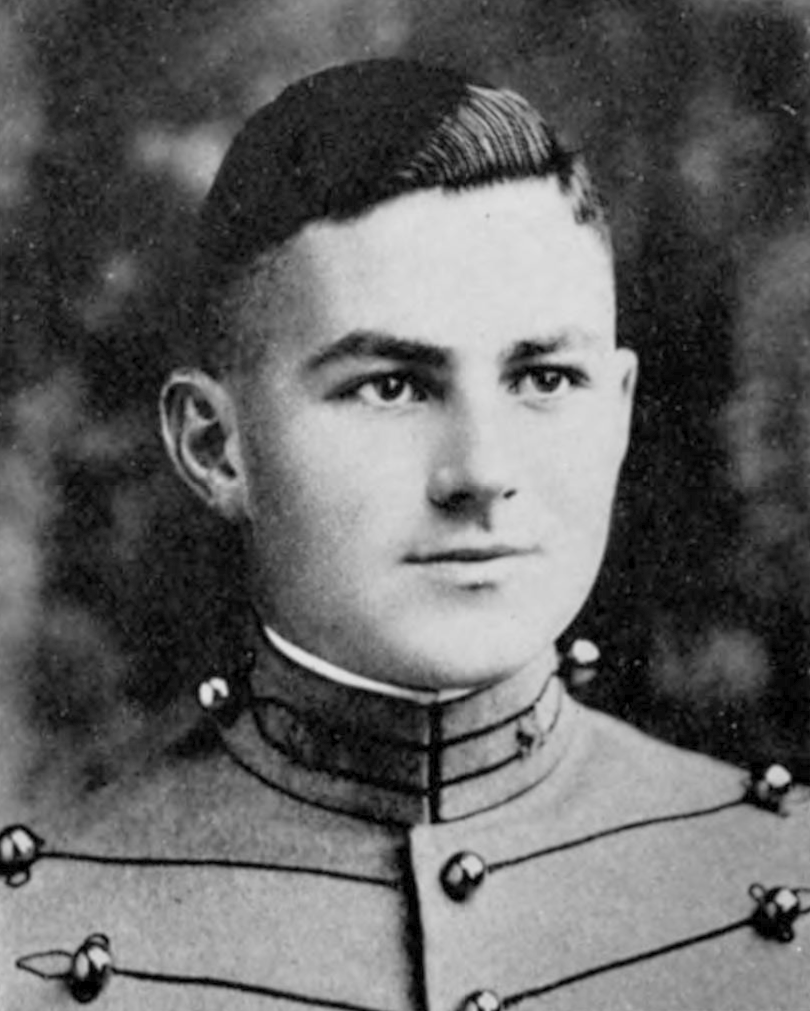
At West Point in 1918

Hugh John Casey was born in Brooklyn, New York on 7 June 1898, the son of John J. Casey, a plumbing and heating contractor, and Margaret L. Casey. John's grandparents were immigrants from Ireland and England. His grandfather served on the Union side in the American Civil War and was killed in the Battle of Shiloh. Margaret's parents were Irish immigrants who settled in Pennsylvania.

Hugh Casey was educated at Manual Training High School from 1910 to 1914, graduating at the age of 15. He won a New York State scholarship and entered Brooklyn Polytechnic Institute, where he studied civil engineering. After a year there, he took a competitive examination for the U.S. Military Academy at West Point held by Congressman Daniel J. Griffin, the chairman of the House Committee on Military Affairs, ranking first out of 62 applicants for the appointment. To enter, Casey claimed to be slightly older, adopting his brother's 7 June birthday.

Casey entered West Point in 1915, where his best friend and roommate was Lucius D. Clay. At West Point, Casey played football as a halfback, substituting for Elmer Oliphant. One of Casey's duties was tutoring Oliphant in mathematics. Casey decided that winning games was more important than playing, and he helped keep Oliphant proficient at math. Unlike most appointees to West Point, a grateful Casey wrote frequently to Griffin about his progress and sent him football tickets. When Casey's younger brother Martin Charles Casey wanted to enter West Point, Griffin directly appointed him to the class of 1920 without having to pass the examination. Martin served with the coastal artillery for eleven years before being medically discharged due to migraine headaches on 30 November 1931. Martin later graduated from Stanford Law School and became a successful lawyer. Both brothers acquired the nickname "Pat" at West Point.

== World War I ==
Because of the United States' entry into World War I, Casey's class graduated early on 12 June 1918. Casey was ranked third in the class and was commissioned as a captain in the United States Army Corps of Engineers. He was stationed at Camp A. A. Humphreys, Virginia, first as an instructor and then starting in September 1918 as a company commander with the 219th Engineers, part of the 19th Division. The 219th Engineers moved to Camp Dodge, Iowa in November 1918. Casey returned to the Engineer School at Camp Humphreys as a student in September 1919.

He served with the US Occupation forces in the Rhineland from June 1920 to May 1922. While there, Casey improved on his high school German to become fluent enough in the language to write his doctoral thesis in the language. He also married Dorothy Ruth Miller, the daughter of Colonel R. B. Miller, the chief surgeon of the American forces stationed in Koblenz, on 22 May 1922. On their honeymoon they traveled through south Germany, Austria, and Switzerland. The couple had three children: two sons, Hugh Boyd and Keith Miles, and a daughter, Patricia.

== Between the wars ==
From 1922 to 1926, Casey was the officer in charge of the Engineer Unit of the Reserve Officers Training Corps (ROTC) at the University of Kansas in Lawrence, Kansas, reverting to his substantive rank of first lieutenant on 27 November 1922. He again returned to Camp Humpreys in 1926 to attend the Company Officers Course. In 1927, Casey received his first civil works assignment, as assistant District Engineer at the Pittsburgh District. Casey took over the task of preparing a voluminous report on flood control. The Corps of Engineers was criticized by the Pittsburgh Flood Control Commission for over-engineering, in planning for a "flood that had never happened and never would happen", and the report was shelved. However, in 1936 the flood did happen. The report was then dusted off and its recommendations were adopted. The Flood Control Act of 1936 assigned responsibility for flood control to the Corps of Engineers and other Federal agencies. Casey was also responsible for construction at Deadman Island Lock and Dam (now called the Dashields Locks and Dam) on the Ohio River.

In September 1929 Casey was assigned to the Rivers and Harbors Section of the Office of the Chief of Engineers in Washington, DC. This job involved reviewing the project studies, plans and specifications of all river and harbor projects throughout the United States, including flood control and hydroelectric power projects. He also had responsibility for correspondence with U.S. senators and congressmen. During this time he co-designed and patented the Kingman-Casey Floating Mooring Bit for navigation locks. He was promoted to the substantive rank of captain on 1 May 1933.

Casey won a John R. Freeman fellowship from the American Society of Mechanical Engineers in 1933 to study hydraulics and civil engineering in Germany. For the next two years, he attended the Technische Hochschule in Berlin, earning a Doctorate in Engineering. His thesis, written in German, was on Geschieb Bewegung, the bedload movement in streams. Returning to the United States in June 1935, Casey was posted to Eastport, Maine as chief of the Engineering Division at the Passamaquoddy Tidal Power Project, a New Deal public works project. There, he established a concrete testing laboratory under Charles E. Wuerpel which is now part of the Structures Laboratory at the Waterways Experiment Station at Vicksburg, Mississippi. Due to political forces, the project came to nothing and was allowed to die. After the Passamaquoddy project fell through, Casey served with the Boston Engineer District on flood control surveys of the Connecticut River Valley.

Along with Lucius Clay, Casey was sent to the Philippines in 1937 to advise the government there on hydropower and flood control. They worked with Meralco and other power companies in the Philippines, and conducted a series of surveys, including a detailed one of the Agno River. After Clay returned to the United States, Casey developed plans for the Caliraya Dam, a 40,000 horsepower (30,000 kW) hydroelectric project with an estimated cost of $5 million. Along with Lieutenant Colonel Dwight D. Eisenhower, the chief of staff to Major General Douglas MacArthur, the Military Advisor to the Commonwealth Government of the Philippines, and Mr. Rodriquez of the National Power Corporation, Casey presented the project to President Manuel Quezon, who approved it. After over twenty years as a company grade officer, Casey was promoted to major on 1 February 1940.

== World War II ==
=== Construction Division ===
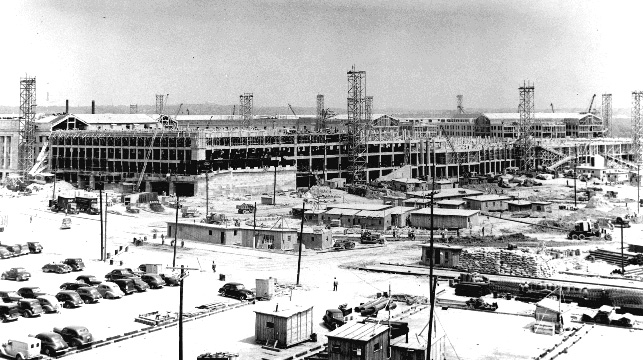
Northwest exposure of the Pentagon's construction underway, 1 July 1942

Casey returned to Washington, D.C. in October 1940 to become chief of the Design and Engineering Section in the Construction Division of the Office of the Quartermaster General, under Brigadier General Brehon B. Somervell. An enormous construction program was underway to meet the needs of World War II. Working with a staff that included George Bergstrom, a former president of the American Institute of Architects, Casey set about revising the standard designs for barracks. A number of new features were added to improve comfort, safety, and durability. Substitutions were made for scarce materials. It was discovered that the standard 63-man barracks was now too small. Of the 81 companies in the new triangular division, 51 fitted more easily into 74-man barracks. By slightly increasing the barracks size, substantial savings were made by reducing the overall number of buildings that needed to be constructed, the size of the cantonment areas required, and the length of required roads and utility lines. Casey was promoted to lieutenant colonel on 8 April 1941.

On the afternoon of Thursday, 17 July 1941, Somervell summoned Casey and Bergstrom and gave them a new special project: the design of an enormous office complex to house the War Department's 40,000-person staff together in one building. Somervell gave them until 09:00 on Monday morning to design the building, which he envisaged as a modern, four-story structure with no elevators, on the site of the old Washington Hoover Airport. This would ultimately become The Pentagon, the largest office building in the world. Over that "very busy weekend", Casey, Bergstrom and their staff roughed out the design for a four-story, five-sided structure with a floor area of 5,100,000 square feet (470,000 m^{2})—twice that of the Empire State Building. The estimated cost was $35 million. President Roosevelt subsequently moved the site of the building, over Somervell's objections, away from Arlington National Cemetery.

=== Southwest Pacific ===
In September 1941, General Douglas MacArthur requested Casey's services as his chief engineer. Casey arrived in Manila in October, shortly before the outbreak of war between the United States and Japan. He acquired construction equipment from the National Power Corporation that was being used on the Caliraya project. Casey supervised demolitions as MacArthur's troops retreated to Bataan, for which he was awarded the Distinguished Service Cross. Unlike the rest of MacArthur's headquarters, Casey, who was promoted to colonel on 19 December 1941 and brigadier general on 25 January 1942, did not relocate to Corregidor but remained on Bataan with a small staff of five officers. However, he joined MacArthur and sixteen other members of his staff in their escape from Corregidor by PT boat in March 1942. For his service in the 1942 campaign in the Philippines, he was awarded the Army Distinguished Service Medal.

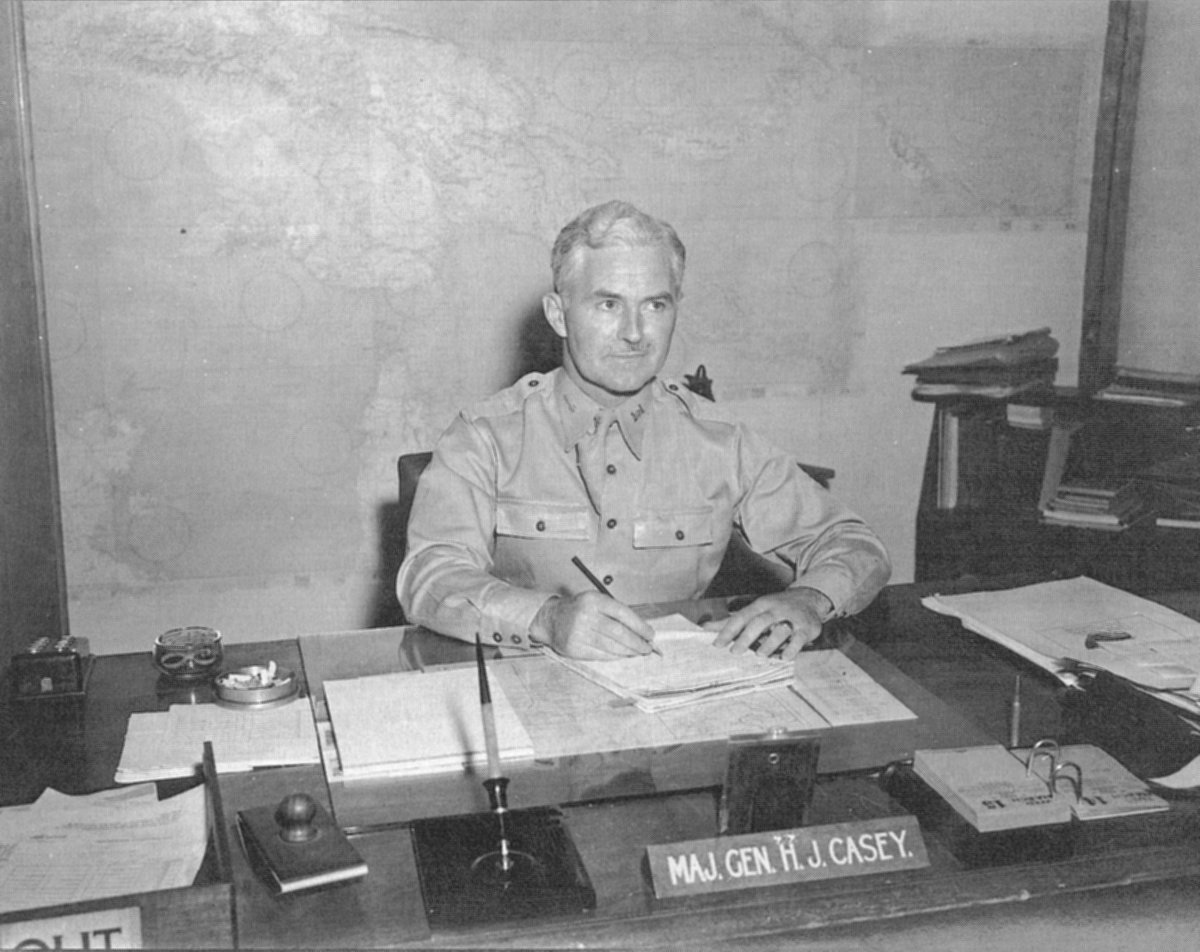
Major General Hugh J. Casey at his desk in Brisbane

In Australia, Casey became Chief Engineer at MacArthur's General Headquarters (GHQ), Southwest Pacific Area (SWPA). He faced enormous engineering challenges. Most of New Guinea consisted of mountains and jungle, with very few airstrips, ports or roads. All of these had to be developed to support operations. To provide additional expertise in construction, Casey had Leif Sverdrup assigned to his staff as chief of the Construction Section, with the rank of colonel. As U.S. Army engineers were few, Casey worked closely with his Australian Army counterpart at General Sir Thomas Blamey's Allied Land Forces headquarters, Major General Clive Steele. Construction activities in Australia were also undertaken by civilians of the Allied Works Council. Casey attempted to coordinate the activities of the various agencies. He had to fend off attempts by the U.S. Army Air Forces to gain control of his aviation engineer battalions. The Royal Australian Air Force organized its own airbase construction squadrons and only with difficulty was Casey able to control their activities.

Casey's initial need was for engineer units to accomplish the daunting construction program, but soon stocks of engineer supplies and equipment began to run low. This was exacerbated by incoming units arriving without their equipment, or with it stowed on numerous ships, which often arrived at various ports in a theater where ports were hundred or thousands of miles apart. Critical shortages developed of tractors, graders, concrete mixers and welding equipment. In the absence of a proper stock control system, an overall coordinating agency, and adequate numbers of engineer depot units, the allocation and distribution of the meager supplies on hand were difficult tasks. The worst problem was spare parts. Equipment was operated around the clock under harsh conditions and soon wore out or broke. A large proportion of equipment became unserviceable for lack of spare parts. Requisitions sent to the United States took months to arrive, so recourse was made to the limited sources of supply in Australia.

In September 1942, MacArthur decided to outflank Japanese troops on the Kokoda Trail by sending an American regimental combat team over the Owen Stanley Range. Two alternate means of crossing the mountains seemed possible. One, the Kapa Kapa Trail was known to climb to elevations above 9,000 feet (2,700 m) and present formidable obstacles. Casey and Sverdrup took charge of investigating the Abau Trail. They reached Abau on 18 September. Casey explored the harbor, taking depth soundings from a native canoe. Sverdrup set out for Jaure with a party of one American, two Australians from the Australian New Guinea Administrative Unit, ten native police from the Royal Papuan Constabulary and 26 native carriers. After eight days on the trail, scaling heights of 5,000 feet (1,500 m), Sverdrup concluded that it would not be practical for troops to traverse the route and turned back. Meanwhile, Casey had concluded that the harbor was too shallow even for lighters. However, the trip was not a total loss, for Sverdrup had sighted a plateau north of the Owen Stanley Range suitable for airstrips, allowing troops to be flown across the Owen Stanley Range. Casey was awarded the Silver Star.

In New Guinea, logistics and construction activities were coordinated by task force engineer staffs. These were often hastily assembled and had not always been able to meet the demands imposed by base development in such a challenging theater of operations. The scale of operations in the Philippines was much greater, so for this purpose the Army Service Command (ASCOM) was formed in Brisbane on 23 July 1944. Casey was appointed to command ASCOM. In his absence, Sverdrup became MacArthur's chief engineer. Although part of USASOS, ASCOM operated under the control of Sixth Army, moving as far forward as combat operations allowed, developed new bases, and operated them until USASOS was ready to take over, at which point the units under ASCOM simply reverted to USASOS, allowing a seamless transfer of command. For the Battle of Leyte Casey's ASCOM had 43,000 men, of whom 21,000 were engineers.

Casey and some members of his staff came ashore on A-Day; the advance echelon of his ASCOM headquarters arrived two days later. Work began immediately on the airfield at Tacloban, and commenced on airfields in central Leyte soon after they were captured. Heavy seasonal rains thwarted attempts to develop the airbases in central Leyte and it was decided to abandon their development and construct a new airbase on the coast at a site occupied by Sixth Army headquarters. The need to get aircraft based on Leyte to stop the Japanese from reinforcing the island was so pressing that Lieutenant General Walter Krueger agreed to move his headquarters.

Casey had intended to come ashore on the first day of the landing at Lingayen Gulf in January 1945 but was delayed a day because the destroyer he was traveling on had to escort a crippled transport. Despite enormous difficulties ASCOM was able to finish numerous projects on time and some ahead of schedule. On 13 February 1945, ASCOM was transferred to USASOS and redesignated the Luzon Base Section (LUBSEC). Casey then resumed his old post, now renamed Chief Engineer, US Army Forces Pacific. For his services as commander of ASCOM, he was awarded the Legion of Merit. He was subsequently awarded a bronze oak leaf cluster to his Distinguished Service Medal for his services as Chief Engineer, US Army Forces Pacific.

Casey hoped to become Chief of Engineers when Lieutenant General Raymond A. Wheeler retired in 1948, but President Harry S. Truman passed him over in favor of the Missouri River Division Engineer, Major General Lewis A. Pick. Instead, Casey remained in Japan as MacArthur's Chief Engineer until Casey's retirement on 31 December 1949. He edited Engineers of the Southwest Pacific, a seven-volume series about their wartime service. He received a number of foreign awards for his service, including the Distinguished Service Star from the Philippines, the Commander of the Order of the British Empire from Australia, the Commander of the Order of Orange-Nassau from the Netherlands, and the Officer of Légion d'honneur from France.

== Later life ==
Casey was Chairman of the New York City Transit Authority from 1953 to 1955, and served in various positions with Schenley Industries from 1951 until his retirement in 1965. He was a member of a number of professional societies, and civic organizations. He died of a heart attack on 30 August 1981 at the Veterans Administration Hospital at White River Junction, Vermont, survived by his wife Dorothy and his son Keith. His other son, Hugh, had been killed in an air crash during the Korean War. Father and son were buried adjacent to each other in Arlington National Cemetery. In August 1982, a new building at the Humphreys Engineer Center at Fort Belvoir was dedicated in his honor by Dorothy and the Chief of Engineers, Lieutenant General Joseph K. Bratton.
