= Senator Davison =

Senator Davison may refer to:

- Joseph Davison (1868–1948), Senate of Northern Ireland
- Kyle Davison (fl. 2010s–present), North Dakota State Senate

== See also ==
- Senator Davidson (disambiguation)
