= Chuck Clay =

American politician (born 1950)

Member of the Georgia Senate from the 37th district
- In office 2003–2005
- In office 1989–1999

Chair of the Georgia Republican Party
- In office 1999–2001

Personal details
- Born: Charles Commander Clay; December 23, 1950 (age 75)
- Party: Republican
- Relatives: Lucius D. Clay (grandfather); Lucius D. Clay Jr. (father)
- Education: University of North Carolina at Chapel Hill (BA); University of Georgia School of Law (JD)
- Profession: Politician

Charles Commander (Chuck) Clay (born December 23, 1950) is an American Republican politician from the state of Georgia. He was a member of the Georgia State Senate from the 37th district from 1989 to 1999 and again from 2003 to 2005. He served as Chair of the Georgia Republican Party from 1999 to 2001. He ran for Lieutenant Governor of Georgia in 1998, but came third in the primary. He ran for Georgia's 6th congressional district in 2004, but came third in the primary. He completed a BA at the UNC Chapel Hill and a JD at the University of Georgia School of Law. As of 2017, Hall Booth Smith, P.C. hired Clay as of counsel.

Clay is the grandson of General Lucius D. Clay and the son of General Lucius D. Clay Jr.

Georgia State Senate
Preceded by Carl Harrison	Member of the Georgia State Senate from the 37th district 1989–1999	Succeeded by Phil Gingrey
Preceded by Phil Gingrey	Member of the Georgia State Senate from the 37th district 2003–2005	Succeeded by John J. Wiles
Preceded by Skin Edge IV	Minority Leader of the Georgia State Senate; 1997–1999	Succeeded by Eric Johnson
Party political offices
Preceded by Rusty Paul	Chair of the Georgia Republican Party; 1999–2001	Succeeded by Ralph Reed
