= Hugh Boyd Casey =

United States Army officer (1925–1952)

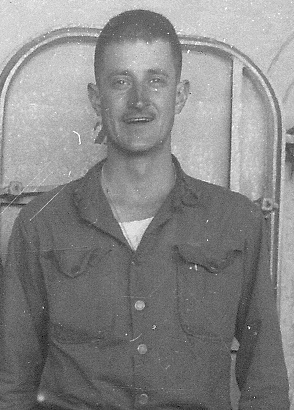
- Born: November 30, 1925; Auburn, Alabama, U.S.
- Died: January 11, 1952 (aged 26)
- Burial place: Arlington National Cemetery, Virginia
- Military career
- Allegiance: United States
- Branch: United States Army Infantry
- Service years: 1944–1952
- Rank: Major
- Conflicts: Korean War: -CCF Intervention Campaign -1st UN Counteroffensive Campaign -CCF Spring Offensive Campaign -Summer – Fall Offensive Campaign
- Awards: Combat Infantryman Badge; Distinguished Service Cross; Silver Star (2); Bronze Star; Purple Heart; Korean Service Medal; United Nations Service Medal.(partial list)

Major Hugh Boyd Casey (November 30, 1925 – January 11, 1952) is the namesake of the U.S. Army 3,500-acre (14 km^{2}) Camp Casey installation in South Korea, named and officially dedicated in 1952 in his memory. Casey was the son of General Hugh John Casey and was killed after surviving combat for almost two years with the 7th Infantry, in a non-hostile airplane crash during the Korean War while serving in the position of aide-de-camp to the 3d Infantry Division Commander. He enlisted in the Army during World War II and served in several South Pacific campaigns. After the war, he was commissioned as a regular Army officer.

== Early life and family ==
Casey was born in Auburn, Alabama. Casey's father, Major General Hugh John Casey, served on the personal staff of General of the Army Douglas MacArthur as his chief engineer during World War II. Casey's sister, Patricia Adams Casey, married Frank Butner Clay, who retired from the U.S. Army as a major general in 1973.

Casey enrolled at Rensselaer Polytechnic Institute in September 1943 to study civil engineering but left the institute in early 1944 to enlist in the army.

== Military career ==
In World War II Hugh Casey was active in the Leyte and Luzon campaigns in the Philippines, for which he received two Silver Star medals.

In August 1945 Casey was a technician fourth grade assigned to the 808th Engineer Aviation Battalion serving in the Philippines. At the end of WWII, Casey was sent to Japan as part of the US occupation forces involved in engineering projects for the U.S. Army in Japan. While stationed at Haneda airdrome near Tokyo he was part of the project engineer of Washington Heights and Grant Heights housing developments for occupying forces. After completing Officer Candidate School in 1948 he was commissioned an infantry second lieutenant in the Regular Army and stationed at Fort Devens in Massachusetts. In 1950, he led a group of expert mine sweepers sent to South Amboy, New Jersey to help cleanup live mines which were in the disaster area after the explosion of an ammunition barge in that city.

=== Korean War ===
In Korea, he was a platoon leader and company commander in Company G, 2nd Battalion, 7th Infantry Regiment, 3rd Infantry Division. He was awarded a Distinguished Service Cross for his actions during the Defence of the Hungman Beachhead in December 1950 and received a battlefield promotion to captain. As a captain, he was made commander of Company G. Shortly after he served as a senior aide to Major General Williston B. Palmer in command of the 10th Corps. He was killed in the crash of a light Army aircraft near Tong Du Chon (Romanization of Korean 동두천 has changed spelling to Dongducheon), South Korea on January 11, 1952.

== Legacy ==
Casey is buried at Arlington National Cemetery. Shortly after his death, the 1st Corps Reserve training area in Korea was named Camp Casey in his honor. The Hugh B. Casey memorial Award was established in his honor for the "most outstanding soldier of the 7th Infantry Regiment" of the 3rd Infantry Division.

== Medals, Awards and Badges ==
Combat Infantryman Badge

- Distinguished Service Cross (United States)
- Silver Star with 1 oak leaf cluster
- Bronze Star
- Purple Heart
- Air Medal
- Good Conduct Medal
- Asiatic-Pacific Campaign Medal with 3 campaign stars
- World War II Victory Medal
- Army of Occupation Medal with Japan clasp
- National Defense Service Medal
- Korean Service Medal with 7 service stars
- Republic of the Philippines Liberation Medal
- United Nations Service Medal
- Republic of Korea War Service Medal

- Army Presidential Unit Citation
- Republic of the Philippines Presidential Unit Citation
- Presidential Unit Citation (South Korea)
