= Senator Davidson =

Senator Davidson may refer to:

- Alexander C. Davidson (1826–1897), Alabama State Senate
- Andrew Davidson (soldier) (1840–1902), New York State Senate
- Asbury Bascom Davidson (1855–1920), Texas State Senate
- James Davidson (Kentucky politician) (died 1860), Kentucky State Senate
- John S. Davidson (1846–1894), Georgia State Senate
- John Davidson (Illinois politician) (1924–2012), Illinois State Senate
- Robert H. M. Davidson (1832–1908), Florida State Senate
- Thomas Whitfield Davidson (1876–1974), Texas State Senate
- William Davidson (Pennsylvania representative) (1783–1867), Pennsylvania State Senate

== See also ==
- Senator David (disambiguation)
- Senator Davison (disambiguation)
