= George N. Skene =

American politician

Member of the Georgia State Senate from the 27th district
- In office 1973–1974
- Preceded by: Oliver Bateman

Personal details
- Born: June 29, 1925 Floyd County, Georgia, U.S.
- Died: April 16, 2018 (aged 92)
- Party: Republican
- Education: Mercer University; University of Michigan; John Marshall University Law School

George N. Skene (June 29, 1925 – April 16, 2018) was an American politician. He served as a Republican member for the 27th district of the Georgia State Senate.

== Life and career ==
Skene was born in Floyd County, Georgia. He attended Mercer University, the University of Michigan and John Marshall University Law School.

Skene was a Macon attorney.

Skene served in the Georgia State Senate from 1973 to 1974, representing the 27th district.

Skene died on April 16, 2018, at the age of 92.
