= Phil Gingrey =

American politician (born 1942)

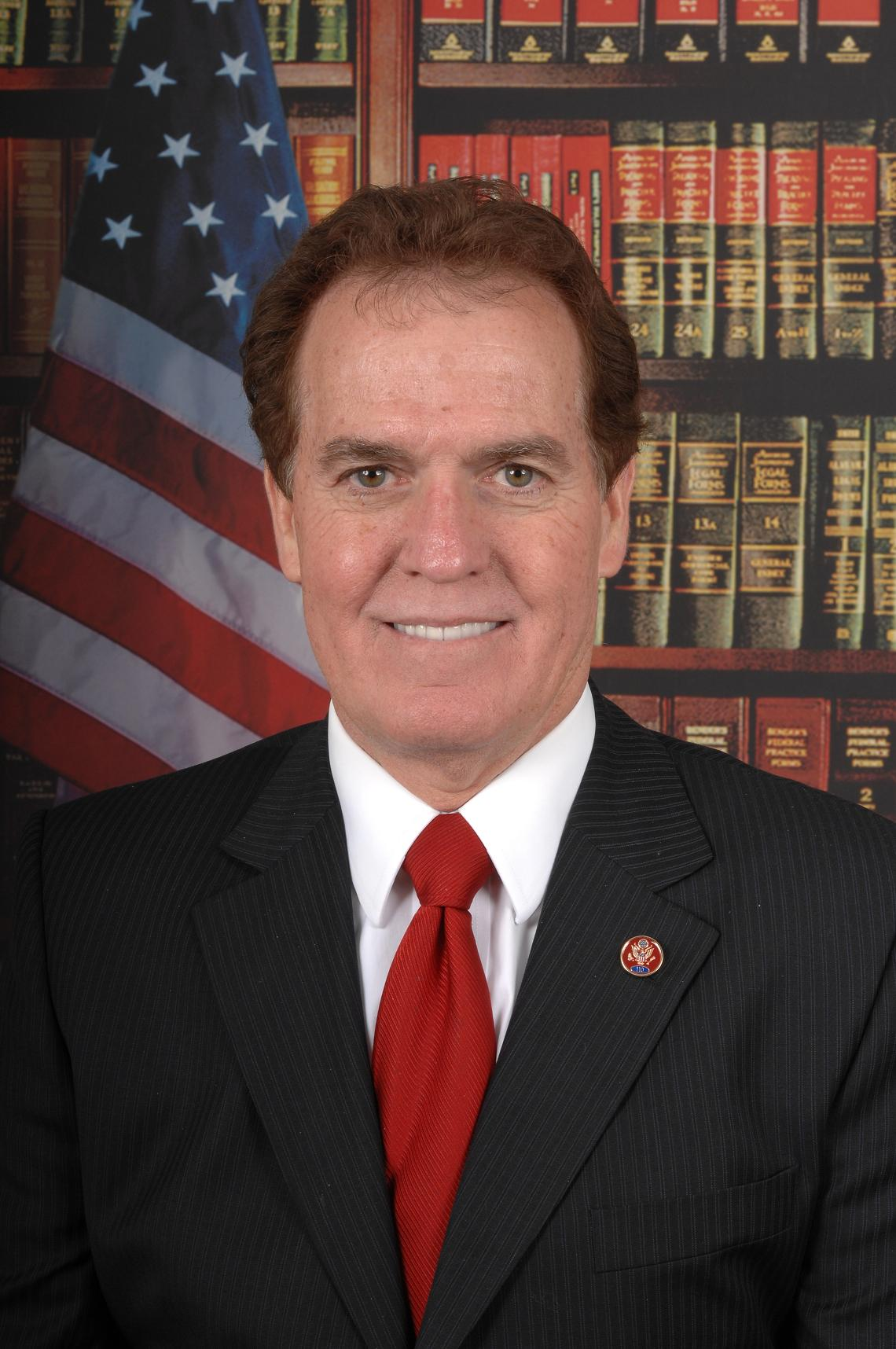

Member of the U.S. House of Representatives from Georgia's 11th district
- In office January 3, 2003 – January 3, 2015
- Preceded by: Bob Barr
- Succeeded by: Barry Loudermilk

Member of the Georgia Senate from the 37th district
- In office January 1999 – January 2003
- Preceded by: Chuck Clay
- Succeeded by: Chuck Clay

Personal details
- Born: John Phillip Gingrey; July 10, 1942 (age 84) Augusta, Georgia, U.S.
- Party: Republican
- Spouse: Billie Ayers
- Children: 4
- Education: Georgia Institute of Technology, Atlanta (BS); Augusta University (MD)

John Phillip Gingrey (born July 10, 1942) is an American physician and former politician who served as a U.S. representative for Georgia's 11th congressional district from 2003 to 2015. He is a member of the Republican Party (GOP). His district comprised the northwestern suburbs of Atlanta. Since leaving Congress, Gingrey has worked as a senior adviser at the District Policy Group in Washington, D.C., which is the lobbying arm of the Drinker Biddle law firm.

On March 27, 2013, Gingrey announced he would be a candidate in the 2014 race for U.S. Senate in his home state, he was unsuccessful, later losing in the May 20, 2014 Republican primary, placing fourth.

== Early life, education, and early political career ==
Gingrey was born and raised in Augusta, Georgia and graduated from Aquinas High School. He received a Bachelor of Science degree in chemistry from Georgia Tech in 1965, and then earned his M.D. from the Medical College of Georgia. He started his 26-year practice as an obstetrician/gynecologist. While at Georgia Tech, Gingrey was a driver of the Ramblin' Wreck mascot car. He also became a member of the Gamma Alpha chapter of the Sigma Nu fraternity and was the President of the fraternity his senior year.

Gingrey entered politics when he ran for the Marietta School Board, a body of which he was three times named chairman. He served two terms as a member of the Georgia State Senate from 1999 to 2003.

== U.S. House of Representatives ==
=== Elections ===
==== 2012 ====
In his final campaign for his U.S. House seat in 2012, Gingrey defeated Democrat Patrick Thompson with 68.6 percent of the vote.

Georgia’s 11th District U.S. House of Representatives election, 2012
Party	Candidate	Votes	%
Republican	Phil Gingrey	196,968	68.6
Democratic	Patrick Thompson	90,353	31.4
Total votes		287,321	100

==== 2010 ====
In 2010, Gingrey ran unopposed.

==== 2008 ====
Georgia’s 11th District U.S. House of Representatives election, 2008
Party	Candidate	Votes	%
Republican	Phil Gingrey	204,082	68.2
Democratic	Hugh "Bud" Gammon	95,220	31.8
Total votes		299,302	100

==== 2006 ====
Georgia’s 11th District U.S. House of Representatives election, 2008
Party	Candidate	Votes	%
Republican	Phil Gingrey	118,524	71.1
Democratic	Patrick Samuel Pillion	48,261	28.9
Total votes		166,785	100

==== 2004 ====
Georgia’s 11th District U.S. House of Representatives election, 2008
Party	Candidate	Votes	%
Republican	Phil Gingrey	120,696	57.4
Democratic	Rick Crawford	89,591	42.6
Total votes		210,287	100

==== 2002 ====
Georgia’s 11th District U.S. House of Representatives election, 2008
Party	Candidate	Votes	%
Republican	Phil Gingrey	69,427	51.6
Democratic	Roger Kahn	65,007	48.4
Total votes		134,434	100

=== Tenure ===
Gingrey was one of four OB/GYNs in the House of Representatives, the other three being fellow Republicans Michael Burgess of Texas, former Congressman Ron Paul of Texas, and Phil Roe of Tennessee. He is a founding member and co-chairman of the GOP Doctors Caucus, a group of 20 health care providers in the House of Representatives. The Caucus utilizes their medical expertise to develop and advocate for patient-centered health care reforms focused on quality, access, affordability, portability, and choice.

Stephen Colbert interviewed Gingrey on his Better Know a District segment. Colbert sarcastically asked, "The war in Iraq. Great War – or the greatest war?" Gingrey responded that it may be the greatest war. Colbert asked Gingrey if he was a "Georgia peach" and Gingrey responded in the affirmative.

In 2008 Gingrey signed a pledge sponsored by Americans for Prosperity promising to vote against any global warming legislation that would raise taxes.

==== Bank of Ellijay ====
In November 2011, it was reported that Gingrey allegedly received stock benefits, potentially in violation of congressional ethics rules, from his role as an investor and board member of two Georgia banks. One of these banks, Bank of Ellijay, failed in September 2010 and was taken over by regulators at a cost of $60 million to taxpayers. Gingrey's office denied any conflicts of interests. In December 2014, the House Ethics Committee publicly released findings that Gingrey had given special privilege to the Bank of Ellijay in TARP discussions, that Gingrey should not have aided the bank since it was not in his district. The committee told Gingrey: "It is true that you received no compensation or financial benefits as a result of these meetings."

Gingrey's attorney observed to the press:

Representative Gingrey assisted a bank he thought of as a constituent organization by having his office help set up informational meetings through which bank officers could inquire about how TARP funds were going to be allocated. It is undisputed that Representative Gingrey never sought any preferential treatment for anyone in obtaining TARP funding and did nothing further upon arranging the requested meetings.

==== Todd Akin for Senate campaign ====
Gingrey's office said that this comments were misconstrued after he was reported saying that former Republican representative Todd Akin was "partially right" in saying that a woman would not conceive after a "legitimate rape." Akin had been running for the U.S. Senate from Missouri; his campaign fell apart after he said the debunked claim that "the female body has ways to try to shut that whole thing down." At a local Chamber of Commerce meeting, Gingrey said that Akin wasn't entirely wrong. "I've delivered lots of babies, and I know about these things," Gingrey said, according to The Marietta Daily Journal.

Gingrey has been an OB-GYN since 1975. He had served as co-chair of the GOP Doctors Caucus.

==== Congressional and staff pay ====
In September 2013, he received intense criticism by Republican congressional aides when he observed that many congressional aides – who initially are somewhat relatively low paid – go on to careers as major lobbyists in Washington, D.C.'s K Street area (or elsewhere) and can eventually make hundreds of thousands of dollars, implying that his own congressional salary (he said $172,000; it is actually $174,000, not including other benefits) was somehow inadequate. Meanwhile, his constituents in Georgia have a median household income of about $49,000.

==== Ebola virus concerns ====
In July 2014, as concern over the Ebola virus epidemic in West Africa was in the USA media, Gingrey wrote a letter to the USA CDC, stating "Reports of illegal migrants carrying deadly diseases such as swine flu, dengue fever, Ebola virus and tuberculosis are particularly concerning."

=== Committee assignments ===
- Committee on Energy and Commerce
  - Subcommittee on Environment and Economy
  - Subcommittee on Health
  - Subcommittee on Oversight and Investigations
- House Armed Services Committee
- House Science Committee
- House Rules Committee
- Committee on House Administration

=== Caucus leaderships ===
- GOP Doctors Caucus, co-chair
- Immigration Reform Caucus, executive committee
- Congressional Vision Caucus, co-chair
- Congressional Constitution Caucus, member
- Congressional Immigration Reform Caucus, member

=== Commissioner ===
- Legislative Commissioner, Organization for Security and Cooperation in Europe, Helsinki Agreement

== 2014 U.S. Senate election ==
In March 2013, Gingrey officially announced he would run for the open senate seat vacated by Republican U.S. senator Saxby Chambliss. He was defeated in the Republican primary on May 20, 2014, coming in 4th in a field of eight.

== Post-political career ==
After leaving Congress, Gingrey joined The District Policy Group as a senior adviser. He writes a regular column on the firm's website called "Phil on the Hill" where he writes about policy topics such as health care, the federal budget, annual appropriations, regulatory reform, and life sciences. He is also a member of the ReFormers Caucus of Issue One.

He remains a licensed physician who practices on a volunteer basis for low-income Georgians at the Good Samaritan Clinic in Smyrna, Georgia.

=== Policy views ===
==== Children's Health Insurance Program ====
Gingrey supported the reauthorization of the federal Children's Health Insurance Program (CHIP), which is a program that provides matching funds to states for health insurance to families with children. The program was designed to provide health insurance to uninsured children in families with incomes that are modest but too high to qualify for Medicaid. In January 2018, Congress extended the program for six years. Gingrey wrote, "Reauthorizing CHIP is a smart move by Republicans to address to address the neediest and most vulnerable of our society. And why not? The recent CBO score shows that the program almost pays for itself, easing pressure off the need to find offsets."

==== Health care industry stability ====
In a "Phil on the Hill" column, Gingrey wrote that, "Health care is by its nature a dynamic and uncertain field. Researchers are always working to pull together grants to keep the centrifuges spinning and Bunsen burners burning. Hospitals must continually untie a tangle of HR, regulatory, budgetary and technology issues while delivering quality health care. Health care providers have to develop efficient business solutions that improve the quality of care and are tailored specifically to the individual communities they serve." Tasked with a constant juggling act, Gingrey wrote, health care leaders benefit when policies from the federal government are predictable and the government itself is stable. Gingrey argued that President Trump took a step toward promoting stability with his nomination of Alex Azar as the Secretary of Health and Human Services. Azar brings issue expertise, political know-how and ideas to the position, Gingrey wrote.

==== MedPAC ====
The Medicare Payment Advisory Center (MedPAC) is a nonpartisan federal advisory commission on federal government healthcare-related policy issues. Twice a year, MedPAC submits a report to Congress. It also supports the Medicare and Medicaid programs with analyses and recommendations. Gingrey supports MedPAC and has encouraged members of Congress and policymakers to utilize MedPAC's advice.

=== Media ===
Gingrey has written several op-eds for The Hill newspaper on a wide variety of topics.

In the summer of 2016, Gingrey wrote an op-ed about the opioid epidemic occurring in the U.S. To combat the epidemic, Gingrey wrote that he favors wider access to Naloxone (commonly known by its brand name Narcan) to save people who have overdosed, supports the Comprehensive Addiction and Recovery Act (CARA) which had recently passed Congress, encourages more states to adopt the Good Samaritan laws (laws that provide immunity for those who call 911 if they are witnessing or attending to an overdose), and public awareness education campaigns.

In January 2017, shortly before Donald Trump's inauguration, Gingrey wrote in support of Trump's pick of Tom Price as the Secretary of Health and Human Services (HHS). Not since President George H. W. Bush picked Dr. Louis Sullivan as the 17th HHS secretary in 1989 has there been a physician at the head of HHS. Gingrey and Price served together in the Georgia State Senate before serving in the U.S. House. "Through hard work, collaboration with colleagues, and levering his health policy expertise, he has earned the respect and admiration of his colleagues on both sides of the aisle," Gingrey wrote about Price.

In November 2017, Gingrey penned an op-ed where he argued that the government should not interfere with the patient-physician relationship. During the debate over Obamacare, one key issue of concern for physicians serving in Congress (such as Gingrey) was the promotion and utilization of cost-effectiveness data and "comparative effectiveness research" (CER). "We were concerned that such information would be used to support government takeover of the practice of medicine, and specifically that these types of analyses and studies would dictate decision-making to doctors," Gingrey wrote. As it turns out, he now supports the federal agency that the Affordable Care Act created that creates the CERs. He believes they are important decision-making tools for practitioners, and he supports reauthorization of the agency in 2019.

== Personal life ==
Gingrey is a Roman Catholic. He is married to the former Billie Ayers of Newnan, Georgia; they have four children and 13 grandchildren.

== See also ==
- Physicians in US Congress

U.S. House of Representatives
Preceded by John Linder	Member of the U.S. House of Representatives from Georgia's 11th congressional district 2003–2015	Succeeded by Barry Loudermilk
U.S. order of precedence (ceremonial)
Preceded by George Darden as Former U.S. Representative	Order of precedence of the United States as Former U.S. Representative	Succeeded by Lynn Westmoreland as Former U.S. Representative
