= Leader of Georgia =

Leader of Georgia may refer to:

- President of Georgia, head of state of the country of Georgia
- Prime Minister of Georgia, head of government of the country of Georgia
- Governor of Georgia, head of government of the U.S. state of Georgia

== See also ==
- List of leaders of Georgia (disambiguation)
