= Senator David =

Senator David may refer to:

== Mexico ==
- Sami David David (born 1950), senator for Chiapas in 1994–2000

== United States ==
- Kim David (born 1961), Oklahoma State Senate
- Thomas E. David (1920–1972), Florida State Senate

== See also ==
- Senator Davidson (disambiguation)
