= Oliver Bateman =

American politician (1923–2012)

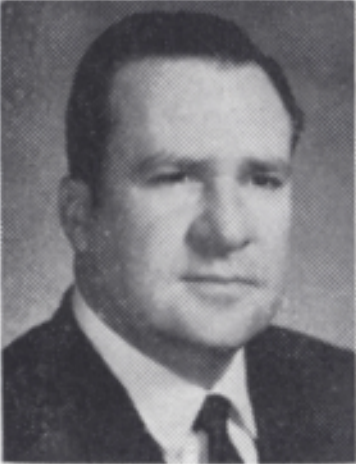

Member of the Georgia Senate from the 27th district
- In office January 11, 1965 – January 8, 1973
- Succeeded by: George N. Skene

Minority Leader of the Georgia Senate
- In office 1968–1973
- Succeeded by: William Armstrong Smith

Personal details
- Born: August 29, 1923 Walden, Georgia, U.S.
- Died: September 14, 2012 (aged 89) Macon, Georgia, U.S.
- Party: Republican

Oliver Cromwell Bateman (August 29, 1923 – September 14, 2012) was an American legislator who served in the Georgia State Senate from 1965 until 1973 and was minority leader from 1968 to 1973. He was born in Walden, Georgia. He was a graduate of The Citadel in 1948 and Harvard Business School in 1950. Bateman died in Macon, Georgia. He was a delegate to the 1968 Republican National Convention.

Georgia State Senate
Preceded by	Minority Leader of the Georgia Senate; 1968–1973	Succeeded by William Armstrong Smith
