= Herbert Clay =

American politician (1881–1923)

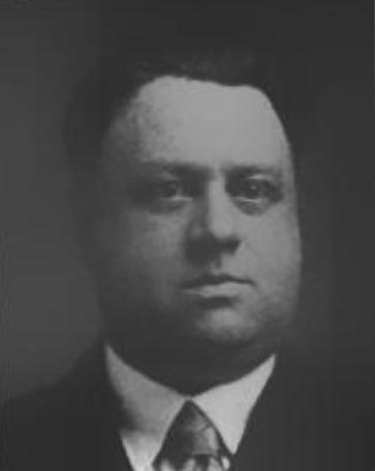

President of the Georgia State Senate
- In office June 22, 1921 – June 22, 1923
- Preceded by: Samuel L. Olive
- Succeeded by: George H. Carswell

Member of the Georgia State Senate from the 39th district
- In office June 22, 1921 – June 22, 1923
- Preceded by: Charles J. Harben
- Succeeded by: Pierce B. Latimer

Mayor of Marietta, Georgia
- In office 1911–1912
- Preceded by: E. P. Dobbs
- Succeeded by: J. J. Black

Personal details
- Born: Eugene Herbert Clay; October 3, 1881 Marietta, Georgia, U.S.
- Died: June 22, 1923 (aged 41) Atlanta, Georgia, U.S.
- Party: Democratic
- Spouses: Marjorie Lockwood (m. 1911, divorced); Virginia Hudson (m. 1919)
- Children: Eugene Jr.
- Parent: Alexander S. Clay (father)
- Relatives: Lucius D. Clay (brother)
- Education: University of Georgia; Mercer University (LLB)
- Occupation: Lawyer; politician

Eugene Herbert Clay (October 3, 1881 – June 22, 1923) was an American politician who served as the mayor of Marietta, Georgia. He was one of the ringleaders in the lynching of Leo Frank.

He was born in Marietta, Georgia to Senator Alexander S. Clay and Frances (née White) Clay. Clay attended the University of Georgia and the Mercer University, graduating in from the latter with an LL.B. He was a member of the Chi Phi fraternity. He served as the mayor of Marietta, Georgia from 1911 to 1912. He was twice elected Solicitor General of the Blue Ridge Circuit and served on the State Democratic Committee.

In 1915, he helped plan the lynching of Leo Frank, a Jewish-American factory superintendent whose murder conviction and extrajudicial hanging in 1915 by a lynch mob drew attention to questions of antisemitism in the United States.

He married Virginia Hudson of Pocahontas, Virginia, on December 27, 1919. He also had one son, Eugene Herbert Clay, Jr., by a prior marriage. In the fall of 1920, he was elected to the Georgia Senate. He was president of the Georgia Senate as of 1922. On June 22, 1923, Clay died suddenly of a heart attack in the Wilmot Hotel at Atlanta, Georgia.

His youngest brother was General Lucius D. Clay a senior officer of the United States Army who was later known for his administration of occupied Germany after World War II.
