= Lucius D. Clay Jr. =

United States Air Force general

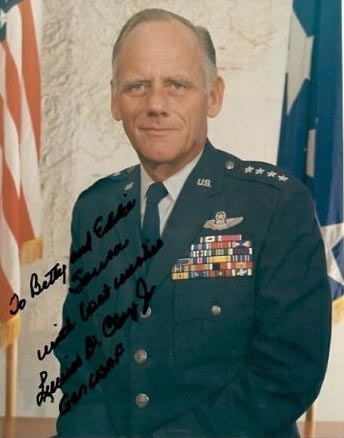
- General Lucius DuBignon Clay Jr.
- Born: July 6, 1919; Alexandria, Virginia
- Died: February 7, 1994 (aged 74); Fort Belvoir, Virginia
- Burial place: Arlington National Cemetery
- Relatives: Alexander Stephens Clay (grandfather); Lucius D. Clay (father); Frank Butner Clay (brother); Chuck Clay (son)
- Military career
- Allegiance: United States
- Branch: United States Army (1942–47); United States Air Force (1947–75)
- Service years: 1942–1975
- Rank: General
- Commands: North American Air Defense Command; Continental Air Defense Command; Aerospace Defense Command; Pacific Air Forces; Twelfth Air Force; Seventh Air Force
- Conflicts: World War II; Vietnam War
- Awards: Air Force Distinguished Service Medal (5); Legion of Merit; Distinguished Flying Cross; Bronze Star Medal; Air Medal (11); Purple Heart

General Lucius DuBignon Clay Jr. (July 6, 1919 – February 7, 1994) was a United States military leader who held the positions of commander-in-chief of the North American Air Defense Command, the Continental Air Defense Command, the United States element of NORAD, and was also a commander of the United States Air Force's Aerospace Defense Command. His father, Lucius D. Clay Sr. and his brother, Frank Butner Clay, were also both generals, and his grandfather was Senator Alexander Stephens Clay of Georgia.

== Early life and education ==
Clay was born in Alexandria, Virginia, in 1919, the son of then-2nd Lieutenant (later General) Lucius D. Clay Sr. He graduated from Western High School, Washington, D.C., in 1937, and from the United States Military Academy at West Point in 1942. He then entered flight training and received his pilot wings at Lubbock Field, Texas, in December 1942. He next attended Martin B-26 Marauder transition school at Fort Worth and Del Rio, Texas, where he later became an instructor.

== Military career ==
In June 1943 Clay went to MacDill Field, Florida and assumed command of the 616th Bombardment Squadron, and two months later joined the 495th Bombardment Squadron as assistant operations officer. He moved with the squadron to Drane Field, an auxiliary airfield of MacDill in Lakeland, Florida, then to Hunter Field, in Savannah, Georgia, and finally then to the European Theater of Operations.

From June 1944 to February 1946, Clay served with the 344th Bombardment Group as operations officer, squadron commander, and group commander. Following World War II, Clay remained in Germany and served as deputy commander and deputy for base services with the European Air Depot, Erding, Germany.

In February 1947 Clay returned to the United States to serve on the staff of the Deputy Chief of Staff, Operations for Atomic Energy, Headquarters U.S. Air Force. From June 1949 to May 1952, he was assigned to the Air War College and Air University at Maxwell Air Force Base, Alabama.

Clay returned to the Pentagon in June 1952 as an Air Force member of the Joint Strategic Plans Group in the Organization of the Joint Chiefs of Staff. He later was assigned as chief of the Joint Plans Division, Deputy Chief of Staff, Operations, Headquarters U.S. Air Force. He went to Ramey Air Force Base, Puerto Rico, in July 1956, where he served as deputy commander of the 72d Bombardment Wing. In May 1958 he was assigned to Headquarters, Strategic Air Command (SAC) at Offutt Air Force Base, Nebraska, as chief of the Plans Division.

From February 1961 to August 1964, Clay once again served with the Organization of the Joint Chiefs of Staff. His first assignment was as a member of the Joint War Games Control Group, and later he served as deputy director for operations. In August 1964 he was transferred to Waco, Texas, as vice commander, Twelfth Air Force, Tactical Air Command (TAC), and in January 1966 he was named commander.

In July 1966 Clay returned to Headquarters U.S. Air Force to become director of plans under the Deputy Chief of Staff for Plans and Operations; in August 1967 was assigned as director of aerospace programs, deputy chief of staff for programs and resources; in August 1968 assumed the position of deputy chief of staff, programs and resources; and in August 1969 became deputy chief of staff, plans and operations.

Clay was assigned as vice commander in chief, Pacific Air Forces (PACAF), from February 1970 to September 1, 1970 when he assumed command of Seventh Air Force with headquarters at Tan Son Nhut Air Base, Republic of Vietnam. He also was deputy commander for air operations, Military Assistance Command, Vietnam. As Seventh Air Force commander, he was responsible for all Air Force combat air strike, air support and air defense operations in mainland Southeast Asia. In his MACV capacity he advised on all matters pertaining to effective use of tactical air support and coordinated Vietnamese air force and United States air operations of all units in the MACV area of responsibility. General Clay became commander in chief, Pacific Air Forces, in August 1971.

Clay assumed his position as commander in chief, North American Air Defense Command/Continental Air Defense Command and as commander, Aerospace Defense Command, October 1, 1973. He retired from the Air Force on August 1, 1975.

== Awards and decorations ==
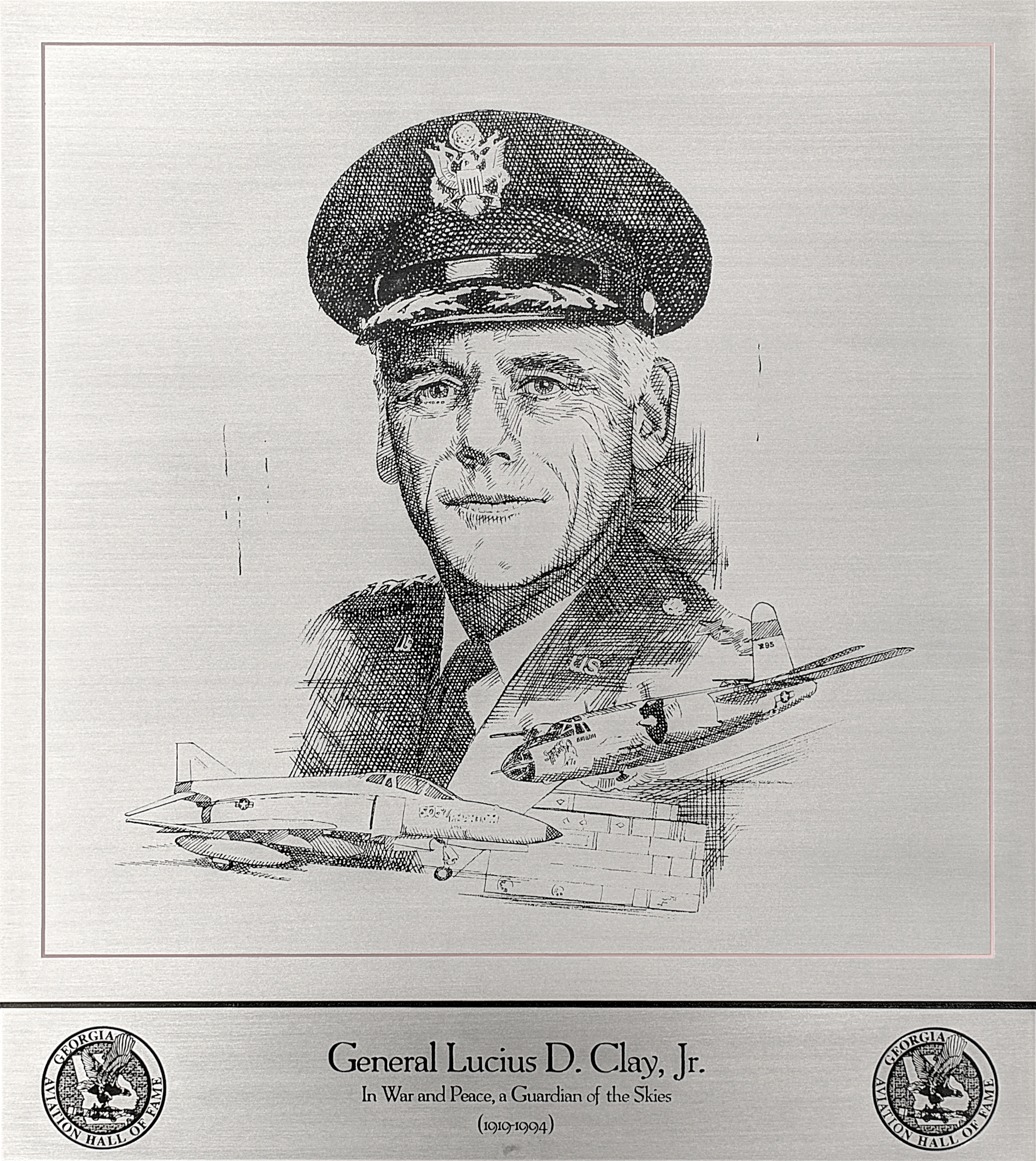
Plaque of Gen. Clay at the Georgia Aviation Hall of Fame

Clay's military decorations and awards include: the Air Force Distinguished Service Medal with four oak leaf clusters; Legion of Merit; Distinguished Flying Cross; Bronze Star Medal; Air Medal with 10 oak leaf clusters; Joint Service Commendation Medal with oak leaf cluster; Army Commendation Medal; Purple Heart; Croix de Guerre with Étoile de vermeil (France) with Gold Star; National Order of Vietnam, Third Class; Republic of Vietnam Air Force Distinguished Service Order, First Class; Korea National Security Medal; and Republic of Vietnam Cross of Gallantry. He was a command pilot. In 1997 he was inducted into the Georgia Aviation Hall of Fame.

== Death and burial ==
Clay died at the military retirement community at Fort Belvoir, Virginia. Clay was buried alongside his wife at Arlington National Cemetery.
