= Alexander S. Clay =

American politician

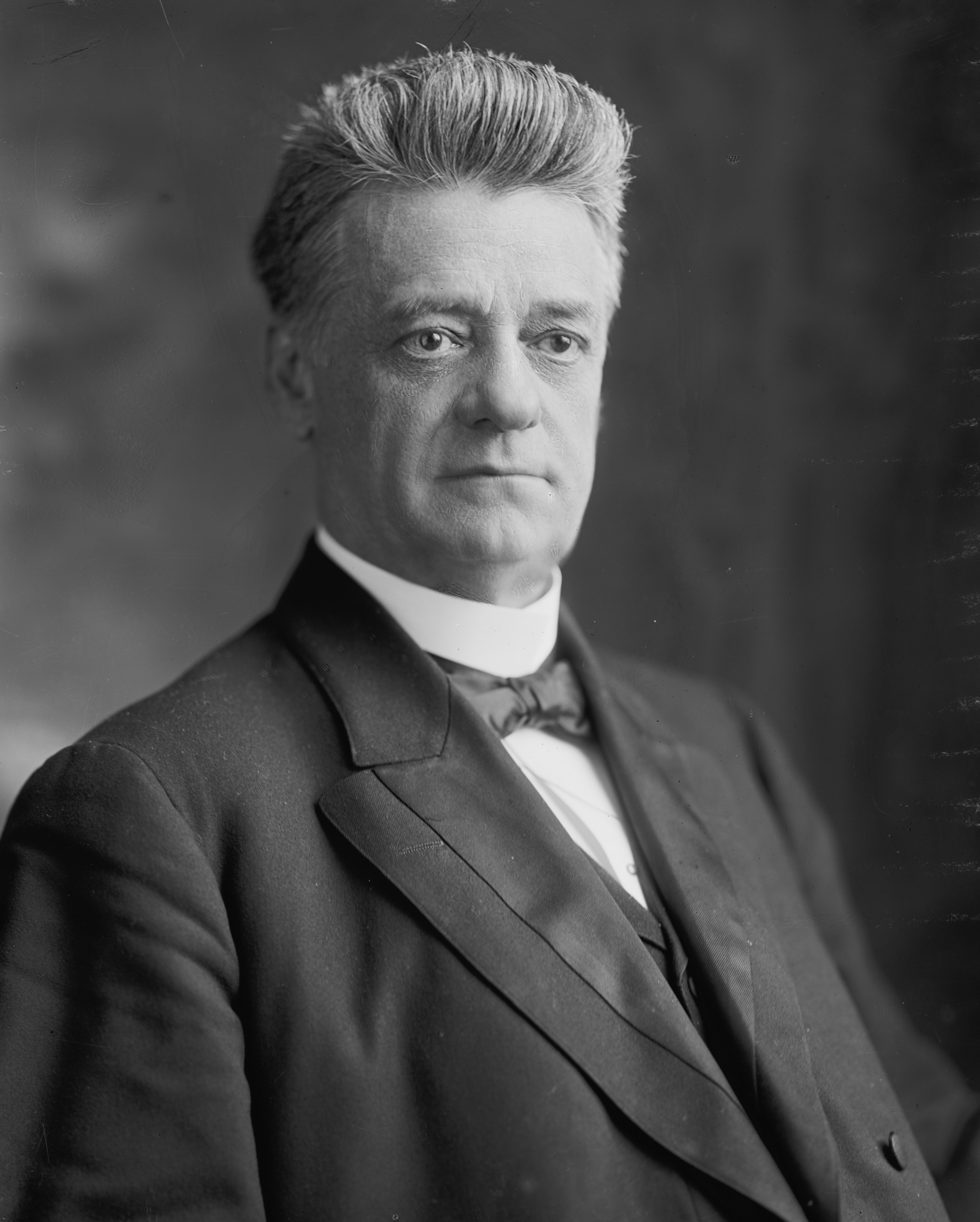

United States Senator from Georgia
- In office March 4, 1897 – November 13, 1910
- Preceded by: John B. Gordon
- Succeeded by: Joseph M. Terrell

Member of the Georgia House of Representatives
- In office 1884-1887; 1889-1890

Personal details
- Born: Alexander Stephens Clay; September 25, 1853 Powder Springs, Georgia, U.S.
- Died: November 13, 1910 (aged 57) Atlanta, Georgia, U.S.
- Party: Democratic

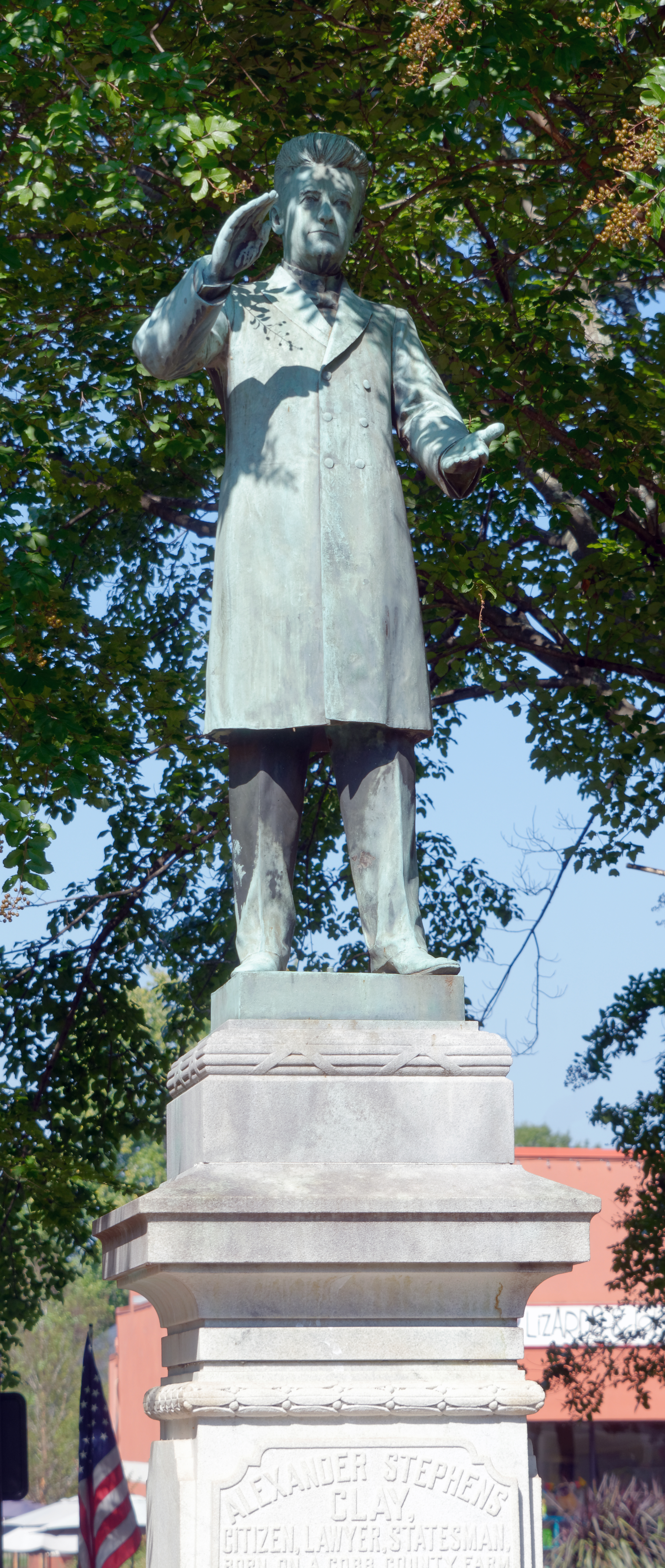
Statue of Clay in Marietta, Georgia

Alexander Stephens Clay (September 25, 1853 – November 13, 1910) was a United States senator from Georgia.

== Biography ==
Clay was born in Powder Springs, Georgia, and graduated from Hiwassee College in Tennessee in 1875. He was admitted to the bar in 1877 and commenced practice in Marietta, Georgia. He served on the Marietta city council in 1880 and 1881.

Clay was a member of the Georgia House of Representatives from 1884 to 1887 and 1889 to 1890, and served as speaker pro tempore in 1886 to 1887 and 1889 to 1890. He was a member of the Georgia Senate from 1892 to 1894 and served as its president for his last two years in that body. In 1896 Clay was elected to the U.S. Senate and reelected twice (in 1902 and 1908). As a U.S. senator, Clay served as chair of the Committee on Revolutionary Claims and as a member of the Committee on Woman Suffrage.

Clay died in Atlanta while in office in 1910 and was buried in the City Cemetery in Marietta. Joseph M. Terrell was appointed to fulfill the remainder of Clay's term.

== Family relationships ==
One son was General Lucius D. Clay, and another son was Eugene Herbert Clay.

Two grandsons were General Lucius D. Clay Jr. and Major General Frank Butner Clay.

== See also ==
- List of members of the United States Congress who died in office (1900–1949)

U.S. Senate
| Preceded by John B. Gordon | U.S. senator (Class 3) from Georgia; 1897–1910; Served alongside: Augustus O. Bacon | Succeeded by Joseph M. Terrell |
