= List of minority leaders of the Georgia State Senate =

This is a list of minority leaders of the Georgia State Senate:

Name	Took office	Left office	Party/Caucus
Oliver Bateman	1968	1973	Republican
William Armstrong Smith	1973	1975	Republican
Paul Coverdell	1975	1989	Republican
Tom Phillips	1989	?	Republican
Chuck Clay	?	1999	Republican
Eric Johnson	1999	2003	Republican
Michael Meyer von Bremen	2003	2009	Democratic
Robert Brown	2009	2011	Democratic
Steve Henson	2011	2021	Democratic
Gloria Butler	2021	2025	Democratic
Harold V. Jones II	2025	Incumbent	Democratic

== See also ==
- List of Georgia state legislatures
