= Frank Butner Clay =

United States Army general

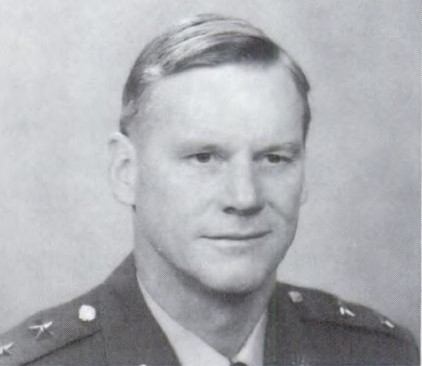
- Born: February 26, 1921; Auburn, Alabama, U.S.
- Died: December 30, 2006 (aged 85); Washington, D.C., U.S.
- Relatives: General Lucius D. Clay (father); General Lucius D. Clay Jr. (brother)
- Military career
- Allegiance: United States
- Branch: United States Army
- Service years: 1942–1973
- Rank: Major General
- Conflicts: World War II; Vietnam War
- Awards: Army Distinguished Service Medal; Silver Star (3); Legion of Merit; Distinguished Flying Cross; Bronze Star Medal (3); Purple Heart (2); Air Medal (15)

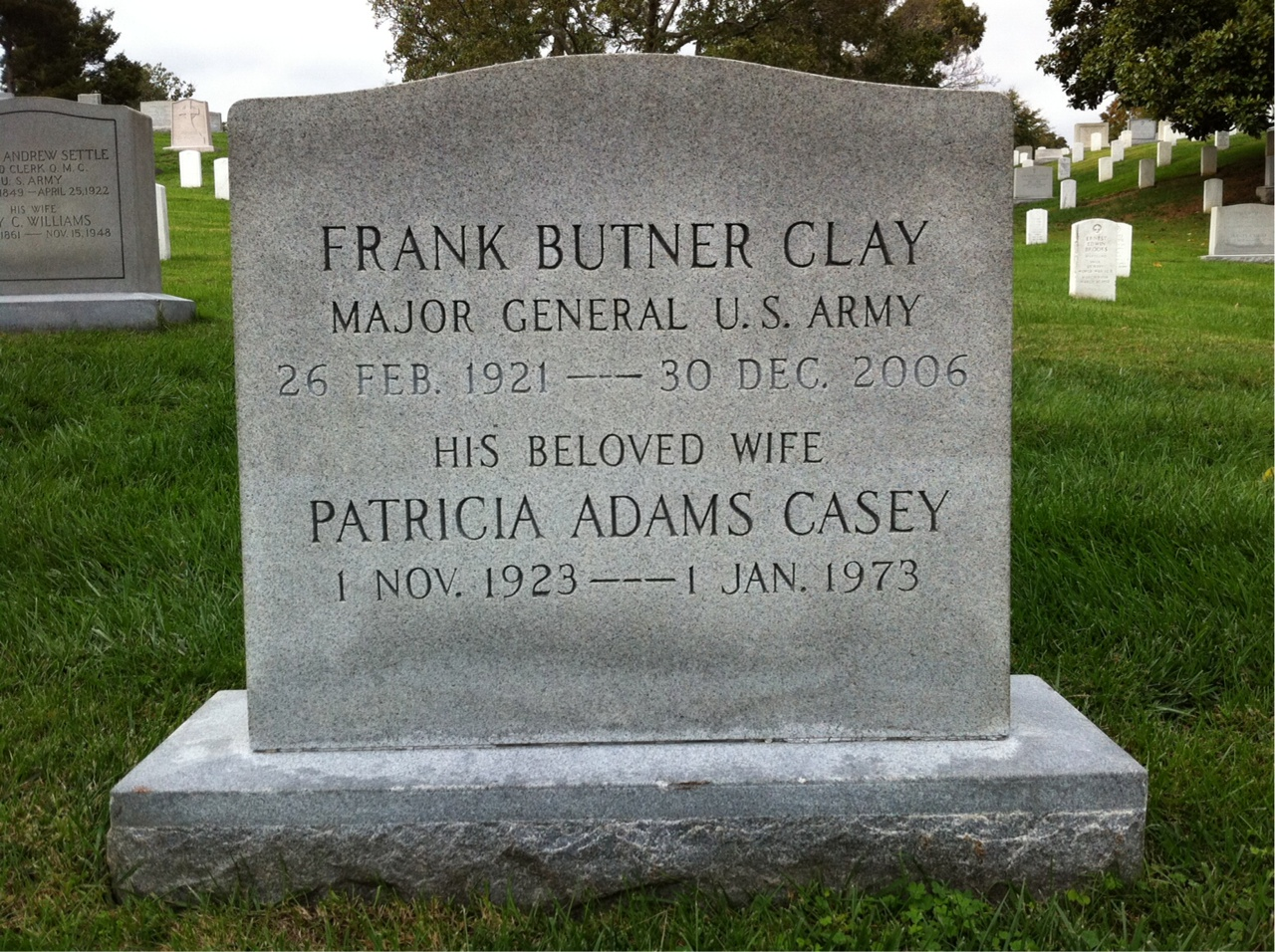
Grave at Arlington National Cemetery

Major General Frank Butner Clay (February 26, 1921 – December 30, 2006) was a United States Army officer. He was the son of General Lucius D. Clay Sr. and the brother of General Lucius D. Clay Jr. He is buried at Arlington National Cemetery along with his first wife, Patricia Adams Casey Clay (November 1, 1923 – January 1, 1973). Patricia Clay was the sister of Major Hugh Boyd Casey, who was killed in an airplane crash while serving as an aide-de-camp to the 3d Infantry Division Commander during the Korean War. They were, in turn, the children of Major General Hugh John Casey of the Army Corps of Engineers, who was the West Point roommate and good friend of General Lucius D. Clay Sr.

Clay attended the Valley Forge Military Academy and graduated from Millard Prep School. Appointed to the United States Military Academy from New York state, he graduated with a B.S. degree in May 1942. Clay later graduated the Command and General Staff College in 1952 and the National War College in 1961.

General Clay served in various positions from World War II through the Vietnam War. In 1971, he was a military advisor to the US delegation to the Paris peace talks. General Clay retired from the Army in 1973. He became the Deputy Assistant Secretary of Defense for Drug and Alcohol Abuse on July 11, 1973.

He died at the Knollwood Military Retirement Residence in Washington, D.C. and is buried along with his first wife at Arlington National Cemetery.

== Awards and decorations ==
He was awarded the Distinguished Service Medal, the Silver Star with two Oak Leaf Clusters, the Legion of Merit, the Distinguished Flying Cross, the Bronze Star Medal with V and two Oak Leaf Clusters and the Purple Heart with Oak Leaf Cluster.
