= Eric Johnson (Georgia politician) =

American politician (born 1953)

Member of the Georgia State Senate from the 1st district
- In office January 9, 1995 – September 15, 2009
- Preceded by: Tom Coleman Jr.
- Succeeded by: Buddy Carter

Member of the Georgia House of Representatives from the 153rd district
- In office January 11, 1993 – January 9, 1995
- Preceded by: Jack Kingston
- Succeeded by: Burke Day

Personal details
- Born: August 20, 1953 (age 73) New Orleans, Louisiana, U.S.
- Party: Republican
- Spouse: Kathryn
- Children: Righton (attorney), Marcus (minister)
- Profession: Architect

Eric Johnson (born August 20, 1953) is an American politician who served in the Georgia State Senate representing the 1st District, comprising all of Bryan and Liberty counties and part of Chatham County. He resigned his seat in 2009, after years in the Georgia General Assembly, to be a candidate to succeed term-limited Sonny Perdue for Governor of Georgia in 2010.

A Republican, he was first elected to the Georgia House of Representatives in 1992, giving up his seat after one term to run for the state senate. He was re-elected to the state senate in 1996. His colleagues voted him as the Minority Leader in 1998; he served until 2003. In 2003, following the 2002 election of the first Republican Governor in over 130 years, several Democrats changed parties and Republicans gained the state senate majority. Johnson was elected as the Senate President Pro Tempore. The Republican majority stripped Democratic Lieutenant Governor Mark Taylor of most of his powers, so for all intents and purposes Johnson served as lieutenant governor. The power of the lieutenant governor was restored back to current lieutenant governor Casey Cagle, a Republican, in 2007.

== Background ==
He was born in New Orleans, Louisiana, and is of the Christian faith. He makes his career as an architect.

== Education ==
Johnson graduated with a bachelor's and master's degree in architecture from Tulane University in 1976.

== Career ==
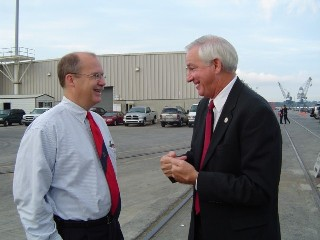
Johnson speaks with Max Burns at the Georgia Ports Authority in Savannah, 2003

Johnson is a Republican and served as a member of the Georgia House of Representatives from 1993 to 1995. He represented the 1st District in the Georgia State Senate beginning in 1995, and became the institution's President Pro Tempore in 2005.

Over the years, his committee assignments have included Appropriations, Assignments, Banking & Financial Institutions, Consumer Affairs, Economic Development, Tourism & Cultural Affairs, Ethics, Finance & Public Utilities, Natural Resources and the Environment, Regulated Industries and Utilities, Rules and Transportations.

== Election history ==
Year	District	Republican	Votes	Percent	Democrat	Votes	Percent
1998	1	Johnson	22,789	71.0%	Edenfield	9,324	29.0%
2000	1	Johnson	36,170	100%	–	–	–
2002	1	Johnson	39,083	100%	–	–	–
2004	1	Johnson	41,240	71.9%	Templeton	16,086	28.1%
2006	1	Johnson	30,811	100%	–	–	–
2008	1	Johnson	58,467	100%	–	–	–

== Campaign for governor ==
In 2009, Johnson filed paperwork with the Georgia State Ethics Commission to run for governor in 2010. He came up short in the Republican primary, finishing just short of the runoff to Karen Handel and Nathan Deal.

Georgia House of Representatives
Preceded by Jack Kingston	Member of the Georgia House of Representatives from the 153rd district 1993–1995	Succeeded by Burke Day
Georgia State Senate
Preceded by Tom Coleman Jr.	Member of the Georgia State Senate from the 1st district 1995–2009	Succeeded by Buddy Carter
Preceded by Sallie Newbill	Minority Whip of the Georgia State Senate; 1997–1999	Succeeded by Tom Price
Preceded by Chuck Clay	Minority Leader of the Georgia State Senate; 1999–2003	Succeeded by Michael Meyer von Bremen
Preceded by Terrell Starr	President pro tempore of the Georgia State Senate; 2003–2009	Succeeded by Tommie Williams
