= John S. Davidson =

Member of the Georgia State Senate

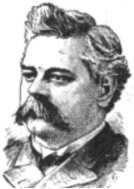

Member of the Georgia State Senate
- In office 1883–1884, 1886–1887
- Constituency: 10th District

Personal details
- Born: John Sheldon Davidson; June 17, 1846 Augusta, Georgia
- Died: March 11, 1894 (aged 47) Augusta, Georgia
- Occupation: Educator, journalist, lawyer, politician

John Sheldon Davidson (1846–1894) was an American educator, journalist, lawyer, and politician.

== Early life ==
John S. Davidson was born and reared in Augusta, Georgia. Leaving school in 1864, he became co-editor of the Augusta Constitutionalist. He began reading law in 1866, and was admitted to the bar before turning 21.

== Educator ==
Davidson was elected to the Board of Education for Richmond County in 1871 and was credited for helping lay a solid foundation for the present comprehensive system of public education in Richmond County. He served on the board for 21 years, 15 of which he served as president. He is still known as the "Father of Education in Richmond County." John S. Davidson Fine Arts Magnet School is named in his memory.

== Freemason leader ==
For seven terms John S. Davidson was Master of Webb Lodge No. 166, of Augusta (1875–1881) and in 1883 enjoyed a distinction known only twice in the history of Georgia Masonry, that of being elected from the floor of the Grand Lodge of Georgia to its highest office, "Most Worshipful Grand Master", and served from 1883 until his death in 1894. He is the namesake of the John S. Davidson Masonic Lodge #677.

== Political career ==
In 1883, he was chosen to represent the Tenth District of the Georgia State Senate, and in 1886 was unanimously elected president of the assemblage. Historical opinions state that he was "one of the finest presiding officers who had ever wielded the gavel in Georgia legislative halls."

== Death ==
John S. Davidson died in Augusta on March 11, 1894.
