= Lucius D. Clay =

United States Army general (1898–1978)

Lucius Clay
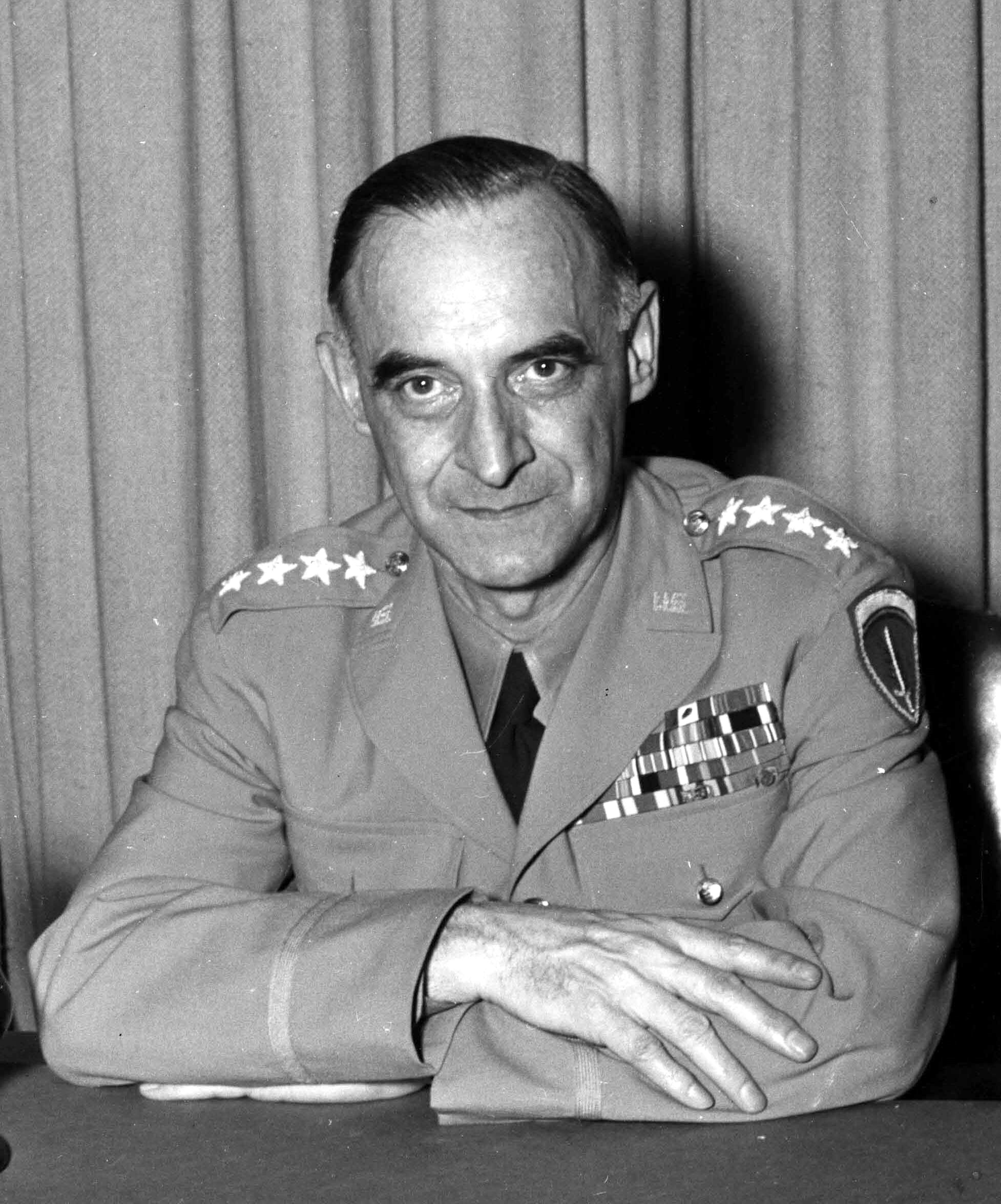
- Clay in 1949
- Born: Lucius Dubignon Clay; 23 April 1898; Marietta, Georgia, U.S.
- Died: 16 April 1978 (aged 79); Chatham, Massachusetts, U.S.
- Burial place: West Point Cemetery
- Education: United States Military Academy (BS)
- Children: Lucius; Frank
- Relatives: Alexander S. Clay (father); Eugene Clay (brother); Henry Clay (ancestor)
- Military career
- Allegiance: United States
- Branch: United States Army
- Service years: 1918–1949
- Rank: General
- Nickname: The Great Uncompromiser
- Commands: European Command; Normandy Base Section
- Conflicts: World War II
- Awards: Army Distinguished Service Medal (3); Legion of Merit; Bronze Star Medal

Lucius Dubignon Clay (23 April 1898 – 16 April 1978) was a senior officer of the United States Army who was known for his administration of occupied Germany after World War II. He served as the deputy to General of the Army Dwight D. Eisenhower in 1945; deputy military governor, Germany, in 1946; Commander in Chief, United States Forces in Europe and military governor of the United States Zone, Germany, from 1947 to 1949. Clay orchestrated the Berlin Airlift (1948–1949) when the USSR blockaded West Berlin.

== Early life ==
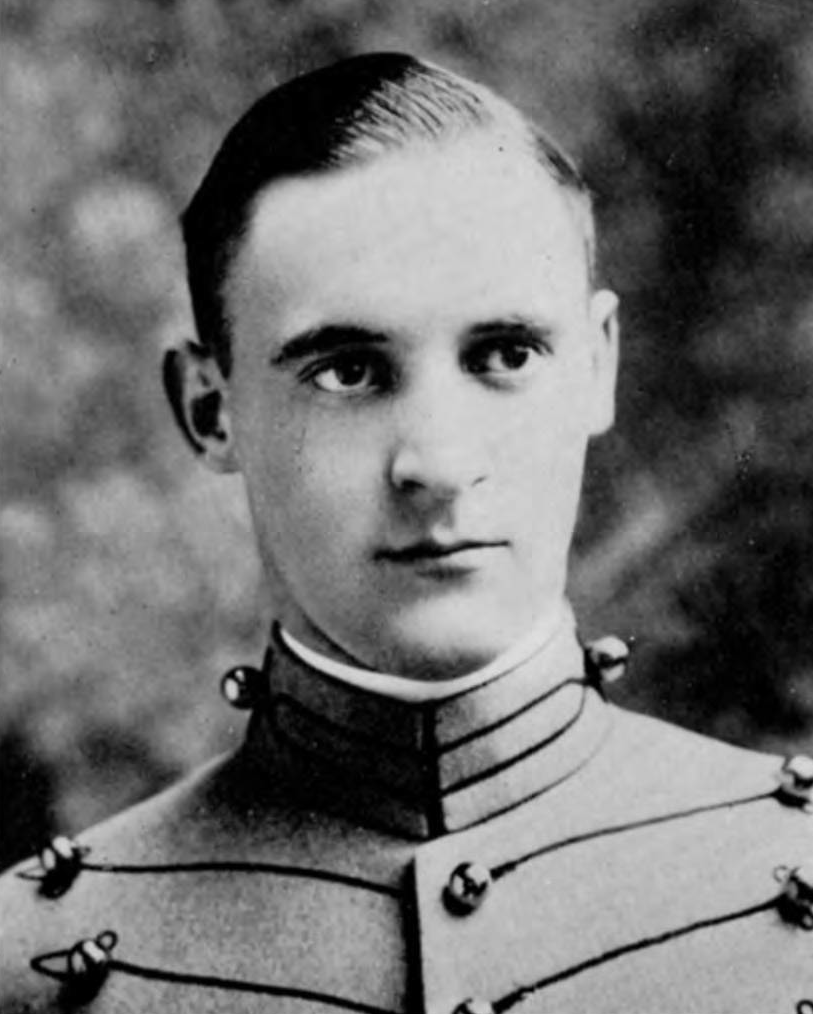
At West Point in 1918

Clay was born on April 23, 1898, in Marietta, Georgia, the sixth and last child of Alexander S. Clay, who served in the United States Senate from 1897 to 1910. In 1918 Clay graduated from West Point, where he later taught.

== Early career ==
Clay held various civil and military engineering posts in the 1920s and 1930s, such as directing the construction of dams and civilian airports. Because Clay's work involved large government projects, he became closely acquainted with the people and workings of the federal agencies and Congress. He achieved close working relationships with an associate of President Franklin Roosevelt, Harry Hopkins, and with House Majority Leader and Speaker Sam Rayburn. In Rayburn's state of Texas, Clay supervised the building of the Denison Dam. At the time of its completion, in 1943, it was the largest earthen dam in the world. From 1940 to the December 1941 attack on Pearl Harbor, Clay selected and supervised the construction of 450 airports, which were the foundation of America's civil aviation network. This initiative was, however, criticised for pork barrel spending, as Clay's home state of Georgia was granted 33 airports, a number that overstated the state's importance economically, militarily, and demographically.

== World War II ==
By March 1942, Clay had risen to the position of being the youngest brigadier general in the army, a month short of his 44th birthday. All the while, he had acquired a reputation for bringing order and operational efficiency out of chaos, and for being an exceptionally hard and disciplined worker, who went long hours and "considered lunch a waste of time".

Clay did not see actual combat but was awarded the Legion of Merit in 1942 and the Army Distinguished Service Medal in 1944 and received the Bronze Star Medal for his action in stabilizing the French harbor of Cherbourg, which was critical to the flow of war matériel. In 1945, he served as deputy to General Dwight Eisenhower. The following year, he was made Deputy Governor of Germany during the Allied Military Government.

Clay would later remark regarding the occupation directive guiding his and Eisenhower's actions that "there was no doubt that JCS 1067 contemplated the Carthaginian peace which dominated our operations in Germany during the early months of occupation."

== OMGUS and Cold War ==
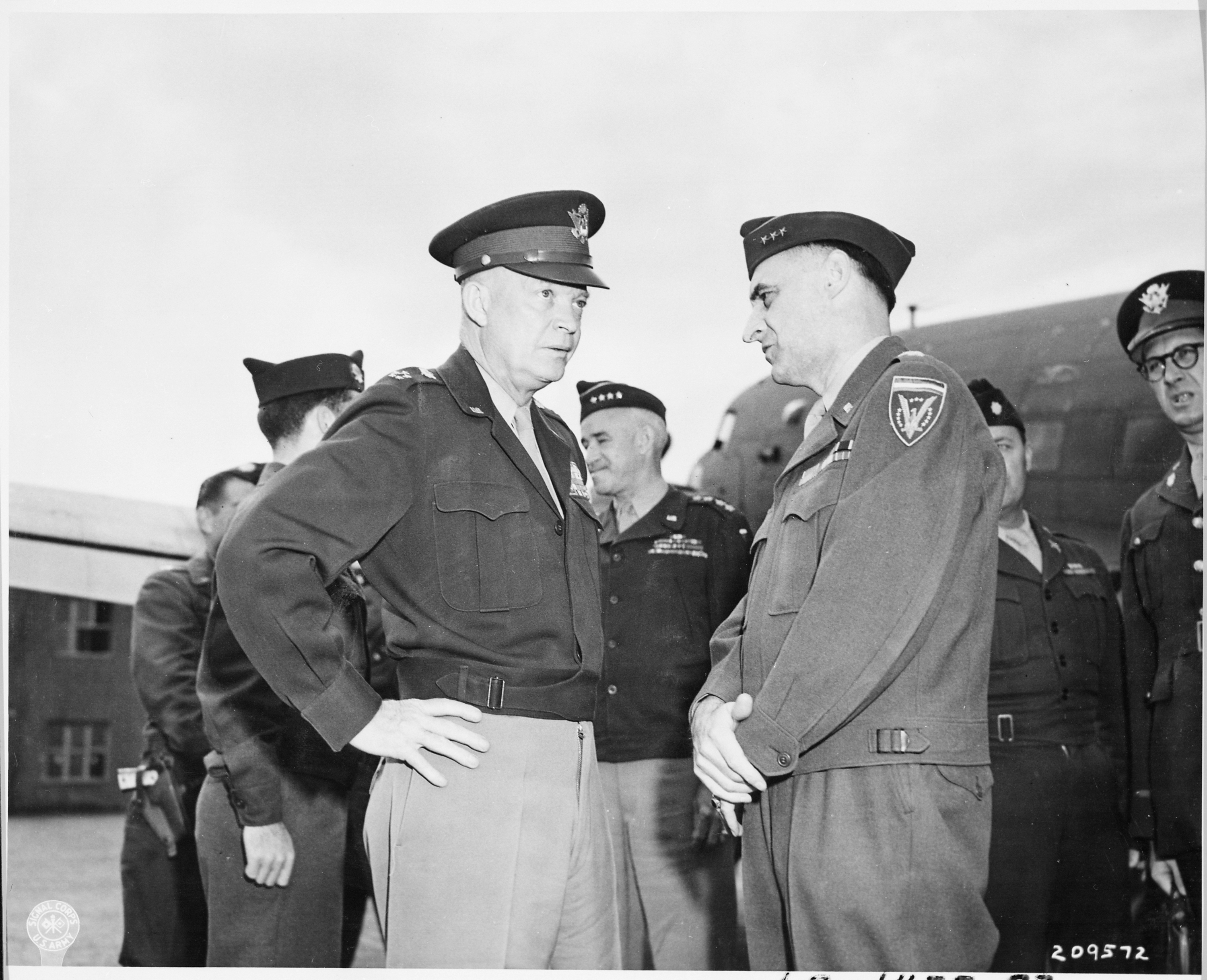
Clay with General of the Army Eisenhower at Gatow Airport in Berlin during the Potsdam Conference in 1945

Clay was promoted to lieutenant general on 17 April 1945 and to general on 17 March 1947.

Clay heavily influenced US Secretary of State James F. Byrnes' September 1946 speech in Stuttgart, Germany. The speech, "Restatement of Policy on Germany," marked the formal transition in American occupation policy away from the Morgenthau Plan of economic dismantlement to one of economic reconstruction.

On 15 March 1947, Clay succeeded Joseph T. McNarney as military governor (or "high commissioner") of the US zone of occupied Germany—the head of the OMGUS, the "Office of Military Government, United States." Clay's responsibilities covered a wide spectrum of social issues related to Germany's recovery from the war in addition to strictly military issues. He commissioned Lewis H. Brown to research and write "A Report on Germany", which served as a detailed recommendation for the reconstruction of postwar Germany and served as a basis for the Marshall Plan. Clay promoted democratic federalism in Germany and resisted US politicians who sought to undo a constitution that a Constituent Assembly in Bavaria had adopted on 26 October 1946. He also closed the borders of the American Zone in 1947 to stem the tide of Jewish refugees that was generating tension with the local populations.

=== Treatment of Nazis during governorship ===
Clay was responsible for the controversial commuting of some death sentences, such as convicted Nazi war criminals Erwin Metz and his superior, Hauptmann Ludwig Merz. Metz and Merz were two notorious figures of the Berga concentration camp in which 350 U.S. POWs had been beaten, tortured, starved, and forced to work for the German government during World War II. The soldiers were singled out for looking or sounding Jewish. At least 70 U.S. POWs soldiers died in the camp and on a death march near the end of the war. The commutation was partly due to the military botching the case. Prosecutors did not summon a single witness, despite dozens of witnesses saying they were willing to testify.

Clay also reduced the sentence of Ilse Koch, the "Beast of Buchenwald", who had been convicted of murder at the Nuremberg trials, and who had been accused of having gloves and lampshades made from prisoners' skin. Clay later said he commuted Koch's sentence since none of the documents about Koch actually mentioned the fact or included any evidence of her committing murder. The reductions in sentences were based on the hasty convictions of some Buchenwald personnel following the end of the war. Evidence was sometimes questionable, and many witnesses claimed to have been beaten by Allied interrogators. Clay confirmed several death sentences as valid, commuted several, and had some like Koch released after they had served a reduced sentence because of questionable evidence. Under the pressure of public opinion, Koch was rearrested in 1949, tried before a West German court, and, on 15 January 1951, sentenced to life imprisonment.

According to BBC journalist Tom Bower, despite Clay's mixed record, he was one of only two prominent American and British officials, the other being British diplomat Patrick Dean, who were both competent and showed some level of genuine commitment to denazification. According to Donald Bloxham, Clay's influence was crucial to American occupation authorities prosecuting major Nazi war criminals on their own in the Subsequent Nuremberg trials.

In 1946, Clay announced to western German officials that he was disappointed with their results from denazification tribunals:

"I do not see how you can demonstrate your ability for self-government nor your will for democracy if you are going to evade or shirk the first unpleasant and difficult task that falls upon you. Unless there is real and rapid improvement, I can only assume that German administration is unwilling to accept this responsibility."

The results temporarily improved after Clay ordered them to make improvements within 60 days. In late 1948, Clay admitted he did not enjoy, in his position as Military Governor, having to regularly "sign many death warrants and to approve many life imprisonments." Nevertheless, he was willing to and did approve most death sentences imposed by American military tribunals. He also approved all but one of the sentences imposed in the Subsequent Nuremberg trials.

Near the end of the occupation, Clay openly admitted his hopes for denazification were failing. In early 1948, a blanket stay of execution had been granted to all of the Nazi war criminals on death row in the U.S. occupation zone, with the exception of the seven defendants condemned at the Doctors' Trial. This came after false allegations of torture were propagated by several politicians in the United States, notably Senator Joseph McCarthy. In October 1948, however, the stay was removed for nearly everyone, excluding those convicted in the Malmedy massacre trial. Upon the lifting of the stay, Clay embarked on a spate of last-minute mass executions, believing that as time passed, pressure would increase for the death sentences to be commuted. In response, the German Catholic priests started objecting to not only the executions, but the prosecutions of war criminals outright. However, their pleas failed to convince Clay to halt the executions. Between October 1948 and March 1949, over 100 Nazi war criminals convicted by U.S. military tribunals were hanged at Landsberg Prison.

=== Berlin Airlift ===
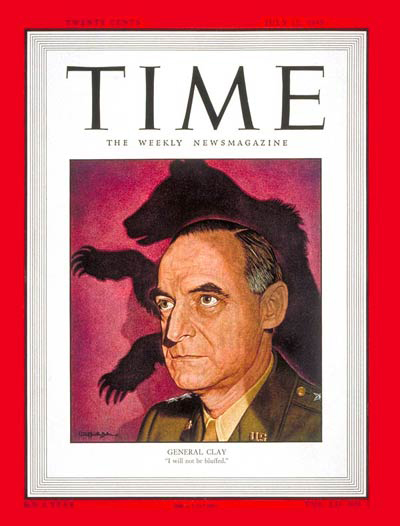
Clay on the cover of Time on 12 July 1948

On 25 June 1948, one day after the Soviets imposed the Berlin Blockade, Clay gave the order for the Berlin Airlift, which was only later authorized by President Harry Truman.

Clay is remembered for ordering and maintaining the airlift, which would ultimately last 324 days and ended on 30 September 1949. He resigned his post days after the blockade had been lifted on 12 May 1949.

== Later career ==
On 15 May 1949, Clay left Germany and was replaced by John McCloy as civilian high commissioner for Germany. Clay retired from the Army at the end of the month. In the same year, he was elected as an honorary member of the North Carolina Society of the Cincinnati. In 1950, he became the chairman of the Continental Can Company for 12 consecutive years. He retired from Continental Can in 1962 to become a senior partner in Lehman Brothers investment banking house until his retirement in 1973.

=== Cultural cold war ===
Meanwhile, Clay hired the American intellectual and former Army combat historian Melvin J. Lasky. Both developed the concept of a "cultural cold war" through which the Soviets would be fought at a psychological and intellectual level. Clay was instrumental in creating, funding, and promoting Der Monat, a journal intended to support US foreign policy and win over German intellectuals. Copies of Der Monat were delivered along with supplies during the airlift.

Clay also studied television propaganda and suggested that in Europe "you get this constant repeated propaganda without advertising and without break," but in the United States, "the advertising gives you a direct feeling of assurance that you haven't got propaganda in the program being thrown at you."

=== Eisenhower administration and Crusade for Freedom ===
Ich bin ein Berliner (I am a Berliner) speech
Speech from the Rathaus Schöneberg by John F. Kennedy, 26 June 1963. Duration 9:01.

Ich bin ein Berliner ("I am a Berliner") speech (audio)
Audio-only version (Duration 9:22)

After OMGUS ended, Clay served the United States in other capacities. He had previous experience in 1933 with managing and organizing projects under the New Deal and later became one of Dwight Eisenhower's closest advisers and assisted him in securing the 1952 Republican nomination and helping him select members of his cabinet upon ascension to the presidency. When Eisenhower was in office, Clay served as his unofficial emissary in Europe. One of his first duties as Eisenhower's emissary and, as the national chairman of the Crusade for Freedom, was to dedicate the city of Berlin's Liberty Bell. In 1954, he was called upon by Eisenhower to help forge a plan for financing the proposed Interstate highway system.

During the Berlin Crisis of 1961, President John F. Kennedy asked him to be an adviser and to go to Berlin and report on the situation. Two years later Clay accompanied Kennedy on his trip to Berlin. During his famous Ich bin ein Berliner speech, Kennedy said, "I am proud .. to come here in the company of my fellow American, General Clay, who has been in this city during its great moments of crisis and will come again if ever needed." That mention triggered enthusiastic cheers from the hundreds of thousands gathered to hear the president.

=== Foundations, corporations, and committees: 1950–1978 ===
The George C. Marshall Foundation, which oversees Clay's correspondences with corporations, foundations, and committees, assembled an alphabetical list that gives a very good overview of Clay's broad range of activities in those fields. Clay served all of the following institutions in some capacity as an associate, as board member, or in a similar position.

- Advisory Committee on Army Organization, 1953–1954
- Affirmation: Vietnam, 1965–1966
- American Express, 1953, 1967–1969, 1977
- American Red Cross, 1952, 1955, 1957–1959, 1962
- American Rose Society, 1972–1973
- American School of Classical Studies at Athens, 1971–1974
- American Society of Civil Engineers, 1975–1979
- Business Advisory Council, 1950–1958
- Business Council, The, 1967–1972
- Central Savings Bank, 1952
- Chase Manhattan Bank, 1965, 1974–1975
- Citizens for Eisenhower-Nixon, 1956, 1962
- Columbia-Presbyterian Medical Center, 1969, 1972–1976
- Committee of Concern, 1973–1975
- Committee of Cuban Families, 1963–1965
- Continental Can Company, 1973–1977
- Cornell University, 1954, 1956–1957
- Corps of Engineers, 1971, 1974–1977
- Council on Social Work Education, 1968–1971
- Crusade for Freedom, 1950, 1953
- Federal National Mortgage Association, 1972–1977
- George C. Marshall Research Foundation, 1972–1974
- George C. Marshall Research Foundation, 1975–1978
- General Aniline and Film Corporation, 1955, 1957
- General Motors Corporation, 1951–1973
- Infantry Museum Association, Inc., 1972–1973
- International Management and Development Institute, 1973–1978
- Lehman Brothers, 1963–1974
- Lehman Brothers, 1975–1978
- Marine Midland Trust Company, 1950–1951, 1953, 1955, 1957
- Metropolitan Life Insurance Company, 1953–1957
- Munitions Board, 1951
- National Committee for a Free Europe, 1953
- National Fire Protection Association, 1953–1954
- New York City Mayor's Committee on Stock Transfer Tax, 1966–1968
- New York State Civil Defense Commission, 1950 July 10
- Pakistan Relief Committee, 1970–1971

== Death and burial ==
Clay died on April 16, 1978, in Chatham, Massachusetts. Clay lies buried in West Point Cemetery, between the graves of Apollo 1 astronaut Ed White and Panama Canal chief engineer George W. Goethals. At Clay's grave site is a stone plate from the citizens of Berlin that says: "Wir danken dem Bewahrer unserer Freiheit" (We thank the Preserver of our Freedom).

== Family ==
Lucius Clay was the father of two sons, both of whom became generals. Clay's son, General Lucius D. Clay Jr., held the positions of commander-in-chief of the North American Air Defense Command, the Continental Air Defense Command, and the United States element of NORAD, and was also a commander of the United States Air Force Aerospace Defense Command. Clay's other son, Major General Frank B. Clay, served in conflicts from World War II through the Vietnam War, and was an adviser to the US delegation at the Paris peace talks which ended US involvement in the Vietnam War.

== Honors ==
Clay was given a ticker-tape parade, among many other honors, upon his return to the United States on 19 May 1949. He appeared on the cover of Time magazine three times. Clay also received an honorary doctorate of the Freie Universität Berlin and became an honorary citizen of Berlin (West) in 1953. One of the longest streets in West Berlin was named Clayallee in his honor, as was the Clay Headquarters Compound, which was located on the street. It held the headquarters of the Berlin Brigade, U.S. Army Berlin (USAB), and the U.S. Mission in Berlin. Marietta, Georgia, named one of its major streets Clay Road, and South Cobb High School's football stadium is named "Clay Stadium" in honor of his work in creating what is now Dobbins Air Force Base there. While now called South Cobb Drive (State Route 280), it still carries memorial signs at each end dedicating the highway to him.

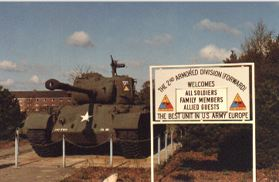
Lucius D. Clay Kaserne

In 1978, a new U.S. Army base in Northern Germany north of the city of Bremen was named for Clay and until the end of the Cold War housed a forward-stationed brigade of the 2nd Armored Division, the 3rd Brigade, 2nd Armored Division, which had been based at Fort Hood, Texas, with the rest of the 2AD. This unit was redesignated as the 2nd Armored Division (Forward). 2AD (FWD) saw action in the Gulf War of 1991 before being inactivated as part of the post-Cold War drawdown of the U.S. Army. Since 1 October 1993, these barracks are used by the Bundeswehr and are still named after Clay. The "General-Clay-March" by Heinz Mertins was written in his honor. Wiesbaden Army Airfield, near Frankfurt, Germany, was renamed "Lucius D. Clay Kaserne" in his honor on 14 June 2012. Wiesbaden Army Airfield was used extensively in "Operation Vittles," aka the Berlin Airlift. The name "Lucius Clay" features in the song "The Legend of Wooley Swamp" by the Charlie Daniels Band. Clay had just died (of emphysema and heart failure) around the time the song was written.

== Awards and decorations ==
Clay's decorations include: the Army Distinguished Service Medal with two Oak Leaf Clusters, Legion of Merit, Bronze Star Medal, World War I Victory Medal, Army of Occupation of Germany Medal, American Defense Service Medal, American Campaign Medal, European-African-Middle Eastern Campaign Medal, World War II Victory Medal, Army of Occupation Medal, Order of Kutuzov First Class, Order of the British Empire, Military Order of the White Lion, Officer of the Military William Order, Commander of the Legion of Honour and Bundesverdienstkreuz (Grand Cross).

In addition to military awards, he was also awarded the international human rights award Dr.-Rainer-Hildebrandt-Medaille.

== Dates of rank ==
Insignia	Rank	Component	Date
No insignia	Cadet	United States Military Academy	15 June 1915
	Second lieutenant	Regular Army	12 June 1918
	First lieutenant	Regular Army	12 June 1918
	Captain	Temporary	15 June 1918
	Captain	Regular Army	27 February 1920
	First lieutenant	Regular Army	18 November 1922
	Captain	Regular Army	19 June 1933
	Major	Regular Army	1 March 1940
	Lieutenant colonel	Army of the United States	12 June 1941
	Colonel	Army of the United States	23 September 1941
	Brigadier general	Army of the United States	12 March 1942
	Lieutenant colonel	Regular Army	4 July 1942
	Major general	Army of the United States	3 December 1942
	Lieutenant general	Army of the United States	17 April 1945
	Brigadier general	Regular Army	5 March 1946
	General	Army of the United States	17 March 1947
	Major general	Regular Army	24 January 1948
	General	Regular Army, Retired	31 May 1949

== References and further reading ==
External videos
- Booknotes interview with Jean Edward Smith on Lucius D. Clay: An American Life, November 18, 1990, C-SPAN

- Cherny, Andrei. "The Candy Bombers: The Untold Story of the Berlin Airlift and America's Finest Hour" 2009 (New York: Berkley Caliber)
- Daum, Andreas. Kennedy in Berlin. New York: Cambridge University Press, 2008, ISBN 978-0-521-85824-3.
- George, Matthew A. "The Operational Art of Political Transformation: General Lucius D. Clay, Post World War II Germany, and Beyond" (Army Command And General Staff College Fort Leavenworth KS, 2018). online
- Hackett, David A. The Buchenwald Report. 1997 Westview Press ISBN 0-8133-3363-6
- Judge, Clark S. "Clay, Lucius." In Tracy S. Uebelhor, ed. The Truman Years, Presidential Profiles (New York: Facts On File, Inc., 2006)
- Lamberti, Marjorie. "General Lucius Clay, German Politicians, and the Great Crisis during the Making of West Germany's Constitution." German Politics and Society 27.4 (2009): 24–50.
- Morgan Jr., Curtis F. James F. Byrnes, Lucius Clay and American Policy in Germany, 1945–1947. (Edwin Mellen Press, 2002).
- Smith, Jean Edward. Lucius D. Clay: An American Life New York: Henry, Holt & Company, 1990.
- Saunders, Francis Stonor, Who Paid the Piper?: CIA and the Cultural Cold War, 1999, Granta, ISBN 1-86207-029-6 (US: The Cultural Cold War: The CIA and the World of Arts and Letters, 2000, The New Press, ISBN 1-56584-596-X).
- Trauschweizer, Ingo Wolfgang. "Tanks at Checkpoint Charlie: Lucius Clay and the Berlin Crisis, 1961–62." Cold War History 6.2 (2006): 205–228.

=== Primary sources ===
- Jean Edward Smith. The Papers Of General Lucius D. Clay Bloomington, IN: Indiana University Press, 1974.

Military offices
Preceded by Joseph T. McNarney	Commanding General of the European Command; 1947–1949	Succeeded by Clarence R. Huebner
