= List of United States Senate elections =

The List of United States Senate elections has been split into the following two parts for convenience:

- List of United States Senate elections (1788–1913)
- List of United States Senate elections (1914–present)

The following are lists of United States Senate elections by other criteria:

- List of United States Senate election results by region
- List of United States Senate election results by state
  - Alabama
  - Alaska
  - California
  - Colorado
  - Delaware
  - District of Columbia
  - Indiana
  - Ohio
  - Pennsylvania
  - Wyoming
- List of United States Senate election disputes
- List of special elections to the United States Senate

== See also ==
- List of elections in the United States
