= List of elections in the United States =

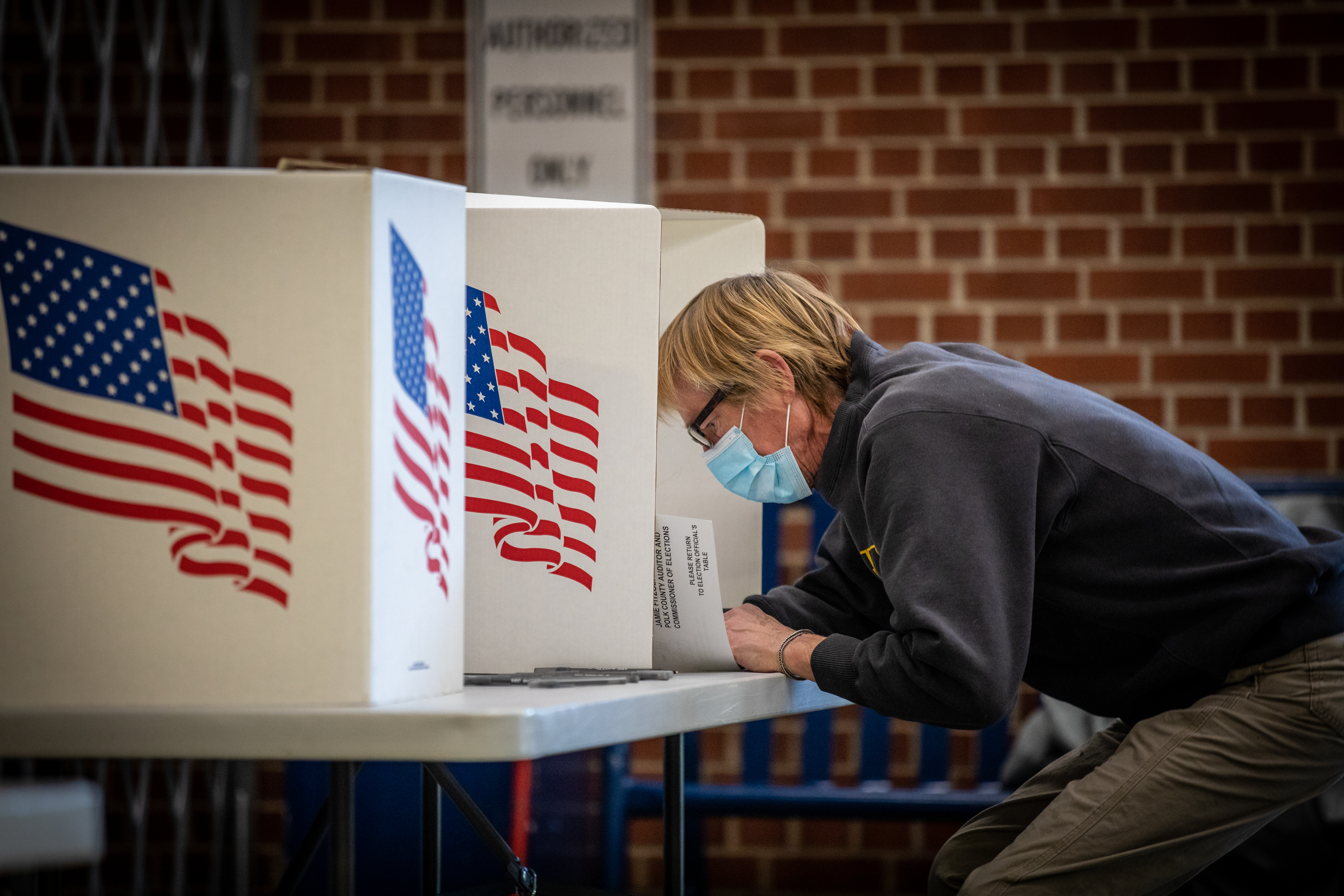
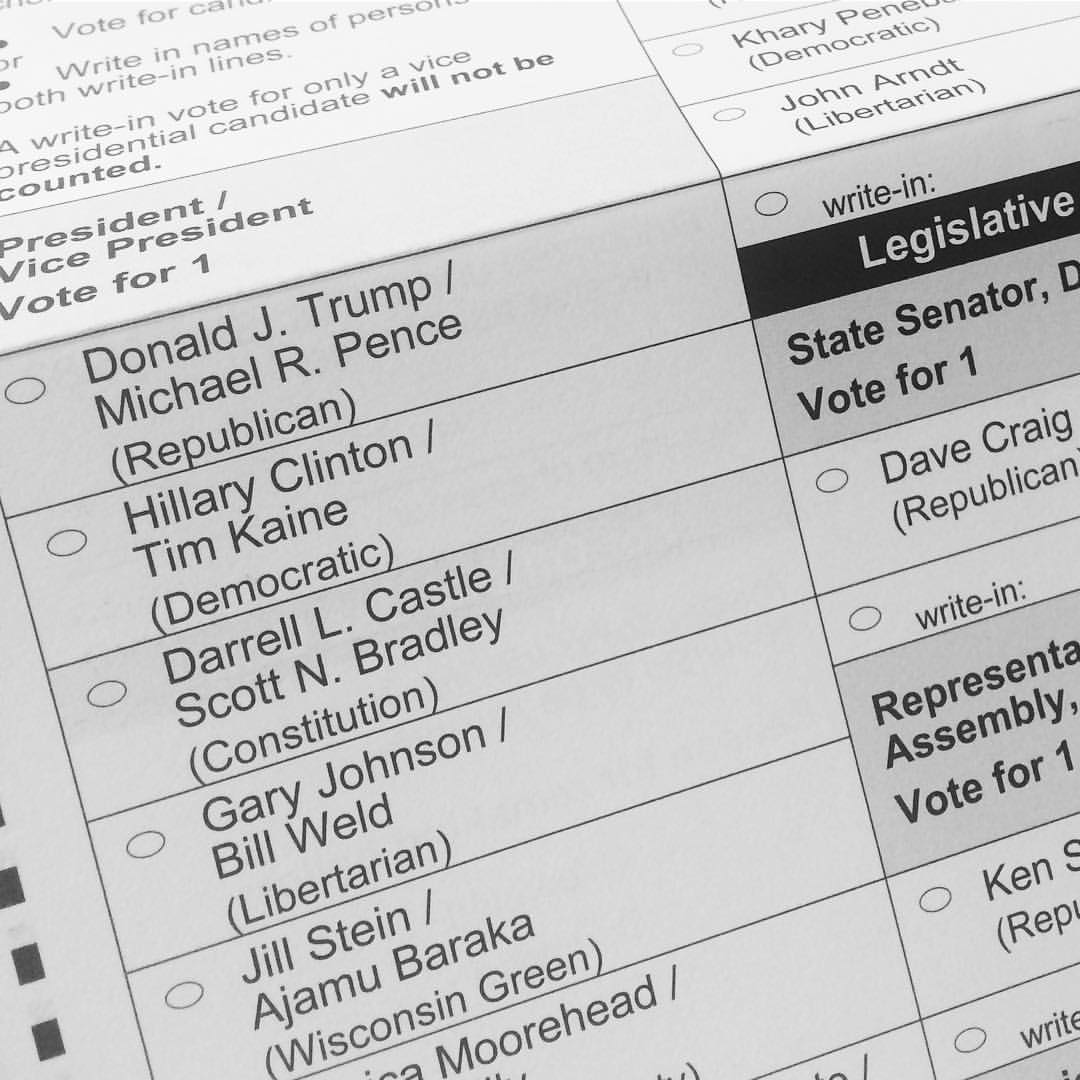
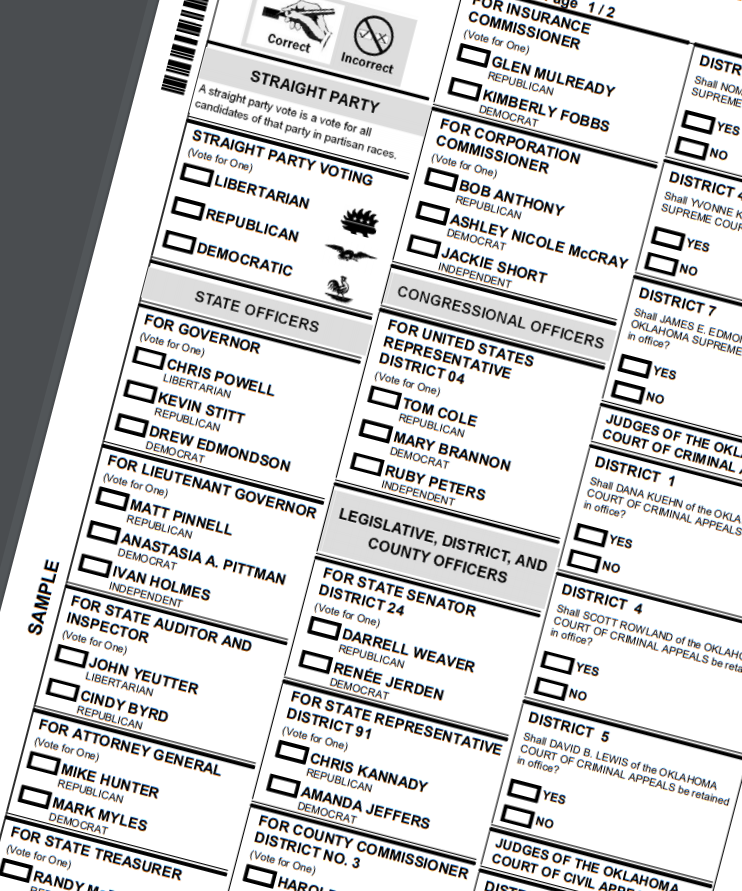
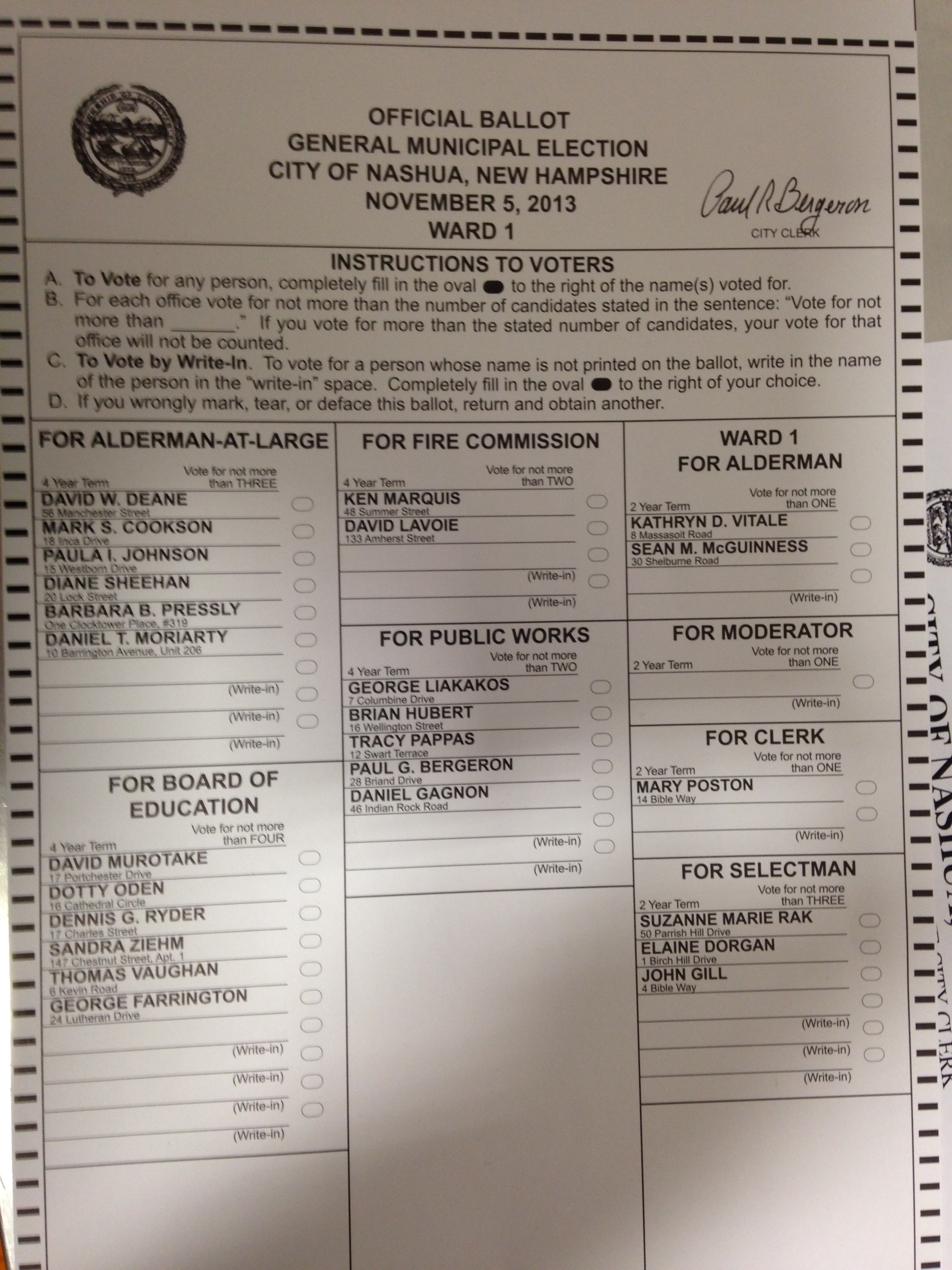
From left to right, top to bottom: a voter casting a 2020 ballot at Roosevelt High School in Des Moines, Iowa; a 2016 general election ballot listing the presidential and vice presidential candidates; a 2018 Oklahoma midterm election ballot listing candidates for congressional, state, and local offices; and a 2013 off-year election ballot listing local races in Nashua, New Hampshire

The United States holds its federal elections on the first Tuesday in November. The President of the United States is elected to a four-year term. Each of the 435 seats in the United States House of Representatives are elected to two-year terms. The 100 members in the United States Senate are elected to six-year terms, with one-third of them being renewed every two years.

Because of when these federal offices are up for election, the election years are commonly classified into the following three categories:

- Presidential elections: Elections for the U.S. President are held every four years, coinciding with those for all 435 seats in the House of Representatives, and 33 or 34 of the 100 seats in the Senate.
- Midterm elections: They occur two years after each presidential election. Elections are held for all 435 seats in the House of Representatives, and 33 or 34 seats in the Senate. As a result, the membership of these two legislative chambers changes near the midpoint of a president's four-year term of office.
- Off-year elections: These are elections during odd-numbered years. Only special elections, if necessary, are held to fill vacant seats in the Senate and House of Representatives, usually either due to incumbents resigning or dying while in office.

The years in which elections are held for U.S. state and local offices vary between each jurisdiction. The vast majority of races held during off-year elections are at the city and local level, but many other city and local governments may instead hold their elections during even-numbered years to coincide with either the presidential or midterm elections.

== List of elections by year ==
=== 1788–1879 ===
Each state originally set their own separate date for their congressional elections. Before the Twentieth Amendment to the United States Constitution was ratified in 1933, the date on which a Congress usually began was March 4 of the odd-numbered year instead of early January. Individual states could schedule congressional elections into January or February. The dates when Senate elections were held varied even more: before the Seventeenth Amendment was ratified in 1913, senators were chosen by state legislatures, which meant senate seats could remain vacant for months or years due to legislative deadlock.

Year	General	Senate	House	President	Governors	Mayors
1788/89	General 1788/89	Senate 1788/89	House 1788/89	President 1788/89	Governors 1788	
1790	General 1790	Senate 1790/91	House 1790/91	President 1788/89	Governors 1790	
1792	General 1792	Senate 1792/93	House 1792/93	President 1792	Governors 1792	
1794	General 1794	Senate 1794/95	House 1794/95	President 1792	Governors 1794	
1796	General 1796	Senate 1796/97	House 1796/97	President 1796	Governors 1796	
1798	General 1798	Senate 1798/99	House 1798/99	President 1796	Governors 1798	
1800	General 1800	Senate 1800/01	House 1800/01	President 1800	Governors 1800	
1802	General 1802	Senate 1802/03	House 1802/03	President 1800	Governors 1802	
1804	General 1804	Senate 1804/05	House 1804/05	President 1804	Governors 1804	
1806	General 1806	Senate 1806/07	House 1806/07	President 1804	Governors 1806	
1808	General 1808	Senate 1808/09	House 1808/09	President 1808	Governors 1808	
1810	General 1810	Senate 1810/11	House 1810/11	President 1808	Governors 1810	
1812	General 1812	Senate 1812/13	House 1812/13	President 1812	Governors 1812	
1814	General 1814	Senate 1814/15	House 1814/15	President 1812	Governors 1814	
1816	General 1816	Senate 1816/17	House 1816/17	President 1816	Governors 1816	
1818	General 1818	Senate 1818/19	House 1818/19	President 1816	Governors 1818	
1820	General 1820	Senate 1820/21	House 1820/21	President 1820	Governors 1820	
1822	General 1822	Senate 1822/23	House 1822/23	President 1820	Governors 1822	
1824	General 1824	Senate 1824/25	House 1824/25	President 1824	Governors 1824	
1826	General 1826	Senate 1826/27	House 1826/27	President 1824	Governors 1826	
1828	General 1828	Senate 1828/29	House 1828/29	President 1828	Governors 1828	
1830	General 1830	Senate 1830/31	House 1830/31	President 1828	Governors 1830	
1832	General 1832	Senate 1832/33	House 1832/33	President 1832	Governors 1832	
1834	General 1834	Senate 1834/35	House 1834/35	President 1832	Governors 1834	
1836	General 1836	Senate 1836/37	House 1836/37	President 1836	Governors 1836	
1838	General 1838	Senate 1838/39	House 1838/39	President 1836	Governors 1838	Mayors 1838
1840	General 1840	Senate 1840/41	House 1840/41	President 1840	Governors 1840	Mayors 1840
1842	General 1842	Senate 1842/43	House 1842/43	President 1840	Governors 1842	Mayors 1842
1844	General 1844	Senate 1844/45	House 1844/45	President 1844	Governors 1844	Mayors 1844
1846	General 1846	Senate 1846/47	House 1846/47	President 1844	Governors 1846	Mayors 1846
1848	General 1848	Senate 1848/49	House 1848/49	President 1848	Governors 1848	Mayors 1848
1850	General 1850	Senate 1850/51	House 1850/51	President 1848	Governors 1850	Mayors 1850
1852	General 1852	Senate 1852/53	House 1852/53	President 1852	Governors 1852	Mayors 1852
1854	General 1854	Senate 1854/55	House 1854/55	President 1852	Governors 1854	Mayors 1854
1856	General 1856	Senate 1856/57	House 1856/57	President 1856	Governors 1856	Mayors 1856
1858	General 1858	Senate 1858/59	House 1858/59	President 1856	Governors 1858	Mayors 1858
1860	General 1860	Senate 1860/61	House 1860/61	President 1860	Governors 1860	Mayors 1860
1862	General 1862	Senate 1862/63	House 1862/63	President 1860	Governors 1862	Mayors 1862
1864	General 1864	Senate 1864/65	House 1864/65	President 1864	Governors 1864	Mayors 1864
1866	General 1866	Senate 1866/67	House 1866/67	President 1864	Governors 1866	Mayors 1866
1868	General 1868	Senate 1868/69	House 1868/69	President 1868	Governors 1868	Mayors 1868
1870	General 1870	Senate 1870/71	House 1870/71	President 1868	Governors 1870	Mayors 1870
1872	General 1872	Senate 1872/73	House 1872/73	President 1872	Governors 1872	Mayors 1872
1874	General 1874	Senate 1874/75	House 1874/75	President 1872	Governors 1874	Mayors 1874
1876	General 1876	Senate 1876/77	House 1876/77	President 1876	Governors 1876	Mayors 1876
1878	General 1878	Senate 1878/79	House 1878/79	President 1876	Governors 1878	Mayors 1878

=== 1880–1911 ===
Congress began to standardize House elections in 1872, and by 1880 every state had moved their regular House elections to even-numbered years. However, a state's Senate election continued to depend on whether its state legislature remained in gridlock.

Year	General	Senate	House	President	Governors	Mayors
1880	General 1880	Senate 1880/81	House 1880	President 1880	Governors 1880	Mayors 1880
1881	General 1881	Senate 1880/81	House 1881	President 1880	Governors 1881	Mayors 1881
1882	General 1882	Senate 1882/83	House 1882	President 1880	Governors 1882	Mayors 1882
1883	General 1883	Senate 1882/83	House 1883	President 1880	Governors 1883	Mayors 1883
1884	General 1884	Senate 1884/85	House 1884	President 1884	Governors 1884	Mayors 1884
1885	General 1885	Senate 1884/85	House 1885	President 1884	Governors 1885	Mayors 1885
1886	General 1886	Senate 1886/87	House 1886	President 1884	Governors 1886	Mayors 1886
1887	General 1887	Senate 1886/87	House 1887	President 1884	Governors 1887	Mayors 1887
1888	General 1888	Senate 1888/89	House 1888	President 1888	Governors 1888	Mayors 1888
1889	General 1889	Senate 1888/89	House 1889	President 1888	Governors 1889	Mayors 1889
1890	General 1890	Senate 1890/91	House 1890	President 1888	Governors 1890	Mayors 1890
1891	General 1891	Senate 1890/91	House 1891	President 1888	Governors 1891	Mayors 1891
1892	General 1892	Senate 1892/93	House 1892	President 1892	Governors 1892	Mayors 1892
1893	General 1893	Senate 1892/93	House 1893	President 1892	Governors 1893	Mayors 1893
1894	General 1894	Senate 1894/95	House 1894	President 1892	Governors 1894	Mayors 1894
1895	General 1895	Senate 1894/95	House 1895	President 1892	Governors 1895	Mayors 1895
1896	General 1896	Senate 1896/97	House 1896	President 1896	Governors 1896	Mayors 1896
1897	General 1897	Senate 1896/97	House 1897	President 1896	Governors 1897	Mayors 1897
1898	General 1898	Senate 1898/99	House 1898	President 1896	Governors 1898	Mayors 1898
1899	General 1899	Senate 1898/99	House 1899	President 1896	Governors 1899	Mayors 1899
1900	General 1900	Senate 1900/01	House 1900	President 1900	Governors 1900	Mayors 1900
1901	General 1901	Senate 1900/01	House 1901	President 1900	Governors 1901	Mayors 1901
1902	General 1902	Senate 1902/03	House 1902	President 1900	Governors 1902	Mayors 1902
1903	General 1903	Senate 1902/03	House 1903	President 1900	Governors 1903	Mayors 1903
1904	General 1904	Senate 1904/05	House 1904	President 1904	Governors 1904	Mayors 1904
1905	General 1905	Senate 1904/05	House 1905	President 1904	Governors 1905	Mayors 1905
1906	General 1906	Senate 1906/07	House 1906	President 1904	Governors 1906	Mayors 1906
1907	General 1907	Senate 1906/07	House 1907	President 1904	Governors 1907	Mayors 1907
1908	General 1908	Senate 1908/09	House 1908	President 1908	Governors 1908	Mayors 1908
1909	General 1909	Senate 1908/09	House 1909	President 1908	Governors 1909	Mayors 1909
1910	General 1910	Senate 1910/11	House 1910	President 1908	Governors 1910	Mayors 1910
1911	General 1911	Senate 1910/11	House 1911	President 1908	Governors 1911	Mayors 1911

=== 1912–present ===
The 1914 midterm elections became the first year that all regular Senate elections were held in even-numbered years, coinciding with the House elections. The ratification of the Seventeenth Amendment to the United States Constitution in 1913 established the direct election of senators, instead of having them elected directly by state legislatures.

Year	General	Senate	House	President	Governors	Mayors
1912	General 1912	Senate 1912/13	House 1912	President 1912	Governors 1912	Mayors 1912
1913	General 1913	Senate 1913	House 1913	President 1912	Governors 1913	Mayors 1913
1914	General 1914	Senate 1914	House 1914	President 1912	Governors 1914	Mayors 1914
1915	General 1915	~~Senate 1915~~ (None)	House 1915	President 1912	Governors 1915	Mayors 1915
1916	General 1916	Senate 1916	House 1916	President 1916	Governors 1916	Mayors 1916
1917	General 1917	~~Senate 1917~~ (None)	House 1917	President 1916	Governors 1917	Mayors 1917
1918	General 1918	Senate 1918	House 1918	President 1916	Governors 1918	Mayors 1918
1919	General 1919	~~Senate 1919~~ (None)	House 1919	President 1916	Governors 1919	Mayors 1919
1920	General 1920	Senate 1920	House 1920	President 1920	Governors 1920	Mayors 1920
1921	General 1921	Senate 1921	House 1921	President 1920	Governors 1921	Mayors 1921
1922	General 1922	Senate 1922	House 1922	President 1920	Governors 1922	Mayors 1922
1923	General 1923	Senate 1923	House 1923	President 1920	Governors 1923	Mayors 1923
1924	General 1924	Senate 1924	House 1924	President 1924	Governors 1924	Mayors 1924
1925	General 1925	Senate 1925	House 1925	President 1924	Governors 1925	Mayors 1925
1926	General 1926	Senate 1926	House 1926	President 1924	Governors 1926	Mayors 1926
1927	General 1927	~~Senate 1927~~ (None)	House 1927	President 1924	Governors 1927	Mayors 1927
1928	General 1928	Senate 1928	House 1928	President 1928	Governors 1928	Mayors 1928
1929	General 1929	~~Senate 1929~~ (None)	House 1929	President 1928	Governors 1929	Mayors 1929
1930	General 1930	Senate 1930	House 1930	President 1928	Governors 1930	Mayors 1930
1931	General 1931	Senate 1931	House 1931	President 1928	Governors 1931	Mayors 1931
1932	General 1932	Senate 1932	House 1932	President 1932	Governors 1932	Mayors 1932
1933	General 1933	Senate 1933	House 1933	President 1932	Governors 1933	Mayors 1933
1934	General 1934	Senate 1934	House 1934	President 1932	Governors 1934	Mayors 1934
1935	General 1935	~~Senate 1935~~ (None)	House 1935	President 1932	Governors 1935	Mayors 1935
1936	General 1936	Senate 1936	House 1936	President 1936	Governors 1936	Mayors 1936
1937	General 1937	Senate 1937	House 1937	President 1936	Governors 1937	Mayors 1937
1938	General 1938	Senate 1938	House 1938	President 1936	Governors 1938	Mayors 1938
1939	General 1939	~~Senate 1939~~ (None)	House 1939	President 1936	Governors 1939	Mayors 1939
1940	General 1940	Senate 1940	House 1940	President 1940	Governors 1940	Mayors 1940
1941	General 1941	Senate 1941	House 1941	President 1940	Governors 1941	Mayors 1941
1942	General 1942	Senate 1942	House 1942	President 1940	Governors 1942	Mayors 1942
1943	General 1943	~~Senate 1943~~ (None)	House 1943	President 1940	Governors 1943	Mayors 1943
1944	General 1944	Senate 1944	House 1944	President 1944	Governors 1944	Mayors 1944
1945	General 1945	~~Senate 1945~~ (None)	House 1945	President 1944	Governors 1945	Mayors 1945
1946	General 1946	Senate 1946	House 1946	President 1944	Governors 1946	Mayors 1946
1947	General 1947	Senate 1947	House 1947	President 1944	Governors 1947	Mayors 1947
1948	General 1948	Senate 1948	House 1948	President 1948	Governors 1948	Mayors 1948
1949	General 1949	Senate 1949	House 1949	President 1948	Governors 1949	Mayors 1949
1950	General 1950	Senate 1950	House 1950	President 1948	Governors 1950	Mayors 1950
1951	General 1951	~~Senate 1951~~ (None)	House 1951	President 1948	Governors 1951	Mayors 1951
1952	General 1952	Senate 1952	House 1952	President 1952	Governors 1952	Mayors 1952
1953	General 1953	~~Senate 1953~~ (None)	House 1953	President 1952	Governors 1953	Mayors 1953
1954	General 1954	Senate 1954	House 1954	President 1952	Governors 1954	Mayors 1954
1955	General 1955	~~Senate 1955~~ (None)	House 1955	President 1952	Governors 1955	Mayors 1955
1956	General 1956	Senate 1956	House 1956	President 1956	Governors 1956	Mayors 1956
1957	General 1957	Senate 1957	House 1957	President 1956	Governors 1957	Mayors 1957
1958	General 1958	Senate 1958	House 1958	President 1956	Governors 1958	Mayors 1958
1959	General 1959	Senate 1959	House 1959	President 1956	Governors 1959	Mayors 1959
1960	General 1960	Senate 1960	House 1960	President 1960	Governors 1960	Mayors 1960
1961	General 1961	Senate 1961	House 1961	President 1960	Governors 1961	Mayors 1961
1962	General 1962	Senate 1962	House 1962	President 1960	Governors 1962	Mayors 1962
1963	General 1963	~~Senate 1963~~ (None)	House 1963	President 1960	Governors 1963	Mayors 1963
1964	General 1964	Senate 1964	House 1964	President 1964	Governors 1964	Mayors 1964
1965	General 1965	~~Senate 1965~~ (None)	House 1965	President 1964	Governors 1965	Mayors 1965
1966	General 1966	Senate 1966	House 1966	President 1964	Governors 1966	Mayors 1966
1967	General 1967	~~Senate 1967~~ (None)	House 1967	President 1964	Governors 1967	Mayors 1967
1968	General 1968	Senate 1968	House 1968	President 1968	Governors 1968	Mayors 1968
1969	General 1969	~~Senate 1969~~ (None)	House 1969	President 1968	Governors 1969	Mayors 1969
1970	General 1970	Senate 1970	House 1970	President 1968	Governors 1970	Mayors 1970
1971	General 1971	~~Senate 1971~~ (None)	House 1971	President 1968	Governors 1971	Mayors 1971
1972	General 1972	Senate 1972	House 1972	President 1972	Governors 1972	Mayors 1972
1973	General 1973	~~Senate 1973~~ (None)	House 1973	President 1972	Governors 1973	Mayors 1973
1974	General 1974	Senate 1974	House 1974	President 1972	Governors 1974	Mayors 1974
1975	General 1975	Senate 1975	House 1975	President 1972	Governors 1975	Mayors 1975
1976	General 1976	Senate 1976	House 1976	President 1976	Governors 1976	Mayors 1976
1977	General 1977	~~Senate 1977~~ (None)	House 1977	President 1976	Governors 1977	Mayors 1977
1978	General 1978	Senate 1978	House 1978	President 1976	Governors 1978	Mayors 1978
1979	General 1979	~~Senate 1979~~ (None)	House 1979	President 1976	Governors 1979	Mayors 1979
1980	General 1980	Senate 1980	House 1980	President 1980	Governors 1980	Mayors 1980
1981	General 1981	~~Senate 1981~~ (None)	House 1981	President 1980	Governors 1981	Mayors 1981
1982	General 1982	Senate 1982	House 1982	President 1980	Governors 1982	Mayors 1982
1983	General 1983	Senate 1983	House 1983	President 1980	Governors 1983	Mayors 1983
1984	General 1984	Senate 1984	House 1984	President 1984	Governors 1984	Mayors 1984
1985	General 1985	~~Senate 1985~~ (None)	House 1985	President 1984	Governors 1985	Mayors 1985
1986	General 1986	Senate 1986	House 1986	President 1984	Governors 1986	Mayors 1986
1987	General 1987	~~Senate 1987~~ (None)	House 1987	President 1984	Governors 1987	Mayors 1987
1988	General 1988	Senate 1988	House 1988	President 1988	Governors 1988	Mayors 1988
1989	General 1989	~~Senate 1989~~ (None)	House 1989	President 1988	Governors 1989	Mayors 1989
1990	General 1990	Senate 1990	House 1990	President 1988	Governors 1990	Mayors 1990
1991	General 1991	Senate 1991	House 1991	President 1988	Governors 1991	Mayors 1991
1992	General 1992	Senate 1992	House 1992	President 1992	Governors 1992	Mayors 1992
1993	General 1993	Senate 1993	House 1993	President 1992	Governors 1993	Mayors 1993
1994	General 1994	Senate 1994	House 1994	President 1992	Governors 1994	Mayors 1994
1995	General 1995	~~Senate 1995~~ (None)	House 1995	President 1992	Governors 1995	Mayors 1995
1996	General 1996	Senate 1996	House 1996	President 1996	Governors 1996	Mayors 1996
1997	General 1997	~~Senate 1997~~ (None)	House 1997	President 1996	Governors 1997	Mayors 1997
1998	General 1998	Senate 1998	House 1998	President 1996	Governors 1998	Mayors 1998
1999	General 1999	~~Senate 1999~~ (None)	House 1999	President 1996	Governors 1999	Mayors 1999
2000	General 2000	Senate 2000	House 2000	President 2000	Governors 2000	Mayors 2000
2001	General 2001	~~Senate 2001~~ (None)	House 2001	President 2000	Governors 2001	Mayors 2001
2002	General 2002	Senate 2002	House 2002	President 2000	Governors 2002	Mayors 2002
2003	General 2003	~~Senate 2003~~ (None)	House 2003	President 2000	Governors 2003	Mayors 2003
2004	General 2004	Senate 2004	House 2004	President 2004	Governors 2004	Mayors 2004
2005	General 2005	~~Senate 2005~~ (None)	House 2005	President 2004	Governors 2005	Mayors 2005
2006	General 2006	Senate 2006	House 2006	President 2004	Governors 2006	Mayors 2006
2007	General 2007	~~Senate 2007~~ (None)	House 2007	President 2004	Governors 2007	Mayors 2007
2008	General 2008	Senate 2008	House 2008	President 2008	Governors 2008	Mayors 2008
2009	General 2009	Senate 2009	House 2009	President 2008	Governors 2009	Mayors 2009
2010	General 2010	Senate 2010	House 2010	President 2008	Governors 2010	Mayors 2010
2011	General 2011	~~Senate 2011~~ (None)	House 2011	President 2008	Governors 2011	Mayors 2011
2012	General 2012	Senate 2012	House 2012	President 2012	Governors 2012	Mayors 2012
2013	General 2013	Senate 2013	House 2013	President 2012	Governors 2013	Mayors 2013
2014	General 2014	Senate 2014	House 2014	President 2012	Governors 2014	Mayors 2014
2015	General 2015	~~Senate 2015~~ (None)	House 2015	President 2012	Governors 2015	Mayors 2015
2016	General 2016	Senate 2016	House 2016	President 2016	Governors 2016	Mayors 2016
2017	General 2017	Senate 2017	House 2017	President 2016	Governors 2017	Mayors 2017
2018	General 2018	Senate 2018	House 2018	President 2016	Governors 2018	Mayors 2018
2019	General 2019	~~Senate 2019~~ (None)	House 2019	President 2016	Governors 2019	Mayors 2019
2020	General 2020	Senate 2020	House 2020	President 2020	Governors 2020	Mayors 2020
2021	General 2021	~~Senate 2021~~ (None)	House 2021	President 2020	Governors 2021	Mayors 2021
2022	General 2022	Senate 2022	House 2022	President 2020	Governors 2022	Mayors 2022
2023	General 2023	~~Senate 2023~~ (None)	House 2023	President 2020	Governors 2023	Mayors 2023
2024	General 2024	Senate 2024	House 2024	President 2024	Governors 2024	Mayors 2024
2025	General 2025	Senate 2025	House 2025	President 2024	Governors 2025	Mayors 2025
2026	General 2026	Senate 2026	House 2026	President 2024	Governors 2026	Mayors 2026
2027	General 2027	Senate 2027	House 2027	President 2024	Governors 2027	Mayors 2027
2028	General 2028	Senate 2028	House 2028	President 2028	Governors 2028	Mayors 2028

State legislature elections	2010	2012	2014	2016	2018	2020	2022

== Other ==
Special	Senate special	House special
Disputes	Senate disputes	
