= List of United States House of Representatives elections =

The List of United States House of Representatives elections has been split into the following parts for convenience:

- List of United States House of Representatives elections (1789–1822)
- List of United States House of Representatives elections (1824–1854)
- List of United States House of Representatives elections (1856–present)
- List of Speaker of the United States House of Representatives elections

== See also ==
- List of elections in the United States
- Congressional stagnation in the United States
