= List of United States Senate elections (1788–1913) =

Key:

AJ_{#}	Anti-Jacksonian
A_{#}	Anti–Administration
C_{#}	Conservative
D_{#}	Democratic
DR_{#}	Democratic–Republican
F_{#}	Federalist
FL_{#}	Farmer–Labor
FS_{#}	Free Soil
I_{#}	Independent
ID_{#}	Independent Democratic
J_{#}	Jacksonian
KN_{#}	Know Nothing
N_{#}	Nullifier
P_{#}	Pro-Administration
Pg_{#}	Progressive
RA_{#}	Readjuster
R_{#}	Republican
U_{#}	Union
UU_{#}	Unconditional Union
V_{#}	Vacant

== 1788 and 1789 elections ==
These were the first Senate elections, which coincided with the election of President George Washington. As of this election, formal organized political parties had yet to form in the United States, but two political factions were present: The coalition of senators who supported George Washington's administration were known as "Pro-Administration," and the senators against him as "Anti-Administration." Members are informally grouped into factions of similar interest, based on an analysis of their voting record.

V_{1}
A_{1}	A_{2}	A_{3}	A_{4}	A_{5}	A_{6}	A_{7}	P_{13}	P_{12}	P_{11}
Majority →									P_{11}
P_{1}	P_{2}	P_{3}	P_{4}	P_{5}	P_{6}	P_{7}	P_{8}	P_{9}	P_{10}
V_{2}

== 1790 and 1791 elections ==
These were the second series of elections. In these elections, terms were up for the nine Senators in Class 1. As of these elections, formal organized political parties had yet to form in the United States, but two political factions were present: The coalition of Senators who supported President George Washington's administration were known as the Pro-Administration Party, and the Senators against him as the Anti-Administration Party.

Note: There were no political parties in this Congress. Members are informally grouped into factions of similar interest, based on an analysis of their voting record.

A_{3}	A_{2}	A_{1}							
A_{4}	A_{5}	A_{6} Re-elected	A_{7} Gain	V_{1} A Loss	P_{18} Hold	P_{17} Hold	P_{16} Re-elected	P_{15} Re-elected	P_{14} Re-elected
Majority →									P_{14} Re-elected
P_{4}	P_{5}	P_{6}	P_{7}	P_{8}	P_{9}	P_{10}	P_{11}	P_{12}	P_{13} Re-elected
P_{3}	P_{2}	P_{1}							

== 1792 and 1793 elections ==
These elections coincided with President George Washington's unanimous re-election. In these elections, terms were up for the ten senators in class 2.

Note: There were no political parties in this Congress. Members are informally grouped into factions of similar interest, based on an analysis of their voting record.

A_{5}	A_{4}	A_{3}	A_{2}	A_{1}					
A_{6}	A_{7} Re-elected	A_{8} Re-elected	A_{9} Re-elected	A_{10} Hold	A_{11} Gain	V_{1}	P_{18} Gain	P_{17} Gain	P_{16} Hold
Majority →									P_{16} Hold
P_{6}	P_{7}	P_{8}	P_{9}	P_{10}	P_{11}	P_{12}	P_{13}	P_{14} Re-elected	P_{15} Hold
P_{5}	P_{4}	P_{3}	P_{2}	P_{1}					

== 1794 and 1795 elections ==
These elections had the formation of organized political parties in the United States, with the Federalist Party emerging from the Pro Administration coalition, and the Democratic-Republican Party emerging from the Anti-Administration coalition.

A_{5}	A_{4}	A_{3}	A_{2}	A_{1}					
A_{6}	A_{7}	A_{8}	DR_{1} Gain	DR_{2} Gain	V_{1}	F_{8} Gain	F_{7} Gain	F_{6} Gain	F_{5} Gain
									F_{4} Gain
P_{6}	P_{7}	P_{8}	P_{9}	P_{10}	P_{11}	F_{1} Gain	F_{2} Gain	F_{3} Gain	F_{4} Gain
P_{5}	P_{4}	P_{3}	P_{2}	P_{1}					

== 1796 and 1797 elections ==
These elections coincided with John Adams's election as President. His ruling Federalist Party gained one seat.

DR_{6}	DR_{5}	DR_{4}	DR_{3}	DR_{2}	DR_{1}				
DR_{7} Re-elected	DR_{8} Hold	DR_{9} Hold	DR_{10} Gain	V_{1} Gain	F_{21} Gain	F_{20} Hold	F_{19} Hold	F_{18} Hold	F_{17} Hold
Majority →									F_{17} Hold
F_{7} Re-elected	F_{8} Re-elected	F_{9} Re-elected	F_{10} Re-elected	F_{11} Re-elected	F_{12} Hold	F_{13} Hold	F_{14} Hold	F_{15} Hold	F_{16} Hold
F_{6}	F_{5}	F_{4}	F_{3}	F_{2}	F_{1}				

== 1798 and 1799 elections ==
These elections were held at the middle of President John Adams's administration and had no net change in political control of the Senate.

DR_{6} Re-elected	DR_{5} Re-elected	DR_{4}	DR_{3}	DR_{2}	DR_{1}				
DR_{7} Hold	DR_{8} Hold	DR_{9} Hold	V_{1} DR loss	F_{22} Hold	F_{21} Hold	F_{20} Re-elected	F_{19} Re-elected	F_{18} Re-elected	F_{17}
Majority →									F_{17}
F_{7}	F_{8}	F_{9}	F_{10}	F_{11}	F_{12}	F_{13}	F_{14}	F_{15}	F_{16}
F_{6}	F_{5}	F_{4}	F_{3}	F_{2}	F_{1}				

== 1800 and 1801 elections ==
Coinciding with their takeover of the White House, the Democratic-Republicans took control of the Senate. Although the Federalists began the next (7th) Congress with a slim majority, they lost their majority shortly thereafter due to mid-year special elections.

DR_{6}	DR_{5}	DR_{4}	DR_{3}	DR_{2}	DR_{1}				
DR_{7}	DR_{8}	DR_{9} Re-elected	DR_{10} Hold	DR_{11} Gain	DR_{12} Gain	DR_{13} Gain	DR_{14} Gain	V_{1} F loss	F_{17} Gain
Majority →									F_{17} Gain
Majority →									F_{16} Re-elected
F_{7}	F_{8}	F_{9}	F_{10}	F_{11}	F_{12}	F_{13}	F_{14}	F_{15} Re-elected	F_{16} Re-elected
F_{6}	F_{5}	F_{4}	F_{3}	F_{2}	F_{1}				

== 1802 and 1803 elections ==
These elections had the Democratic-Republicans assume an overwhelming control of the Senate.

DR_{6}	DR_{5}	DR_{4}	DR_{3}	DR_{2}	DR_{1}				
DR_{7}	DR_{8}	DR_{9}	DR_{10}	DR_{11}	DR_{12}	DR_{13}	DR_{14}	DR_{15}	DR_{16} Re-elected
Majority →									DR_{17} Re-elected
F_{7} Re-elected	F_{8} Re-elected	F_{9} Hold	V_{1} Fed loss	DR_{22} Gain	DR_{21} Gain	DR_{20} Gain	DR_{19} Gain	DR_{18} Gain	DR_{17} Re-elected
F_{6}	F_{5}	F_{4}	F_{3}	F_{2}	F_{1}				

== 1804 and 1805 elections ==
These elections expanded the Democratic-Republicans' overwhelming control of the Senate. The Federalists went into the elections with such a small share of seats (9 out of 34, or 26%) that even had they won every election, they would have still remained a minority caucus.

DR_{7}	DR_{6}	DR_{5}	DR_{4}	DR_{3}	DR_{2}	DR_{1}			
DR_{8}	DR_{9}	DR_{10}	DR_{11}	DR_{12}	DR_{13}	DR_{14}	DR_{15}	DR_{16}	DR_{17}
Majority →									DR_{18}
DR_{27} Gain	DR_{26} Gain	DR_{25} Hold	DR_{24} Hold	DR_{23} Hold	DR_{22} Hold	DR_{21} Re-elected	DR_{20} Re-elected	DR_{19} Re-elected	DR_{18}
F_{7} Re-elected	F_{6} Re-elected	F_{5}	F_{4}	F_{3}	F_{2}	F_{1}			

== 1806 and 1807 elections ==
DR_{7}	DR_{6}	DR_{5}	DR_{4}	DR_{3}	DR_{2}	DR_{1}			
DR_{8}	DR_{9}	DR_{10}	DR_{11}	DR_{12}	DR_{13}	DR_{14}	DR_{15}	DR_{16}	DR_{17}
Majority →									DR_{18}
DR_{27} Hold	DR_{26} Hold	DR_{25} Hold	DR_{24} Re-elected	DR_{23} Re-elected	DR_{22} Re-elected	DR_{21} Re-elected	DR_{20} Re-elected	DR_{19} Re-elected	DR_{18}
DR_{28} Gain	F_{6} Re-elected	F_{5}	F_{4}	F_{3}	F_{2}	F_{1}			

== 1808 and 1809 elections ==
DR_{7}	DR_{6}	DR_{5}	DR_{4}	DR_{3}	DR_{2}	DR_{1}			
DR_{8}	DR_{9}	DR_{10}	DR_{11}	DR_{12}	DR_{13}	DR_{14}	DR_{15}	DR_{16}	DR_{17}
Majority →									DR_{18}
DR_{27} Hold	DR_{26} Hold	DR_{25} Hold	DR_{24} Re-elected	DR_{23} Re-elected	DR_{22} Re-elected	DR_{21} Re-elected	DR_{20} Re-elected	DR_{19}	DR_{18}
F_{7} Gain	F_{6} Hold	F_{5} Re-elected	F_{4} Re-elected	F_{3}	F_{2}	F_{1}			

== 1810 and 1811 elections ==
The Democratic-Republicans held their majority unchanged. The minority Federalists had gone into the elections with such a small share of Senate seats (8 out of 34, or 23.5%) that they had won all of the elections, they would still not have controlled a majority.

DR_{7}	DR_{6}	DR_{5}	DR_{4}	DR_{3}	DR_{2}	DR_{1}			
DR_{8}	DR_{9}	DR_{10}	DR_{11}	DR_{12}	DR_{13}	DR_{14}	DR_{15}	DR_{16}	DR_{17}
Majority →									DR_{18} Hold
V_{1} F Loss	DR_{26} Re-elected	DR_{25} Re-elected	DR_{24} Re-elected	DR_{23} Re-elected	DR_{22} Re-elected	DR_{21} Re-elected	DR_{20} Hold	DR_{19} Hold	DR_{18} Hold
F_{7} Re-elected	F_{6}	F_{5}	F_{4}	F_{3}	F_{2}	F_{1}			

== 1812 and 1813 elections ==
Coinciding with President James Madison's re-election, the Democratic-Republican Party lost two seats but still retained an overwhelming majority in the Senate. As in recent elections, the minority Federalists had gone into the elections with such a small share of Senate seats that if they had won every one of the elections, they would still not have controlled a majority.

DR_{8}	DR_{7}	DR_{6}	DR_{5}	DR_{4}	DR_{3}	DR_{2}	DR_{1}		
DR_{9}	DR_{10}	DR_{11}	DR_{12}	DR_{13}	DR_{14}	DR_{15}	DR_{16}	DR_{17}	DR_{18}
Majority →									DR_{19}
V_{1} DR Loss	DR_{27} Hold	DR_{26} Re-elected	DR_{25} Re-elected	DR_{24} Hold	DR_{23} Hold	DR_{22} Hold	DR_{21} Hold	DR_{20} Hold	DR_{19}
V_{2} F Loss	F_{6} Gain	F_{5} Re-elected	F_{5}	F_{4}	F_{3}	F_{2}	F_{1}		

== 1814 and 1815 elections ==
The Democratic-Republicans lost a seat but still retained an overwhelming majority in the Senate. Unlike in recent elections, the minority Federalists had gone into the elections with a change of regaining their long-lost majority had they swept almost all the seats. However, only one seat switched parties. Two seats held by Democratic-Republicans were left unfilled until long after the next Congress began.

DR_{8}	DR_{7}	DR_{6}	DR_{5}	DR_{4}	DR_{3}	DR_{2}	DR_{1}		
DR_{9}	DR_{10}	DR_{11}	DR_{12}	DR_{13}	DR_{14}	DR_{15}	DR_{16}	DR_{17}	DR_{18}
Majority →									DR_{19} Re-elected
F_{9} Re-elected	F_{10} Re-elected	F_{11} Gain	V_{1} DR Loss	V_{2} DR Loss	DR_{23} Hold	DR_{22} Hold	DR_{21} Hold	DR_{20} Hold	DR_{19} Re-elected
F_{8} Re-elected	F_{7} Re-elected	F_{6}	F_{5}	F_{4}	F_{3}	F_{2}	F_{1}		

== 1816 and 1817 elections ==
DR_{9}	DR_{8}	DR_{7}	DR_{6}	DR_{5}	DR_{4}	DR_{3}	DR_{2}	DR_{1}	
DR_{10}	DR_{11}	DR_{12}	DR_{13}	DR_{14}	DR_{15} Gain	DR_{16} Gain	DR_{17} Re-elected	DR_{18} Hold	DR_{19} Hold
Majority →									DR_{20} Hold
F_{10}	F_{11} Hold	F_{12} Gain	F_{13} Gain	DR_{25} Gain	DR_{24} Gain	DR_{23} Hold	DR_{22} Hold	DR_{21} Hold	DR_{20} Hold
F_{9}	F_{8}	F_{7}	F_{6}	F_{5}	F_{4}	F_{3}	F_{2}	F_{1}	

== 1818 and 1819 elections ==
DR_{10}	DR_{9}	DR_{8}	DR_{7}	DR_{6}	DR_{5}	DR_{4}	DR_{3}	DR_{2}	DR_{1}
DR_{11}	DR_{12}	DR_{13}	DR_{14}	DR_{15}	DR_{16}	DR_{17}	DR_{18}	DR_{19} Re-elected	DR_{20} Re-elected
Majority →									DR_{21} Re-elected
V_{1} F Loss	DR_{30} New seat	DR_{29} Gain	DR_{28} Hold	DR_{27} Hold	DR_{26} Hold	DR_{25} Hold	DR_{24} Hold	DR_{23} Hold	DR_{22} Hold
V_{2} F Loss	F_{9}	F_{8}	F_{7}	F_{6}	F_{5}	F_{4}	F_{3}	F_{2}	F_{1}

== 1820 and 1821 elections ==
							DR_{1}	DR_{2}	DR_{3}
DR_{13}	DR_{12}	DR_{11}	DR_{10}	DR_{9}	DR_{8}	DR_{7}	DR_{6}	DR_{5}	DR_{4}
DR_{14}	DR_{15}	DR_{16}	DR_{17}	DR_{18}	DR_{19}	DR_{20}	DR_{21}	DR_{22}	DR_{23}
Majority →									DR_{24}
DR_{33} Hold	DR_{32} Re-elected	DR_{31} Re-elected	DR_{30} Re-elected	DR_{29} Re-elected	DR_{28} Re-elected	DR_{27}	DR_{26}	DR_{25}	DR_{24}
DR_{34} Hold	DR_{35} Hold	DR_{36} Gain	DR_{37} Gain	DR_{38} Gain	DR_{39} Gain	V_{1}	V_{2}	V_{3}	F_{4} Re-elected
							F_{1}	F_{2}	F_{3}

== 1822 and 1823 elections ==
						DR_{1}	DR_{2}	DR_{3}	DR_{4}
DR_{14}	DR_{13}	DR_{12}	DR_{11}	DR_{10}	DR_{9}	DR_{8}	DR_{7}	DR_{6}	DR_{5}
DR_{15}	DR_{16}	DR_{17}	DR_{18}	DR1_{19}	DR_{20}	DR_{21}	DR_{22}	DR_{23}	DR_{24}
Majority →									DR_{25}
DR_{34} Hold	DR_{33} Hold	DR_{32} Hold	DR_{31} Hold	DR_{30}	DR_{29}	DR_{28}	DR_{27}	DR_{26}	DR_{25}
DR_{35} Re-elected	DR_{36} Re-elected	DR_{37} Re-elected	DR_{38} Re-elected	DR_{39} Re-elected	DR_{40} Re-elected	DR_{41} Re-elected	DR_{42} Re-elected	DR_{43} Re-elected	DR_{44} Re-elected
						F_{1}	F_{2}	F_{3} Re-elected	V_{1}

== 1824 and 1825 elections ==
The elections of 1824 and 1825 saw the Jacksonians gain a majority over the Anti-Jacksonians (sometimes called the "National Republican Party").

Factions:	DRa/Fa_{#} = Adams-Clay factions	DRc_{#} = Crawford faction	DRj_{#} = Jackson faction

						AJ_{1} Gain	AJ_{2} Gain	AJ_{3} Gain	AJ_{4} Gain
DRc_{3}	DRc_{2}	DRc_{1}	DRa_{11}	DRa_{10}	DRa_{9}	V_{2} Fa Loss	V_{1} DR Loss	AJ_{6} Gain	AJ_{5} Gain
DRc_{4}	DRc_{5}	DRc_{6}	DRc_{7}	DRc_{8}	DRc_{9}	J_{1} Gain	J_{2} Gain	J_{3} Gain	J_{4} Gain
DRj_{3}	DRj_{2}	DRj_{1}	DRc_{20}	DRc_{19}	DRc_{18}	DRc_{17}	DRc_{16}	J_{6} Gain	J_{5} Gain
DRj_{4}	DRj_{5}	DRj_{6}	DRj_{7}	DRj_{8}	DRj_{9}	DRj_{10}	DRj_{11}	J_{7} Gain	J_{8} Gain
						Fa_{1}	Fa_{2}	Fa_{3}	Fa_{4}

== 1826 and 1827 elections ==
						AJ_{1}	AJ_{2}	AJ_{3}	AJ_{4}
AJ_{14}	AJ_{13}	AJ_{12}	AJ_{11}	AJ_{10}	AJ_{9}	AJ_{8}	AJ_{7}	AJ_{6}	AJ_{5}
AJ_{15} Re-elected	AJ_{16} Re-elected	AJ_{17} Re-elected	AJ_{18} Re-elected	AJ_{19} Hold	AJ_{20} Gain	V_{1} Gain	J_{27} Gain	J_{26} Gain	J_{25} Hold
Majority →									J_{24} Hold
J_{15}	J_{16}	J_{17}	J_{18}	J_{19} Re-elected	J_{20} Re-elected	J_{21} Re-elected	J_{22} Re-elected	J_{23} Hold	J_{24} Hold
J_{14}	J_{13}	J_{12}	J_{11}	J_{10}	J_{9}	J_{8}	J_{7}	J_{6}	J_{5}
						J_{1}	J_{2}	J_{3}	J_{4}

== 1828 and 1829 elections ==
						AJ_{1}	AJ_{2}	AJ_{3}	AJ_{4}
AJ_{14}	AJ_{13}	AJ_{12}	AJ_{11}	AJ_{10}	AJ_{9}	AJ_{8}	AJ_{7}	AJ_{6}	AJ_{5}
AJ_{15}	AJ_{16}	AJ_{17} Re-elected	AJ_{18} Re-elected	AJ_{19} Re-elected	AJ_{20} Gain	AJ_{21} Gain	AJ_{22} Gain	J_{26} Gain	J_{25} Gain
Majority →									J_{24} Hold
J_{15}	J_{16}	J_{17} Re-elected	J_{18} Re-elected	J_{19} Re-elected	J_{20} Re-elected	J_{21} Re-elected	J_{22} Hold	J_{23} Hold	J_{24} Hold
J_{14}	J_{13}	J_{12}	J_{11}	J_{10}	J_{9}	J_{8}	J_{7}	J_{6}	J_{5}
						J_{1}	J_{2}	J_{3}	J_{4}

== 1830 and 1831 elections ==
						AJ_{1}	AJ_{2}	AJ_{3}	AJ_{4}
AJ_{14}	AJ_{13}	AJ_{12}	AJ_{11}	AJ_{10}	AJ_{9}	AJ_{8}	AJ_{7}	AJ_{6}	AJ_{5}
AJ_{15} Re-elected	AJ_{16} Re-elected	AJ_{17} Re-elected	AJ_{18} Hold	AJ_{19} Hold	AJ_{20} Hold	V_{1}	N_{1} Gain	J_{26} Gain	J_{25} Gain
Majority →									J_{24} Gain
J_{15}	J_{16}	J_{17}	J_{18}	J_{19} Re-elected	J_{20} Re-elected	J_{21} Hold	J_{22} Hold	J_{23} Hold	J_{24} Gain
J_{14}	J_{13}	J_{12}	J_{11}	J_{10}	J_{9}	J_{8}	J_{7}	J_{6}	J_{5}
						J_{1}	J_{2}	J_{3}	J_{4}

== 1832 and 1833 elections ==
						AJ_{1}	AJ_{2}	AJ_{3}	AJ_{4}
AJ_{14}	AJ_{13}	AJ_{12}	AJ_{11}	AJ_{10}	AJ_{9}	AJ_{8}	AJ_{7}	AJ_{6}	AJ_{5}
AJ_{15}	AJ_{16} Re-elected	AJ_{17} Re-elected	AJ_{18} Re-elected	AJ_{19} Hold	AJ_{20} Hold	AJ_{21} Gain	AJ_{22} Gain	AJ_{23} Gain	N_{1}
Plurality ↑									N_{2}
J_{15}	J_{16} Re-elected	J_{17} Re-elected	J_{18} Re-elected	J_{19} Hold	J_{20} Gain	J_{21} Gain	V_{1} Loss	V_{2} Loss	N_{2}
J_{14}	J_{13}	J_{12}	J_{11}	J_{10}	J_{9}	J_{8}	J_{7}	J_{6}	J_{5}
						J_{1}	J_{2}	J_{3}	J_{4}

== 1834 and 1835 elections ==
						AJ_{1}	AJ_{2}	AJ_{3}	AJ_{4}
AJ_{14}	AJ_{13}	AJ_{12}	AJ_{11}	AJ_{10}	AJ_{9}	AJ_{8}	AJ_{7}	AJ_{6}	AJ_{5}
AJ_{15}	AJ_{16}	AJ_{17}	AJ_{18}	AJ_{19} Re-elected	AJ_{20} Re-elected	AJ_{21} Re-elected	AJ_{22} Hold	AJ_{23} Gain	AJ_{24} Gain
Plurality →									AJ_{24} Gain
J_{15} Re-elected	J_{16} Re-elected	J_{17} Re-elected	J_{18} Re-elected	J_{19} Gain	J_{20} Gain	J_{21} Gain	N_{1}	N_{2} Re-elected	V_{1} Loss
J_{14} Re-elected	J_{13}	J_{12}	J_{11}	J_{10}	J_{9}	J_{8}	J_{7}	J_{6}	J_{5}
						J_{1}	J_{2}	J_{3}	J_{4}

== 1836 and 1837 elections ==
				AJ_{1}	AJ_{2}	AJ_{3}	AJ_{4}	AJ_{5}	AJ_{6}
W_{16} Re-elected; New party	W_{15} Re-elected; New party	W_{14} Re-elected; New party	W_{13} Re-elected; New party	AJ_{12}	AJ_{11}	AJ_{10}	AJ_{9}	AJ_{8}	AJ_{7}
W_{17} Hold; New party	N_{1}	D_{34} Gain	D_{33} Gain	D_{32} Gain	D_{31} Hold; New party	D_{30} Hold; New party	D_{29} Re-elected; New party	D_{28} Re-elected; New party	D_{27} Re-elected; New party
Majority →									D_{27} Re-elected; New party
J_{17}	J_{18}	J_{19}	J_{20}	J_{21}	J_{22}	D_{23} Re-elected; New party	D_{24} Re-elected; New party	D_{25} Re-elected; New party	D_{26} Re-elected; New party
J_{16}	J_{15}	J_{14}	J_{13}	J_{12}	J_{11}	J_{10}	J_{9}	J_{8}	J_{7}
				J_{1}	J_{2}	J_{3}	J_{4}	J_{5}	J_{6}

== 1838 and 1839 elections ==
				D_{1}	D_{2}	D_{3}	D_{4}	D_{5}	D_{6}
D_{16}	D_{15}	D_{14}	D_{13}	D_{12}	D_{11}	D_{10}	D_{9}	D_{8}	D_{7}
D_{17}	D_{18}	D_{19}	D_{20}	D_{21}	D_{22}	D_{23}	D_{24}	D_{25}	D_{26} Re-elected
Majority →									D_{27} Re-elected
W_{17} Hold	W_{18} Gain	W_{19} Gain	W_{20} Gain	V_{4} D Loss	V_{3} D Loss	V_{2} D Loss	V_{1} D Loss	D_{28} Hold	D_{27} Re-elected
W_{16} Hold	W_{15} Re-elected	W_{14} Re-elected	W_{13} Re-elected	W_{12} Re-elected	W_{11} Re-elected	W_{10}	W_{9}	W_{8}	W_{7}
				W_{1}	W_{2}	W_{3}	W_{4}	W_{5}	W_{6}

== 1840 and 1841 elections ==
				D_{1}	D_{2}	D_{3}	D_{4}	D_{5}	D_{6}
D_{16}	D_{15}	D_{14}	D_{13}	D_{12}	D_{11}	D_{10}	D_{9}	D_{8}	D_{7}
D_{17} Re-elected	D_{18} Re-elected	D_{19} Re-elected	D_{20} Hold	D_{21} Hold	D_{22} Re-elected	V_{3} D Loss	V_{2}	V_{1}	W_{27} Gain
Majority →									W_{27} Gain
W_{17} Hold	W_{18} Re-elected	W_{19} Hold	W_{20} Hold	W_{21} Re-elected	W_{22} Gain	W_{23} Gain	W_{24} Gain	W_{25} Gain	W_{26} Gain
W_{16}	W_{15}	W_{14}	W_{13}	W_{12}	W_{11}	W_{10}	W_{9}	W_{8}	W_{7}
				W_{1}	W_{2}	W_{3}	W_{4}	W_{5}	W_{6}

== 1842 and 1843 elections ==
				D_{1}	D_{2}	D_{3}	D_{4}	D_{5}	D_{6}
D_{16} Re-elected	D_{15} Re-elected	D_{14} Re-elected	D_{13} Re-elected	D_{12} Re-elected	D_{11} Re-elected	D_{10}	D_{9}	D_{8}	D_{7}
D_{17} Re-elected	D_{18} Hold	D_{19} Hold	D_{20} Hold	D_{21} Hold	D_{22} Gain	D_{23} Gain	V_{2}	V_{1}	W_{27} Hold
Majority →									W_{26} Hold
W_{17}	W_{18}	W_{19}	W_{20}	W_{21}	W_{22}	W_{23}	W_{24} Re-elected	W_{25} Re-elected	W_{26} Hold
W_{16}	W_{15}	W_{14}	W_{13}	W_{12}	W_{11}	W_{10}	W_{9}	W_{8}	W_{7}
				W_{1}	W_{2}	W_{3}	W_{4}	W_{5}	W_{6}

== 1844 and 1845 elections ==
			D_{1}	D_{2}	D_{3}	D_{4}	D_{5}	D_{6}	D_{7}
D_{17}	D_{16}	D_{15}	D_{14}	D_{13}	D_{12}	D_{11}	D_{10}	D_{9}	D_{8}
D_{18}	D_{19}	D_{20} Re-elected	D_{21} Re-elected	D_{22} Re-elected	D_{23} Re-elected	D_{24} Gain	D_{25} Gain	D_{26} Gain	D_{27} Gain
Majority →									D_{27} Gain
W_{18} Re-elected	W_{19} Re-elected	W_{20} Hold	W_{21} Hold	W_{22} Hold	W_{23} Gain	W_{24} Gain	V_{1} W Loss	V_{2} New seat	V_{3} New seat
W_{17} Re-elected	W_{16}	W_{15}	W_{14}	W_{13}	W_{12}	W_{11}	W_{10}	W_{9}	W_{8}
			W_{1}	W_{2}	W_{3}	W_{4}	W_{5}	W_{6}	W_{7}

== 1846 and 1847 elections ==
	D_{1}	D_{2}	D_{3}	D_{4}	D_{5}	D_{6}	D_{7}	D_{8}	D_{9}
D_{19}	D_{18}	D_{17}	D_{16}	D_{15}	D_{14}	D_{13}	D_{12}	D_{11}	D_{10}
D_{20}	D_{21}	D_{22}	D_{23}	D_{24}	D_{25}	D_{26} Re-elected	D_{27} Re-elected	D_{28} Re-elected	D_{29} Re-elected
Majority →									D_{30} Hold
V_{1} W Loss	V_{2} New state	V_{3} New state	ID_{1} Gain	D_{35} Gain	D_{34} Gain	D_{33} Gain	D_{32} Hold	D_{31} Hold	D_{30} Hold
W_{19} Hold	W_{18} Hold	W_{17} Hold	W_{16} Re-elected	W_{15} Re-elected	W_{14} Re-elected	W_{13} Re-elected	W_{12}	W_{11}	W_{10}
	W_{1}	W_{2}	W_{3}	W_{4}	W_{5}	W_{6}	W_{7}	W_{8}	W_{9}

== 1848 and 1849 elections ==
D_{1}	D_{2}	D_{3}	D_{4}	D_{5}	D_{6}	D_{7}	D_{8}	D_{9}	D_{10}
D_{20}	D_{19}	D_{18}	D_{17}	D_{16}	D_{15}	D_{14}	D_{13}	D_{12}	D_{11}
D_{21}	D_{22}	D_{23}	D_{24}	D_{25} Re-elected	D_{26} Re-elected	D_{27} Re-elected	D_{28} Re-elected	D_{29} Re-elected	D_{30} Hold
Majority →									D_{31} Hold
W_{21} Gain	W_{22} Gain	W_{23} Gain	W_{24} Gain	W_{25} Gain	ID_{1}	FS_{1} Gain	D_{33} Gain	D_{32} Hold	D_{31} Hold
W_{20} Hold	W_{19} Re-elected	W_{18} Re-elected	W_{17} Re-elected	W_{16}	W_{15}	W_{14}	W_{13}	W_{12}	W_{11}
W_{1}	W_{2}	W_{3}	W_{4}	W_{5}	W_{6}	W_{7}	W_{8}	W_{9}	W_{10}

== 1850 and 1851 elections ==
D_{1}									
D_{2}	D_{3}	D_{4}	D_{5}	D_{6}	D_{7}	D_{8}	D_{9}	D_{10}	D_{11}
D_{21}	D_{20}	D_{19}	D_{18}	D_{17}	D_{16}	D_{15}	D_{14}	D_{13}	D_{12}
D_{22}	D_{23} Re-elected	D_{24} Re-elected	D_{25} Re-elected	D_{26} Re-elected	D_{27} Re-elected	D_{28} Re-elected	D_{29} Re-elected	D_{30} Hold	D_{31} Hold
Majority →									D_{32} Gain
V_{1} W Loss	V_{2} W Loss	FS_{1}	FS_{2}	V_{3} D Loss	V_{4} D Loss	V_{5} D Loss	D_{34} Gain	D_{33} Gain	D_{32} Gain
W_{21} Gain	W_{20} Gain	W_{19} Hold	W_{18} Re-elected	W_{17}	W_{16}	W_{15}	W_{14}	W_{13}	W_{12}
W_{2}	W_{3}	W_{4}	W_{5}	W_{6}	W_{7}	W_{8}	W_{9}	W_{10}	W_{11}
W_{1}									

== 1852 and 1853 elections ==
D_{1}									
D_{2}	D_{3}	D_{4}	D_{5}	D_{6}	D_{7}	D_{8}	D_{9}	D_{10}	D_{11}
D_{21}	D_{20}	D_{19}	D_{18}	D_{17}	D_{16}	D_{15}	D_{14}	D_{13}	D_{12}
D_{22}	D_{23}	D_{24}	D_{25}	D_{26}	D_{27} Re-elected	D_{28} Re-elected	D_{29} Re-elected	D_{30} Re-elected	D_{31} Re-elected
Majority →									D_{32} Hold
KN_{1} Gain	FS_{1}	FS_{2}	V_{1} D Loss	V_{2} D Loss	D_{36} Gain	D_{35} Gain	D_{34} Hold	D_{33} Hold	D_{32} Hold
V_{3} W Loss	V_{4} W Loss	V_{5} W Loss	W_{18} Gain	W_{17} Hold	W_{16} Hold	W_{15} Re-elected	W_{14}	W_{13}	W_{12}
W_{2}	W_{3}	W_{4}	W_{5}	W_{6}	W_{7}	W_{8}	W_{9}	W_{10}	W_{11}
W_{1}									

== 1854 and 1855 elections ==
D_{1}									
D_{2}	D_{3}	D_{4}	D_{5}	D_{6}	D_{7}	D_{8}	D_{9}	D_{10}	D_{11}
D_{21}	D_{20}	D_{19}	D_{18}	D_{17}	D_{16}	D_{15}	D_{14}	D_{13}	D_{12}
D_{22}	D_{23}	D_{24}	D_{25}	D_{26} Re-elected	D_{27} Re-elected	D_{28} Re-elected	D_{29} Hold	D_{30} Gain	D_{31} Gain
Majority →									D_{32} Gain
V_{2}	V_{3}	V_{4}	V_{5} D Loss	V_{6} D Loss	V_{7} D Loss	V_{8} D Loss	V_{9} D Loss	D_{33} Gain	D_{32} Gain
V_{1} W Loss	KN_{1}	FS_{2} Gain	FS_{1}	R_{3} Gain	R_{2} Gain	R_{1} Gain	W_{14} Hold	W_{13} Re-elected	W_{12} Re-elected
W_{2}	W_{3}	W_{4}	W_{5}	W_{6}	W_{7}	W_{8}	W_{9}	W_{10}	W_{11}
W_{1}									

== 1856 and 1857 elections ==
The young Republican Party assumed its position as one of the United States's two main political parties. The Whigs and Free Soilers were gone by the time the next Congress began.

D_{1}									
D_{2}	D_{3}	D_{4}	D_{5}	D_{6}	D_{7}	D_{8}	D_{9}	D_{10}	D_{11}
D_{21}	D_{20}	D_{19}	D_{18}	D_{17}	D_{16}	D_{15}	D_{14}	D_{13}	D_{12}
D_{22}	D_{23}	D_{24}	D_{25}	D_{26} Re-elected	D_{27} Re-elected	D_{28} Re-elected	D_{29} Re-elected	D_{30} Re-elected	D_{31} Re-elected
Majority →									D_{32} Hold
FS_{1}	KN_{1}	KN_{2} Gain	V_{1} W Loss	V_{2}	V_{3}	V_{4}	D_{34} Gain	D_{33} Hold	D_{32} Hold
R_{15} Gain	R_{14} Re-elected; Diff. party	R_{13} Hold	R_{12} Re-elected	R_{11} Re-elected	R_{10}	R_{9}	R_{8}	R_{7}	R_{6}
W_{2}	W_{3}	R_{1} Gain	R_{2} Gain	R_{3} Gain	R_{4} Gain	R_{5} Gain	R_{1}	R_{2}	R_{3}
W_{1}									

== 1858 and 1859 elections ==
D_{3}	D_{2}	D_{1}							
D_{4}	D_{5}	D_{6}	D_{7}	D_{8}	D_{9}	D_{10}	D_{11}	D_{12}	D_{13}
D_{23}	D_{22}	D_{21}	D_{20}	D_{19}	D_{18}	D_{17}	D_{16}	D_{15}	D_{14}
D_{24}	D_{25}	D_{26} Re-elected	D_{27} Re-elected	D_{28} Re-elected	D_{29} Re-elected	D_{30} Re-elected	D_{31} Re-elected	D_{32} Re-elected	D_{33} Hold
Majority →									D_{34} Hold
R_{24} Gain	R_{25} Gain	KN_{1}	KN_{2}	V_{1} D Loss	D_{38} Gain	D_{37} Gain	D_{36} Hold	D_{35} Hold	D_{34} Hold
R_{23} Gain	R_{22} Gain	R_{21} Gain	R_{20} Re-elected	R_{19} Re-elected	R_{18} Re-elected	R_{17}	R_{16}	R_{15}	R_{14}
R_{4}	R_{5}	R_{6}	R_{7}	R_{8}	R_{9}	R_{10}	R_{11}	R_{12}	R_{13}
R_{3}	R_{2}	R_{1}							

== 1860 and 1861 elections ==
V_{3} D Loss	V_{2} D Loss	V_{1} D Loss							
D_{1}	D_{2}	D_{3}	D_{4}	D_{5}	D_{6}	D_{7}	D_{8}	D_{9}	D_{10}
D_{20}	D_{19}	D_{18}	D_{17}	D_{16}	D_{15}	D_{14}	D_{13}	D_{12}	D_{11}
D_{21}	D_{23}	D_{22}	D_{24}	D_{25} Re-elected	D_{26} Re-elected	D_{27} Hold	D_{28} Hold	D_{29} Hold	D_{30} Gain
Plurality ↑									KN_{1}
R_{21} Re-elected	R_{22} Re-elected	R_{23} Re-elected	R_{24} Re-elected	R_{25} Hold	R_{26} Hold	R_{27} Gain	R_{28} Gain	R_{29} Gain	KN_{1}
R_{20} Re-elected	R_{19}	R_{18}	R_{17}	R_{16}	R_{15}	R_{14}	R_{13}	R_{12}	R_{11}
R_{1}	R_{2}	R_{3}	R_{4}	R_{5}	R_{6}	R_{7}	R_{8}	R_{9}	R_{10}
V_{4} D Loss	V_{5} D Loss	V_{6} D Loss							

== 1862 and 1863 elections ==
V_{4}	V_{3}	V_{2}	V_{1}						
V_{5}	V_{6}	V_{7} No race	V_{8} No race	V_{9} No race	V_{10} No race	D_{1}	D_{2}	D_{3}	D_{4}
U_{4} Hold	U_{3}	U_{2}	U_{1}	D_{10} Gain	D_{9} Hold	D_{8} Hold	D_{7} Re-elected	D_{6}	D_{5}
U_{5} Hold	UU_{1} Gain	R_{32} Gain	R_{31} Gain	R_{30} Re-elected	R_{29} Re-elected	R_{28} Hold	R_{27} Hold	R_{26} Re-elected	R_{25} Re-elected
Majority →									R_{25} Re-elected
R_{15}	R_{16}	R_{17}	R_{18}	R_{19}	R_{20}	R_{21}	R_{22} Re-elected	R_{23} Re-elected	R_{24} Re-elected
R_{14}	R_{13}	R_{12}	R_{11}	R_{10}	R_{9}	R_{8}	R_{7}	R_{6}	R_{5}
V_{16}	V_{15}	V_{14}	V_{13}	V_{12}	V_{11}	R_{1}	R_{2}	R_{3}	R_{4}
V_{17}	V_{18}	V_{19}	V_{20}						

== 1864 and 1865 elections ==
These elections, corresponding with Abraham Lincoln's re-election as president, saw the Republicans gain two seats. As these elections occurred during the Civil War, most of the Southern states were absent.

V_{5} Seceded	V_{4} Seceded	V_{3} Seceded	V_{2}	V_{1}					
V_{6} Seceded	V_{7} Seceded	V_{8} Seceded	V_{9} Seceded	V_{10} Seceded	V_{11} Seceded	D_{1}	D_{2}	D_{3}	D_{4}
UU_{2}	UU_{3}	UU_{4}	U_{1}	U_{2}	D_{9} Gain	D_{8} Hold	D_{7} Re-elected	D_{6}	D_{5}
UU_{1}	R_{33} Gain	R_{32} Gain	R_{31} Re-elected new party	R_{30} Hold	R_{29} Hold	R_{28} Hold	R_{27} Re-elected	R_{26} Re-elected	R_{25} Re-elected
Majority →									R_{25} Re-elected
R_{15}	R_{16}	R_{17}	R_{18}	R_{19}	R_{20}	R_{21}	R_{22}	R_{23} Re-elected	R_{24} Re-elected
R_{14}	R_{13}	R_{12}	R_{11}	R_{10}	R_{9}	R_{8}	R_{7}	R_{6}	R_{5}
V_{17}	V_{16}	V_{15}	V_{14}	V_{13}	V_{12} U Loss	R_{1}	R_{2}	R_{3}	R_{4}
V_{18}	V_{19}	V_{20}	V_{21}	V_{22}					

== 1866 and 1867 elections ==
V_{6} Seceded	V_{5} Seceded	V_{4} Seceded	V_{3} Seceded	V_{2}	V_{1}				
V_{7} Seceded	V_{8} Seceded	V_{9} Seceded	V_{10} Seceded	D_{1}	D_{2}	D_{3}	D_{4}	D_{5}	D_{6}
R_{37} Hold	R_{38} Gain	R_{39} Gain	UU_{1}	U_{1}	U_{2}	D_{10} Gain	D_{9} Gain	D_{8}	D_{7}
R_{36} Hold	R_{35} Hold	R_{34} Hold	R_{33} Hold	R_{32} Hold	R_{31} Hold	R_{30} Hold	R_{29} Re-elected	R_{28} Re-elected	R_{17} Re-elected
Majority →									R_{17} Re-elected
R_{17}	R_{18}	R_{19}	R_{20}	R_{21}	R_{22}	R_{23}	R_{24}	R_{25} Re-elected	R_{26} Re-elected
R_{16}	R_{15}	R_{14}	R_{13}	R_{12}	R_{11}	R_{10}	R_{9}	R_{8}	R_{7}
V_{14}	V_{13}	V_{12}	V_{11}	R_{1}	R_{2}	R_{3}	R_{4}	R_{5}	R_{6}
V_{15}	V_{16}	V_{17}	V_{18}	V_{19}	V_{20}				

== 1868 and 1869 elections ==
D_{3}	D_{2}	D_{1}	V_{4} Seceded	V_{3} Seceded	V_{2} Seceded	V_{1}			
D_{4}	D_{5} Hold	D_{6} Hold	D_{7} Gain	D_{8} Gain	D_{9} Gain	R_{57} Gain	R_{56} Gain	R_{55} Gain	R_{54} Hold
R_{44} Re-elected	R_{45} Re-elected	R_{46} Re-elected	R_{47} Re-elected	R_{48} Hold	R_{49} Hold	R_{50} Hold	R_{51} Hold	R_{52} Hold	R_{53} Hold
R_{43} Re-elected	R_{42} Re-elected	R_{41} Re-elected	R_{40}	R_{39}	R_{38}	R_{37}	R_{36}	R_{35}	R_{34}
Majority →									R_{34}
R_{24}	R_{25}	R_{26}	R_{27}	R_{28}	R_{29}	R_{30}	R_{31}	R_{32}	R_{33}
R_{23}	R_{22}	R_{21}	R_{20}	R_{19}	R_{18}	R_{17}	R_{16}	R_{15}	R_{14}
R_{4}	R_{5}	R_{6}	R_{7}	R_{8}	R_{9}	R_{10}	R_{11}	R_{12}	R_{13}
R_{3}	R_{2}	R_{1}	V_{5}	V_{6}	V_{7}	V_{8}			

== 1870 and 1871 elections ==
D_{7}	D_{6}	D_{5}	D_{4}	D_{3}	D_{2}	D_{1}			
D_{8} Hold	D_{9} Hold	D_{10} Hold	D_{11} Gain	D_{12} Gain	D_{13} Gain	D_{14} Gain	V_{1} D Loss	V_{2} R Loss	R_{58} Hold
R_{48} Re-elected	R_{49} Hold	R_{50} Hold	R_{51} Hold	R_{52} Hold	R_{53} Hold	R_{54} Hold	R_{55} Hold	R_{56} Hold	R_{57} Hold
R_{47} Re-elected	R_{46} Re-elected	R_{45} Re-elected	R_{44} Re-elected	R_{43} Re-elected	R_{42}	R_{41}	R_{40}	R_{39}	R_{38}
Majority →									R_{37}
R_{28}	R_{29}	R_{30}	R_{31}	R_{32}	R_{33}	R_{34}	R_{35}	R_{36}	R_{37}
R_{27}	R_{26}	R_{25}	R_{24}	R_{23}	R_{22}	R_{21}	R_{20}	R_{19}	R_{18}
R_{8}	R_{9}	R_{10}	R_{11}	R_{12}	R_{13}	R_{14}	R_{15}	R_{16}	R_{17}
R_{7}	R_{6}	R_{5}	R_{4}	R_{3}	R_{2}	R_{1}			

== 1872 and 1873 elections ==
D_{7}	D_{6}	D_{5}	D_{4}	D_{3}	D_{2}	D_{1}			
D_{8}	D_{9}	D_{10}	D_{11}	D_{12}	D_{13}	D_{14}	D_{15} Hold	D_{16} Hold	D_{17} Hold
R_{48} Hold	R_{49} Hold	R_{50} Hold	R_{51} Hold	R_{52} Hold	R_{53} Hold	R_{54} Gain	V_{1} R Loss	D_{19} Gain	D_{18} Gain
R_{47} Hold	R_{46} Hold	R_{45} Hold	R_{44} Re-elected	R_{43} Re-elected	R_{42} Re-elected	R_{41} Re-elected	R_{40} Re-elected	R_{39} Re-elected	R_{38} Re-elected
Majority →									R_{37} Re-elected
R_{28}	R_{29}	R_{30}	R_{31}	R_{32}	R_{33}	R_{34}	R_{35}	R_{36}	R_{37} Re-elected
R_{27}	R_{26}	R_{25}	R_{24}	R_{23}	R_{22}	R_{21}	R_{20}	R_{19}	R_{18}
R_{8}	R_{9}	R_{10}	R_{11}	R_{12}	R_{13}	R_{14}	R_{15}	R_{16}	R_{17}
R_{7}	R_{6}	R_{5}	R_{4}	R_{3}	R_{2}	R_{1}			

== 1874 and 1875 elections ==
D_{7}	D_{6}	D_{5}	D_{4}	D_{3}	D_{2}	D_{1}			
D_{8}	D_{9}	D_{10}	D_{11}	D_{12}	D_{13}	D_{14}	D_{15} Re-elected	D_{16} Re-elected	D_{17} Hold
D_{27} Gain	D_{26} Gain	D_{25} Gain	D_{24} Gain	D_{23} Gain	D_{22} Gain	D_{21} Gain	D_{20} Gain	D_{19} Gain	D_{18} Hold
D_{28} Gain	AM_{1} Gain	V_{1}	LR_{2}	LR_{1}	R_{42} Hold	R_{41} Hold	R_{40} Hold	R_{39} Hold	R_{38} Hold
Majority →									R_{37} Hold
R_{28}	R_{29}	R_{30}	R_{31}	R_{32}	R_{33} Re-elected	R_{34} Re-elected	R_{35} Hold	R_{36} Hold	R_{37} Hold
R_{27}	R_{26}	R_{25}	R_{24}	R_{23}	R_{22}	R_{21}	R_{20}	R_{19}	R_{18}
R_{8}	R_{9}	R_{10}	R_{11}	R_{12}	R_{13}	R_{14}	R_{15}	R_{16}	R_{17}
R_{7}	R_{6}	R_{5}	R_{4}	R_{3}	R_{2}	R_{1}			

== 1876 and 1877 elections ==
D_{8}	D_{7}	D_{6}	D_{5}	D_{4}	D_{3}	D_{2}	D_{1}		
D_{9}	D_{10}	D_{11}	D_{12}	D_{13}	D_{14}	D_{15}	D_{16}	D_{17}	D_{18}
D_{28} Hold	D_{27} Hold	D_{26} Hold	D_{25} Re-elected	D_{24} Re-elected	D_{23} Re-elected	D_{22} Re-elected	D_{21}	D_{20}	D_{19}
D_{29} Hold	D_{30} Hold	D_{31} Gain	D_{32} Gain	D_{33} Gain	D_{34} Gain	D_{35} Gain	I_{1} Gain	AM_{1}	R_{39} Hold
Majority →									R_{39} Hold
R_{29} Re-elected	R_{30} Re-elected	R_{31} Re-elected	R_{32} Re-elected	R_{33} Re-elected	R_{34} Hold	R_{35} Hold	R_{36} Hold	R_{37} Hold	R_{38} Hold
R_{28}	R_{27}	R_{26}	R_{25}	R_{24}	R_{23}	R_{22}	R_{21}	R_{20}	R_{19}
R_{9}	R_{10}	R_{11}	R_{12}	R_{13}	R_{14}	R_{15}	R_{16}	R_{17}	R_{18}
R_{8}	R_{7}	R_{6}	R_{5}	R_{4}	R_{3}	R_{2}	R_{1}		

== 1878 and 1879 elections ==
D_{8}	D_{7}	D_{6}	D_{5}	D_{4}	D_{3}	D_{2}	D_{1}		
D_{9}	D_{10}	D_{11}	D_{12}	D_{13}	D_{14}	D_{15}	D_{16}	D_{17}	D_{18}
D_{28}	D_{27}	D_{26}	D_{25}	D_{24}	D_{23}	D_{22}	D_{21}	D_{20}	D_{19}
D_{29} Re-elected	D_{30} Re-elected	D_{31} Hold	D_{32} Hold	D_{33} Hold	D_{34} Hold	D_{35} Hold	D_{36} Gain	D_{37} Gain	D_{38} Gain
Majority →									D_{39} Gain
R_{29} Hold	R_{30} Hold	R_{31} Gain	V_{1} R loss	AM_{1}	I_{1}	D_{42} Gain	D_{41} Gain	D_{40} Gain	D_{39} Gain
R_{28} Hold	R_{27} Re-elected	R_{26} Re-elected	R_{25} Re-elected	R_{24} Re-elected	R_{23} Re-elected	R_{22} Re-elected	R_{21}	R_{20}	R_{19}
R_{9}	R_{10}	R_{11}	R_{12}	R_{13}	R_{14}	R_{15}	R_{16}	R_{17}	R_{18}
R_{8}	R_{7}	R_{6}	R_{5}	R_{4}	R_{3}	R_{2}	R_{1}		

== 1880 and 1881 elections ==
D_{8}	D_{7}	D_{6}	D_{5}	D_{4}	D_{3}	D_{2}	D_{1}		
D_{9}	D_{10}	D_{11}	D_{12}	D_{13}	D_{14}	D_{15}	D_{16}	D_{17}	D_{18}
D_{28}	D_{27}	D_{26}	D_{25}	D_{24}	D_{23}	D_{22}	D_{21}	D_{20}	D_{19}
D_{29} Re-elected	D_{30} Re-elected	D_{31} Re-elected	D_{33} Re-elected	D_{33} Hold	D_{34} Hold	D_{35} Hold	D_{36} Gain	D_{37} Gain	I_{1}
Plurality ↓									RA_{1} Gain
R_{29} Hold	R_{30} Hold	R_{31} Gain	R_{32} Gain	R_{33} Gain	R_{34} Gain	R_{35} Gain	R_{36} Gain	R_{37} Gain	RA_{1} Gain
R_{28} Hold	R_{27} Hold	R_{26} Re-elected	R_{25} Re-elected	R_{24} Re-elected	R_{23} Re-elected	R_{22}	R_{21}	R_{20}	R_{19}
R_{9}	R_{10}	R_{11}	R_{12}	R_{13}	R_{14}	R_{15}	R_{16}	R_{17}	R_{18}
R_{8}	R_{7}	R_{6}	R_{5}	R_{4}	R_{3}	R_{2}	R_{1}		

== 1882 and 1883 elections ==
D_{8}	D_{7}	D_{6}	D_{5}	D_{4}	D_{3}	D_{2}	D_{1}		
D_{9}	D_{10}	D_{11}	D_{12}	D_{13}	D_{14}	D_{15}	D_{16}	D_{17}	D_{18}
D_{28} Re-elected	D_{27} Re-elected	D_{26} Re-elected	D_{25} Re-elected	D_{24} Re-elected	D_{23}	D_{22}	D_{21}	D_{20}	D_{19}
D_{29} Re-elected	D_{30} Re-elected	D_{31} Re-elected	D_{32} Re-elected	D_{33} Re-elected	D_{34} Hold	D_{35} Hold	D_{36} Gain	V_{1} R Loss	RA_{2} Gain
Majority, with Readjusters in caucus ↓									RA_{1}
R_{29} Re-elected	R_{30} Re-elected	R_{31} Hold	R_{32} Hold	R_{33} Hold	R_{34} Hold	R_{35} Hold	R_{36} Gain	R_{37} Gain	RA_{1}
R_{28} Re-elected	R_{27} Re-elected	R_{26}	R_{25}	R_{24}	R_{23}	R_{22}	R_{21}	R_{20}	R_{19}
R_{9}	R_{10}	R_{11}	R_{12}	R_{13}	R_{14}	R_{15}	R_{16}	R_{17}	R_{18}
R_{8}	R_{7}	R_{6}	R_{5}	R_{4}	R_{3}	R_{2}	R_{1}		

== 1884 and 1885 elections ==
D_{8}	D_{7}	D_{6}	D_{5}	D_{4}	D_{3}	D_{2}	D_{1}		
D_{9}	D_{10}	D_{11}	D_{12}	D_{13}	D_{14}	D_{15}	D_{16}	D_{17}	D_{18}
D_{28} Re-elected	D_{27} Re-elected	D_{26} Re-elected	D_{25} Re-elected	D_{24} Re-elected	D_{23} Re-elected	D_{22}	D_{21}	D_{20}	D_{19}
D_{29} Re-elected	D_{30} Hold	D_{31} Hold	D_{32} Hold	D_{33} Hold	D_{34} Hold	V_{1} D Loss	V_{2} R Loss	V_{3} R Loss	RA_{1}
Majority due to three vacancies ↓									RA_{2}
R_{29} Re-elected	R_{30} Re-elected	R_{31} Re-elected	R_{32} Re-elected	R_{33} Re-elected	R_{34} Hold	R_{35} Hold	R_{36} Hold	R_{37} Gain	RA_{2}
R_{28} Re-elected	R_{27}	R_{26}	R_{25}	R_{24}	R_{23}	R_{22}	R_{21}	R_{20}	R_{19}
R_{9}	R_{10}	R_{11}	R_{12}	R_{13}	R_{14}	R_{15}	R_{16}	R_{17}	R_{18}
R_{8}	R_{7}	R_{6}	R_{5}	R_{4}	R_{3}	R_{2}	R_{1}		

== 1886 and 1887 elections ==
D_{8}	D_{7}	D_{6}	D_{5}	D_{4}	D_{3}	D_{2}	D_{1}		
D_{9}	D_{10}	D_{11}	D_{12}	D_{13}	D_{14}	D_{15}	D_{16}	D_{17}	D_{18}
D_{28} Re-elected	D_{27} Re-elected	D_{26} Re-elected	D_{25}	D_{24}	D_{23}	D_{22}	D_{21}	D_{20}	D_{19}
D_{29} Re-elected	D_{30} Hold	D_{31} Hold	D_{32} Hold	D_{33} Gain	D_{34} Gain	D_{35} Gain	D_{36} Gain	V_{1} D Loss	RA_{2}
Majority due to vacancy→									R_{38} Gain
R_{29} Re-elected	R_{30} Re-elected	R_{31} Re-elected	R_{32} Re-elected	R_{33} Hold	R_{34} Hold	R_{35} Hold	R_{36} Hold	R_{37} Hold	R_{38} Gain
R_{28} Re-elected	R_{27} Re-elected	R_{26} Re-elected	R_{25}	R_{24}	R_{23}	R_{22}	R_{21}	R_{20}	R_{19}
R_{9}	R_{10}	R_{11}	R_{12}	R_{13}	R_{14}	R_{15}	R_{16}	R_{17}	R_{18}
R_{8}	R_{7}	R_{6}	R_{5}	R_{4}	R_{3}	R_{2}	R_{1}		

== 1888 and 1889 elections ==
These elections coincided with Benjamin Harrison's victory over incumbent President Grover Cleveland. Both parties were unchanged in the general elections, but later special elections would give Republicans an eight-seat majority, mostly from newly admitted states.

D_{8}	D_{7}	D_{6}	D_{5}	D_{4}	D_{3}	D_{2}	D_{1}		
D_{9}	D_{10}	D_{11}	D_{12}	D_{13}	D_{14}	D_{15}	D_{16}	D_{17}	D_{18}
D_{28} Re-elected	D_{27} Re-elected	D_{26} Re-elected	D_{25} Re-elected	D_{24}	D_{23}	D_{22}	D_{21}	D_{20}	D_{19}
D_{29} Re-elected	D_{30} Re-elected	D_{31} Re-elected	D_{32} Re-elected	D_{33} Re-elected	D_{34} Re-elected	D_{35} Re-elected	D_{36} Re-elected	D_{37} Gain	V_{1} R Loss
Majority due to vacancy →									R_{38} Gain
R_{29} Re-elected	R_{30} Re-elected	R_{31} Re-elected	R_{32} Re-elected	R_{33} Re-elected	R_{39} Re-elected	R_{35} Hold	R_{36} Hold	R_{37} Hold	R_{38} Gain
R_{28} Re-elected	R_{27} Re-elected	R_{26}	R_{25}	R_{24}	R_{23}	R_{22}	R_{21}	R_{20}	R_{19}
R_{9}	R_{10}	R_{11}	R_{12}	R_{13}	R_{14}	R_{15}	R_{16}	R_{17}	R_{18}
R_{8}	R_{7}	R_{6}	R_{5}	R_{4}	R_{3}	R_{2}	R_{1}		

== 1890 and 1891 elections ==
								D_{1}	D_{2}
D_{12}	D_{11}	D_{10}	D_{9}	D_{8}	D_{7}	D_{6}	D_{5}	D_{4}	D_{3}
D_{13}	D_{14}	D_{15}	D_{16}	D_{17}	D_{18}	D_{19}	D_{20}	D_{21}	D_{22}
D_{32} Re-elected	D_{31} Re-elected	D_{30} Re-elected	D_{29} Re-elected	D_{28} Re-elected	D_{27} Re-elected	D_{26} Re-elected	D_{25}	D_{24}	D_{23}
D_{33} Re-elected	D_{34} Hold	D_{35} Hold	D_{36} Hold	D_{37} Hold	D_{38} Gain	D_{39} Gain	D_{40} Gain	I_{1} Gain	P_{1} Gain
Majority →									R_{43} New seat
R_{33} Re-elected	R_{34} Re-elected	R_{35} Re-elected	R_{36} Re-elected	R_{37} Re-elected	R_{38} Re-elected	R_{39} Re-elected	R_{40} Re-elected	R_{41} Hold	R_{42} Hold
R_{32} Re-elected	R_{31}	R_{30}	R_{29}	R_{28}	R_{27}	R_{26}	R_{25}	R_{24}	R_{23}
R_{13}	R_{14}	R_{15}	R_{16}	R_{17}	R_{18}	R_{19}	R_{20}	R_{21}	R_{22}
R_{12}	R_{11}	R_{10}	R_{9}	R_{8}	R_{7}	R_{6}	R_{5}	R_{4}	R_{3}
								R_{1}	R_{2}

== 1892 and 1893 elections ==
						D_{1}	D_{2}	D_{3}	D_{4}
D_{14}	D_{13}	D_{12}	D_{11}	D_{10}	D_{9}	D_{8}	D_{7}	D_{6}	D_{5}
D_{15}	D_{16}	D_{17}	D_{18}	D_{19}	D_{20}	D_{21}	D_{22}	D_{23}	D_{24}
D_{34} Re-elected	D_{33} Re-elected	D_{32} Re-elected	D_{31} Re-elected	D_{30} Re-elected	D_{29}	D_{28}	D_{27}	D_{26}	D_{25}
D_{35} Re-elected	D_{36} Re-elected	D_{37} Re-elected	D_{38} Hold	D_{39} Hold	D_{30} Gain	D_{41} Gain	D_{42} Gain	V_{1} D loss	V_{2} R loss
Majority with vacancies →							D_{43} Gain	V_{1} D loss	V_{3} R loss
R_{35} Re-elected	R_{36} Re-elected	R_{37} Hold	SR_{1} Gain	P_{1}	P_{2}	P_{3} Gain	D_{43} Gain	V_{1} D loss	V_{4} R loss
R_{34} Re-elected	R_{33} Re-elected	R_{32} Re-elected	R_{31} Re-elected	R_{30} Re-elected	R_{29} Re-elected	R_{28}	R_{27}	R_{26}	R_{25}
R_{15}	R_{16}	R_{17}	R_{18}	R_{19}	R_{20}	R_{21}	R_{22}	R_{23}	R_{24}
R_{14}	R_{13}	R_{12}	R_{11}	R_{10}	R_{9}	R_{8}	R_{7}	R_{6}	R_{5}
						R_{1}	R_{2}	R_{3}	R_{4}

== 1894 and 1895 elections ==
						D_{1}	D_{2}	D_{3}	D_{4}
D_{14}	D_{13}	D_{12}	D_{11}	D_{10}	D_{9}	D_{8}	D_{7}	D_{6}	D_{5}
D_{15}	D_{16}	D_{17}	D_{18}	D_{19}	D_{20}	D_{21}	D_{22}	D_{23}	D_{24}
D_{34} Re-elected	D_{33} Re-elected	D_{32} Re-elected	D_{31} Re-elected	D_{30}	D_{29}	D_{28}	D_{27}	D_{26}	D_{25}
D_{35} Hold	D_{36} Hold	D_{37} Hold	D_{38} Hold	D_{39} Hold	D_{40} Retired	P_{4} Gain	P_{3}	V_{4} R Loss	V_{1}
No majority								V_{4} R Loss	V_{2}
R_{35} Hold	R_{36} Hold	R_{37} Gain	R_{38} Gain	R_{39} Gain	SR_{1}	P_{1}	P_{2}	V_{4} R Loss	V_{3}
R_{34} Hold	R_{33} Hold	R_{32} Hold	R_{31} Hold	R_{30} Hold	R_{29} Re-elected	R_{28} Re-elected	R_{27} Re-elected	R_{26} Re-elected	R_{25} Re-elected
R_{15}	R_{16}	R_{17}	R_{18}	R_{19}	R_{20}	R_{21}	R_{22} Re-elected	R_{23} Re-elected	R_{24} Re-elected
R_{14}	R_{13}	R_{12}	R_{11}	R_{10}	R_{9}	R_{8}	R_{7}	R_{6}	R_{5}
						R_{1}	R_{2}	R_{3}	R_{4}

== 1896 and 1897 elections ==
					D_{1}	D_{2}	D_{3}	D_{4}	D_{5}
D_{15}	D_{14}	D_{13}	D_{12}	D_{11}	D_{10}	D_{9}	D_{8}	D_{7}	D_{6}
D_{16}	D_{17}	D_{18}	D_{19}	D_{20}	D_{21}	D_{22}	D_{23}	D_{24}	D_{25}
P_{3} Re-elected	P_{4} Hold	P_{5} Gain	D_{32} Gain	D_{31} Hold	D_{30} Hold	D_{29} Hold	D_{28} Hold	D_{27} Re-elected	D_{26} Re-elected
P_{2}	P_{1}	S_{2} Re-elected	S_{1}	SR_{2} Re-elected	SR_{1} Gain	R_{46} Gain	R_{45} Gain	R_{44} Gain	V_{1} D Loss
Majority →								R_{44} Gain	V_{2}
R_{36} Re-elected	R_{37} Re-elected	R_{38} Re-elected	R_{39} Hold	R_{40} Gain	R_{41} Gain	R_{42} Gain	R_{43} Gain	R_{44} Gain	V_{3} R Loss
R_{35} Re-elected	R_{34} Re-elected	R_{33} Re-elected	R_{32} Re-elected	R_{31}	R_{30}	R_{29}	R_{28}	R_{27}	R_{26}
R_{16}	R_{17}	R_{18}	R_{19}	R_{20}	R_{21}	R_{22}	R_{23}	R_{24}	R_{25}
R_{15}	R_{14}	R_{13}	R_{12}	R_{11}	R_{10}	R_{9}	R_{8}	R_{7}	R_{6}
					R_{1}	R_{2}	R_{3}	R_{4}	R_{5}

== 1898 and 1899 elections ==
					D_{1}	D_{2}	D_{3}	D_{4}	D_{5}
D_{15}	D_{14}	D_{13}	D_{12}	D_{11}	D_{10}	D_{9}	D_{8}	D_{7}	D_{6}
D_{16}	D_{17}	D_{18}	D_{19}	D_{20} Re-elected	D_{21} Re-elected	D_{22} Re-elected	D_{23} Re-elected	D_{24} Hold	D_{25} Gain
R_{50} Gain	SR_{3} Re-elected	SR_{2}	SR_{1}	S_{1}	S_{2}	P_{1}	P_{2}	P_{3}	P_{4}
R_{49} Gain	R_{48} Gain	R_{47} Gain	R_{46} Gain	R_{45} Gain	R_{44} Gain	R_{43} Hold	V_{1} D Loss	V_{2} D Loss	V_{3} D Loss
Majority →						R_{43} Hold	V_{1} D Loss	V_{2} D Loss	V_{3} D Loss
Majority →						R_{42} Re-elected	V_{6} R Loss	V_{5} SR Loss	V_{4} P Loss
R_{36} Re-elected	R_{37} Re-elected	R_{38} Re-elected	R_{39} Re-elected	R_{40} Re-elected	R_{41} Re-elected	R_{42} Re-elected	V_{6} R Loss	V_{5} SR Loss	V_{4} P Loss
R_{35} Re-elected	R_{34} Re-elected	R_{33}	R_{32}	R_{31}	R_{30}	R_{29}	R_{28}	R_{27}	R_{26}
R_{16}	R_{17}	R_{18}	R_{19}	R_{20}	R_{21}	R_{22}	R_{23}	R_{24}	R_{25}
R_{15}	R_{14}	R_{13}	R_{12}	R_{11}	R_{10}	R_{9}	R_{8}	R_{7}	R_{6}
					R_{1}	R_{2}	R_{3}	R_{4}	R_{5}

== 1900 and 1901 elections ==
					D_{1}	D_{2}	D_{3}	D_{4}	D_{5}
D_{15}	D_{14}	D_{13}	D_{12}	D_{11}	D_{10}	D_{9}	D_{8}	D_{7}	D_{6}
D_{16} Re-elected	D_{17} Re-elected	D_{18} Re-elected	D_{19} Re-elected	D_{20} Re-elected	D_{21} Hold	D_{22} Hold	D_{23} Hold	D_{24} Hold	D_{25} Hold
SR_{1}	S_{1}	S_{2}	P_{1}	P_{2}	P_{3}	P_{4}	D_{28} Gain	D_{27} Gain	D_{26} Gain
SR_{2}	SR_{3} Gain	R_{48} Gain	R_{47} Re-elected	R_{46} Re-elected	R_{45} Re-elected	R_{44} Hold	R_{43} Re-elected	V_{5} D Loss	V_{1}
Majority →							R_{43} Re-elected	V_{4} R Loss	V_{2}
R_{36} Re-elected	R_{37} Re-elected	R_{38} Re-elected	R_{39} Re-elected	R_{40} Re-elected	R_{41} Re-elected	R_{42} Hold	R_{43} Re-elected	V_{4} R Loss	V_{3}
R_{35} Re-elected	R_{34}	R_{33}	R_{32}	R_{31}	R_{30}	R_{29}	R_{28}	R_{27}	R_{26}
R_{16}	R_{17}	R_{18}	R_{19}	R_{20}	R_{21}	R_{22}	R_{23}	R_{24}	R_{25}
R_{15}	R_{14}	R_{13}	R_{12}	R_{11}	R_{10}	R_{9}	R_{8}	R_{7}	R_{6}
					R_{1}	R_{2}	R_{3}	R_{4}	R_{5}

== 1902 and 1903 elections ==
					D_{1}	D_{2}	D_{3}	D_{4}	D_{5}
D_{15}	D_{14}	D_{13}	D_{12}	D_{11}	D_{10}	D_{9}	D_{8}	D_{7}	D_{6}
D_{16}	D_{17}	D_{18}	D_{19}	D_{20}	D_{21}	D_{22} Re-elected	D_{23} Re-elected	D_{24} Re-elected	D_{25} Hold
R_{54} Gain	R_{55} Gain	V_{1} D Loss	D_{32} Gain	D_{31} Gain	D_{30} Gain	D_{29} Gain	D_{28} Gain	D_{27} Hold	D_{26} Hold
R_{53} Gain	R_{52} Gain	R_{51} Hold	R_{50} Hold	R_{49} Re-elected	R_{48} Re-elected	R_{47} Re-elected	R_{46} Re-elected	R_{45} Re-elected	V_{2}
Majority →								R_{44} Re-elected	V_{2}
R_{36}	R_{37}	R_{38} Re-elected	R_{29} Re-elected	R_{40} Re-elected	R_{41} Re-elected	R_{42} Re-elected	R_{43} Re-elected	R_{44} Re-elected	V_{3}
R_{35}	R_{34}	R_{33}	R_{32}	R_{31}	R_{30}	R_{29}	R_{28}	R_{27}	R_{26}
R_{16}	R_{17}	R_{18}	R_{19}	R_{20}	R_{21}	R_{22}	R_{23}	R_{24}	R_{25}
R_{15}	R_{14}	R_{13}	R_{12}	R_{11}	R_{10}	R_{9}	R_{8}	R_{7}	R_{6}
					R_{1}	R_{2}	R_{3}	R_{4}	R_{5}

== 1904 and 1905 elections ==
					D_{1}	D_{2}	D_{3}	D_{4}	D_{5}
D_{15}	D_{14}	D_{13}	D_{12}	D_{11}	D_{10}	D_{9}	D_{8}	D_{7}	D_{6}
D_{16}	D_{17}	D_{18}	D_{19}	D_{20}	D_{21}	D_{22}	D_{23}	D_{24}	D_{25}
R_{53} Hold	R_{54} Hold	R_{55} Hold	R_{56} Gain	D_{31} Gain	D_{30} Re-elected	D_{29} Re-elected	D_{28} Re-elected	D_{27} Re-elected	D_{26}
R_{52} Hold	R_{51} Hold	R_{50} Hold	R_{49} Hold	R_{48} Re-elected	R_{47} Re-elected	R_{46} Re-elected	R_{45} Re-elected	R_{44} Re-elected	V_{1} D Loss
Majority →								R_{44} Re-elected	V_{2} D Loss
R_{36} Re-elected	R_{37} Re-elected	R_{38} Re-elected	R_{39} Re-elected	R_{40} Re-elected	R_{41} Re-elected	R_{42} Re-elected	R_{43} Re-elected	R_{44} Re-elected	V_{3} R Loss
R_{35} Re-elected	R_{34}	R_{33}	R_{32}	R_{31}	R_{30}	R_{29}	R_{28}	R_{27}	R_{26}
R_{16}	R_{17}	R_{18}	R_{19}	R_{20}	R_{21}	R_{22}	R_{23}	R_{24}	R_{25}
R_{15}	R_{14}	R_{13}	R_{12}	R_{11}	R_{10}	R_{9}	R_{8}	R_{7}	R_{6}
					R_{1}	R_{2}	R_{3}	R_{4}	R_{5}

== 1906 and 1907 elections ==
					D_{1}	D_{2}	D_{3}	D_{4}	D_{5}
D_{15}	D_{14}	D_{13}	D_{12}	D_{11}	D_{10}	D_{9}	D_{8}	D_{7}	D_{6}
D_{16}	D_{17}	D_{18}	D_{19} Re-elected	D_{20} Re-elected	D_{21} Re-elected	D_{22} Re-elected	D_{23} Re-elected	D_{24} Re-elected	D_{25} Re-elected
R_{56} Hold	R_{57} Gain	R_{58} Gain	R_{59} Gain	R_{60} Gain	V_{1} R Loss	V_{2} D Loss	D_{28} Hold	D_{27} Hold	D_{26} Hold
R_{55} Hold	R_{54} Hold	R_{53} Hold	R_{52} Hold	R_{51} Re-elected	R_{50} Re-elected	R_{49} Re-elected	R_{48} Re-elected	R_{47} Re-elected	R_{46} Re-elected
Majority due to vacancies→									R_{45} Re-elected
R_{36}	R_{37}	R_{38}	R_{39}	R_{40}	R_{41}	R_{42}	R_{43} Re-elected	R_{44} Re-elected	R_{45} Re-elected
R_{35}	R_{34}	R_{33}	R_{32}	R_{31}	R_{30}	R_{29}	R_{28}	R_{27}	R_{26}
R_{16}	R_{17}	R_{18}	R_{19}	R_{20}	R_{21}	R_{22}	R_{23}	R_{24}	R_{25}
R_{15}	R_{14}	R_{13}	R_{12}	R_{11}	R_{10}	R_{9}	R_{8}	R_{7}	R_{6}
					R_{1}	R_{2}	R_{3}	R_{4}	R_{5}

== 1908 and 1909 elections ==
				D_{1}	D_{2}	D_{3}	D_{4}	D_{5}	D_{6}
D_{16}	D_{15}	D_{14}	D_{13}	D_{12}	D_{11}	D_{10}	D_{9}	D_{8}	D_{7}
D_{17}	D_{18}	D_{19}	D_{20} Re-elected	D_{21} Re-elected	D_{22} Re-elected	D_{23} Re-elected	D_{24} Re-elected	D_{25} Re-elected	D_{26} Re-elected
R_{57} Hold	R_{58} Hold	R_{59} Gain	V_{1} R loss	V_{2} D loss	D_{31} Gain	D_{30} Gain	D_{29} Hold	D_{28} Hold	D_{27} Hold
R_{56} Hold	R_{55} Hold	R_{54} Hold	R_{53} Re-elected	R_{52} Re-elected	R_{51} Re-elected	R_{50} Re-elected	R_{49} Re-elected	R_{48} Re-elected	R_{47} Re-elected
Majority due to vacancies→									R_{46} Re-elected
R_{37}	R_{38}	R_{39}	R_{40}	R_{41}	R_{42}	R_{43}	R_{44} Re-elected	R_{45} Re-elected	R_{46} Re-elected
R_{36}	R_{35}	R_{34}	R_{33}	R_{32}	R_{31}	R_{30}	R_{29}	R_{28}	R_{27}
R_{17}	R_{18}	R_{19}	R_{20}	R_{21}	R_{22}	R_{23}	R_{24}	R_{25}	R_{26}
R_{16}	R_{15}	R_{14}	R_{13}	R_{12}	R_{11}	R_{10}	R_{9}	R_{8}	R_{7}
				R_{1}	R_{2}	R_{3}	R_{4}	R_{5}	R_{6}

== 1910 and 1911 elections ==
Although the 17th Amendment was not passed until 1913, some states elected their Senators directly before its passage. Oregon pioneered direct election and experimented with different measures over several years until it succeeded in 1907. Soon after, Nebraska followed suit and laid the foundation for other states to adopt measures reflecting the people's will. By 1912, as many as 29 states elected senators either as nominees of their party's primary or in conjunction with a general election.

				D_{1}	D_{2}	D_{3}	D_{4}	D_{5}	D_{6}
D_{16}	D_{15}	D_{14}	D_{13}	D_{12}	D_{11}	D_{10}	D_{9}	D_{8}	D_{7}
D_{17}	D_{18}	D_{19}	D_{20}	D_{21}	D_{22}	D_{23}	D_{24}	D_{25}	D_{26}
D_{36} Gain	D_{35} Gain	D_{34} Gain	D_{33} Gain	D_{32} Hold	D_{31} Hold	D_{30} Re-elected	D_{29} Re-elected	D_{28} Re-elected	D_{27}
D_{37} Gain	D_{38} Gain	D_{39} Gain	D_{40} Gain	V_{1} D Loss	V_{2} R Loss	R_{50} Hold	R_{49} Hold	R_{48} Hold	R_{47} Hold
Majority →									R_{46} Hold
R_{37} Re-elected	R_{38} Re-elected	R_{39} Re-elected	R_{40} Re-elected	R_{41} Re-elected	R_{42} Re-elected	R_{43} Re-elected	R_{44} Re-elected	R_{45} Re-elected	R_{46} Hold
R_{36} Re-elected	R_{35}	R_{34}	R_{33}	R_{32}	R_{31}	R_{30}	R_{29}	R_{28}	R_{27}
R_{17}	R_{18}	R_{19}	R_{20}	R_{21}	R_{22}	R_{23}	R_{24}	R_{25}	R_{26}
R_{16}	R_{15}	R_{14}	R_{13}	R_{12}	R_{11}	R_{10}	R_{9}	R_{8}	R_{7}
				R_{1}	R_{2}	R_{3}	R_{4}	R_{5}	R_{6}

== 1912 and 1913 elections ==
		D_{1}	D_{2}	D_{3}	D_{4}	D_{5}	D_{6}	D_{7}	D_{8}
D_{18}	D_{17}	D_{16}	D_{15}	D_{14}	D_{13}	D_{12}	D_{11}	D_{10}	D_{9}
D_{19}	D_{20}	D_{21}	D_{22}	D_{23}	D_{24}	D_{25}	D_{26}	D_{27}	D_{28}
D_{38} Hold	D_{37} Hold	D_{36} Hold	D_{35} Re-elected	D_{34} Re-elected	D_{33} Re-elected	D_{32} Re-elected	D_{31} Re-elected	D_{30}	D_{29}
D_{39} Hold	D_{40} Hold	D_{41} Gain	D_{42} Gain	D_{43} Gain	D_{44} Gain	D_{45} Gain	D_{46} Gain	V_{1}	V_{2} D Loss
Majority with vacancies →							D_{47} Gain		
R_{39} Re-elected	R_{40} Hold	R_{41} Hold	R_{42} Hold	R_{43} Hold	R_{44} Gain	R_{45} Gain	D_{47} Gain	V_{4} R Loss	V_{3} R Loss
R_{38} Re-elected	R_{37} Re-elected	R_{36} Re-elected	R_{35} Re-elected	R_{34} Re-elected	R_{33}	R_{32}	R_{31}	R_{30}	R_{29}
R_{19}	R_{20}	R_{21}	R_{22}	R_{23}	R_{24}	R_{25}	R_{26}	R_{27}	R_{28}
R_{18}	R_{17}	R_{16}	R_{15}	R_{14}	R_{13}	R_{12}	R_{11}	R_{10}	R_{9}
		R_{1}	R_{2}	R_{3}	R_{4}	R_{5}	R_{6}	R_{7}	R_{8}

== See also elections ==
- List of elections in the United States
