= 2015 United States House of Representatives elections =

- May 12, 2015 – September 10, 2015

3 of the 435 seats in the U.S. House of Representatives 218 seats needed for a majority
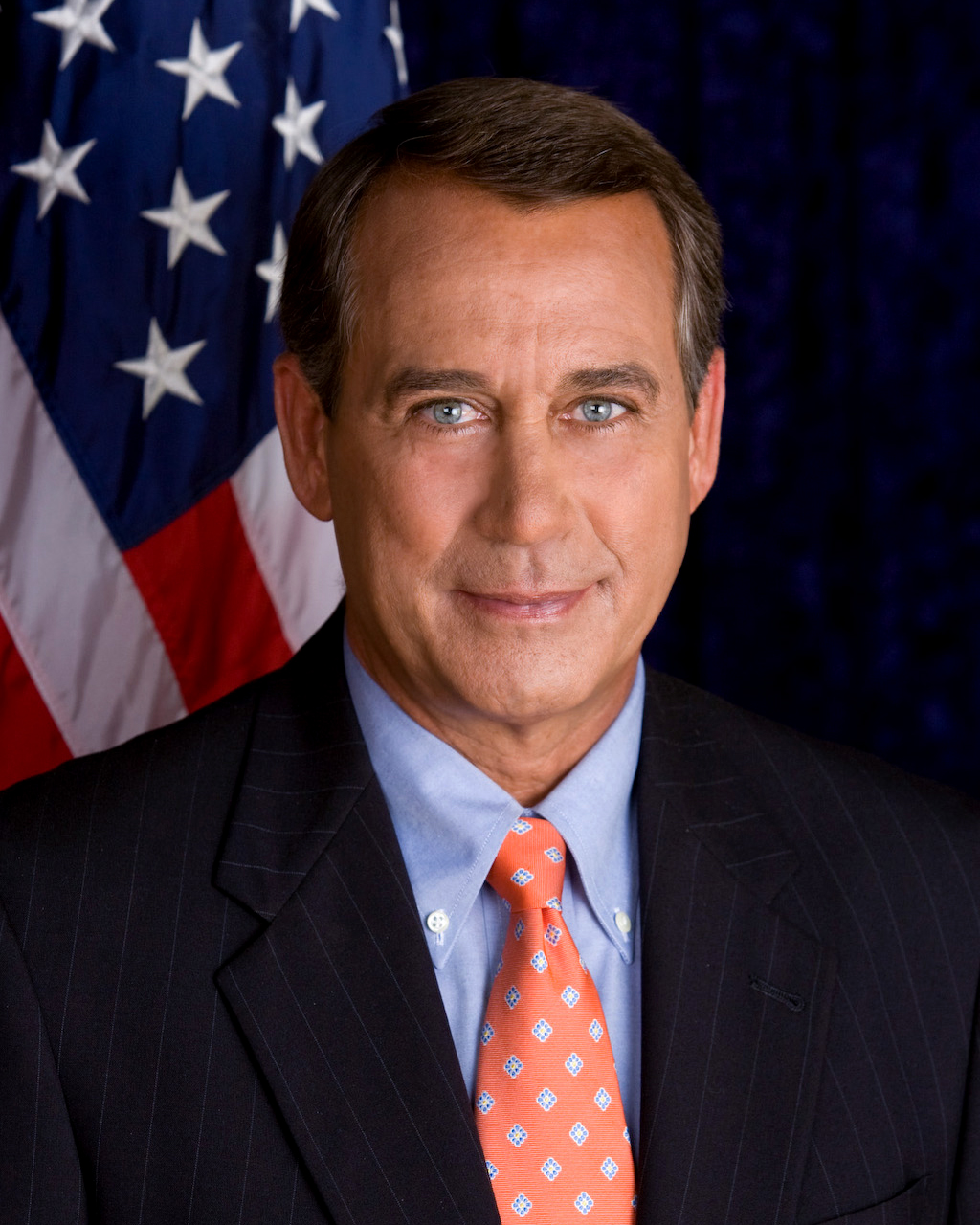

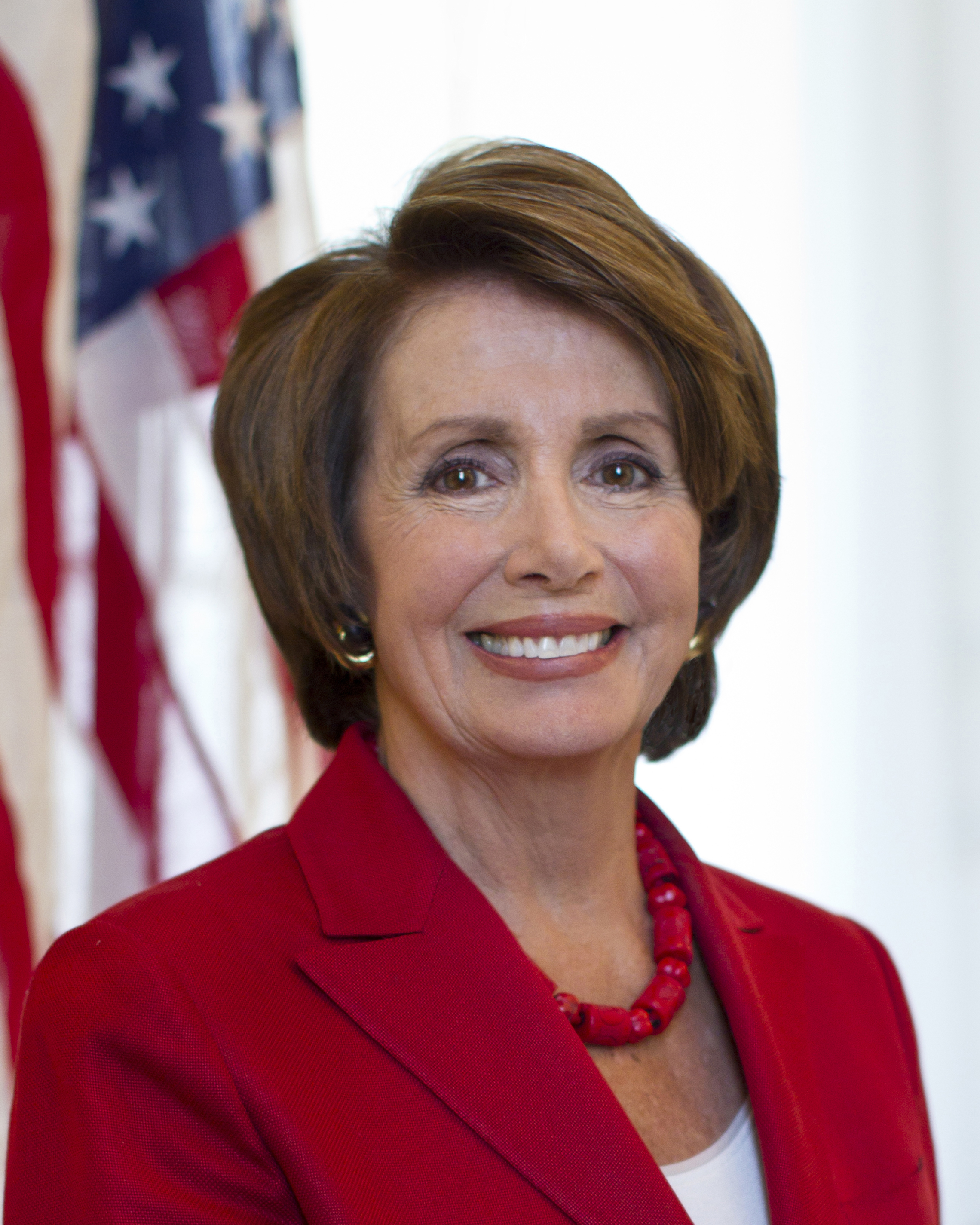
	Majority party	Minority party
Leader	John Boehner	Nancy Pelosi
Party	Republican	Democratic
Leader since	February 2, 2006 (Note: On October 29, 2015, John Boehner resigned as leader, and Representative of the 1st district of Wisconsin, Paul Ryan was elected leader.)	January 3, 2003
Leader's seat	Ohio 8th	California 12th
Last election	247 seats	188 seats
Seats won	3	0
Seat change	Steady	Steady
Popular vote	123,910	61,405
Percentage	64.1%	31.8%
- Results: Republican hold

There were three special elections to the United States House of Representatives in 2015 during the 115th United States Congress.

All of the elections were won by the party previously holding the seat. Therefore, there were no net changes in party.

Elections are sorted by date and district.

== Summary ==
District	Incumbent			This race	
District	Member	Party	First elected	Results	Candidates
New York 11	Michael Grimm	Republican	2010	Incumbent resigned January 5, 2015. A special election was held May 5, 2015. Republican hold.	▌ ✓ Dan Donovan (Republican) 58.33%; ▌Vincent Gentile (Democratic) 40.11%; ▌James Lane (Green) 1.33%
Mississippi 1	Alan Nunnelee	Republican	2010	Incumbent died February 6, 2015. A special election was held May 12, 2015. Republican hold.	▌ ✓ Trent Kelly (Republican) 69.97%; ▌Walter Zinn (Democratic) 30.03%
Illinois 18	Aaron Schock	Republican	2008	Incumbent resigned March 31, 2015. A special election was held September 10, 2015. Republican hold.	▌ ✓ Darin LaHood (Republican) 68.8%; ▌Rob Mellon (Democratic) 31.1%

== New York's 11th congressional district ==
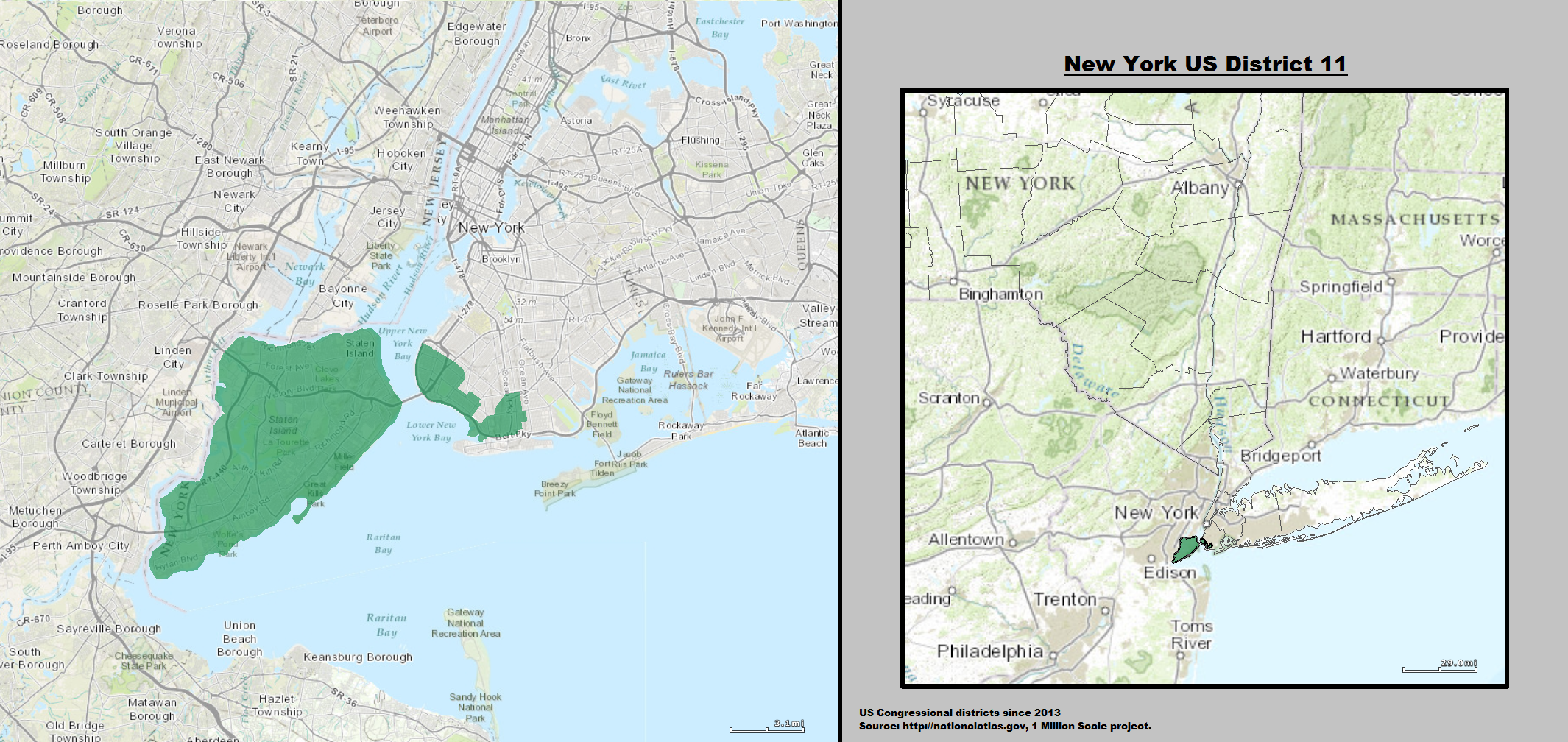
New York's 11th congressional district

A special election was held on May 5, 2015, to fill the vacancy of Michael Grimm, who resigned from Congress on January 5, 2015, after pleading guilty to tax evasion. Local party leaders in Brooklyn and Staten Island selected their nominees, replacing a primary. Republican nominee Dan Donovan was elected to the seat, defeating his Democratic challenger Vincent J. Gentile.

2015 New York's 11th congressional district special election
Party	Candidate	Votes	%
Republican	Dan Donovan	19,065	44.85
Conservative	Dan Donovan	4,289	10.09
Independence	Dan Donovan	1,443	3.39
Total	Dan Donovan	24,797	58.33
Democratic	Vincent Gentile	15,595	36.69
Working Families	Vincent Gentile	1,454	3.42
Total	Vincent Gentile	17,049	40.11
Green	James Lane	567	1.33
Write-in		96	0.23
Total votes		42,509	100.00
Republican hold			

== Mississippi's 1st congressional district ==
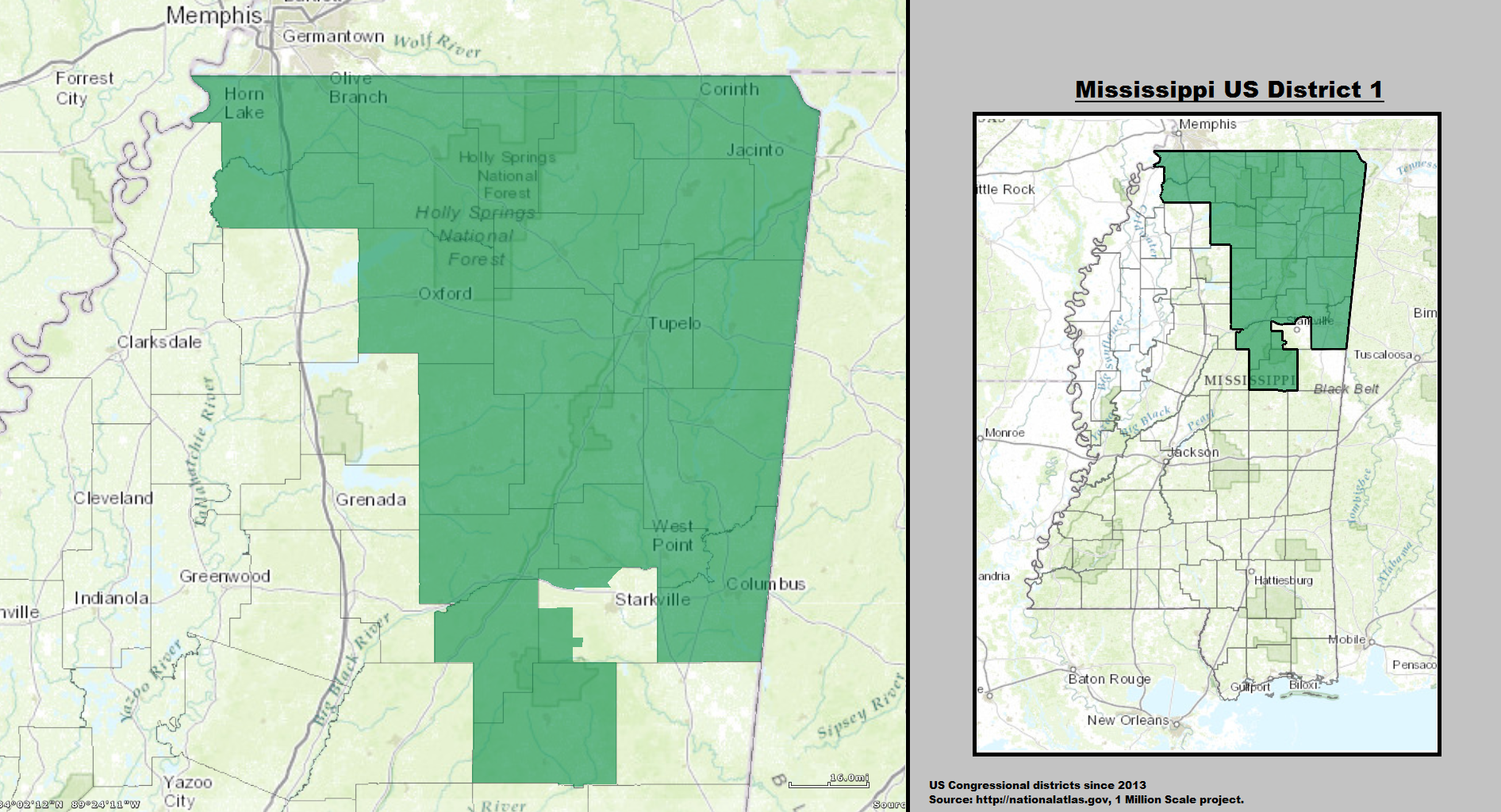
Mississippi's 1st congressional district

Representative Alan Nunnelee died on February 6, 2015, after health complications with his brain. Governor Phil Bryant called for a nonpartisan blanket primary to be held on May 12, 2015, with a runoff between the top two finishers on June 2, 2015. The primary consisted of thirteen candidates, with all but one being affiliated with the Republican Party. In the runoff, Republican Trent Kelly defeated Democrat Walter Zinn by a wide margin.

2015 Mississippi's 1st congressional district special runoff election
Party	Candidate	Votes	%
Nonpartisan	Trent Kelly	69,516	69.97
Nonpartisan	Walter Zinn	29,831	30.03
Total votes		99,347	100.00
Republican hold			

== Illinois's 18th congressional district ==
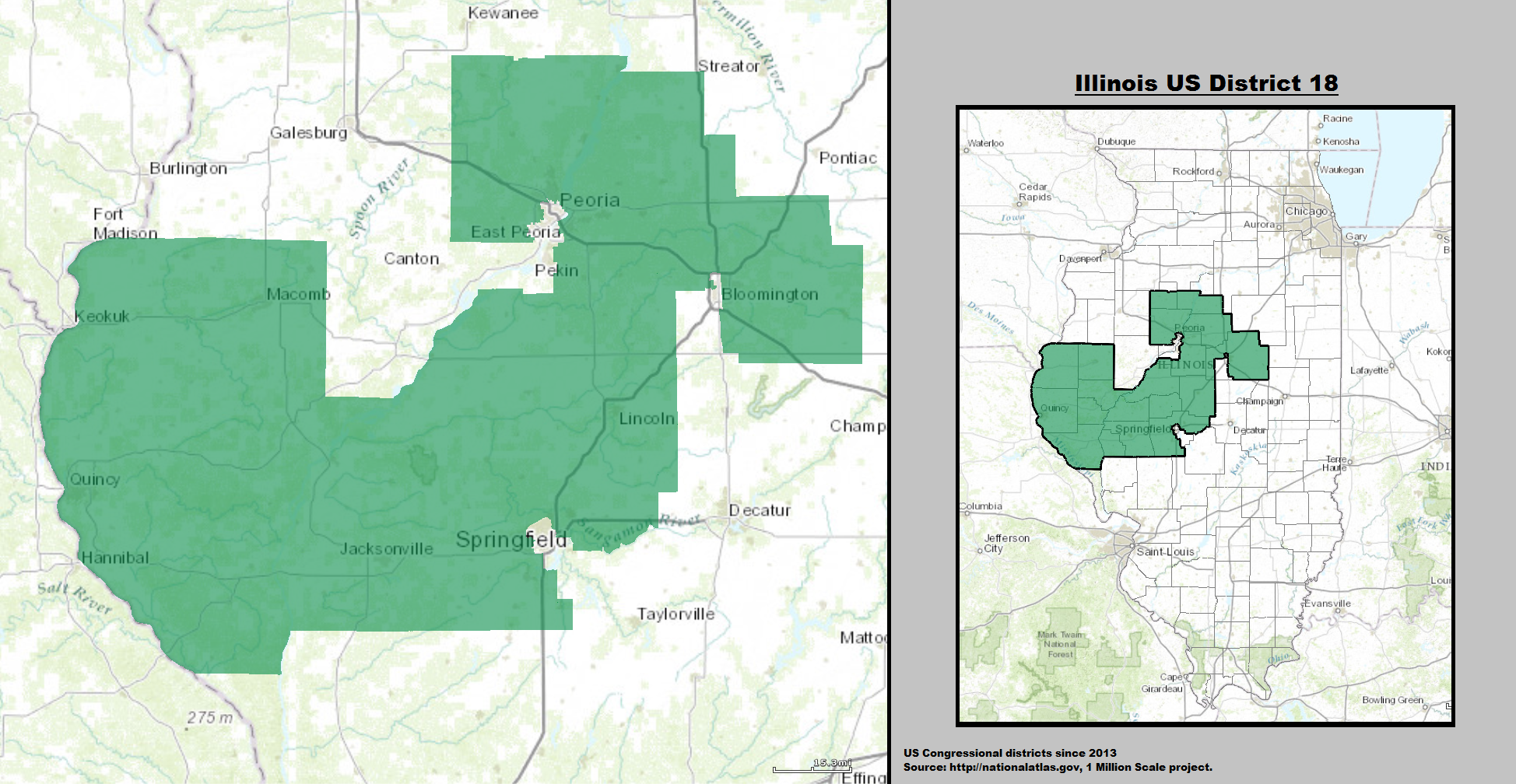
Illinois's 18th congressional district

A special election was held on September 10, 2015, following the resignation of Aaron Schock on March 31, 2015, amid a scandal involving his use of public and campaign funds. Primary elections were set for July 7 to comply with the UOCAVA, despite Illinois law calling for a stricter deadline. Republican nominee Darin LaHood defeated Democratic nominee Rob Mellon by over thirty percentage points.

2015 Illinois's 18th congressional district special election
Party	Candidate	Votes	%
Republican	Darin LaHood	35,329	68.84
Democratic	Rob Mellon	15,979	31.14
Write-in	Constant "Conner" Vlakancic	7	0.01
Write-in	Roger K. Davis	4	0.01
Total votes		51,319	100.00
Republican hold			
