= Congressional stagnation in the United States =

Theory about incumbency re-election

Congressional stagnation is an American political theory that attempts to explain the high rate of incumbency re-election to the United States House of Representatives. In recent years this rate has been well over 90 per cent, with rarely more than 5–10 incumbents losing their House seats every election cycle. The theory has existed since the 1970s, when political commentators were beginning to notice the trend, with political science author and professor David Mayhew first writing about the "vanishing marginals" theory in 1974.

The term "congressional stagnation" originates from the theory that Congress has become stagnant through the continuous re-election of the majority of incumbents, preserving the status quo.

== Overview ==
In the 2000 Congressional Elections, out of the 435 Congressional districts in which there were elections, 359 were listed as "safe" by Congressional Quarterly. In all of these 359, there was no uncertainty as to who would win. The results a week later confirmed that very few House races were competitive. The 2000 House election resulted in a net change of only four seats (+1 for the Democrats, −2 for the Republicans and the electing of an additional independent). In total, 98% of all incumbents were re-elected.

Congressional elections are stagnant, and because of the high invincibility of House incumbents, very few districts are truly competitive, with elections shifting very few seats from one party to another. One of the most important reasons as to why incumbents are nearly unbeatable is because they normally have much better financed campaigns than their opponents. Other potential theories include the aggressive redrawing of congressional boundaries known as gerrymandering, from a more historical perspective the loss of party alignment, or the simple fact of being an incumbent.

In recent years, legislators in the U.S. Senate and in the House, have been championing the Bipartisan Campaign Reform Act as a tool to combat the growing stagnation of Congress, claiming that it would revitalize elections.

== History of electoral stagnation ==
Competition in house elections has been on the decline for several decades. As mentioned, it was more than 30 years ago when David Mayhew first commented on vanishing marginals, the decreasing number of congressional districts that were being won by close vote margins. In typical election years between 1956 and 1964, about 94 districts were decided by a margin of 10 percentage points or fewer (55%-to-45% of the vote or closer). From 1966 to 1972, the number of marginal districts dropped to about 59. Since Mayhew's observation, competition has eroded further and is now in very short supply.

One important indicator of competition is the partisan turnover of districts – the number of districts won by candidates of different parties in consecutive election years. Turnover is not essential for competition, but one would expect serious competition to result in a substantial amount of turnover. While some elections have produced a great deal of turnover, other elections have produced next to none. In general, the amount of turnover declined in the second half of the 20th century, especially in the last few decades.

The typical election in the first half of the 20th century resulted in a shift of about 55 seats between the parties (specifically the period 1900–1924 produced a median seat turnover of 53.9 seats and 1926–1950 produced a 56.1 change). Competitiveness, at least measured by the likelihood of an election changing the partisan outcome in a district, is now less than half it was throughout much of the 20th century.

Without competition, the public at large can lose interest in the processes of elections. It might be expected that a large number of citizens would come to regard the process as unresponsive and crooked, grow cynical, and stay home on election day. This is seen as one of the many potential reasons as to why the United States has one of the lowest voter turnout rates in the western world.

== Reasons for stagnation ==
=== Incumbent quality ===
The fact that incumbents have won at least one previous election means that they have some qualities that appeal to voters. So re-election rates greater than fifty percent are not surprising. This effect can explain the re-election rates in the US Senate from 1946 to 1978, but has difficulty explaining the increase in the re-election rates from 1980 to 2010.

=== Incumbency financial advantage ===
One of the main reasons incumbents seem to have such a complete advantage over challengers is because of their significantly better financed campaigns. In the 1990s the typical incumbent in a contested election had somewhere between 83 and 93 percent of what was spent by all the candidates in the district, and these incumbents typically captured about 64 to 67 percent of the vote.

The figures should be used with discretion, however, as half the incumbents dominated spending in their area to an even greater extent. If anything, this analysis may even understate how great the incumbency campaign finance advantage predetermines the election outcome, as the analysis examines only contested elections. For instance, in the 2000 election cycle, 64 incumbents ran for reelection unchallenged because the opposition party did not even mount a nominal challenge.

Specifically for the 2000 election, incumbents spent 92.8 percent of total money and received 67.3 percent of the vote. In the elections from 1992 to 2000, there were 1,643 contested House seats in which there was a challenged incumbent. In 905 of these (55 percent of the total), the incumbents spent 84% or more of the total spending. These elections resulted in 904 victories for the incumbents, and one loss.

The single exception was the defeat of Democratic Congressman Dan Rostenkowski in the fifth congressional district of Illinois. Rostenkowski had already served 18 terms as a Congressman, and spent close to $2.5 million on the election compared to the $133,000 spent by his Republican opponent. Nevertheless, this financing advantage of 22:1 was unable to save him from a 52–46 percent defeat. The advantage that opponent Michael Flanagan had over Rostenkowski in this case was that he wasn't involved in a 17-count federal investigation in "misuse of personal and congressional funds, extortion of gifts and cash, and obstruction of justice." The Rostenkowski example is frequently cited in claims that money does not buy elections.

While there is a correlation between money raised and winning elections, there are some who argue there may not be a direct causation: or more simply, you cannot buy an election. A different hypothesis explaining this correlation is that someone donating money to a political candidate often gives that money to whomever they believe will win. They might do this for future special considerations from the politician, or just to be on the winning team. This person, then, would never give money to a sure loser, and this way a candidate with small lead in the polls can quickly develop an insurmountable lead in campaign spending.

=== Gerrymandering ===
Gerrymandering is a widely used, and often legal, tactic in the United States. In the U.S., gerrymandering typically involves the "packing and cracking" method, but other tactics have also been used. While most incumbents have had success in having district lines drawn to their liking, few have had the opposite experience. A potential theory against gerrymandering being a significant factor in electoral stagnation can be summed up by the statement that all incumbents were elected to serve for a Congressional district before the boundaries were redrawn, and that redrawing them does not make a great difference to any potential future outcome.

=== Loss of party alignment ===
Loss of party alignment (that voters lose their strong dedication to a specific party) was one of the first theories formulated to explain the stagnating congress, and was widely accepted to be the main cause for electoral stagnation in the 1970s. This was a theory devised following a slight lapse in party alignment of the American voters, following the Watergate Scandal, however it did not weaken very much and rebounded in the 1980s. If dealignment had been one of the major contributing factors to the growth of incumbency advantage, the effects of incumbency should have declined after the 1980s, as partisanship rebounded; however, time has proven that this is not the case.

=== Advantages of incumbency ===
==== Incumbency itself ====
There are advantages that come with being an incumbent (in addition to being, for example, the representative from the majority party in the district, or having greater access to campaign finances). Being an incumbent lends both greater name recognition and attracts votes that would not be gained by a challenger or running in an open seat race. Various estimates have been made to sift through the, data and discern how many votes incumbency itself is worth, and although various methodologies have yielded varied results it has been estimated that prior to the mid-1960s incumbency added only a few percentage points to the incumbents' column.

There is wide agreement that since the mid-1960s, the advantage of incumbency has grown significantly. Estimates have indicated that it has increased to roughly 7 to 10 percentage points of the vote, depending on the methodology used. This indicates that the advantage of incumbency has close to quadrupled while competition and seat changes have sharply decreased. Districts have been made safer for incumbents and this has buffered these districts from the tides of national politics.

==== Pork barrel spending ====
"Pork barrel spending" is a term in American politics used to refer to congressmen or senators who use their position on Committees in the Senate or House to appropriate federal money to their own district or state, and therefore bring increased business and investment to their home area. This process is referred to as "bringing home the pork." This can be used to build up a stronger base of support, thereby solidifying their hold on the sensibilities of their constituents, using the job to secure its own continuation. Allocation of these funds is often achieved through attaching amendments providing the "pork" to bills that are not related to financial appropriations, and that are likely to be passed, thereby guaranteeing the allocation. Political commentator Michael J. Malbin has commented that Congress suffers from an "I'll support your pork if you support mine" syndrome and that it would be difficult to eliminate pork without fundamentally changing the way in which Congress appropriates funds. Some politicians take a hard-line stance against pork and have worked to eliminate pork from Congress.

An early-21st-century example of attempted pork barrel spending was the Gravina Island Bridge, a proposed Alaska bridge which attracted so much national attention as a "bridge to nowhere" that the earmark for it was removed.

== Proposed solutions to the increased incumbency advantage ==
=== Congressional term limits ===
Applying term limits to Congressmen was proposed in the "Citizen Legislature Act" (H.J.Res. 73) during the 104th Congress as an amendment to the Constitution that would limit Congressmen to 6 two-year terms. This act was defeated in the House by a 227–204 margin: the 227 votes in favor were insufficient, as a proposed Constitutional amendment requires a two-thirds majority of 290 votes to be passed. Since the failure of the Citizen Legislature Act to be passed, there has been no new legislation proposed advocating the imposing of term limits.

The introduction of term limits on members of Congress would prevent the electoral advantage in the long run; however, it is not certain how well it would have aided in reducing electoral advantage in House races involving an incumbent who was still eligible to run for re-election.

Term limits in the United States are not unheard of; several states have amended their own constitutions to limit terms on elected statewide officials as high as the Governor's office (most notably the Commonwealth of Virginia, which limits its governors to unlimited four-year non-sequential terms). However, on a federal level only the Office of the Presidency has term limits imposed on it (by the 22nd Amendment to the Constitution).

=== Bipartisan Campaign Reform Act ===
Prior to BCRA, the last major piece of campaign finance legislation was the Federal Election Campaign Act, which had been ratified in 1971 and amended several times, most recently in 1979.

BCRA was enacted with the pledge that it would break the stranglehold of money on the political process, make huge sums of money from limited donors the exception rather than the rule, and eliminate the corruption influence (whether real or only perceived) of such donations. From one standpoint it can be argued that the situation had already hit rock bottom in terms of stagnation, and that any reform would improve the current situation. However, there is an equally strong argument that BCRA will do very little to affect the congressional deadlock.

Having been tailored to focus on issue advocacy and big businesses, BCRA forfeited its chance to focus more on congressional stagnation. BCRA was more tailored to combat the seemingly irresistible rise of political soft money, whereas the structural problems in congressional stagnation lie elsewhere. The problems of an enlarged incumbency advantage are the results of a severe imbalance in hard money contributions to the candidates and is not a consequence of a sizable influx of soft money, or third-party issue advocacy. Given the huge advantages that incumbents have, some might say that political tools like soft money and issue advocacy would benefit the underdog challenger, as it could be potentially helpful to them, and could lessen the competition. It follows that any impediment to these alternative sources might prove to work contrary to the revitalization of the political process. BCRA can be seen as such an impediment, and this was why some opponents of BCRA had labeled it as an "incumbency protection act".

=== Congressional Apportionment Amendment ===
Another possible solution would be the ratification of the original first amendment proposed to the U.S. Constitution. The Congressional Apportionment Amendment was originally proposed as the first of twelve amendments to the Constitution, and came within one state ratification of being passed in 1789–1791, but has not been ratified by any state since.

One of the effects of this amendment, if ratified, would be to dramatically increase the size of the House of Representatives from 435 to a number determined by an algorithm within the amendment of approximately 600-6,000.

== Increased incumbency advantage as a positive development ==
Some justifications that have been proffered, namely increased experience and stability in Congress. The long-term presence of legislators allows some to become experts in overseeing some of the highly technical aspects of government programs. Also, incumbents whose re-election is virtually guaranteed can arguably focus on actually passing productive legislation rather than on campaigning.

== See also ==
- Campaign finance reform
