= List of United States Senate election disputes =

Article One of the United States Constitution gives the Senate the power to "determine the elections, returns, and qualifications" of its own members. As a result, the Senate has been asked to review the election of one of its members many times.

== Election cases ==
Year	Senator	State	Result	Details
1794	Albert Gallatin	Pennsylvania	Unseated	Gallatin was ruled to have failed to meet the minimum nine years of United States citizenship required to be a senator.
1794	Kensey Johns	Delaware	Not seated	Johns was appointed to the Senate by the Governor of Delaware while the state legislature was in session (albeit deadlocked).
1796	William Blount	Tennessee	Not seated; then later seated	Blount and Cocke were appointed to the Senate by the legislature of the Southwest Territory, which was seeking to have its statehood recognized. The Senate admitted the Southwest Territory into the Union as the State of Tennessee on June 1, and ruled that Blount and Cocke were not qualified to be senators because the body which had appointed them was not yet a state legislature. The Tennessee legislature duly reappointed Blount and Cocke, and the two were seated under that appointment on December 6.
1796	William Cocke	Tennessee	Not seated; then later seated	
1801	Uriah Tracy	Connecticut	Seated	Tracy was a Federalist whose term expired at the close of March 3, 1801. The Connecticut state legislature had not met to appoint a senator to fill Tracy's seat, so the Connecticut governor had appointed Tracy to the Senate "from the 3rd of March next until the next meeting of the legislature of said state." His credentials were questioned, but he was approved to take his seat by a vote of 13–10.
1809	Stanley Griswold	Ohio	Seated	Griswold was appointed to the Senate less than a year after he had moved to Ohio. His residency in that state was questioned. The Committee of Elections ruled that since neither the Constitution nor the laws of Ohio specified residency requirements, the certification of the governor of Ohio that Griswold was a resident was sufficient for his appointment.
1815	Jesse Bledsoe	Kentucky	Seat declared vacant	Bledsoe had sent a letter of resignation to the state government of Kentucky in December 1814. On January 20, 1815, after a successor had been named but before that successor had appeared before the Senate, Bledsoe submitted a letter to the Senate requesting to know whether he still retained the seat or if the seat had been declared vacant. The Senate then declared the seat vacant.
1825	James Lanman	Connecticut	Not seated	On March 4, 1825, the Senate met in special session. Lanman's term had expired at the close of the previous day, so he presented new credentials from Connecticut's governor, appointing Lanman to his seat until the state legislature convened in May. The credentials had been issued in late February so that they could reach Lanman by the start of the new term. The Senate ruled that the governor lacked authority to issue credentials in advance of a vacancy and so denied Lanman his seat.
1827	Ephraim Bateman	New Jersey	Retained seat	Bateman had been the chairman of the joint meeting of the New Jersey state legislature to elect a replacement for Joseph McIlvaine. With the field narrowed to two candidates, Bateman had won the election by a vote of 29–28, with Bateman providing the one vote margin. A protest was filed, claiming that Bateman's presiding over—and providing the deciding vote for—his own election was illegal and improper. The Senate ruled that New Jersey had met all constitutional directives relating to Senate elections and so Bateman was duly elected.
1834	Elisha R. Potter v. Asher Robbins	Rhode Island	Robbins retained seat	
1837	Ambrose H. Sevier	Arkansas	Seated	
1844	John M. Niles	Connecticut	Seated	
1849	James Shields	Illinois	Unseated	
1974	Louis C. Wyman	New Hampshire	Not seated	Republican Louis C. Wyman initially defeated Democrat John A. Durkin by 355 votes; however, two subsequent recounts held Durkin and Wyman to be the victor, by 10 and 2 votes respectively. After weeks of wrangling over disputed ballots, the results of the election were annulled; Durkin and Wyman agreed to run again in a special election, and the U.S. Senate declared the seat vacant. The special election was held in 1975, which John Durkin won with 54%.
2008	Roland Burris	Illinois	Seated	Governor Rod Blagojevich (D-IL) chose Roland Burris (D-IL) as the Senator-designate from Illinois to fill the seat left vacant by then President-elect Barack Obama (D-IL). Senate majority leader Harry Reid (D-NV) refused to seat Burris due to allegations that Governor Blagojevich had tried to sell the senate seat left vacant by Obama. The Secretary of the Senate and the Senate Parliamentarian deemed Burris's credentials valid, and Senate leaders seated Burris.
