= Larrabee (surname) =

Larrabee is a surname. Notable people with the surname include:

- Anna Matilda Larrabee (1842–1931), First Lady of Iowa
- Charles B. Larrabee (1926–2008), American judge from New Mexico
- Charles H. Larrabee (1820–1883), American politician and judge from Wisconsin
- C. X. Larrabee (1843–1914), American businessman and co-founder of Fairhaven, Washington
- Constance Stuart Larrabee (1914–2000), South African photographer
- Frederic Larrabee (1873–1959), American politician from Iowa
- James W. Larrabee (1839–1907), American Civil War Medal of Honor recipient
- Jessica Larrabee, member of She Keeps Bees
- Mike Larrabee (1933–2003), American sprinter and Olympic gold medalist
- Seth Larrabee (1855–1910), American politician and attorney from Maine
- Stephen Larrabee (1630–1676), English colonist, one of the first settlers in Maine
- William Larrabee (Iowa politician) (1832–1912), American politician from Iowa
