= William Larrabee =

William Larrabee may refer to:

- William Larrabee (Iowa politician) (1832–1912), Governor of Iowa, father of William Larrabee Jr.
- William Larrabee (Indiana politician) (1870–1960), Congressman from Indiana
- William Larrabee Jr. (1870–1933), Iowa state representative, son of Iowa's governor
- William C. Larrabee (1802–1859), president of Depauw University
