= Senator Larrabee =

Senator Larrabee may refer to:

- Frederic Larrabee (1873–1959), Iowa State Senate
- William Larrabee (Iowa politician) (1832–1912), Iowa State Senate
