= John D. Shaffer =

American politician (1858–1931)

John D. Shaffer (May 18, 1858 – June 27, 1931) was an American politician.

== Personal life ==
John Shaffer was born to United Brethren in Christ minister Israel and Margaret Mary Shaffer on May 18, 1858, near Dunkerton, Iowa. Shaffer had three brothers and three sisters. When John was eight years old, his family moved to West Union. He enrolled at Western College before transferring and graduating from Upper Iowa University. Shaffer married his first wife, Susan C. Robbins, on September 18, 1878. His parents subsequently moved to Arlington, leaving the family farm in Shaffer's care. In addition to raising Percherons and Shorthorns, Shaffer was also president and vice president of banks in Wadena and Elgin. Shaffer and his wife raised eight children, and moved into Elgin in 1916. After Robbins died in 1923, Shafer married Arvilla Cave the following year. Shaffer died in Elgin on June 27, 1931, aged 73.

== Political career ==
Politically, Shaffer was affiliated with the Republican Party. He served as the township clerk, and was a member of the Fayette County Board of Supervisors for six years prior to his election to the Iowa House of Representatives in 1903. Shaffer succeeded William Larrabee Jr. in District 71 for three consecutive terms until 1909, when Larrabee returned to office.
