= Larrabee =

Larrabee may refer to:

== Places in the United States ==
- Larrabee, California, a former name of Larabee
- Larrabee County, Iowa, a historic proposed county
- Larrabee, Iowa, a city
- Larrabee, Wisconsin, a town in Waupaca County
- Larrabee (community), Wisconsin, an unincorporated community in Manitowoc County
- Larrabee State Park, Washington, a park

== Other uses ==
- Larrabee (surname)
- Larrabee (microarchitecture), a former codename for an Intel microarchitecture

== See also ==
- Larrabees, New Jersey, a community
- Larabee (disambiguation)
- Larabie (disambiguation)
