= Union Sunday School (Clermont, Iowa) =

- U.S. National Register of Historic Places
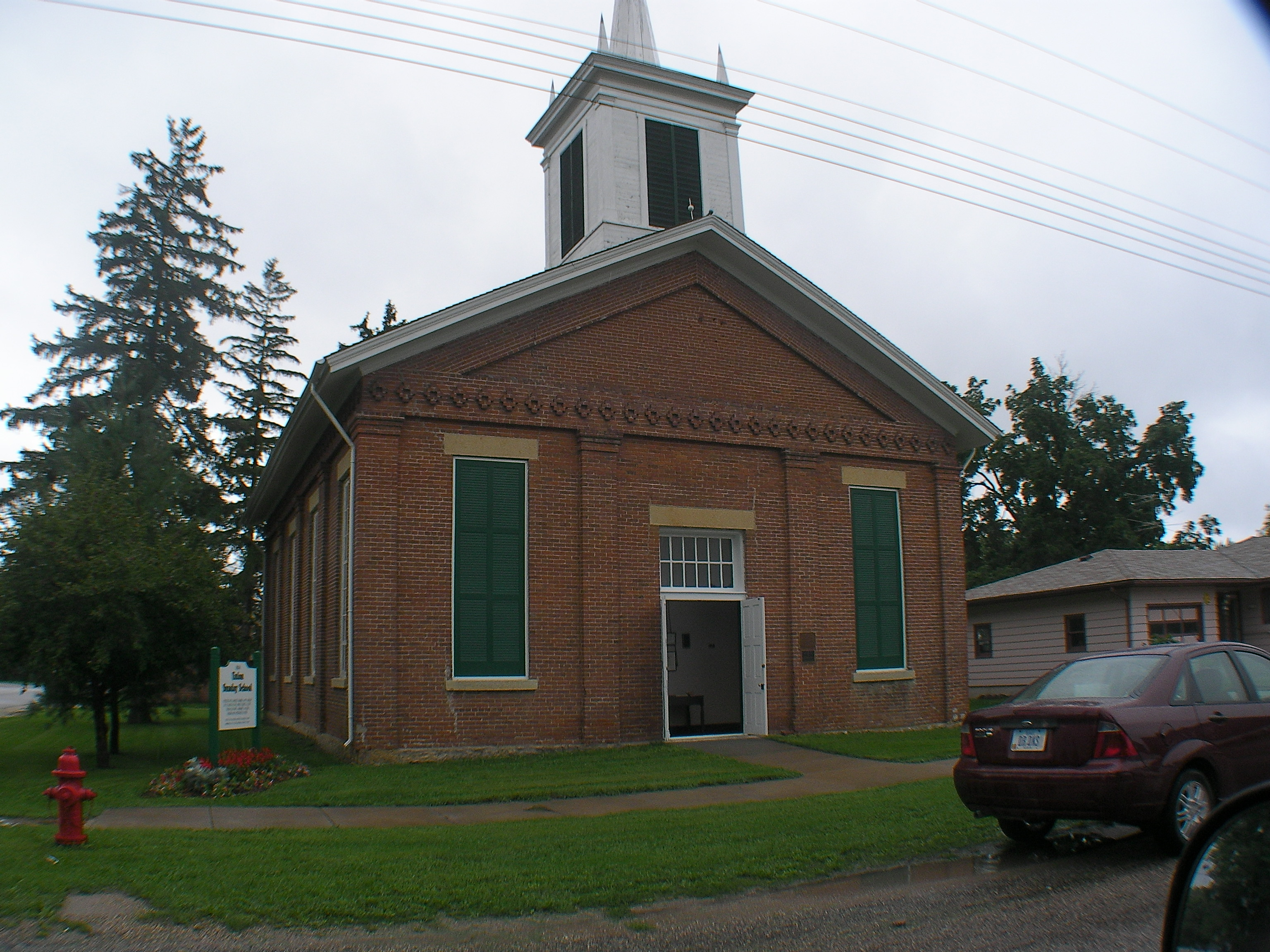

- Location within Iowa Location within the United States
- Location: McGregor and Larrabee Sts., Clermont, Iowa
- Coordinates: 43°0′10″N 91°39′25″W
- Area: less than one acre
- Built: 1858
- NRHP reference No.: 74000785
- Added to NRHP: November 5, 1974

Union Sunday School is an historic building located in Clermont, Iowa, United States. It was built in 1858 and listed on the National Register of Historic Places in 1974.

== History ==
Initially, the building housed Clermont Presbyterian Church, which disbanded shortly afterward. In 1863, the Presbytery and the Union Sunday School entered into an agreement whereby the latter could use the building as long as they were able to maintain it. Organized in 1857, Union was a non-denominational Sunday school for adults and children. Previously they had met in the home of Mrs. Edwin Stedman, the first of seven superintendents. The most prominent member of the Sunday school was William Larrabee, who spent 18 years in the Iowa Senate, and served two terms as Iowa's governor. He provided the pneumatic Kimball organ in 1896. His daughter Anna served as the church organist for over 60 years. The instrument, restored by Dobson Pipe Organ Builders in 2010, is still played in concerts. The Sunday school was known throughout the years for its Christmas program.

From 1877, the building also housed Clermont's first lending library. The books were donated by the Larrabee family. A group of people in town wanted to start Protestant services, and beginning in 1933 the Rev. J.J. Snyder of Elgin, Iowa served as the first minister of what was known as the Union Church. In 1943 the congregation became Methodists. Union Sunday School dwindled in size and disbanded in 1963. At that time it was the oldest organization in continuous operation in Clermont. The Methodist congregation disbanded in 1966. The Presbytery of Northeast Iowa donated the building to the non-profit Historical Governor Larrabee Home in 1970.

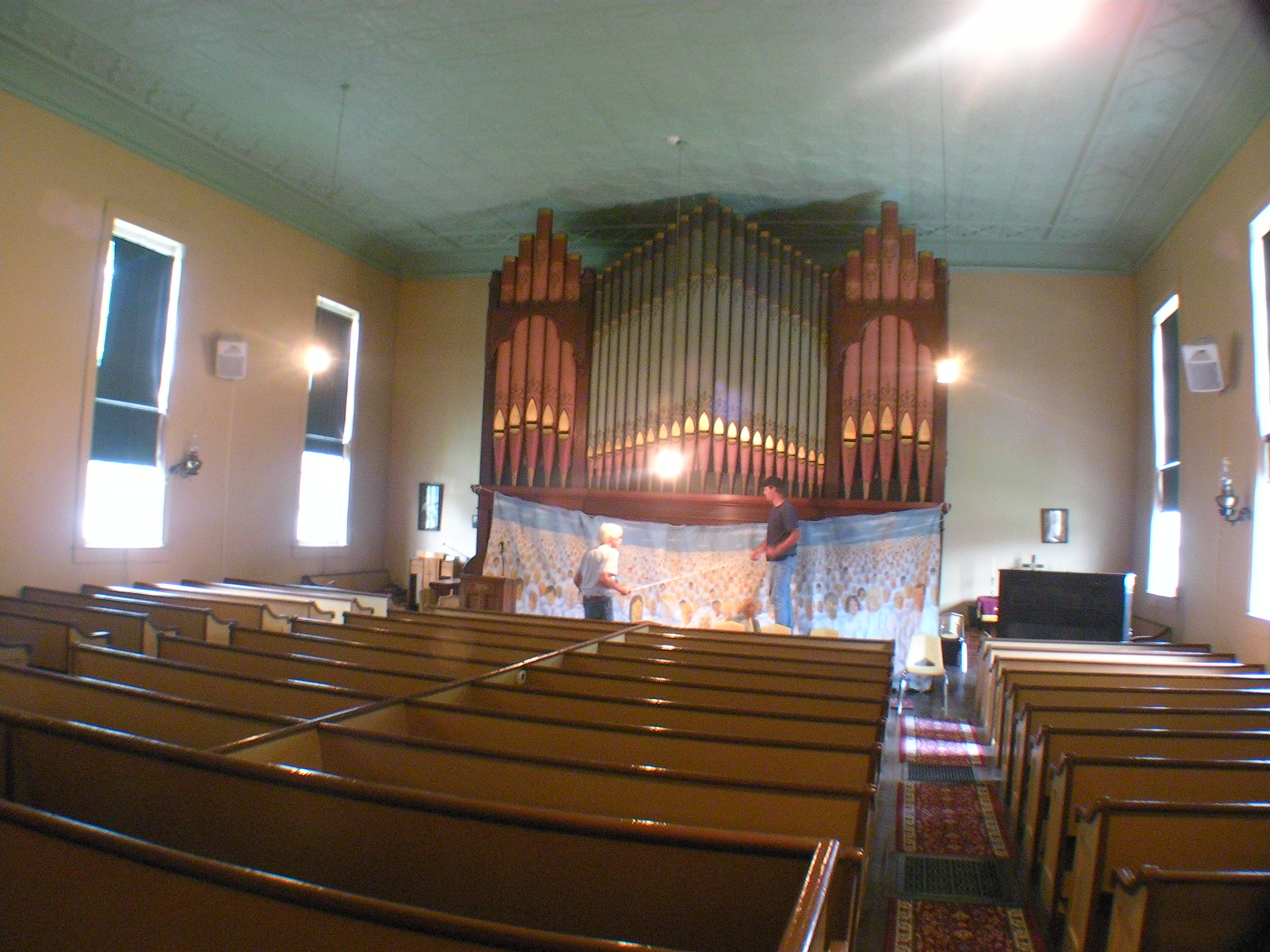
Chapel

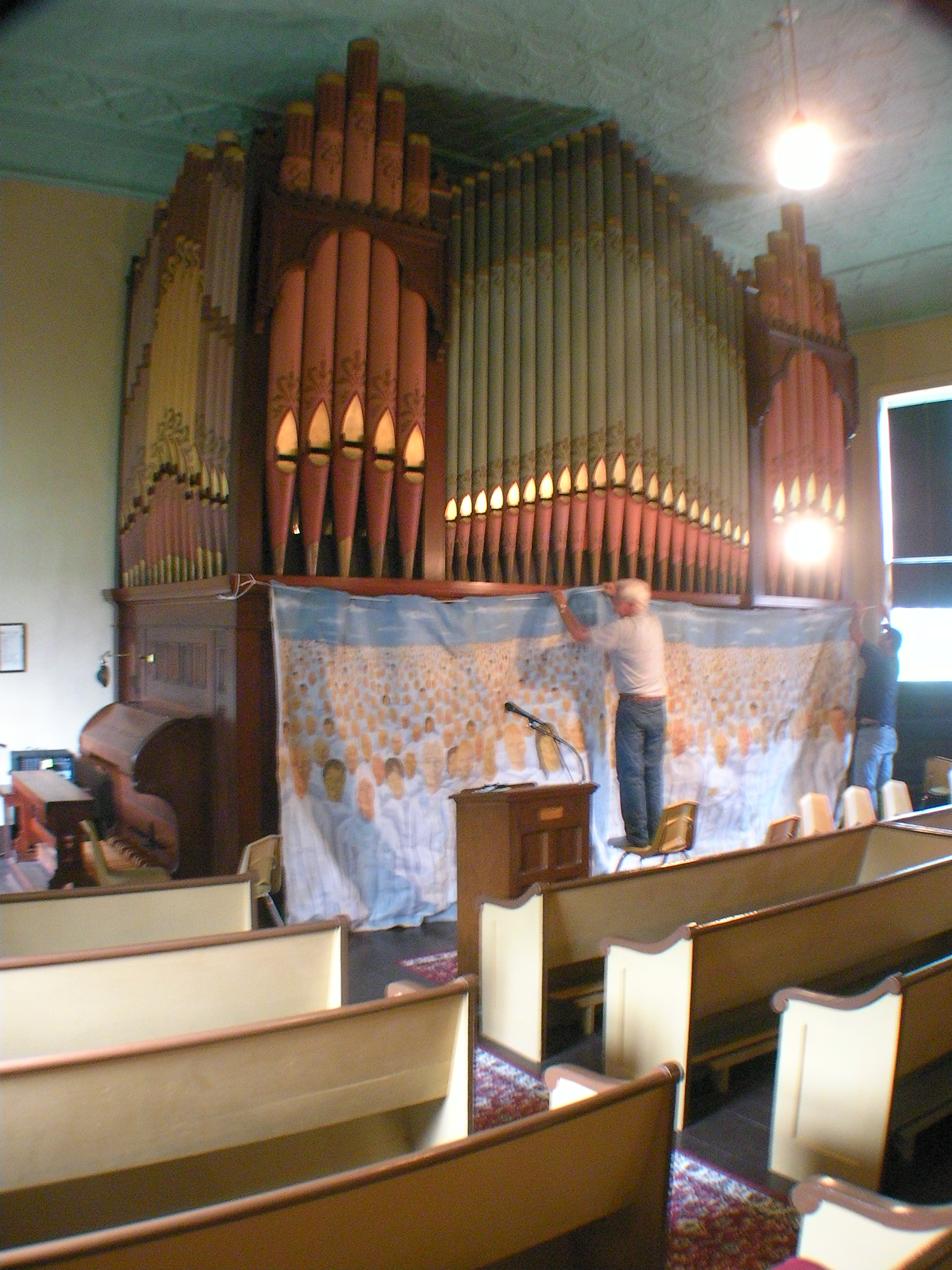
Kimball Organ

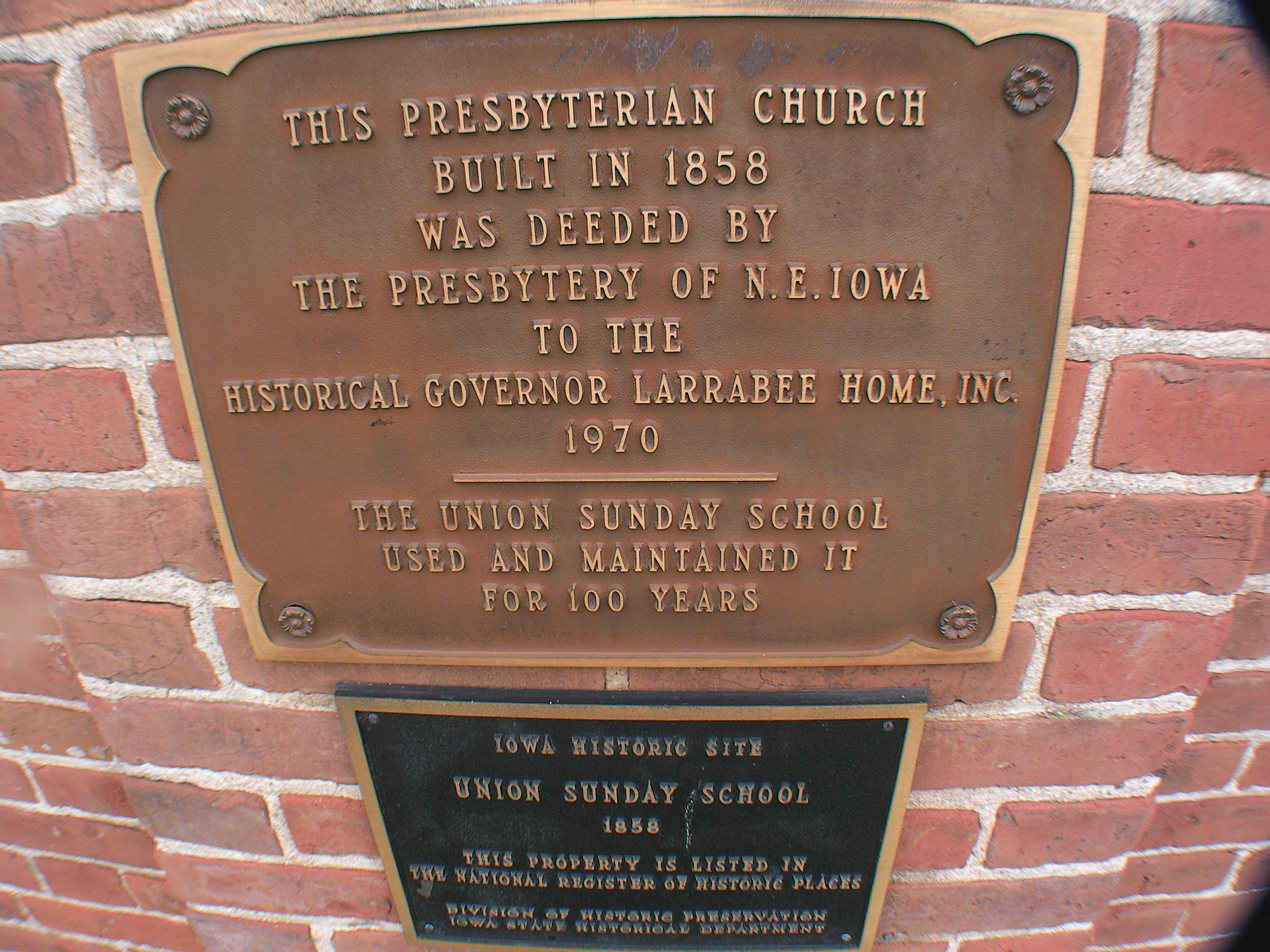
Plaques

== Architecture ==
The brick structure measures 57 by 41 feet (17 by 12 m). Its main facade features the suggestion of a pediment formed by the decorative brick frieze and the simple brick coping. Extending below it are four capped brick pilasters. The windows are all rectangular in shape and they each have locally quarried dolomite lintels and sills. The front windows have louvered shutters. Above the front gable is a large square wooden bell tower. Its corners feature capped pilasters that frame the double louvered panels of the bell chamber. It is capped with a metal spire with a brass ornamental cross.

The interior has three sections of pews across with no middle aisle. The pipe organ is centered on the back wall. The ceiling is composed of ornamental pressed tin. The vestibule was divided to provide for the library and an entry area. The drop lights were added in 1910 when electricity was added to the building.

== Notable people ==
- Anna Matilda Larrabee, superintendent of the Union Sunday School for more than 30 years}
