= Valley Community School District =

Defunct school district in Iowa, United States

Valley Community School District was a school district headquartered in Elgin, Iowa. The district was located in sections of Fayette and Clayton counties, and served Elgin, Clermont, and Wadena.

== History ==
The Valley district and the North Fayette Community School District began a grade-sharing arrangement, in which students of one school district attend another district's schools, in fall 2013. The two districts together had one middle school and one high school.

The merger vote for North Fayette and Valley was scheduled for Tuesday February 7, 2017. The North Fayette district residents voted in favor of the merger on a 504–17, or 97% in favor, while the Valley residents voted in favor on a 326-30 basis, or 92% in favor. On July 1, 2018, it merged into the North Fayette district to form the North Fayette Valley Community School District.

== Schools ==
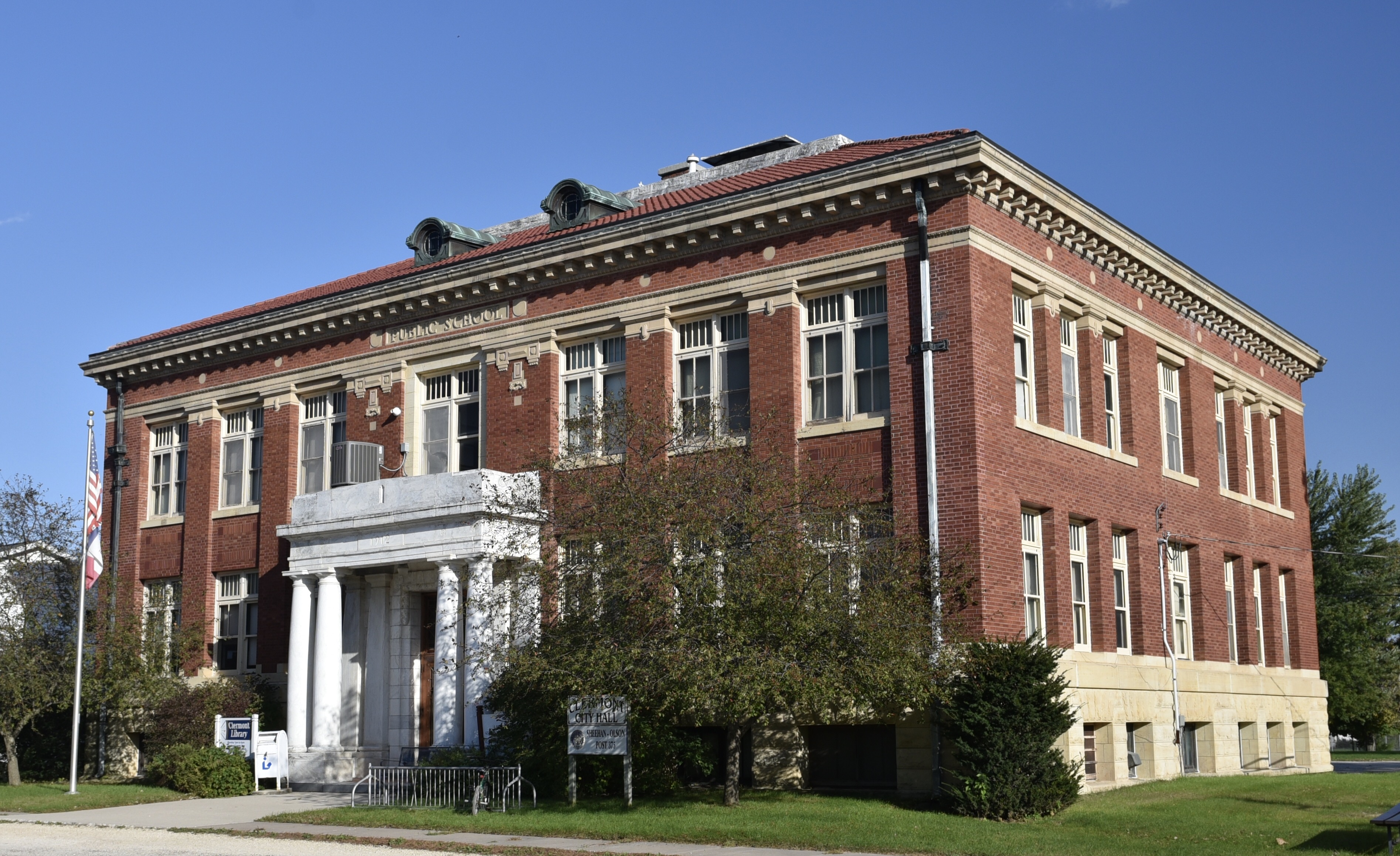
The former Clermont Public School

Clermont previously had a school building, Clermont Public School, built circa 1913, which closed in 1990. Now named the Larrabee Building, it houses administrative offices of the city government and a library. Jason Clayworth and Charles Litchfield of the Des Moines Register described it as "richly decorated in marble".
