= Larabee =

Larabee may refer to:

- Larabee, California, United States
- Larabee, Louisiana, United States
- Agent Larabee, a character in the TV show Get Smart played by Robert Karvelas

== See also ==
- Larrabee (disambiguation)
- Larabie (disambiguation)
