= Anna Matilda Larrabee =

American social leader (1842–1931)

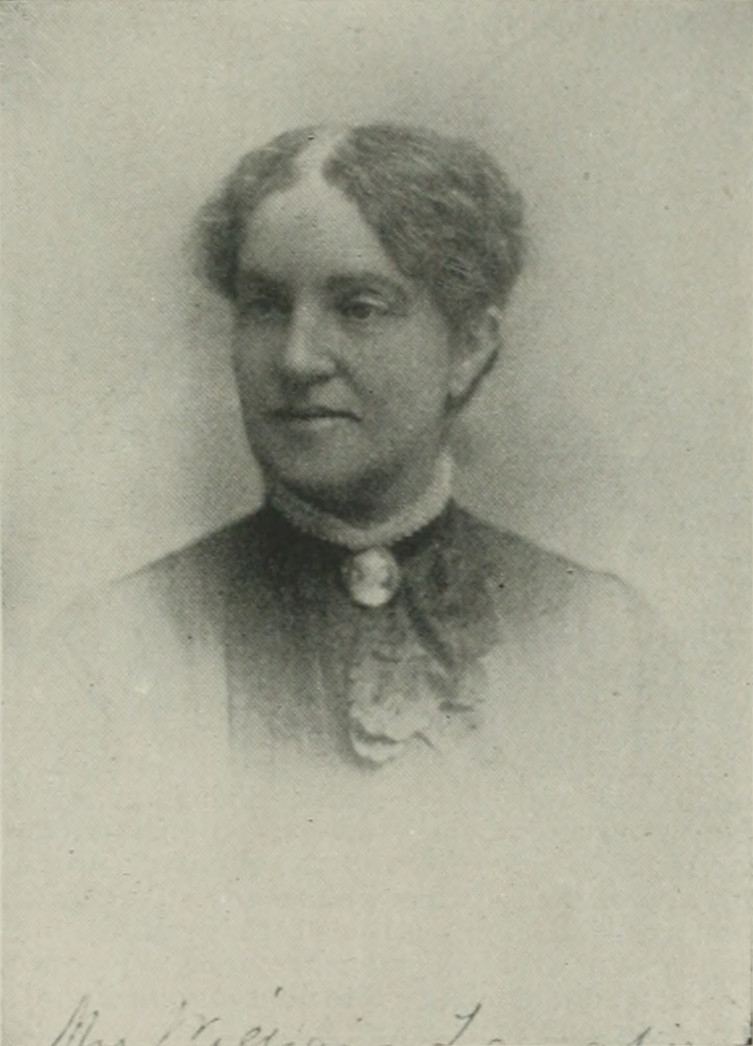
- "A Woman of the Century"

First Lady of Iowa
- In role January 14, 1886 – February 27, 1890
- Governor: William Larrabee
- Preceded by: Lena Kendall
- Succeeded by: Anna Brock Jackson (1894)

Personal details
- Born: Anna Matilda Appelman; August 13, 1842 Ledyard, Connecticut, U.S.
- Died: December 30, 1931 (aged 89) Clermont, Iowa, U.S.
- Party: Republican
- Spouse: William Larrabee (m. 1861; died 1912)
- Children: 7; including William Jr. and Frederic

Anna Matilda Larrabee (née, Appelman; August 13, 1842 – December 30, 1931) was an American social leader. Married to Iowa Governor William Larrabee, she served as the First Lady of Iowa from 1886 until 1890. She was often referred to as "Iowa's Ideal Mother".

== Early life and education ==
Anna Matilda Appelman was born in Ledyard, Connecticut, August 13, 1842. (Note: According to The Gazette (12 September 1911; 9 June 1917), Anna Matilda Appelman was born in Mystic, Connecticut.) She was the oldest child of Gustavus Adolphus Appelman (1817-1893) and Prudence Anna Appelman (1821-1880). She was a direct descendant of John and Priscilla Alden. Her father's family was of German lineage. Her grandfather, John Frederick Appclman, was the son of a Lutheran minister stationed in Wolgast, near the city of Stettin. He arrived in the United States in 1805, and shortly afterward took up his residence in Mystic, Connecticut, engaging in the fishing business and ship-rigging. His son, Gustavus, early followed the sea, and was, while still a very young man, placed in command of a whaler, upon which he made a number of long and very successful voyages. Mrs. Appelman, the mother of Mrs. Larrabee, was the daughter of Erastus and Nancy Williams, of Ledyard, Connecticut. Mr. Williams was in succession judge of New London County, Connecticut and member of both houses of the Legislature in his native State. Captain Appelman, tired of a sailor's life, in 1854, abandoned the sea and removed with his family westward to engage in farming.

They spent a few months at Garnavillo, Iowa before moving to Grand Meadow before settling on a farm near the village of Clermont, Iowa. Anna's siblings were John, Noyes, Hannah, Erastus, Lucy, Elias, Franz, and Lydia.

Larrabee began the study of music at the age of nine. She owned a beautiful little rosewood melodeon. Larrabee attended Clermont's country school, with home tuition supplementing the curriculum of the village school. At the age of fourteen, Anna was sent East to enter the academy in Mystic, Connecticut. She remained in that institution for two years, pursuing her studies with unusual vigor.

== Career ==
After her return to Clermont, she was placed in charge of the village school, which had an enrollment of over seventy pupils, from beginners to children of high school age, but the young teacher proved equal to her task. Her home was about a mile from the village, and she followed the paths -the old Native American trails- to and from the village each day. Larrabee received US$25 per month for her services as a school teacher. She taught all grades.

With the earnings from her job, she bought her wedding outfit. On September 12, 1861, she married William Larrabee. who later became the 13th Governor of the State of Iowa. Mrs. Larrabee was the constant companion of her husband, accompanying him in his travels and political campaigns. Mr. Larrabee was elected to the Iowa state senate in 1867 and occupied the position continuously for 17 years, and almost the entire time as chair of the ways and means committee. He resigned when nominated for governor. He was elected governor in 1885 and re-elected in 1887.

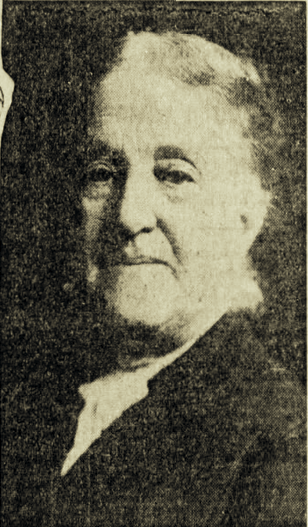
(1905)

On January 27, 1892, Governor Horace Boies appointed the Iowa Woman's Auxiliary to the American Red Cross, the use of the name having been sanctioned by Clara Barton; Mrs. Larrabee was designated as president.

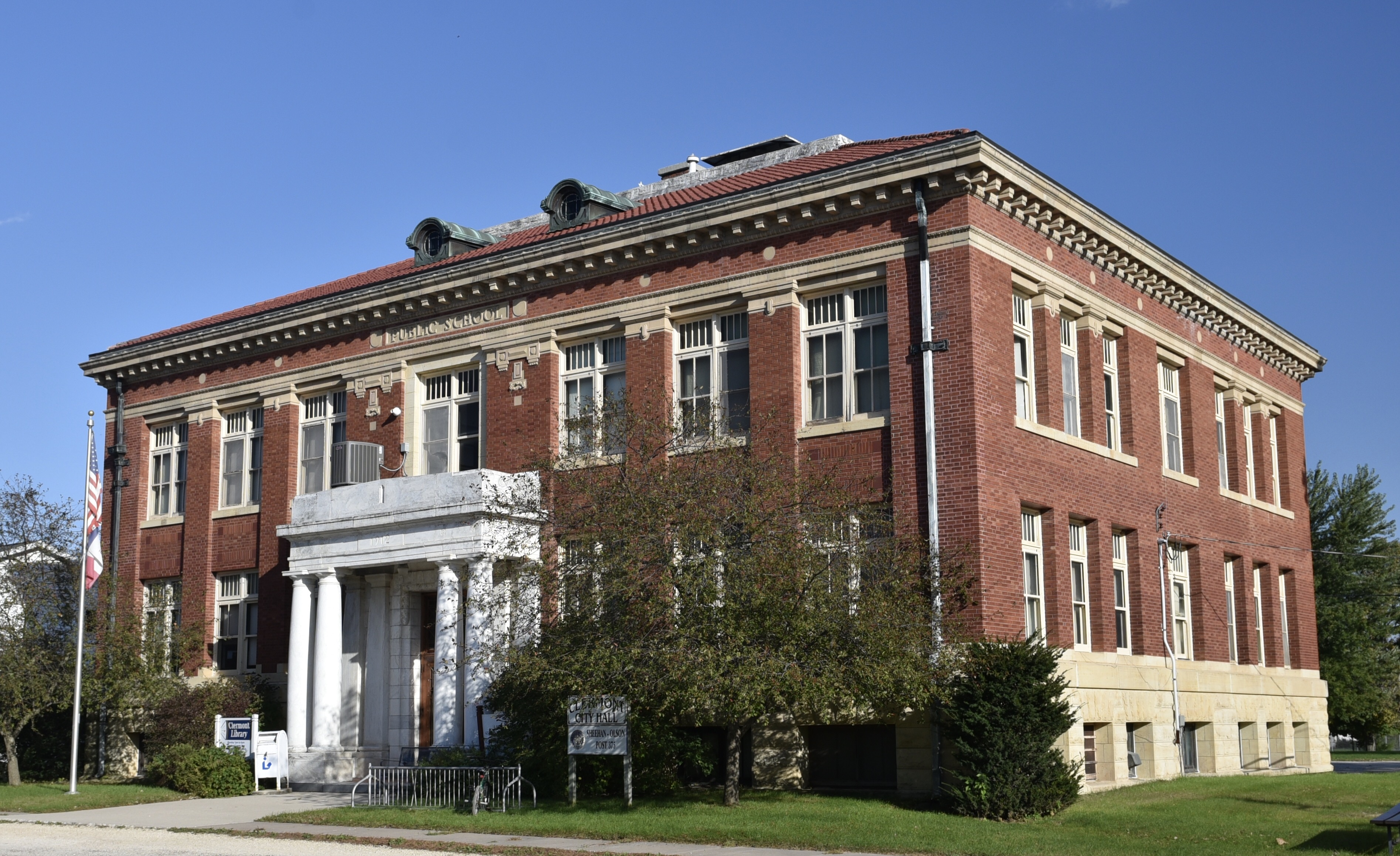
Larrabee School

One of the finest contributions that Gov. and Mrs. Larrabee made to Clermont was the Larrabee School building erected in 1912, at a cost of US$100,000. Previous to the beginning of this building, Mrs. Larrabee made a scientific study of school needs. She visited schools in the east and west of the United States, in Mexico, and in many European countries. The building was only partly done when Gov. Larrabee died, but Mrs. Larrabee went on with the work. One of its features was a museum containing rare and valuable articles. There were also busts of Gov. and Mrs. Larrabee, William Tecumseh Sherman and Ulysses S. Grant , paintings, petrified rocks, petrified tree trunks, and a spinning wheel.

In 1917, Larrabee attended the biennial of the Iowa Federation of Women's Clubs at Fort Dodge, Iowa.

A Prohibitionist and temperance movement activist, she was affiliated with the Woman's Christian Temperance Union. She was also a member of the Daughters of the American Revolution, and the Mayflower Society.

Larrabee opposed woman's suffrage.

== Personal life ==
The Larrabees had seven children: Charles, Augusta, Julia, Anna, William Jr., Frederic, and Helen. Julia married Don Lathrop Love, future Republican mayor of Lincoln, Nebraska. Helen married Charles Burton Robbins, a future United States Assistant Secretary of War.

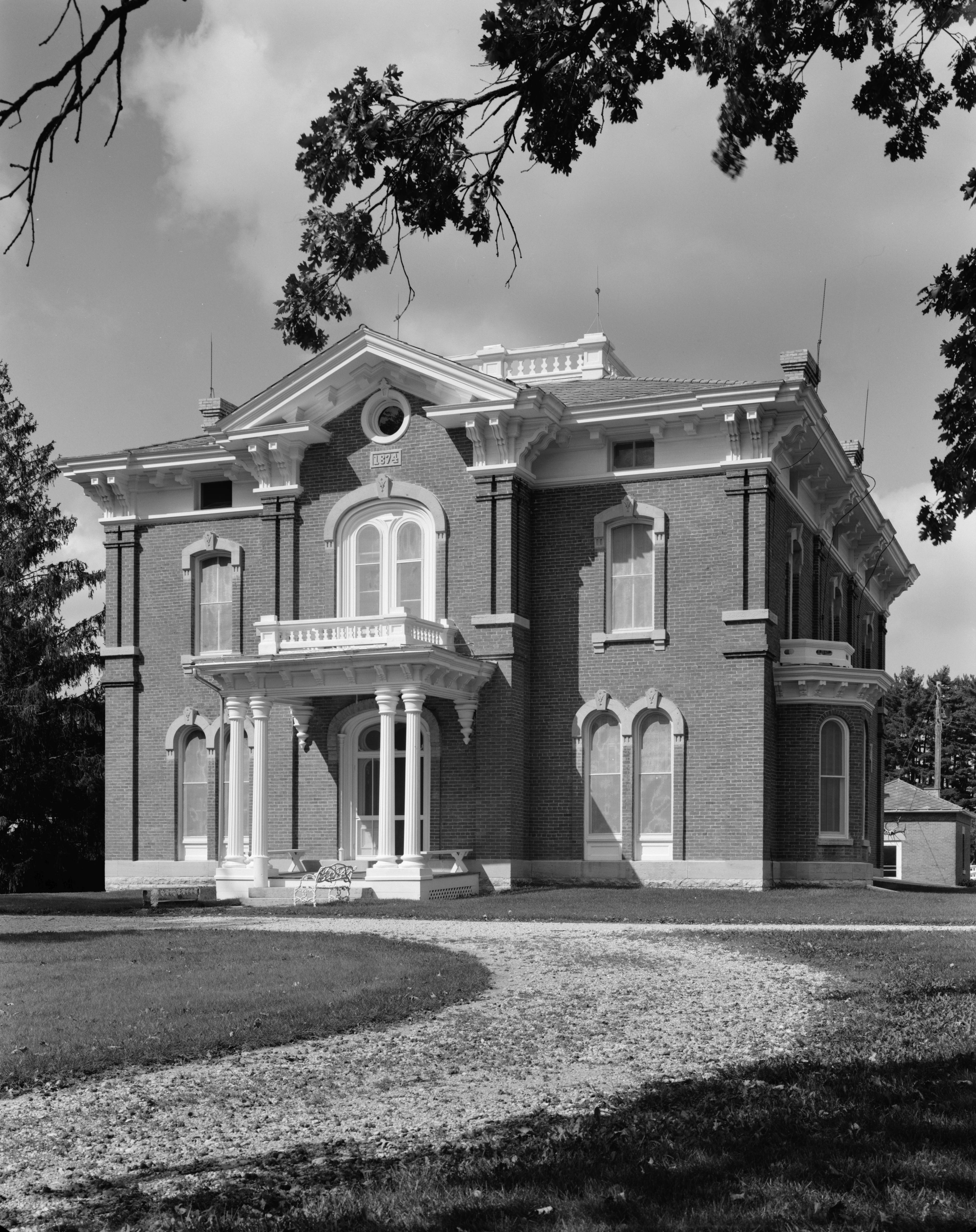
"Montauk"

Her home since her marriage, was continually in Clermont, except for the years when she lived in the Iowa Governor's Mansion. Mrs. Larrabee named the family home in Clermont "Montauk" after the Montauk Point Light which, when returning from a voyage, was the first point that her sea captain father would see on the east end of Long Island. The couple hoped to be a light and help to all people in this vicinity. "Montauk" means a place of worship.

Larrabee lived in an elite social class and raised her family in that manner. She was deeply religious in her nature. She served as Clerk of Vestry, in Clermont's Episcopal Church of the Saviour, and as superintendent of the Union Sunday School for more than 30 years.

Her hobby was hunting geological specimens.

== Death and legacy ==
Anna Matilda Larrabee died at her home, Montauk, in Clermont, Iowa, December 30, 1931. Montauk was listed on the National Register of Historic Places in 1973.
