= John Shaffer =

John Shaffer may refer to:

- John Shaffer (baseball) (1864–1926), American baseball player
- John Shaffer (governor) (1827–1870), American politician in the Utah Territory
- John B. Shaffer III (born 1968), American rapper, known as Candyman
- John D. Shaffer (1858–1931), American politician in Iowa
- John H. Shaffer (1919–1997), American administrator of the Federal Aviation Administration
