= Clermont Public School =

Historic building in Clermont, Iowa, US

- U.S. National Register of Historic Places
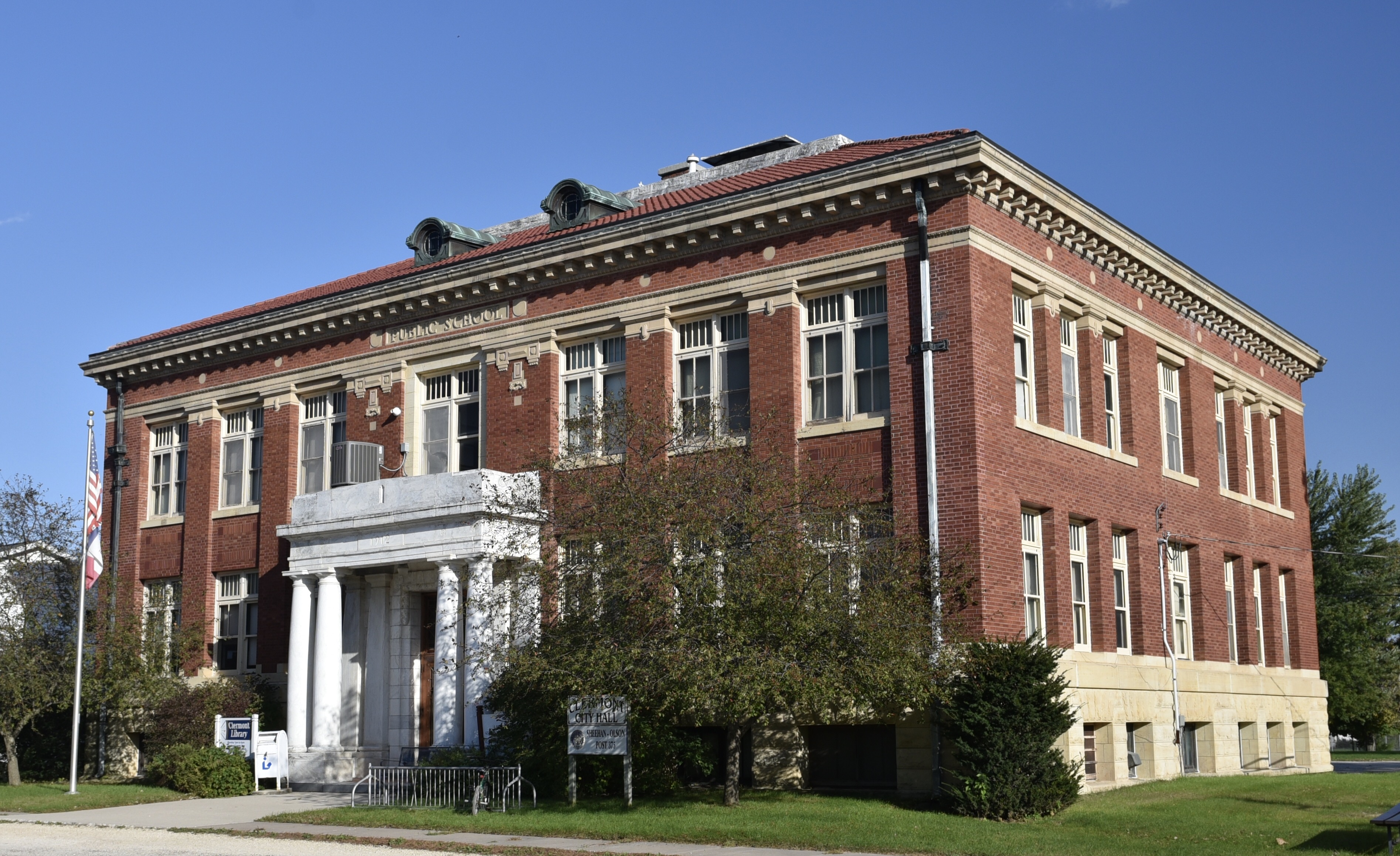

- Location within Iowa Location within the United States
- Location: 505 Larrabee St. Clermont, Iowa
- Coordinates: 43°0′03.7″N 91°39′11.6″W
- Area: 5 acres (2.0 ha)
- Built: 1912-1913
- Built by: R. A. Wallace
- Architect: Charles A. Dieman
- Architectural style: Classical Revival
- NRHP reference No.: 95001316
- Added to NRHP: November 22, 1995

Clermont Public School, also known as Larrabee School, is a historic building located in Clermont, Iowa, United States. The school was named for its patron, William Larrabee, who was the twelfth Governor of Iowa. Larrabee himself had been a teacher in Allamakee County, Iowa. During his time in the Iowa Senate and as governor he championed education reform. He used as one of his campaign slogans: "A schoolhouse on every hill and no saloons in the valley." Larrabee and his wife Anna studied school buildings for a number of years, and were involved in planning this building. They hired Cedar Rapids, Iowa architect Charles A. Dieman to design the structure. R. A. Wallace, a contractor from Cedar Rapids, was responsible for its construction. The building was over-engineered as Larrabee insisted that the strength of everything be doubled. The bricks were produced, and the limestone was quarried, locally. It is a two-story Neoclassical building that features a classical portico, brick pilasters with Doric capitals, and two arched dormers on the hipped roof.

Larrabee died while the building was under construction, and his wife, Anna Matilda Larrabee, took over supervising its construction. From 1913 to 1924, it housed all grades until a high school was built. It remained as an elementary school until 1990 when the city of Clermont acquired the building for use as a public library and city hall. It was listed on the National Register of Historic Places in 1995.
