= Episcopal Church of the Saviour (Clermont, Iowa) =

- Church of the Saviour Episcopal Church and David Henderson Statue
- U.S. National Register of Historic Places
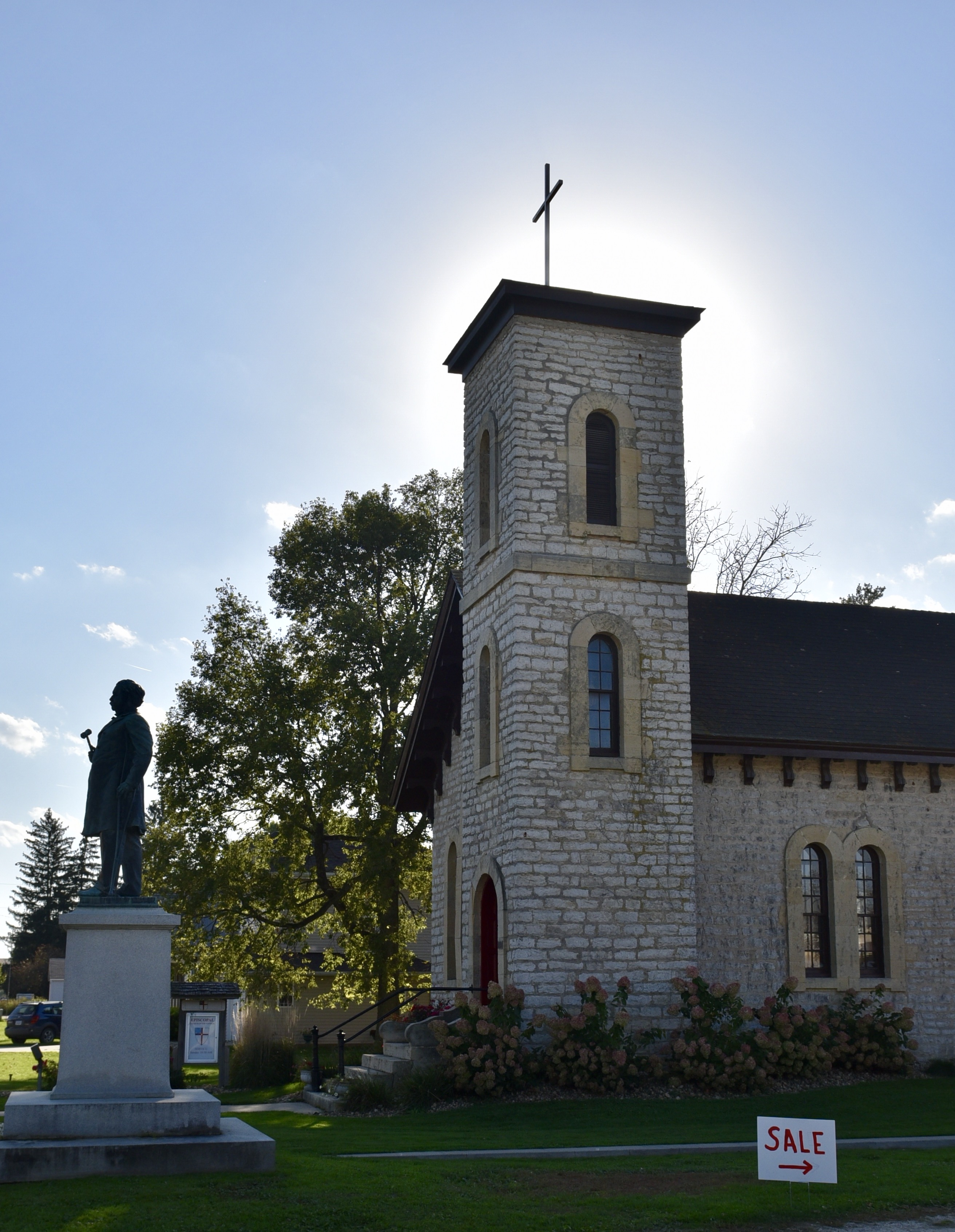

- Location within Iowa Location within the United States
- Location: Junction of Mill and Thompson, Clermont, Iowa
- Coordinates: 43°0′10″N 91°39′14″W
- Built: 1867
- Architect: John Massey Rhind
- Architectural style: Romanesque
- NRHP reference No.: 00001196
- Added to NRHP: October 30, 2000

The Episcopal Church of the Saviour, also known as Memorial Episcopal Church, is a parish church in the Episcopal Diocese of Iowa. The church is located in Clermont, Iowa, United States. The church building, along with the statue of David Henderson, was listed on the National Register of Historic Places in 2000.

In 2023, the church reported 22 members. No membership statistics were reported in 2024 national parochial reports.

== Church of the Saviour ==
The parish was established as the Free Episcopal Mission Church in 1866. The church was built ten years later and it was consecrated by Bishop Henry Washington Lee on December 16, 1870. It is one of three Episcopal churches that were built as a memorial to the two children of Frances Dyer Vinton of Providence, Rhode Island. The other two churches were built in Providence, and in San Gabriel, California. She had been inspired by the Biblical passage "Thy praise shall ring from shore to shore," to build a church in the east, west, and in middle of the country. They were all named "Church of the Saviour." Clermont was chosen because of Vinton's association with Dr. William Lewis who was serving as a captain in the Union Army during the Civil War when they met. The Lewis home was bequeathed to the church for use as a rectory. The church in Providence closed in 1950 and has been torn down and the church in San Gabriel has been significantly altered over the years.

=== Architecture ===
The church building was built of Iowa limestone that was quarried from the Williams Quarry east of Clermont. The architect is unknown, but the stone masonry reflects the work of a master builder. It is a combination of the Romanesque and Italian Villa styles that reflect the romantic and picturesque qualities of mid-19th century architecture. The church building features a three-story tower, bracted eaves, and attached round arch windows. In 1930 a slate roof replaced the cedar shingles that had been put on in 1903. The interior features a barrel-vaulted ceiling, beaded wainscoting, and varnished hardwood pews. The altar and cross were given to the church from the Trinity Church Guild of Middletown, Connecticut. It was given in recognition of the work of Mrs. William Larrabee, Jr., a daughter-in-law of former governor of Iowa William Larrabee.

== David Henderson Statue ==
David B. Henderson was a member of the U.S. House of Representatives from 1882 to 1902. He represented the people of Iowa's 3rd congressional district. From 1899 to 1903 he served as Speaker of the U.S. House of Representatives. Congressman Henderson was the first Speaker of the House west of the Mississippi. Iowa Governor William Larrabee had the statue made and presented to the city of Clermont in his honor. It was designed by New York City sculpture John Massey Rhind, and cast by the Henry Bonnard Bronze Company of New York. The bronze statue stands 7.5 feet (2.3 m) tall on its original granite pedestal. The statue was initially located in the center of Mill Street, and it was dedicated June 19–20, 1903 during a reunion of the 12th Iowa Volunteer Infantry Regiment to which Henderson had belonged. The statue was relocated to the church yard in 1937, which compromises its historical integrity. However, it remains an important work of art by a significant 19th-century Scottish-American artist.
