= Montauk (Clermont, Iowa) =

Historic house in Iowa, United States

- U.S. National Register of Historic Places
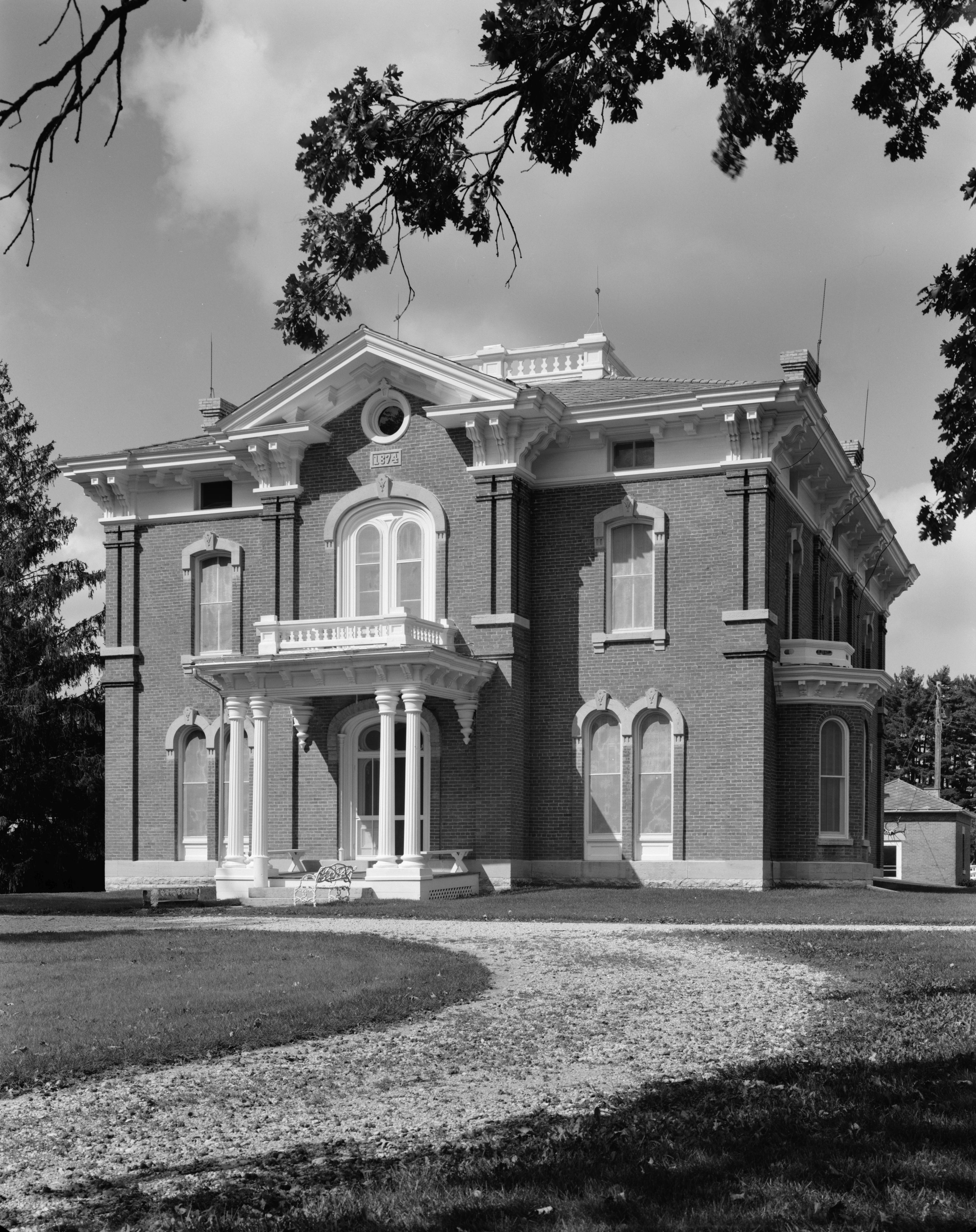

- Location within Iowa Location within the United States
- Interactive map showing the location of Montauk
- Location: 1 mile northeast of Clermont on U.S. Route 18
- Coordinates: 43°0′30.1″N 91°38′55.6″W
- Built: 1874
- Architect: E. Townsend Mix
- Architectural style: Italianate
- NRHP reference No.: 73000725
- Added to NRHP: February 21, 1973

Montauk, also known as Montauk State Preserve, is a historic house located northeast of Clermont, Iowa, United States. It was listed on the National Register of Historic Places in 1973.

== William Larrabee ==
William Larrabee, who had the house built in 1874, was a Connecticut native who made his fortune as a banker, manufacturer and land owner. As a Republican he served for 18 years in the Iowa Senate and then two terms as the Governor of Iowa. While he was one of Iowa's wealthiest landowners in his day, he helped to change Iowa politics and make government more responsive to the needs of its citizens. During his political career he led a crusade against the uncontrolled rate abuses by the railroads, which in part, led to the creation of the Interstate Commerce Commission. After his second term he retired here to Montauk. He held a couple minor roles in his later years as the chairman of the Iowa State Board of Control, and as the President of the Iowa Commission of the Louisiana Purchase Exposition in St. Louis. He was a friend of Theodore Roosevelt, and helped to establish the Progressive Party.

== Montauk ==
Initially the Larrabee's lived closer to the Turkey River, but fearing illnesses such as malaria his wife Anna Matilda Appelman desired a house on the hill. The two-story, 14 room, Italianate mansion was designed by Milwaukee architect E. Townsend Mix. The bricks for its construction were kilned at Clermont, and the stone was quarried at the Williams Quarry from nearby Clermont. The porches and the widow's walk that caps the hip roof are composed of wood. The house was named after Montauk Point Light as an homage to Mrs. Larrabee's seafaring family.

Montauk was a working farm with a caretaker's house, water tower, well house, laundry, creamery, workshop, barn, corncribs, sheds, vegetable garden, orchard. They raised peacocks, turkeys, chickens, and cattle.

The house contains many works of art from artists such as Louise Élisabeth Vigée Le Brun, William Bradford, and Pieter de Molijn. Iowa artist David John Cue painted the family's portraits. The yard has four bronze statues of Generals Ulysses S. Grant, William Tecumseh Sherman and Grenville M. Dodge and Admiral David Farragut. They were commissioned by Larrabee and created by George Edwin Bissell and J. Massey Rhind.

After Larrabee's death in 1912 the house remained in the family. His daughter Anna was the last member of the family to live here, and she maintained it until her death in 1965. The family opened the house to the public in 1967. They maintained ownership until 1976 when they deeded the house, its contents and 40 acres (16 ha) of land to the state of Iowa. The State Historical Society of Iowa preserves the property. It was dedicated as a state preserve in 1984.
