= North Fayette Valley Community School District =

Public school district in West Union, Iowa, United States

Coordinates: 42.968396°N 91.801227°W

Location
- West Union, Iowa Fayette and Clayton counties United States
- Coordinates: 42.968396, -91.801227

District information
- Type: Local school district
- Grades: K-12
- Established: 2018
- Superintendent: Joe Griffith
- Schools: 5
- Budget: $17,900,000 (2020-21)
- NCES District ID: 1900006

Students and staff
- Students: 1107 (2022-23)
- Teachers: 81.77 FTE
- Staff: 94.70 FTE
- Student–teacher ratio: 13.54
- Athletic conference: Upper Iowa
- District mascot: Tigerhawks
- Colors: Light Blue, Silver, and Black

Other information
- Website: www.nfvschools.com

North Fayette Valley Community School District is a rural public school district headquartered in West Union, Iowa.

The district is located in sections of Fayette and Clayton counties, and serves West Union, Clermont, Elgin, Fayette, Hawkeye, and Wadena.

Elementary schools are located in Elgin and West Union; the middle school is located in Elgin and the high school is located in West Union. The mascot is the Tigerhawks, and the colors are light blue, silver and black.

It formed on July 1, 2018, as a merger of the North Fayette Community School District and the Valley Community School District. The two schools previously had a grade sharing agreement since the 2013-14 school year.

== Schools ==
The district operates five schools:

- Fayette Elementary School, Fayette (Closed June 30, 2023)
- Valley Elementary School, Elgin
- West Union Elementary School, West Union
- North Fayette Valley Middle School, Elgin
- North Fayette Valley High School, West Union

=== North Fayette Valley High School ===
==== Athletics ====
The Tigerhawks compete in the Upper Iowa Conference in the following sports:

- Cross Country
- Volleyball
- Football
  - 2014 Class 2A State Champions
- Basketball
- Wrestling
- Track and Field
- Golf
- Baseball
- Softball
- Bowling
- Soccer
  - 2024 Class 1A State Champions

== See also ==
- List of school districts in Iowa
- List of high schools in Iowa
