= Larabie =

Larabie may refer to:

- Ray Larabie (born 1970), computer font designer

== See also ==
- Larrabee (disambiguation)
- Larabee (disambiguation)
