= Hanford MacNider =

United States Army general and politician (1889–1968)

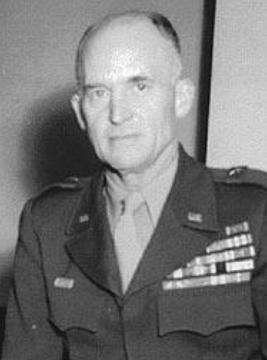
- MacNider in uniform, ca. 1945

United States Ambassador to Canada
- In office August 29, 1930 – August 15, 1932
- President: Herbert Hoover
- Preceded by: William Phillips
- Succeeded by: Warren Delano Robbins

United States Assistant Secretary of War
- In office October 16, 1925 – January 4, 1928
- President: Calvin Coolidge
- Preceded by: Dwight F. Davis
- Succeeded by: Charles Burton Robbins

4th National Commander of the American Legion
- In office 1921–1922
- Preceded by: John Emery
- Succeeded by: Alvin M. Owsley

Personal details
- Born: 2 October 1889 Mason City, Iowa, U.S.
- Died: 18 February 1968 (aged 78) Sarasota, Florida, U.S.
- Party: Republican
- Education: Harvard University (BA)

Military service
- Allegiance: United States
- Branch/service: United States Army
- Years of service: 1916–1951
- Rank: Lieutenant General
- Unit: Infantry Branch
- Commands: 103rd Infantry Division; 158th Infantry Regiment; 349th Infantry Regiment
- Battles/wars: Pancho Villa Expedition; World War I; World War II
- Awards: Distinguished Service Cross (3); Distinguished Service Medal; Silver Star (3); Legion of Merit (2); Bronze Star (2); Air Medal; Purple Heart (2); French Legion of Honor; French Croix de Guerre; Italian Cross of War Merit; Philippine Legion of Honor; See more

Hanford MacNider (2 October 1889 – 18 February 1968) was a senior officer of the United States Army who fought in both world wars. He also served as a diplomat, the Assistant Secretary of War of the United States from 1925 to 1928 and the National Commander of the American Legion from 1921 to 1922. He was also the United States Ambassador to Canada.

== Early life ==
Hanford MacNider was born in Mason City, Iowa as the son of Charles H. MacNider, a prominent banker, and May Hanford. He attended Milton Academy (a boarding school in Massachusetts) and subsequently Harvard University, where he graduated in 1911 before returning to Iowa.

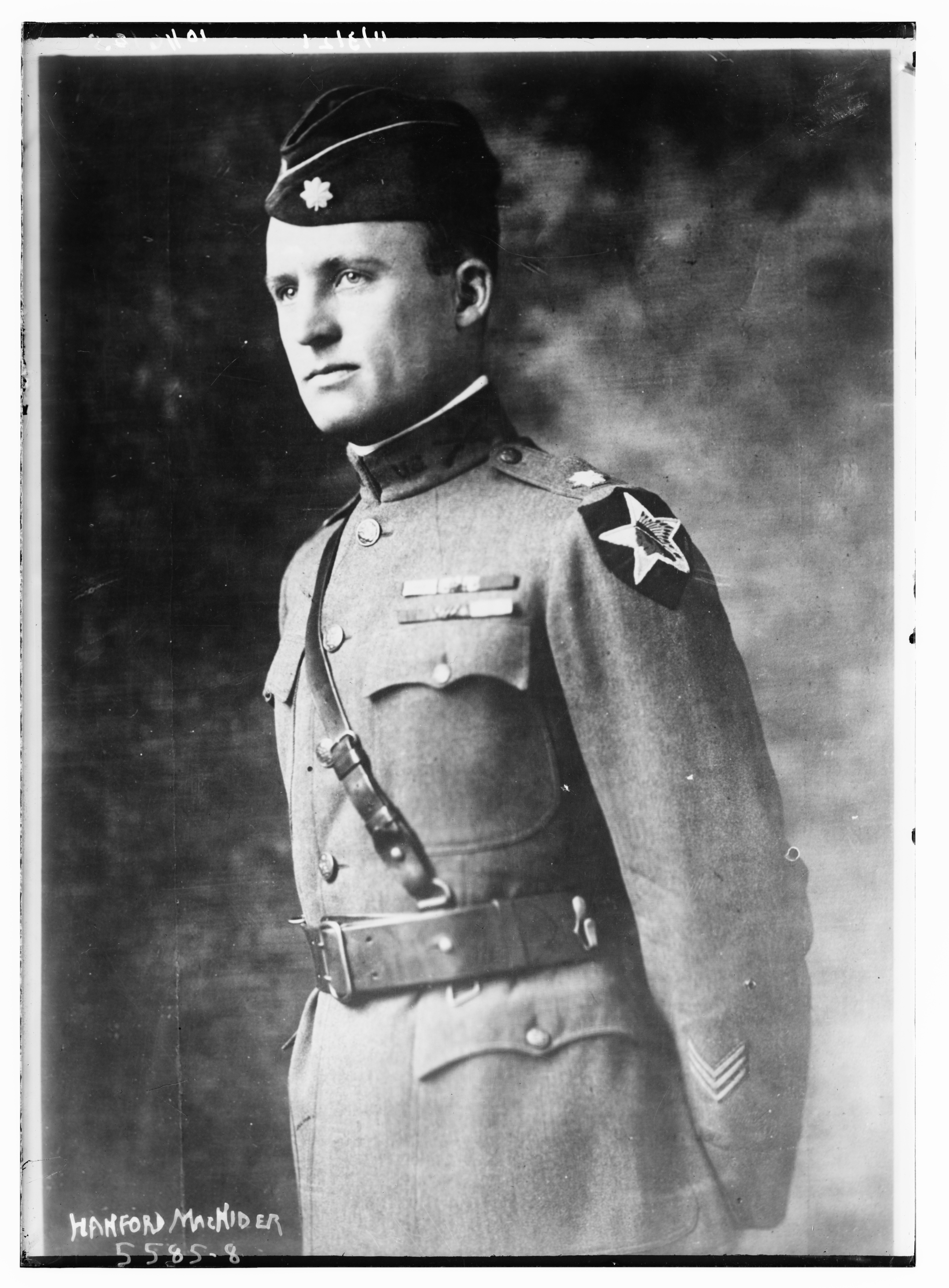
MacNider, presumably sometime during World War I or during the interwar period

MacNider joined the National Guard and served during the Pancho Villa Expedition during the Mexican Revolution. During World War I, he served as a captain in the 2nd Division within American Expeditionary Forces in France. The story goes that military charges were laid against him when one of his men disagreed with a colonel. He then supposedly went AWOL to get to the front. When authorities finally caught up to him, he had already risen through the ranks to Lieutenant Colonel and won 14 medals, so charges were dropped. For extraordinary heroism in the battle, MacNider was decorated with two Distinguished Service Cross, three Silver Stars, Italian War Merit Cross, French Légion d'honneur, and French Croix de Guerre with Palm.

== The American Legion ==
MacNider was Commander of the American Legion Department of Iowa, from 1920 to 1921, before being elevated to the office of National Commander, serving from 1921 to 1922.

== Political career ==
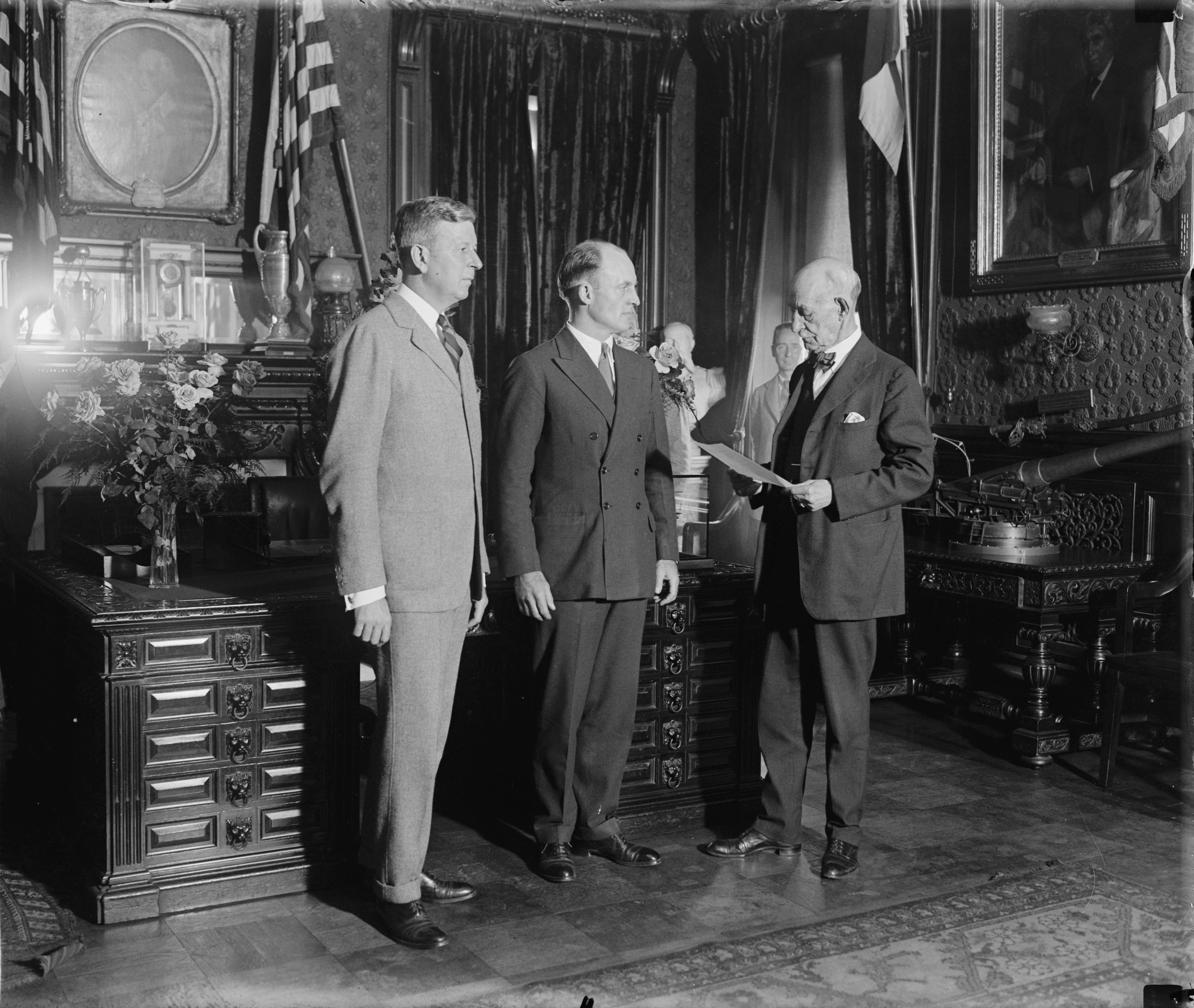
MacNider is sworn in as Assistant Secretary of War, 16 October 1925

President Calvin Coolidge appointed MacNider Assistant Secretary of War in 1925 where Major Dwight Eisenhower was his executive assistant. He married Margaret McAuley in 1925. He was considered a possible Republican candidate in the 1928 United States presidential election, but after the death of his father, MacNider returned to Iowa to handle the family's business affairs which thrived despite the Depression.

President Herbert Hoover appointed him as Envoy Extraordinary and Minister Plenipotentiary (Canada) in 1930. In 1932, he resigned in an unsuccessful attempt to be made the Republican candidate for vice president. In 1940, he again failed to receive the Republican nomination for president and declined the vice presidential candidacy under Wendell Lewis Willkie. He also turned down a cabinet position offered by President Dwight Eisenhower.

== World War II ==
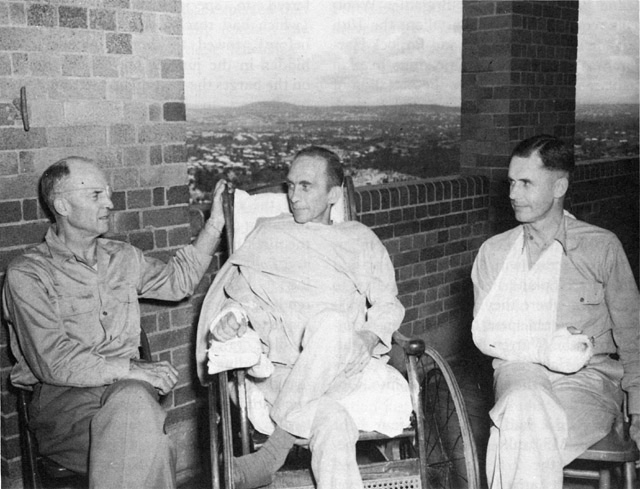
Brigadier Generals Hanford MacNider, Albert W. Waldron, and Clovis E. Byers recuperate in hospital in Australia after being wounded in the Battle of Buna-Gona

During World War II, he was wounded while commanding the Buna Task Force in New Guinea. After recovery, he was given the command of the 158th Regimental Combat Team (the Bushmasters) at the Bicol Peninsula. His command of the 158th RCT in the Philippines was excellent and it was there that some of the toughest fighting of the war occurred.

A regimental story states that men of the 3rd battalion became intoxicated from a cache of Japanese sake. Upon finding them, MacNider drank a bottle of sake and criticized the troops. MacNider was recognized by the men of the 158th for his leadership during combat, contributing to his long-standing reputation within the regiment.

MacNider was eventually promoted to brigadier general in the United States Army, and then major general until his retirement in 1951. After retirement, he was promoted to lieutenant general by an act of Congress on 7 August 1956. He is one of only four individuals to be promoted to lieutenant general after retirement from the army.

== Death ==
On 18 February 1968, while on vacation in Sarasota, Florida, he died at a hospital of pulmonary edema. It has been said that he was interred in Mason City's Elmwood Saint Joseph Cemetery; the cemetery office has no record of his burial, and it is believed that he was cremated and his ashes scattered in an unknown location.

== Military awards ==
Hanford MacNider received during his military career many decorations and awards for heroism and distinguished service. Here are official citations of the most important military decorations:

=== First Distinguished Service Cross citation ===
The official U.S. Army citation for his first Distinguished Service Cross reads:

General Orders: War Department, General Orders No. 44 (1919)
Action Date: 3–9 October 1918
Name: Hanford MacNider
Service: Army
Rank: Captain
Regiment: 9th Infantry Regiment
Division: 2d Division, American Expeditionary Forces
Citation: The President of the United States of America, authorized by Act of Congress, July 9, 1918, takes pleasure in presenting the Distinguished Service Cross to Captain (Infantry) Hanford MacNider, United States Army, for extraordinary heroism in action while serving with 9th Infantry Regiment, 2d Division, A.E.F., near Medeah Ferme, France, October 3–9, 1918. Captain MacNider voluntarily joined an attacking battalion on 3 October and accompanied it to its final objectives. During the second attack on the same day, he acted as a runner through heavy artillery and machine-gun fire. He visited the lines both night and day, where the fighting was most severe. When higher authority could not be reached, he assumed responsibilities, and gave the necessary orders to stabilize serious situations. When new and untried troops took up the attack, he joined their forward elements, determined the enemy points of resistance by personal reconnaissance, uncovered enemy machine-gun nests and supervised their destruction.

=== Second Distinguished Service Cross citation ===
The official U.S. Army citation for his second Distinguished Service Cross reads:

General Orders: War Department, General Orders No. 44 (1919)
Action Date: 12 September 918
Name: Hanford MacNider
Service: Army
Rank: Captain
Regiment: 9th Infantry Regiment
Division: 2d Division, American Expeditionary Forces
Citation: The President of the United States of America, authorized by Act of Congress, 9 July1918, takes pleasure in presenting a Bronze Oak Leaf Cluster in lieu of a Second Award of the Distinguished Service Cross to Captain (Infantry) Hanford MacNider, United States Army, for extraordinary heroism in action while serving with 9th Infantry Regiment, 2d Division, A.E.F., near Remeriauville, France, 12 September 1918. On duty as regimental adjutant, while carrying instructions to the assaulting lines, Captain MacNider found the line unable to advance and being disorganized by a heavy machine-gun fire. Running forward in the face of the fire, this officer captured a German machine-gun, drove off the crew, reorganized the line on that flank, and thereby enabled the advance to continue.

=== Third Distinguished Service Cross citation ===
The official U.S. Army citation for his third Distinguished Service Cross reads:

General Orders: Headquarters, South West Pacific Area, General Orders No. 12 (1943)
Name: Hanford MacNider
Service: Army
Rank: Brigadier General
Regiment: Commanding officer
Division: Buna Task Force
Citation: Brigadier General Hanford MacNider, United States Army, was awarded a Second Bronze Oak Leaf Cluster in lieu of a Third Award of the Distinguished Service Cross for extraordinary heroism in connection with military operations against an armed enemy, in action against enemy forces during World War II. Brigadier General MacNider's intrepid actions, personal bravery and zealous devotion to duty exemplify the highest traditions of the military forces of the United States and reflect great credit upon himself, his unit, and the United States Army.

=== Distinguished Service Medal citation ===
The official U.S. Army citation for his Distinguished Service Medal reads:

General Orders: War Department, General Orders No. 89 (13 August 1946)
Action Date: October 1943 - October 1945
Name: Hanford MacNider
Service: Army
Rank: Brigadier General
Regiment: Commanding officer
Division: Buna Task Force
Citation: The President of the United States of America, authorized by Act of Congress 9 July 1918, takes pleasure in presenting the Army Distinguished Service Medal to Brigadier General Hanford MacNider (ASN: 0-108101), United States Army, for exceptionally meritorious and distinguished services to the Government of the United States, in a duty of great responsibility during the period from October 1943 to October 1945. The singularly distinctive accomplishments of General MacNider reflect the highest credit upon himself and the United States Army.

== Ribbon bar ==
Here is the ribbon bar of Lieutenant General (Ret.) Hanford MacNider:

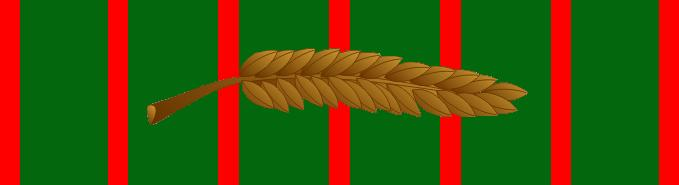

1st Row	Distinguished Service Cross w/ two OLCs		Distinguished Service Medal	Silver Star w/ two OLCs
2nd Row	Legion of Merit w/ OLC	Bronze Star Medal w/ OLC	Air Medal	Purple Heart w/ OLC
3rd Row	Mexican Border Service Medal	World War I Victory Medal w/ five Battle Clasps	American Defense Service Medal	American Campaign Medal
4th Row	Asiatic-Pacific Campaign Medal w/ Arrowhead Device, one silver and one bronze Service Star	World War II Victory Medal	Army of Occupation Medal w/ Japan Clasp	French Legion of Honour Commandeur grade
5th Row	French Croix de Guerre w/ Palm	Italian Cross of War Merit	Philippine Legion of Honor	Philippine Liberation Medal w/ bronze Service Star

== See also ==
- List of people from Iowa

Non-profit organization positions
Preceded by John G. Emery	National Commander of The American Legion; 1921 – 1922	Succeeded by Alvin M. Owsley
Political offices
Preceded by Dwight F. Davis	United States Assistant Secretary of War; 1925 - 1928	Succeeded by Charles B. Robbins
Diplomatic posts
Preceded by William Phillips	United States Ambassador to Canada; 1930 – 1932	Succeeded by Nathan MacChesney
