= Charles Burton Robbins =

American army officer (1877–1943)

Charles B. Robbins
- Born: November 6, 1877; Hastings, Iowa
- Died: July 5, 1943 (aged 65); Cedar Rapids, Iowa
- Resting place: Arlington National Cemetery
- Spouse: Helen Larrabee Robbins (m. 1903; died 1919)

United States Assistant Secretary of War
- In office January 4, 1928 – March 5, 1929
- President: Calvin Coolidge
- Preceded by: Hanford MacNider
- Succeeded by: Patrick J. Hurley
- Military career
- Allegiance: United States of America
- Branch: United States Army
- Rank: Colonel
- Conflicts: Spanish-American War; Philippine-American War; World War I
- Awards: Silver Star; Purple Heart

Charles Burton Robbins (November 6, 1877 – July 5, 1943) was a United States Army officer and United States Assistant Secretary of War from 1928 to 1929.

== Biography ==
Robbins was born on November 6, 1877, in Hastings, Iowa. His family relocated to Lincoln, Nebraska, in 1893. Both of his parents died and Robbins went to a private school in Long Island, New York. He graduated from the University of Nebraska in 1898.

After graduating, Robbins enlisted into the United States Army to serve in the Spanish-American War. Fighting in the Battle of Marilao River on March 27, 1899, Robbins was wounded in action. He was commissioned as a lieutenant when he was sent to the Philippine-American War. After the war, Robbins enrolled at Columbia Law School and enlisted in the New York National Guard.

Robbins returned to Iowa in 1903 to practice insurance law. He also married Helen Larrabee, the daughter of Governor William Larrabee and Anna Matilda Larrabee. In 1909, Governor Beryl F. Carroll appointed Robbins as a judge on the superior court of to the Cedar Rapids, Iowa. During World War I, he served as adjutant to Brigadier General Hubert Allison Allen at Camp Cody, New Mexico. Following the war, Robbins was promoted to major in the Army Reserves and then to colonel in the Officers Reserve Corps.

In January 1928, President Calvin Coolidge appointed Robbins as Assistant Secretary of War, succeeding Hanford MacNider. He submitted his resignation on March 5, 1929.

Robbins died on July 5, 1943, in Cedar Rapids. He was buried at Arlington National Cemetery in Arlington, Virginia.
