= Elgin, Iowa =

- City
- Nickname: The Little Switzerland of Iowa
- Location of Elgin, Iowa
- Coordinates: 42°57′18″N 91°37′51″W
- Country: United States
- State: Iowa
- County: Fayette

Area
  - Total: 0.68 sq mi (1.76 km^{2})
  - Land: 0.68 sq mi (1.76 km^{2})
  - Water: 0 sq mi (0.00 km^{2})
- Elevation: 820 ft (250 m)

Population (2020)
  - Total: 685
  - Density: 1,009.8/sq mi (389.88/km^{2})
- Time zone: UTC-6 (Central (CST))
  - Summer (DST): UTC-5 (CDT)
- ZIP code: 52141
- Area code: 563
- FIPS code: 19-24645
- GNIS feature ID: 2394643
- Website: www.elginia.com

Elgin is a city in Fayette County, Iowa, United States. The population was 685 at the time of the 2020 census.

== Geography ==
Elgin is located at the confluence of Otter Creek with the Turkey River. According to the United States Census Bureau, the city has a total area of 0.66 square miles (1.71 km^{2}), all land.

Elgin and the neighboring towns of Clermont and Wadena made up the Valley Community School district. Due to diminishing class sizes and less aid from the state of Iowa, Valley combined services in 2013 with the nearby North Fayette School district, which comprises the towns of West Union, Hawkeye and Fayette and the combined district is now called North Fayette Valley, with the middle school being in Elgin and the high school located in West Union. The school's mascot is now called the Tigerhawks (from a combination of the two schools' mascots, the Tigers and the Hawks, respectively).

Historical populations
Year	Pop.	±%
1880	428	—
1890	369	−13.8%
1900	635	+72.1%
1910	564	−11.2%
1920	623	+10.5%
1930	610	−2.1%
1940	638	+4.6%
1950	642	+0.6%
1960	644	+0.3%
1970	613	−4.8%
1980	702	+14.5%
1990	637	−9.3%
2000	676	+6.1%
2010	683	+1.0%
2020	685	+0.3%
Source:"U.S. Census website". United States Census Bureau. and Iowa Data Center; Source: U.S. Decennial Census

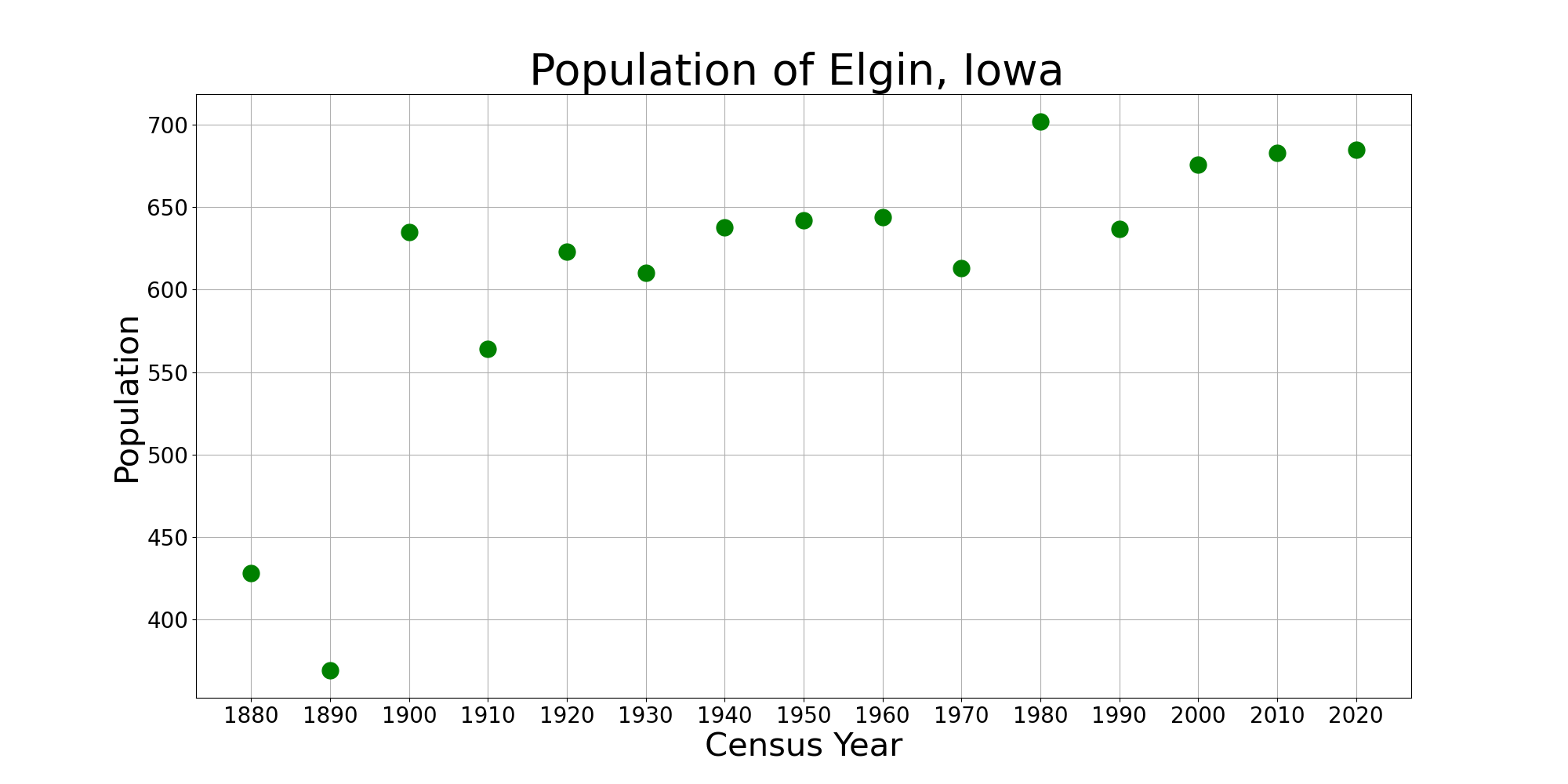
The population of Elgin, Iowa from US census data

== History ==
The area had previously been the home of Sioux and Winnebago Indians. After the 1846 Winnebago Treaty, Indians were forcibly removed from the area by the US military and moved to Minnesota. In the summer of 1848, a flood of white settlers arrived. Matthew Conner built a log cabin and general store and the settlement was first called "Shin Bone Valley." Surveyor K. M. Marcks renamed the town "Elgin" in 1851 in honor of his hometown, Elgin, Illinois. Benjamin Dimond became the postmaster at Elgin in 1852, the Burlington, Cedar Rapids and Minnesota Railway came through in 1872, and the Elgin Times newspaper was established in 1875. The town subsequently became a major destination for Swiss immigrants.

== Demographics ==
=== 2020 census ===
As of the census of 2020, there were 685 people, 310 households, and 181 families residing in the city. The population density was 1,009.8 inhabitants per square mile (389.9/km^{2}). There were 341 housing units at an average density of 502.7 per square mile (194.1/km^{2}). The racial makeup of the city was 95.8% White, 0.3% Black or African American, 0.1% Native American, 0.3% Asian, 0.0% Pacific Islander, 0.6% from other races and 2.9% from two or more races. Hispanic or Latino persons of any race comprised 2.0% of the population.

Of the 310 households, 22.9% of which had children under the age of 18 living with them, 45.2% were married couples living together, 7.1% were cohabitating couples, 25.5% had a female householder with no spouse or partner present and 22.3% had a male householder with no spouse or partner present. 41.6% of all households were non-families. 35.8% of all households were made up of individuals, 18.1% had someone living alone who was 65 years old or older.

The median age in the city was 41.3 years. 26.4% of the residents were under the age of 20; 6.0% were between the ages of 20 and 24; 21.3% were from 25 and 44; 22.3% were from 45 and 64; and 23.9% were 65 years of age or older. The gender makeup of the city was 51.1% male and 48.9% female.

=== 2010 census ===
As of the census of 2010, there were 683 people, 318 households, and 191 families living in the city. The population density was 1,034.8 inhabitants per square mile (399.5/km^{2}). There were 343 housing units at an average density of 519.7 per square mile (200.7/km^{2}). The racial makeup of the city was 98.8% White, 0.1% African American, 0.4% Native American, 0.1% from other races, and 0.4% from two or more races. Hispanic or Latino of any race were 1.0% of the population.

There were 318 households, of which 25.2% had children under the age of 18 living with them, 48.1% were married couples living together, 6.9% had a female householder with no husband present, 5.0% had a male householder with no wife present, and 39.9% were non-families. 36.2% of all households were made up of individuals, and 17.7% had someone living alone who was 65 years of age or older. The average household size was 2.15 and the average family size was 2.75.

The median age in the city was 43.8 years. 23.3% of residents were under the age of 18; 8.4% were between the ages of 18 and 24; 19.7% were from 25 to 44; 25.3% were from 45 to 64; and 23.3% were 65 years of age or older. The gender makeup of the city was 49.3% male and 50.7% female.

=== 2000 census ===
As of the census of 2000, there were 676 people, 327 households, and 182 families living in the city. The population density was 1,011.3 inhabitants per square mile (390.5/km^{2}). There were 349 housing units at an average density of 522.1 per square mile (201.6/km^{2}). The racial makeup of the city was 99.85% White, 0.15% from other races. Hispanic or Latino of any race were 0.30% of the population.

There were 327 households, out of which 22.6% had children under the age of 18 living with them, 45.3% were married couples living together, 8.6% had a female householder with no husband present, and 44.3% were non-families. 37.9% of all households were made up of individuals, and 25.4% had someone living alone who was 65 years of age or older. The average household size was 2.07 and the average family size was 2.70.

In the city, the population was spread out, with 20.7% under the age of 18, 7.4% from 18 to 24, 23.1% from 25 to 44, 19.7% from 45 to 64, and 29.1% who were 65 years of age or older. The median age was 44 years. For every 100 females, there were 91.0 males. For every 100 females age 18 and over, there were 84.2 males.

The median income for a household in the city was $28,833, and the median income for a family was $38,571. Males had a median income of $28,750 versus $21,979 for females. The per capita income for the city was $16,225. About 6.9% of families and 7.8% of the population were below the poverty line, including 4.0% of those under age 18 and 17.1% of those age 65 or over.

== Education ==
Elgin is a part of the North Fayette Valley Community School District. It was previously a part of the Valley Community School District, which merged into the North Fayette Valley district on July 1, 2018.

== See also ==
- List of cities in Iowa
