= J. Mayhew Wainwright =

American politician (1864–1945)

Jonathan Mayhew Wainwright
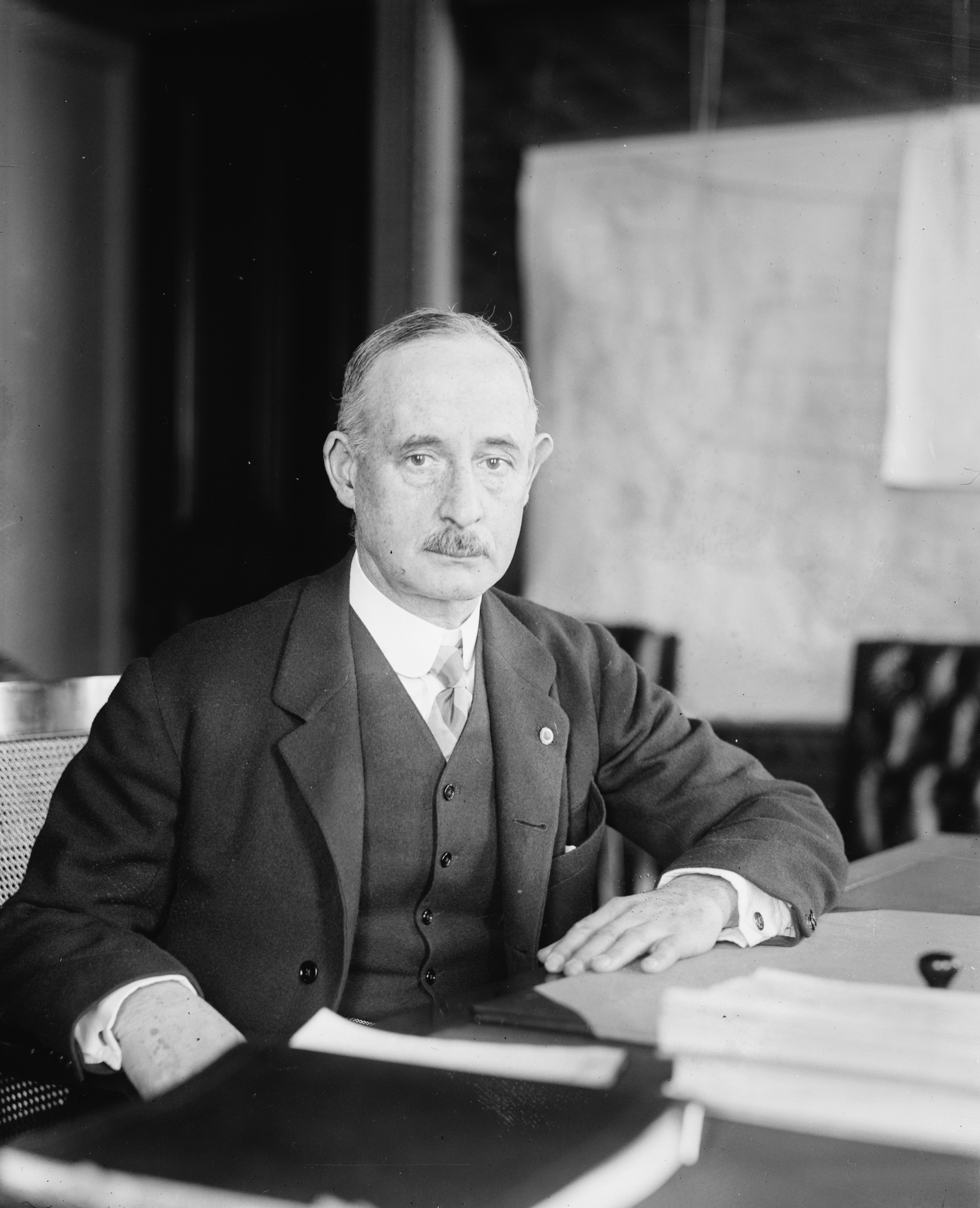

United States Assistant Secretary of War
- In office March 14, 1921 – March 4, 1923
- Appointed by: Warren G. Harding
- Preceded by: William Reid Williams
- Succeeded by: Dwight Filley Davis

Member of the U.S. House of Representatives from New York's 25th district
- In office March 4, 1923 – March 3, 1931
- Preceded by: James W. Husted
- Succeeded by: Charles D. Millard

Member of the New York Senate from the 24th district
- In office January 1, 1909 – December 31, 1912
- Preceded by: John C. R. Taylor
- Succeeded by: John F. Healy

Member of the New York State Assembly
- In office January 1, 1902 – December 31, 1908
- Preceded by: Alford W. Cooley
- Succeeded by: George W. Mead
- Constituency: 2nd Westchester (1902–1906); 4th Westchester (1907–1908)

Personal details
- Born: Jonathan Mayhew Wainwright; December 10, 1864 Manhattan, New York City, U.S.
- Died: June 3, 1945 (aged 80) Rye, New York, U.S.
- Party: Republican Party
- Spouse: Laura Wallace Buchanan (m. 1892)
- Parent(s): John Howard Wainwright; Margaret Livingston Stuyvesant
- Education: Columbia College; Columbia Law School
- Occupation: Attorney

Jonathan Mayhew Wainwright (December 10, 1864 – June 3, 1945) was an American lawyer and politician from New York. He was the United States Assistant Secretary of War from 1921 to 1923.

== Early life ==
Wainwright was born in Manhattan, New York City, to John Howard Wainwright and Margaret Livingston (née Stuyvesant) Wainwright. His older brother was Stuyvesant Wainwright (father of Carroll Livingston Wainwright), and their paternal grandfather was the Rt. Rev. Jonathan Mayhew Wainwright, Bishop of New York.

His maternal grandfather was Nicholas Stuyvesant, a son of Nicholas William Stuyvesant, grandson of the merchant Peter Stuyvesant, all direct descendants of Peter Stuyvesant, the last Dutch Director-General of New Amsterdam. U.S. Army General Jonathan M. Wainwright was his cousin.

Wainwright graduated from Columbia College; from Columbia School of Political Science in 1884, and from Columbia Law School in 1886. While at Columbia, he was a member of St. Anthony Hall and the Philolexian Society.

== Career ==
In 1886, he was admitted to the bar the same year and practiced in New York City and in Westchester County. He served in the Twelfth Infantry of the New York National Guard (1889–1903), and in the Spanish–American War as captain of the Twelfth Regiment of New York Volunteers.

Wainwright was a member of the New York State Assembly in 1902, 1903, 1904, 1905, 1906 (all five Westchester Co., 2nd D.), 1907 and 1908 (both Westchester Co., 4th D.).

He was a member of the New York State Senate (24th D.) from 1909 to 1912, sitting in the 132nd, 133rd, 134th and 135th New York State Legislatures.

He was appointed as a member of the first New York State Workmen's Compensation Commission in 1914 and served until 1915. He served as lieutenant colonel, inspector general's department, New York National Guard, on the Mexican border in 1916. During the First World War, Wainwright served as a lieutenant colonel in the Twenty-seventh Division from 1917 to 1919.

He was appointed by President Warren G. Harding to serve as Assistant Secretary of War from March 14, 1921, to March 4, 1923, when he resigned.

Wainwright was elected as a Republican to the 68th, 69th, 70th and 71st United States Congresses, holding office from March 4, 1923, to March 3, 1931. He resumed the practice of law and served as a member of the Westchester County Park Commission from 1930 to 1937.

== Personal life ==
He married Laura Wallace Buchanan (1865–1946) on November 23, 1892 in New York. Together, they were the parents of:

- Fonrose Wainwright (1893–1983), who married Phillip King Condict (1880–1949).

He died on June 3, 1945, in Rye, New York. His funeral was held at Christ's Church, Rye, and he was buried at the Greenwood Union Cemetery.

New York State Assembly
Preceded by Alford W. Cooley	New York State Assembly; Westchester County, 2nd District; 1902–1906	Succeeded by Holland S. Duell
Preceded by new district	New York State Assembly; Westchester County, 4th District; 1907–1908	Succeeded by George W. Mead
New York State Senate
Preceded by John C. R. Taylor	New York State Senate; 24th District; 1909–1912	Succeeded by John F. Healy
U.S. House of Representatives
Preceded by James W. Husted	Member of the U.S. House of Representatives from New York's 25th congressional district 1923–1931	Succeeded by Charles D. Millard
