= William Reid Williams =

United States Assistant Secretary of War from 1920 to 1921

United States Assistant Secretary of War
- In office August 1, 1920 – March 27, 1921
- Appointed by: Woodrow Wilson
- Preceded by: Benedict Crowell
- Succeeded by: Jonathan Mayhew Wainwright

Personal details
- Born: 1866
- Died: July 24, 1931 (aged 65) Richmond, Virginia, US

William Reid Williams (1866 - July 24, 1931) was the United States Assistant Secretary of War from 1920 to 1921.

== Biography ==
He was born in 1866. He was the United States Assistant Secretary of War from 1920 to 1921. He died on July 24, 1931, in Richmond, Virginia.
