= Frederic Larrabee =

American politician (1873–1959)

Frederic Larrabee (November 3, 1873 – August 27, 1959) was an American politician.

Frederic Larrabee was one of seven children of parents William Larrabee and Anna Matilda Larrabee. Born on November 3, 1873, Frederic Larrabee graduated high school in his hometown of Clermont, Iowa, earned his bachelor's degree from the University of Iowa in 1897, followed by his law degree from the UIowa College of Law in 1898. He then enrolled at Columbia University, and served in the Iowa Army National Guard with the 56th Regiment.

Larrabee moved to Fort Dodge in 1901, to work in real estate, as a farm supervisor and stock raiser of Brown Swiss cattle, and to practice law. He chaired the Republican Party of Iowa branch in Webster County, was elected to the Iowa Senate for District 27 in 1908 and 1912, and attended the 1924 Republican National Convention. Between 1929 and 1937, Larrabee was president of the Iowa State Dairy Association. Frederic and his elder brother William Jr. were colleagues in the Iowa General Assembly, as William Jr. served in the Iowa House of Representatives.

Around 1953, Frederic Larrabee retired to Clermont, where he died on August 27, 1959, at the age of 85.
