= William Larrabee Jr. =

American politician (1870–1933)

William Larrabee Jr. (December 11, 1870 – April 1, 1933) was an American politician.

William Larrabee Jr. was born on December 11, 1870, one of seven children to parents William Larrabee Sr. and his wife Anna Matilda Larrabee. Larrabee Jr. was educated in his hometown of Clermont, Iowa, and later enrolled at the University of Iowa and its College of Law, earning a bachelor's degree in 1893, followed by a law degree in 1896. In 1891 and 1892, Larrabee Jr. was a letterwinner for the Iowa Hawkeyes football team. He served in the Spanish–American War with Company G of the 52nd Iowa Volunteer Infantry.

Like his father, Larrabee Jr. was affiliated with the Republican Party. The younger Larrabee worked for Iowa Governor Francis M. Drake and Drake's successor L. M. Shaw before winning his first election to the Iowa House of Representatives in 1901. Larrabee served a full two-year term for District 71, stepping down in 1904, before he was reelected to the same seat, and consecutive terms, in 1908, 1910, and 1912. During William Jr.'s later stint in the Iowa House, his brother Frederic served in the Iowa Senate.

William Larrabee Jr. died on April 1, 1933, aged 61.
