= Wadena, Iowa =

- City
- Location of Wadena, Iowa
- Coordinates: 42°50′23″N 91°39′34″W
- Country: United States
- State: Iowa
- County: Fayette
- Incorporated: July 11, 1895

Area
  - Total: 0.75 sq mi (1.95 km^{2})
  - Land: 0.75 sq mi (1.95 km^{2})
  - Water: 0 sq mi (0.00 km^{2})
- Elevation: 860 ft (260 m)

Population (2020)
  - Total: 209
  - Density: 277.9/sq mi (107.31/km^{2})
- Time zone: UTC-6 (Central (CST))
  - Summer (DST): UTC-5 (CDT)
- ZIP code: 52169
- Area code: 563
- FIPS code: 19-81570
- GNIS feature ID: 2397161
- Website: www.wadenaiowa.com

Wadena is a city in Fayette County, Iowa, United States. The population was 209 at the time of the 2020 census.

== Geography ==
Wadena is located along Iowa County Road W51, two miles south of Iowa State Route 56. It is located in Iowa's Driftless Area.

According to the United States Census Bureau, the city has a total area of 0.74 square miles (1.92 km^{2}), all land.

The Volga River is located on the south side of the city.

== Demographics ==
Historical populations
Year	Pop.	±%
1900	170	—
1910	253	+48.8%
1920	318	+25.7%
1930	312	−1.9%
1940	377	+20.8%
1950	316	−16.2%
1960	275	−13.0%
1970	237	−13.8%
1980	230	−3.0%
1990	236	+2.6%
2000	243	+3.0%
2010	262	+7.8%
2020	209	−20.2%
Source:"U.S. Census website". United States Census Bureau. and Iowa Data Center; Source: U.S. Decennial Census

=== 2020 census ===
As of the census of 2020, there were 209 people, 107 households, and 55 families residing in the city. The population density was 277.9 inhabitants per square mile (107.3/km^{2}). There were 109 housing units at an average density of 144.9 per square mile (56.0/km^{2}). The racial makeup of the city was 92.8% White, 0.5% Black or African American, 0.0% Native American, 0.0% Asian, 0.0% Pacific Islander, 1.0% from other races and 5.7% from two or more races. Hispanic or Latino persons of any race comprised 1.0% of the population.

Of the 107 households, 26.2% of which had children under the age of 18 living with them, 36.4% were married couples living together, 12.1% were cohabitating couples, 17.8% had a female householder with no spouse or partner present and 33.6% had a male householder with no spouse or partner present. 48.6% of all households were non-families. 37.4% of all households were made up of individuals, 17.8% had someone living alone who was 65 years old or older.

The median age in the city was 46.9 years. 22.5% of the residents were under the age of 20; 2.4% were between the ages of 20 and 24; 22.5% were from 25 and 44; 26.8% were from 45 and 64; and 25.8% were 65 years of age or older. The gender makeup of the city was 56.5% male and 43.5% female.

=== 2010 census ===
As of the census of 2010, there were 262 people, 111 households, and 68 families residing in the city. The population density was 354.1 inhabitants per square mile (136.7/km^{2}). There were 123 housing units at an average density of 166.2 units per square mile (64.2 units/km^{2}). The racial makeup of the city was 99.2% White and 0.8% from two or more races. Hispanic or Latino of any race were 0.8% of the population.

There were 111 households, of which 30.6% had children under the age of 18 living with them, 48.6% were married couples living together, 8.1% had a female householder with no husband present, 4.5% had a male householder with no wife present, and 38.7% were non-families. 28.8% of all households were made up of individuals, and 15.3% had someone living alone who was 65 years of age or older. The average household size was 2.36 and the average family size was 2.94.

The median age in the city was 37.6 years. 26.7% of residents were under the age of 18; 9.9% were between the ages of 18 and 24; 21% were from 25 to 44; 25.9% were from 45 to 64; and 16.4% were 65 years of age or older. The gender makeup of the city was 49.6% male and 50.4% female.

=== 2000 census ===
As of the census of 2000, there were 243 people, 111 households, and 71 families residing in the city. The population density was 329.8 inhabitants per square mile (127.3/km^{2}). There were 127 housing units at an average density of 172.4 units per square mile (66.6 units/km^{2}). The racial makeup of the city was 98.77% White, 0.41% African American, and 0.82% from two or more races.

There were 111 households, out of which 28.8% had children under the age of 18 living with them, 48.6% were married couples living together, 12.6% had a female householder with no husband present, and 36.0% were non-families. 32.4% of all households were made up of individuals, and 13.5% had someone living alone who was 65 years of age or older. The average household size was 2.19 and the average family size was 2.76.

In the city, the population was spread out, with 24.3% under the age of 18, 6.6% from 18 to 24, 23.9% from 25 to 44, 25.5% from 45 to 64, and 19.8% who were 65 years of age or older. The median age was 41 years. For every 100 females, there were 86.9 males. For every 100 females age 18 and over, there were 87.8 males.

The median income for a household in the city was $25,500, and the median income for a family was $31,563. Males had a median income of $32,250 versus $14,688 for females. The per capita income for the city was $13,861. About 7.1% of families and 14.3% of the population were below the poverty line, including 24.7% of those under the age of eighteen and 5.6% of those 65 or over.

== Education ==
Wadena is a part of the North Fayette Valley Community School District. It was previously a part of the Valley Community School District, which merged into the North Fayette Valley district on July 1, 2018.

In 2013, the Valley Community School District entered a Whole-Grade Sharing Agreement with neighboring North Fayette CSD to become North Fayette Valley. The new mascot is the Tigerhawk, a combination of both schools' former mascots, the Valley Tigers and the North Fayette Hawks. Grades 9-12 are located in West Union at the North Fayette Valley High School. Grades 7-8 are located at the North Fayette Valley Middle School between Elgin and Clermont. Unless open enrolled out, all elementary students in Wadena will attend Valley Elementary, located in the same building as the NFV Middle School.
