= Larabee, California =

Coordinates: 40°24′22″N 123°55′45″W

Larabee (formerly, Larrabee and Laribee) is a locality in Humboldt County, California. It is located on the Northwestern Pacific Railroad 1 mile (2 km) east-northeast of Redcrest, at an elevation of 161 feet (49 m). Larabee only has seasonal access across the Eel River; alternatively there is a former lumber road through Larabee Ranch, and on through Pacific Lumber Company property, that connects to Shively Road approximately five miles northwest. This road is only open during the winter when the temporary summer bridge is washed away by the rain-engorged Eel River.

== History ==
Larabee, a historic settlement and community from the 1800s through today, is named after an early pioneer rancher of the area, Henry P. Larrabee (1830-1906). Also known as Hank Larrabee, he was a 49er and a local rancher, and a militiaman in the Bald Hills War, believed to have been among the perpetrators in the Indian Island Massacre. The settlement that later developed near his ranch at its peak had a blacksmith shop, stable, general store, school house, and productive farms and orchards. When the Northwestern Pacific Railroad was constructed residents had more ready access to the rest of the county and points south. All of the considerable low-lying community that was within reach of the river was swept away by the great floods of 1955 and 1964; the buildings that remain today were left untouched by the waters given their elevation just out of reach of the Eel River. Today Larabee is a quiet settlement with a handful of residents, well bypassed by Highway U.S. 101 and on the abandoned Northwestern Pacific Railroad.

The Laribee post office operated from 1888 to 1891, and from 1892 to 1899. The Larabee post office operated from 1921 (having been transferred from Dinty) to 1943. Larabee has regular mail delivery but is within the Redcrest, California postal zip code.

== See also ==
Skelly, California
