= United States Assistant Secretary of War =

US Government position

- United States Department of War
- Reports to: United States Secretary of War
- Appointer: President of the United States with Senate advice and consent
- Term length: No fixed term
- First holder: Thomas Alexander Scott
- Final holder: Howard C. Petersen

Flag of the United States Assistant Secretary of War. It is now the flag of the U.S. Under Secretary of the Army.

The United States assistant secretary of war was the second–ranking official within the American Department of War from 1861 to 1867, from 1882 to 1883, and from 1890 to 1940. According to the military laws of the United States, "The act of August 5, 1882 authorizing the appointment of an assistant secretary of war was repealed by the act of July 7, 1884 (23 Stat L., 331) the power conferred by the act of August 5, 1882 never having been exercised," indicating that the post was not filled between 1882 and 1883 (p. 45, footnote 2).

In 1940, the new position of United States under secretary of war replaced this position as the number-two office in the department. Assistant Secretary Robert P. Patterson became the first under secretary.

The office continued to exercise administrative duties until the department's end in 1947, when the United States Department of Defense was established.

== List of assistant secretaries of war ==
This list only includes those persons who served as the assistant secretary, or first assistant secretary. At various times, there were also "second" or "third" assistant secretaries, ranking below the assistant secretary.

- Thomas Alexander Scott (March 10, 1861 – January 24, 1862)
- Peter H. Watson (January 24, 1862 – January 28, 1862)
- John Tucker (January 29, 1862 – June 10, 1862)
- Christopher Parsons Wolcott (June 11, 1862 – April 4, 1863) died in office
- Charles Anderson Dana (January 28, 1864 – July 26, 1866)
- Thomas Thompson Eckert (July 27, 1866 – 1867) –– under Edwin M. Stanton during Andrew Johnson's presidency, office abolished 1868
- Lewis Addison Grant (c. 1890–1893)
- Joseph Doe (c. 1893–1897)
- George de Rue Meiklejohn (1897–1901)
- William Cary Sanger (1901–1903)
- Robert Shaw Oliver (1903–1913)
- Henry Skillman Breckinridge (1913–1916) –– under Lindley M. Garrison during Woodrow Wilson's presidency
- William Moulton Ingraham (1916–1917)
- Benedict Crowell (1917–1920)
- William Reid Williams (1920–1921)
- Jonathan Mayhew Wainwright (c. 1921–1923)
- Dwight F. Davis (1923–1925)
- Hanford MacNider (October 16, 1925 – January 4, 1928)
- Charles B. Robbins (January 4, 1928 – March 5, 1929)
- Patrick J. Hurley (March 5, 1929 – December 1929)
- Frederick Huff Payne (1930– c. 1933)
- Harry Hines Woodring (1933–1936)
- Louis A. Johnson (1937–1940)
- Robert P. Patterson (1940)
- John J. McCloy (c. 1941–1945)
- Howard C. Petersen (c. 1945–1947)

== Assistant Secretary of War for Air ==
The Air Corps Act of 1926 (44 Stat. 780), passed on July 2 of that year, created a second assistant secretary position in the War Department variously called "Assistant Secretary of War for Aviation," "Assistant Secretary of War for Air," or "Assistant Secretary of War for Aeronautics." Those holding the office, with an eigh-–year vacancy between 1933 and 1941, were F. Trubee Davison (1926–1933), Robert A. Lovett (1941–1945), and Stuart Symington (1946–1947), who became the first United States Secretary of the Air Force.

== See also ==
- United States Secretary of War
