= Clermont, Iowa =

- City
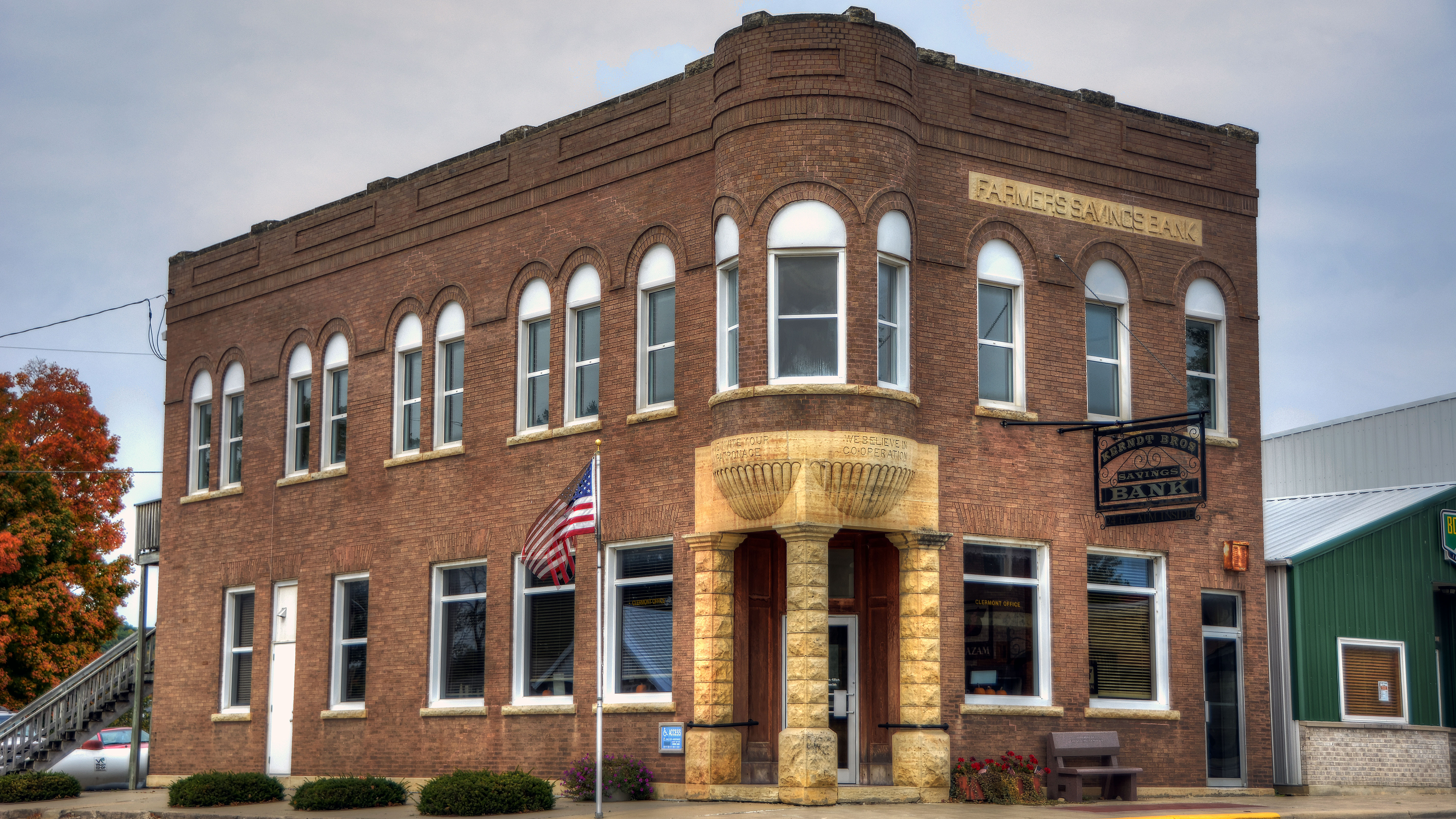
- Kerndt Brothers Savings Bank
- Nickname: Brick City
- Location of Clermont, Iowa
- Coordinates: 43°00′06″N 91°39′11″W
- Country: United States
- State: Iowa
- County: Fayette

Area
  - Total: 1.27 sq mi (3.30 km^{2})
  - Land: 1.26 sq mi (3.26 km^{2})
  - Water: 0.012 sq mi (0.03 km^{2})
- Elevation: 850 ft (260 m)

Population (2020)
  - Total: 586
  - Density: 465.0/sq mi (179.54/km^{2})
- Time zone: UTC-6 (Central (CST))
  - Summer (DST): UTC-5 (CDT)
- ZIP code: 52135
- Area code: 563
- FIPS code: 19-14250
- GNIS feature ID: 2393559
- Website: www.clermontia.org

Clermont (/ˈklɛərmɒnt/ KLAIR-mont) is a city in Fayette County, Iowa, United States. The population was 586 at the 2020 census. Clermont is home to Montauk, the mansion of former Iowa governor William Larrabee, along with much historic architecture.

== Geography ==
Clermont is located on the Turkey River.

According to the United States Census Bureau, the city has a total area of 1.23 square miles (3.19 km^{2}), all land.

== Demographics ==
Historical populations
Year	Pop.	±%
1880	553	—
1890	488	−11.8%
1900	513	+5.1%
1910	510	−0.6%
1920	681	+33.5%
1930	631	−7.3%
1940	626	−0.8%
1950	625	−0.2%
1960	570	−8.8%
1970	582	+2.1%
1980	602	+3.4%
1990	523	−13.1%
2000	716	+36.9%
2010	632	−11.7%
2020	586	−7.3%
Source:"U.S. Census website". United States Census Bureau. and Iowa Data Center; Source: U.S. Decennial Census

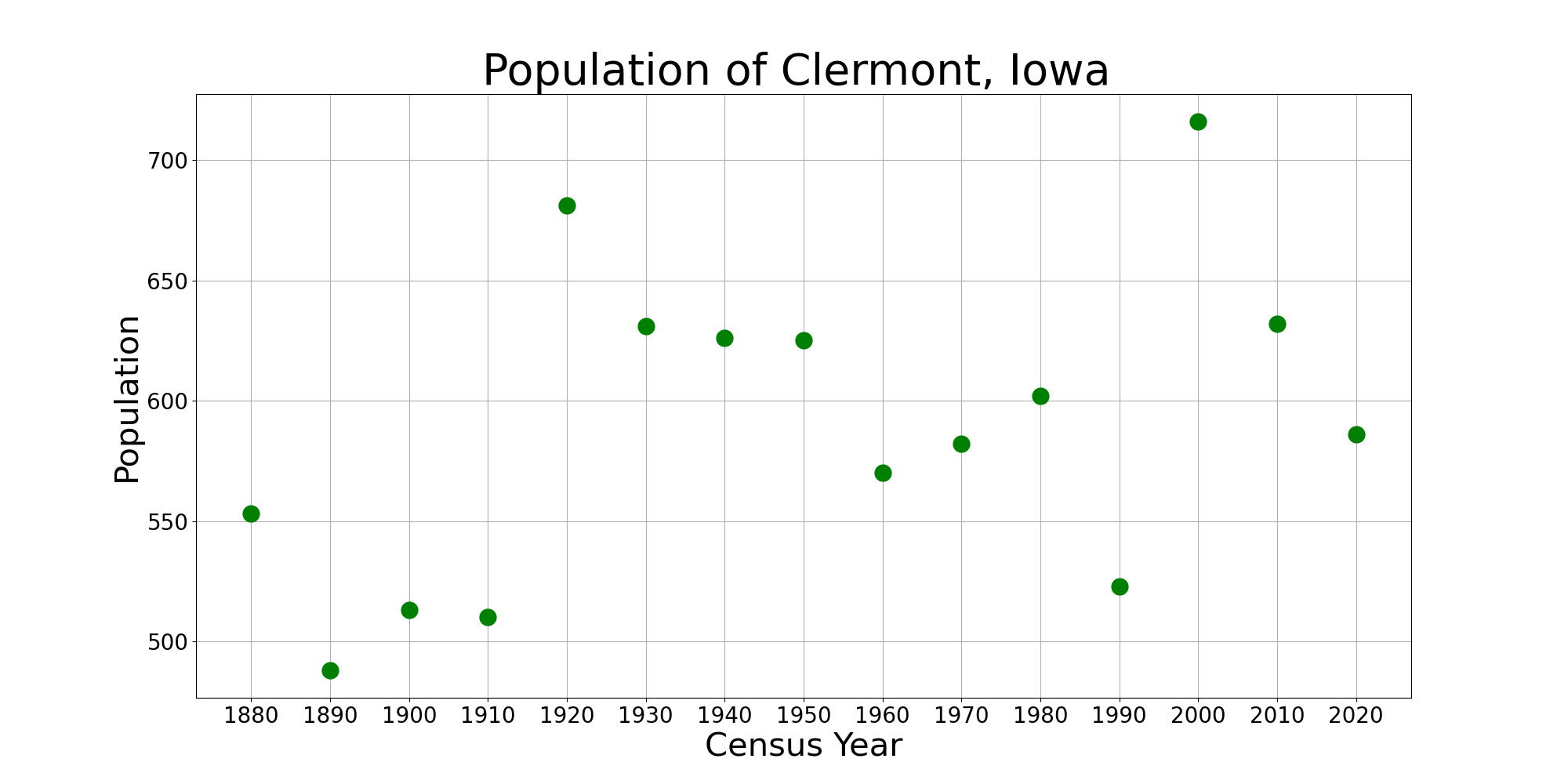
The population of Clermont, Iowa from US census data

=== 2020 census ===
As of the census of 2020, there were 586 people, 243 households, and 156 families residing in the city. The population density was 465.0 inhabitants per square mile (179.5/km^{2}). There were 291 housing units at an average density of 230.9 per square mile (89.2/km^{2}). The racial makeup of the city was 98.6% White, 0.0% Black or African American, 0.3% Native American, 0.2% Asian, 0.0% Pacific Islander, 0.3% from other races and 0.5% from two or more races. Hispanic or Latino persons of any race comprised 1.4% of the population.

Of the 243 households, 21.0% of which had children under the age of 18 living with them, 57.2% were married couples living together, 5.3% were cohabitating couples, 21.8% had a female householder with no spouse or partner present and 15.6% had a male householder with no spouse or partner present. 35.8% of all households were non-families. 30.5% of all households were made up of individuals, 17.7% had someone living alone who was 65 years old or older.

The median age in the city was 46.5 years. 24.6% of the residents were under the age of 20; 4.8% were between the ages of 20 and 24; 18.8% were from 25 and 44; 27.5% were from 45 and 64; and 24.4% were 65 years of age or older. The gender makeup of the city was 46.8% male and 53.2% female.

=== 2010 census ===
As of the census of 2010, there were 632 people, 276 households, and 184 families living in the city. The population density was 513.8 inhabitants per square mile (198.4/km^{2}). There were 310 housing units at an average density of 252.0 per square mile (97.3/km^{2}). The racial makeup of the city was 98.3% White, 1.1% Asian, 0.3% from other races, and 0.3% from two or more races. Hispanic or Latino of any race were 1.4% of the population.

There were 276 households, of which 25.7% had children under the age of 18 living with them, 56.5% were married couples living together, 8.0% had a female householder with no husband present, 2.2% had a male householder with no wife present, and 33.3% were non-families. 27.5% of all households were made up of individuals, and 12% had someone living alone who was 65 years of age or older. The average household size was 2.29 and the average family size was 2.76.

The median age in the city was 45.8 years. 22% of residents were under the age of 18; 7.5% were between the ages of 18 and 24; 19.1% were from 25 to 44; 29.9% were from 45 to 64; and 21.5% were 65 years of age or older. The gender makeup of the city was 47.5% male and 52.5% female.

=== 2000 census ===
As of the census of 2000, there were 716 people, 293 households, and 193 families living in the city. The population density was 653.9 inhabitants per square mile (252.5/km^{2}). There were 333 housing units at an average density of 304.1 per square mile (117.4/km^{2}). The racial makeup of the city was 97.35% White, 0.42% from other races, and 2.23% from two or more races. Hispanic or Latino of any race were 3.35% of the population.

There were 293 households, out of which 28.3% had children under the age of 18 living with them, 55.3% were married couples living together, 8.2% had a female householder with no husband present, and 33.8% were non-families. 28.7% of all households were made up of individuals, and 16.0% had someone living alone who was 65 years of age or older. The average household size was 2.44 and the average family size was 2.95.

In the city, the population was spread out, with 25.6% under the age of 18, 8.0% from 18 to 24, 24.6% from 25 to 44, 24.0% from 45 to 64, and 17.9% who were 65 years of age or older. The median age was 39 years. For every 100 females, there were 96.2 males. For every 100 females age 18 and over, there were 98.9 males.

The median income for a household in the city was $34,712, and the median income for a family was $39,792. Males had a median income of $27,250 versus $18,563 for females. The per capita income for the city was $14,276. About 4.8% of families and 8.1% of the population were below the poverty line, including 11.9% of those under age 18 and 9.6% of those age 65 or over.

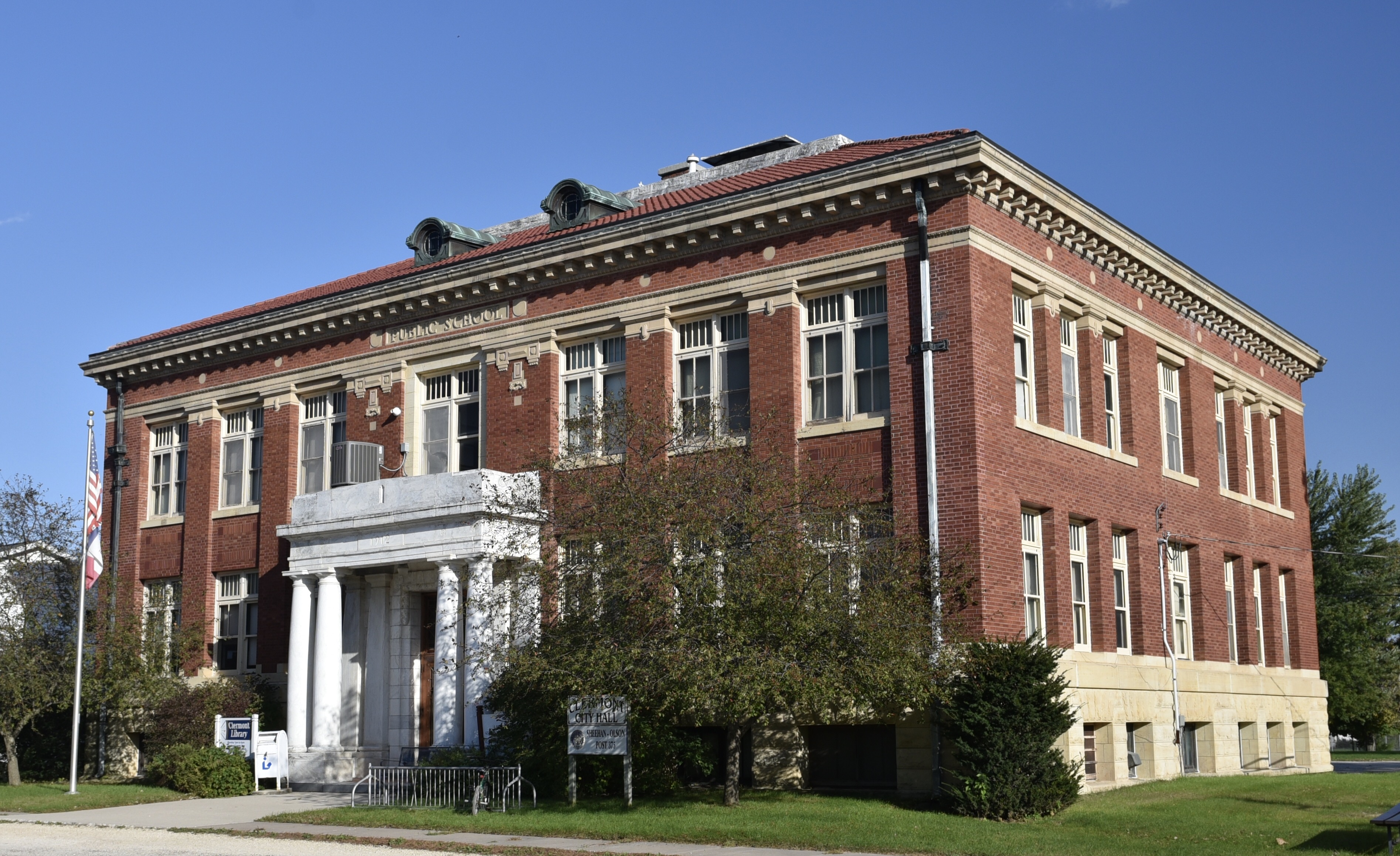
The former Clermont Public School

== Education ==
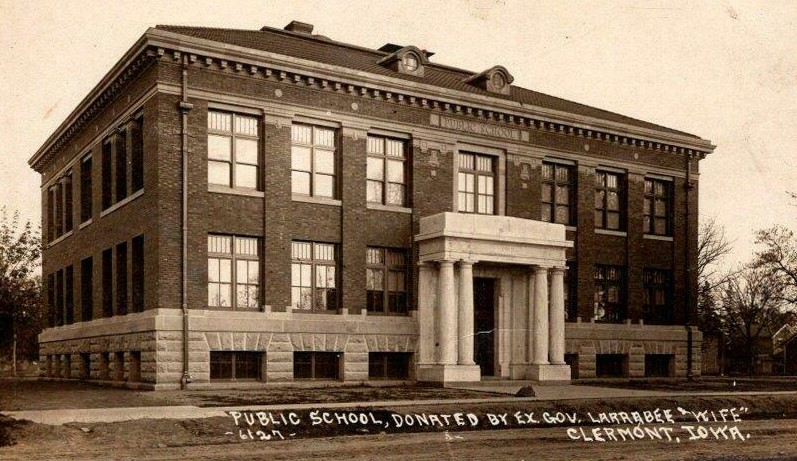
The Clermont Public School was shown on a postcard mailed in 1923.

It is a part of the North Fayette Valley Community School District. It was previously a part of the Valley Community School District, which merged into the North Fayette Valley district on July 1, 2018.

Clermont previously had a school building, the former Clermont Public School, built circa 1913, which closed in 1990. Now named the Larrabee Building, it houses administrative offices of the city government and a library. Jason Clayworth and Charles Litchfield of the Des Moines Register described it as "richly decorated in marble".

== Notable people ==
- George Botsford, American ragtime composer
- David B. Henderson, former Speaker of the United States House of Representatives
- Anna Matilda Larrabee (1842–1931), social leader; First Lady of Iowa
- William Larrabee, former governor of Iowa
- Don Strauch, Arizona mayor and state legislator

== See also ==
Properties listed on the National Register of Historic Places:

- Abraham Lincoln Statue and Park
- Episcopal Church of the Saviour
- Montauk
- Union Sunday School
