= William Larrabee (Iowa politician) =

American politician

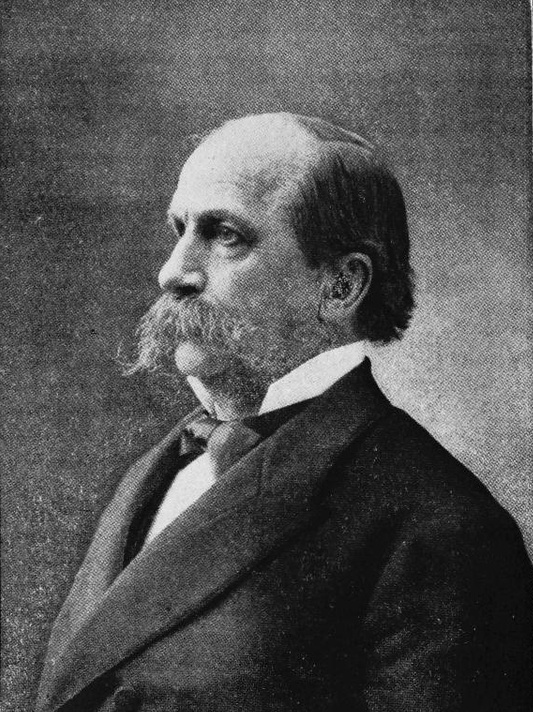

13th Governor of Iowa
- In office January 14, 1886 – February 27, 1890
- Lieutenant: John A.T. Hull
- Preceded by: Buren R. Sherman
- Succeeded by: Horace Boies

Member of the Iowa Senate
- In office January 13, 1868 – January 14, 1886

Personal details
- Born: January 20, 1832 Ledyard, Connecticut, U.S.
- Died: November 16, 1912 (aged 80) Clermont, Iowa, U.S.
- Party: Republican
- Spouse: Anna Matilda Appelman
- Children: 7

William Larrabee (January 20, 1832 – November 16, 1912) was an American Republican politician from Iowa. He served as the 13th governor of Iowa from 1886 until 1890.

== Early life ==
Larrabee was born in Ledyard, Connecticut, to Adam Larrabee (1787–1869), was a West Point graduate and an accomplished soldier, who served with distinction in the War of 1812 and his mother was Hannah (née Lester). He was descended from the French Huguenot family d'Larrabee, who moved to Connecticut in the early 1600's.

Larrabee was the seventh of nine children, and grew up on his father's Connecticut farm. He was educated in local schools until the age of 19. At around age 14, Larrabee lost the eyesight in his right eye after a gun he was holding accidentally discharged. As a result, he was unfit for many careers available to young men of his class in New England. Larrabee chose to become a teacher. In 1853, at age 21, he moved to Iowa following the death of his older brother John who lived in Iowa and had died and an older sister who lived there as well in search of opportunity.

In Iowa, Larrabee taught school for a few years, but soon after his arrival established himself as a successful miller, banker, and farmer in Clermont. Larrabee prospered in business and eventually became one of the biggest landowners in the state. He attempted to enlist at the outbreak of the Civil War, but was rejected on account of his disability.

== Political career ==
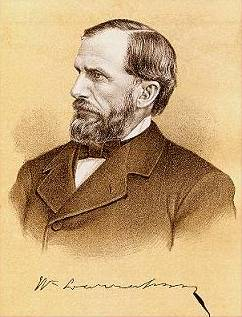
William Larrabee frequently chose to be portrayed in profile with the left side of his face showing because of the disfigurement to the right side

Larrabee entered electoral politics in 1867. He was elected to the Iowa Senate as a Republican, after helping organize the newly created party in Iowa. Larrabee was reelected many times, sometimes without even nominal Democratic opposition. While a legislator, Larrabee served on several committees, and eventually came to chair the influential Ways and Means committee.

He was elected as governor in 1885, succeeding Buren R. Sherman, and served two 2-year terms, from January 14, 1886, until February 27, 1890.

The byline of his first campaign was "a schoolhouse on every hill and no saloons in the valley." In the general election he faced Democrat Charles Whiting, who attempted to portray Larrabee as an unredeemed capitalist and owners of many locals' debts. The election was relatively close, but Larrabee won with 175,504 votes to Whiting's 168,502. During his tenure, he helped to make sure the state stuck to the prohibition of the liquor traffic policy. He also created a state railroad commission and made a new commissioner of the railroad an elected position, to help prevent discrimination in pricing.

After serving two terms as governor, Larrabee retired to Montauk, his family mansion in Clermont. He served in several minor public roles after retiring. At the end of his life he supported Theodore Roosevelt and the Bull Moose faction of the Republican party.

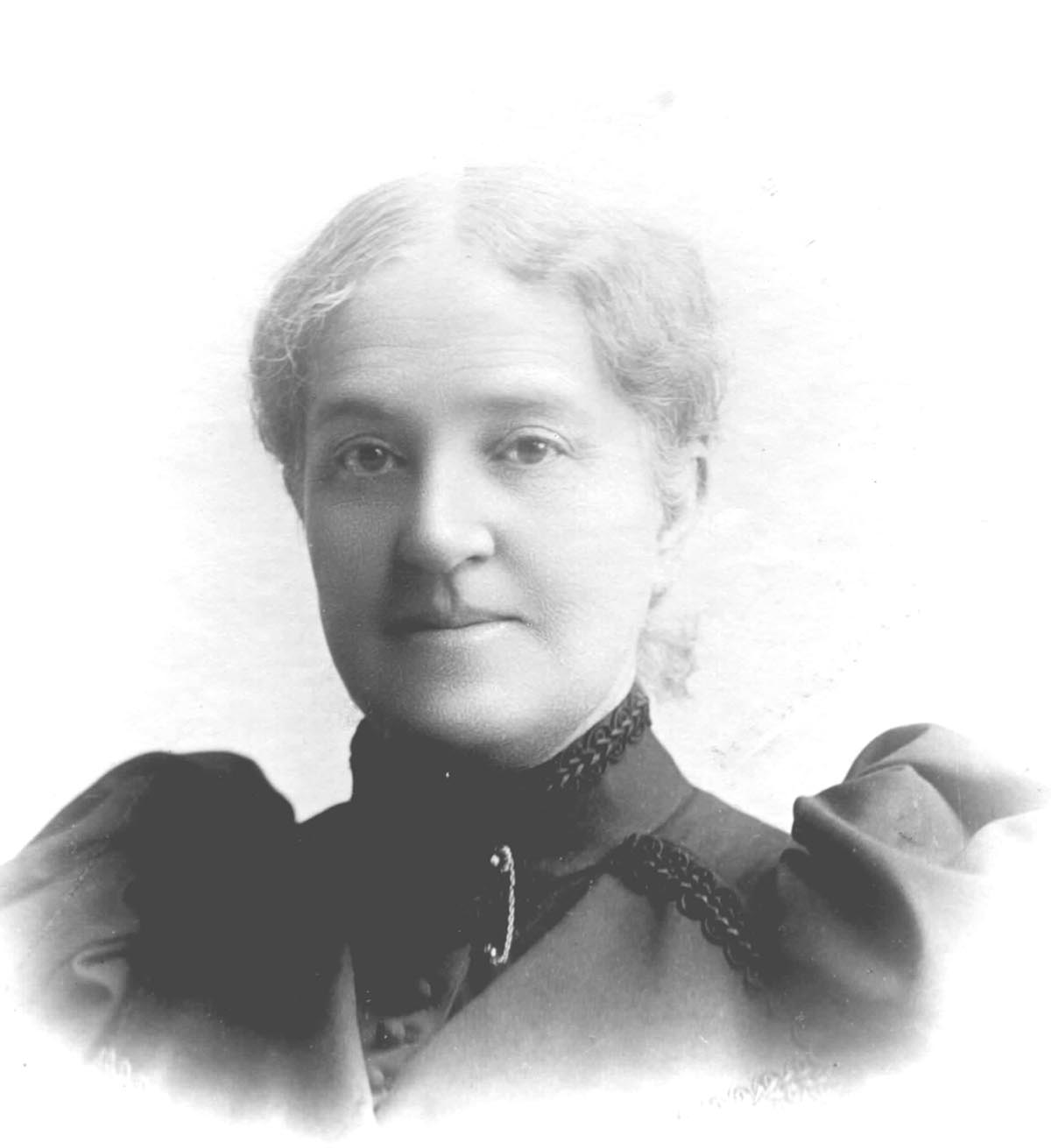
Anna M. Larrabee

== Personal life ==
Larrabee married Anna Matilda Appleman on September 12, 1861 in Clermont. She was the oldest child of Captain Gustavus Adolphus Appelman (1817-1893) and Prudence Anna Appelman (1821-1880) and thus was a direct descendant of John and Priscilla Alden. The Larrabees had seven children: Charles, Augusta, Julia, Anna, William Jr. (Iowa State Representative), Frederic (Iowa State Senator) and Helen. Julia married Don Lathrop Love, future Republican mayor of Lincoln, Nebraska. Helen married Charles Burton Robbins, a future United States Assistant Secretary of War.

Larrabee had a large library and was fond of reading. He also experimented with fruit growing and liked to travel, at one point spending several months in Europe and Palestine in 1873. He and Anna employed French student Mathilde Laigle as a governess from 1895 to 1903. She was their daughter's companion and teacher and she would spend whole days with them when the only language to be spoken was French.

Larrabee was a Methodist.

Larrabee died on November 16, 1912, and was buried at God's Acre Cemetery in Clermont alongside his wife. The following year, James McHose proposed that the northern portion of Kossuth County be split and named Larrabee County. Residents of Kossuth County rejected the proposal in November 1914.

== Sources ==
- "Governor's Information: Iowa Governor William Larrabee". National Governor's Association. January 13, 1983.
- "Governor William Larrabee". Montauk Historical Site - William Larrabee Family Genealogy.

Party political offices
Preceded by Buren R. Sherman	Republican nominee Governor of Iowa; 1885, 1887	Succeeded by Joseph Hutchinson
Political offices
Preceded by Buren R. Sherman	Governor of Iowa; January 14, 1886 – February 27, 1890	Succeeded by Horace Boies
