= List of elections in 1891 =

The following elections occurred in the year 1891.

- 1891 Brazilian presidential election
- March 1891 Chilean parliamentary election
- October 1891 Chilean parliamentary election
- July 1891 Chilean presidential election
- October 1891 Chilean presidential election
- 1891–92 Colombian presidential election
- 1891 Honduran presidential election
- 1891 Hong Kong sanitary board election
- 1891 Liberian general election
- 1891 Salvadoran presidential election

== North America ==
=== Canada ===
- 1891 Canadian federal election
- 1891 North-West Territories general election

=== United States ===
- 1891 New York state election

==== United States Senate ====
- 1890–91 United States Senate elections
- 1890–91 United States Senate elections
- 1891 United States Senate election in Arkansas
- 1891 United States Senate election in California
- 1891 United States Senate special election in California
- 1891 United States Senate election in Colorado
- 1891 United States Senate election in Connecticut
- 1891 United States Senate election in Florida
- 1891 United States Senate election in Georgia
- 1891 United States Senate election in Illinois
- 1891 United States Senate election in Indiana
- 1891 United States Senate election in Kansas
- 1891 United States Senate election in Louisiana
- 1891 United States Senate election in Missouri
- 1891 United States Senate election in Nevada
- 1891 United States Senate election in New Hampshire
- 1891 United States Senate election in New York
- 1891 United States Senate election in North Dakota
- 1891 United States Senate election in Pennsylvania
- 1891 United States Senate election in South Dakota
- 1891 United States Senate election in Virginia
- 1891 United States Senate election in Washington
- 1891 United States Senate election in Wisconsin

==== United States House of Representatives ====
- 1891 United States House of Representatives elections

==== United States gubernatorial ====
- 1891 Iowa gubernatorial election
- 1891 Kentucky gubernatorial election
- 1891 Maryland gubernatorial election
- 1891 Massachusetts gubernatorial election
- 1891 New York gubernatorial election
- 1891 Ohio gubernatorial election
- 1891 Rhode Island gubernatorial election
- 1891 United States gubernatorial elections

==== United States mayoral elections ====
- 1891 Boston mayoral election
- 1891 Chicago mayoral election
- 1891 Philadelphia mayoral election
- 1891 San Diego mayoral election

== Europe ==
- 1891 Cisleithanian legislative election
- 1891 Cypriot legislative election
- 1891 Dutch general election
- 1891 Faroese general election
- 1891 Liechtenstein local elections
- 1891 Norwegian parliamentary election
- 1891 Spanish general election

=== United Kingdom ===
- 1891 Aston Manor by-election
- 1891 Bassetlaw by-election
- 1891 Carlow County by-election
- 1891 Derby by-election
- 1891 Harborough by-election
- 1891 Hartlepool by-election
- 1891 Kilkenny City by-election
- 1891 Lewisham by-election
- 1891 Mid Oxfordshire by-election
- 1891 Northampton by-election
- 1891 North Kilkenny by-election
- 1891 North Sligo by-election
- 1891 Paisley by-election
- 1891 South Molton by-election
- 1891 Stowmarket by-election
- 1891 Walsall by-election
- 1891 Wisbech by-election

== Oceania ==
=== New Zealand ===
- 1891 City of Christchurch by-election
- 1891 Te Aroha by-election

== See also ==
- Category:1891 elections
