= 1891 United States gubernatorial elections =

- November 3, 1891; August 3, 1891 (KY); April 1, 1891 (RI)

7 governorships
	Majority party	Minority party
Party	Democratic	Republican
Seats before	27	17 (Note: John Milton Thayer (R) succeeded Nebraska Governor James E. Boyd (D) who was removed from office by the Nebraska Supreme Court in May 1891. Boyd's citizenship would be upheld by the U.S. Supreme Court and he would be restored to office in February 1892.)
Seats after	25	19
Seat change	▼2	▲2
Seats up	7	0
Seats won	5	2
- Democratic gain Democratic hold Republican gain Republican hold

United States gubernatorial elections were held in 1891, in seven states.

Kentucky and Maryland held their gubernatorial elections in odd numbered years, every 4 years, preceding the United States presidential election year. Massachusetts and Rhode Island both elected their respective governors to a single-year term. They would abandon this practice in 1920 and 1912, respectively. Iowa and Ohio at this time held gubernatorial elections in every odd numbered year.

New York at this time elected its governors to a three-year term. This was the last election in which this was the case. The state switched to two-year terms from the 1894 elections.

In Kentucky, the gubernatorial election was held in August for the last time; the next gubernatorial election would be held on the same day as federal elections.

== Results ==
State	Incumbent	Party	Status	Opposing candidates
Iowa	Horace Boies	Democratic	Re-elected, 49.38%	Hiram C. Wheeler (Republican) 47.43% A. J. Westfall (Populist) 2.97% Isaac T. Gibson (Prohibition) 0.22%
Kentucky (held, 3 August 1891)	Simon Bolivar Buckner	Democratic	Term-limited, Democratic victory	John Y. Brown (Democratic) 49.85% Andrew T. Wood (Republican) 40.14% S. B. Erwin (Populist) 8.86% Josiah Harris (Prohibition) 1.14%
Maryland	Elihu Emory Jackson	Democratic	Retired, Democratic victory	Frank Brown (Democratic) 56.52% William J. Vannort (Republican) 40.82% Edwin Higgins (Prohibition) 2.67%
Massachusetts	William E. Russell	Democratic	Re-elected, 49.12%	Charles Herbert Allen (Republican) 47.11% Charles E. Kimball (Prohibition) 2.79% Henry Winn (Populist) 0.54% Harry W. Robinson (Socialist Labor) 0.44%
New York	David B. Hill	Democratic	Retired to take up seat in the U.S. Senate, Democratic victory	Roswell P. Flower (Democratic) 50.13% Jacob Sloat Fassett (Republican) 46.00% Joseph W. Bruce (Prohibition) 2.61% Daniel De Leon (Socialist Labor) 1.26%
Ohio	James E. Campbell	Democratic	Defeated, 45.90%	William McKinley (Republican) 48.61% John Seitz (Populist) 2.95% John J. Ashenhurst (Prohibition) 2.54%
Rhode Island (held, 1 April 1891)	John W. Davis	Democratic	Defeated, 48.95% (Note: Since no candidate received 50% of the vote, the state legislature decided the election. Ladd was elected.)	Herbert W. Ladd (Republican) 46.19% John H. Larry (Prohibition) 4.02% Franklin E. Burton (National) 0.85%

== Bibliography ==
- Glashan, Roy R. (1979). American Governors and Gubernatorial Elections, 1775-1978. Meckler Books. ISBN 0-930466-17-9.
- Gubernatorial Elections, 1787-1997. Washington, D.C.: Congressional Quarterly Inc. 1998. ISBN 1-56802-396-0.
- Dubin, Michael J. (2014). United States Gubernatorial Elections, 1861-1911: The Official Results by State and County. Jefferson, North Carolina: McFarland. ISBN 978-0-7864-4722-0.
- The World Almanac, 1892. New York, NY: The Press Publishing Co. 1892.
- McPherson, Edward, ed. (1892). The Tribune Almanac and Political Register for 1892. New York, NY: The Tribune Association.
