= 1889 United States gubernatorial elections =

- November 5, 1889; April 3, 1889 (RI); October 1, 1889 (MT, ND, SD, WA)

11 governorships
	Majority party	Minority party
Party	Democratic	Republican
Seats before	19	19
Seats after	22	20
Seat change	▲3	▲1
Seats up	3	4
Seats won	6	5
- Democratic gain Democratic hold Republican gain Republican hold

United States gubernatorial elections were held in 1889, in eleven states.

Virginia holds its gubernatorial elections in odd numbered years, every 4 years, following the United States presidential election year. New Jersey at this time held gubernatorial elections every 3 years. It abandoned this practice in 1949. Massachusetts and Rhode Island both elected their respective governors to a single-year term. They abandoned this practice in 1920 and 1912, respectively. Iowa and Ohio at this time held gubernatorial elections in every odd numbered year.

Mississippi at this time held its gubernatorial elections in odd numbered years, every 4 years, following the United States presidential election year. This was the last election in which this was the case. Mississippi switched to four-year terms with elections in the year preceding the presidential election year, starting with the 1895 elections.

Montana, North Dakota, South Dakota, and Washington held their first gubernatorial elections on achieving statehood. Each of these states held early elections on October 1, 1889.

== Results ==
State	Incumbent	Party	Status	Opposing candidates
Iowa	William Larrabee	Republican	Lost re-nomination, Democratic victory	Horace Boies (Democratic) 49.90% Joseph Hutchinson (Republican) 48.08% S. B. Downing (Union Labor) 1.60% Malcolm Smith (Prohibition) 0.38% Elias Doty (Greenback) 0.01% Scattering 0.02%
Massachusetts	Oliver Ames	Republican	Retired, Republican victory	John Q. A. Brackett (Republican) 48.40% William E. Russell (Democratic) 45.83% John Blackmer (Prohibition) 5.74% Scattering 0.02%
Mississippi	Robert Lowry	Democratic	Term-limited, Democratic victory	John Marshall Stone (Democratic) 99.98% Scattering 0.02%
Montana (held, 1 October 1889)	New state			Joseph Toole (Democratic) 50.75% Thomas C. Power (Republican) 49.25%
New Jersey	Robert Stockton Green	Democratic	Term-limited, Democratic victory	Leon Abbett (Democratic) 51.37% Edward Burd Grubb Jr. (Republican) 46.08% George La Monte (Prohibition) 2.55%
North Dakota (held, 1 October 1889)	New state			John Miller (Republican) 66.58% William N. Roach (Democratic) 33.42%
Ohio	Joseph B. Foraker	Republican	Defeated, 47.52%	James E. Campbell (Democratic) 48.93% John B. Helwig (Prohibition) 3.42% John H. Rhodes (Union Labor) 0.14%
Rhode Island (held, 3 April 1889)	Royal C. Taft	Republican	Declined re-nomination, Republican victory; since no candidate received an outright majority, the result was decided by the Rhode Island General Assembly	John W. Davis (Democratic) 49.38% Herbert W. Ladd (Republican) 39.13% (Note: Since no candidate received 50% of the vote, the state legislature decided the election. Ladd was elected.); James H. Chace (Law Enforcement) 8.34% Harrison H. Richardson (Prohibition) 3.12% Scattering 0.02%
South Dakota (held, 1 October 1889)	New state			Arthur C. Mellette (Republican) 69.36% P. F. McClure (Democratic) 30.64%
Virginia	Fitzhugh Lee	Democratic	Term-limited, Democratic victory	Philip W. McKinney (Democratic) 57.33% William Mahone (Republican) 42.33% Thomas E. Taylor (Prohibition) 0.31% Scattering 0.03% (Note: The result given (McKinney 164,212, Mahone 121,257, Taylor 897, Scattering 81) is that declared in joint assembly on December 7, 1889 and recorded in the journals of the two houses of the Virginia General Assembly. However, the various contemporary and later sources give three different results, as follows: 1. McKinney 162,654, Mahone 120,477, Taylor 897; 2. McKinney 163,180, Mahone 121,240, Taylor 897; 3. McKinney 164,212, Mahone 121,257, Taylor 897.; Assessment is hindered because the sources which include tabulations of the city and county results do not agree, and the sums of the individual results in no case agree with the totals. It is most likely that the actual result was McKinney 163,180, Mahone 121,240, Taylor 897.)
Washington (held, 1 October 1889)	New state			Elisha Peyre Ferry (Republican) 57.68% Eugene Semple (Democratic) 42.32%

== Bibliography ==
- Glashan, Roy R. (1979). American Governors and Gubernatorial Elections, 1775-1978. Meckler Books. ISBN 0-930466-17-9.
- Gubernatorial Elections, 1787-1997. Washington, D.C.: Congressional Quarterly Inc. 1998. ISBN 1-56802-396-0.
- Dubin, Michael J. (2014). United States Gubernatorial Elections, 1861-1911: The Official Results by State and County. Jefferson, North Carolina: McFarland. ISBN 978-0-7864-4722-0.
- The World Almanac, 1890. New York, NY: Press Publishing Co. 1890.
- McPherson, Edward, ed. (1890). The Tribune Almanac and Political Register for 1890. New York, NY: The Tribune Association.
- J. A. Piper, Secretary of State (1895). Roster of Soldiers, Sailors and Marines of the War of 1812, the Mexican War, and the War of the Rebellion, Residing in Nebraska, June 1, 1895. York, Nebraska: Nebraska Newspaper Union.
