= George Wetmore =

George Wetmore may refer to:

- George P. Wetmore, governor of, and senator from, Rhode Island
- George Walter Wetmore, member of the Florida House of Representatives
