= Riverside Cemetery (Pawtucket, Rhode Island) =

Historic cemetery in Rhode Island, US

- U.S. National Register of Historic Places
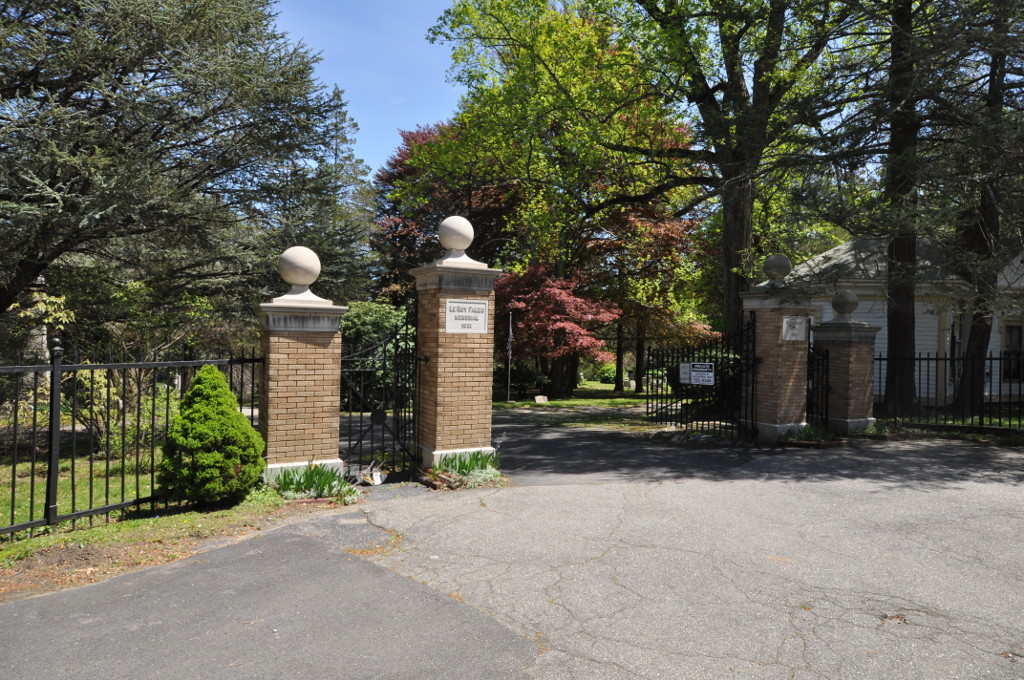

- Location within Rhode Island Location within the United States
- Location: Pleasant St., Pawtucket, Rhode Island
- Coordinates: 41°51′35″N 71°22′57″W
- Area: 34 acres (14 ha)
- Built: 1874
- Architect: Dexter, Edward & Walter; R. Smith Mowry
- MPS: Pawtucket MRA
- NRHP reference No.: 83003853
- Added to NRHP: November 18, 1983

Riverside Cemetery is an historic cemetery at 752 Pleasant Street in Pawtucket, Rhode Island. It occupies a parcel of land about 34 acres (14 ha) in size between Pleasant Street and the Seekonk River, and just north of the much larger Swan Point Cemetery in neighboring Providence. The cemetery was established in 1874, and is Pawtucket's instance of a rural cemetery.

The cemetery's creation was championed by John W. Davis (1826–1907), a local politician who later served two terms as Governor of Rhode Island, and was for many years the cemetery's resident manager, living in the cemetery manager's house, which was built around the time of the cemetery's founding. Davis himself is buried there and the cemetery has been run by his descendants.

The cemetery was listed on the National Register of Historic Places in 1983.

== See also ==
- National Register of Historic Places listings in Pawtucket, Rhode Island
