= 1890 Rhode Island gubernatorial election =

- April 2, 1890
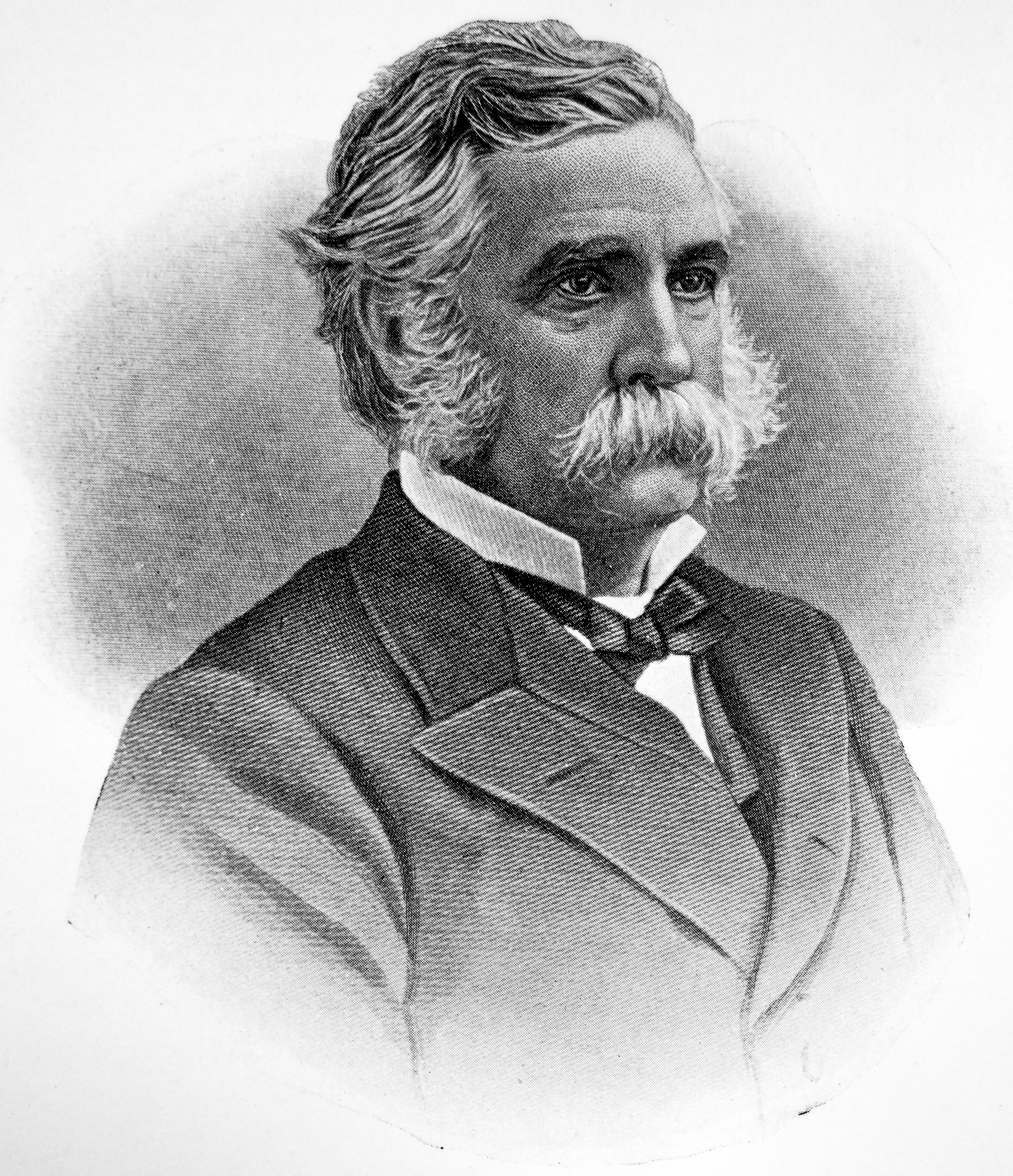

Nominee	John W. Davis	Herbert W. Ladd
Party	Democratic	Republican
Popular vote	20,548	18,988
Percentage	48.76%	45.06%
- Davis: 40–50% 50–60% Ladd: 40–50% 50–60% 60–70% 70–80%
Governor before election
Herbert W. Ladd
Republican
Elected Governor
John W. Davis
Democratic

The 1890 Rhode Island gubernatorial election was held on April 2, 1890. Democratic nominee John W. Davis defeated incumbent Republican Herbert W. Ladd with 48.76% of the vote.

== General election ==
=== Candidates ===
Major party candidates

- John W. Davis, Democratic
- Herbert W. Ladd, Republican

Other candidates

- John H. Larry, Prohibition
- Arnold B. Chace, Union

=== Results ===
1890 Rhode Island gubernatorial election
Party	Candidate	Votes	%	±%
Democratic	John W. Davis	20,548	48.76%	
Republican	Herbert W. Ladd (incumbent)	18,988	45.06%	
Prohibition	John H. Larry	1,820	4.32%	
Independent	Arnold B. Chace	752	1.78%	
Majority		1,560		
Turnout				
Democratic gain from Republican		Swing		
