= 1887 Rhode Island gubernatorial election =

- April 6, 1887
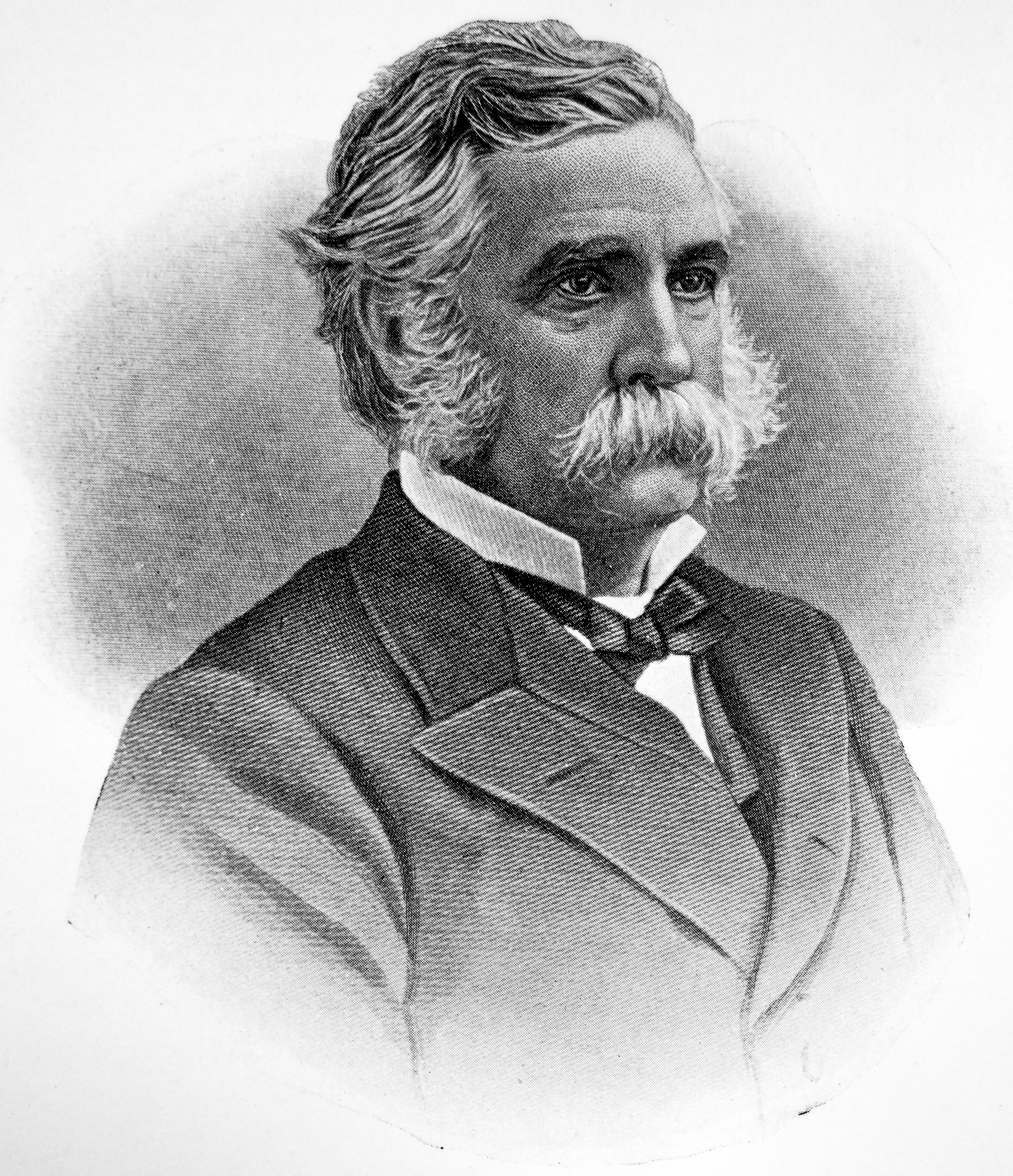

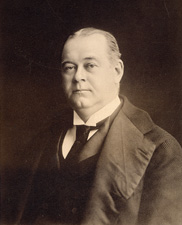

Nominee	John W. Davis	George P. Wetmore	Thomas H. Peabody
Party	Democratic	Republican	Prohibition
Popular vote	18,095	15,111	1,895
Percentage	51.50%	43.01%	5.39%
- Davis: 40–50% 50–60% 70–80% Wetmore: 40–50% 50–60% 60–70% 70–80% 80-90%
Governor before election
George P. Wetmore
Republican
Elected Governor
John W. Davis
Democratic

The 1887 Rhode Island gubernatorial election was held on April 6, 1887. Democratic nominee John W. Davis defeated incumbent Republican George P. Wetmore with 51.50% of the vote.

== General election ==
=== Candidates ===
Major party candidates

- John W. Davis, Democratic
- George P. Wetmore, Republican

Other candidates

- Thomas H. Peabody, Prohibition

=== Results ===
1887 Rhode Island gubernatorial election
Party	Candidate	Votes	%	±%
Democratic	John W. Davis	18,095	51.50%	
Republican	George P. Wetmore (incumbent)	15,111	43.01%	
Prohibition	Thomas H. Peabody	1,895	5.39%	
Majority		2,984		
Turnout				
Democratic gain from Republican		Swing		
