= 1889 Rhode Island gubernatorial election =

- April 3, 1889

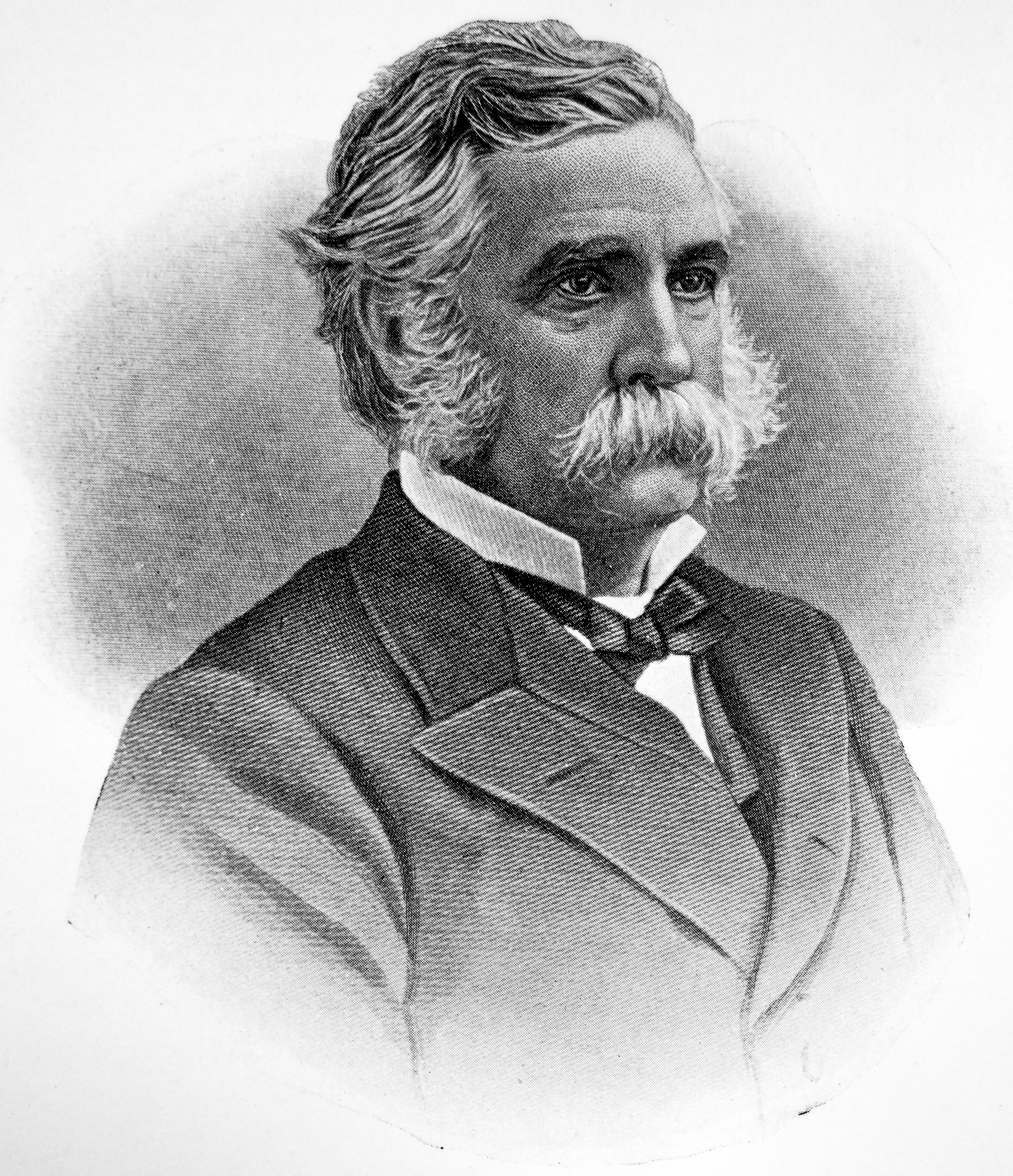

Nominee	Herbert W. Ladd	John W. Davis	James Chace
Party	Republican	Democratic	Independent
Popular vote	16,870	21,289	3,596
Percentage	39.13%	49.38%	8.34%
- Ladd: 40–50% 50–60% 60–70% Davis: 30–40% 40–50% 50–60%
Governor before election
Royal C. Taft
Democratic
Elected Governor
Herbert W. Ladd
Republican

The 1889 Rhode Island gubernatorial election was held on April 3, 1889. Democratic nominee John W. Davis received 49.38% of the vote and the Republican nominee Herbert W. Ladd 39.13%. With no candidate attaining a majority of the vote it was decided by the Rhode Island General Assembly. In the same election, the Republican Party had won a small majority in the legislature and selected Ladd as governor.

== General election ==
=== Candidates ===
Major party candidates

- Herbert W. Ladd, Republican
- John W. Davis, Democratic

Other candidates

- James Chace, Independent
- Harrison H. Richardson, Prohibition

=== Results ===
1889 Rhode Island gubernatorial election
Party	Candidate	Votes	%	±%
Republican	Herbert W. Ladd	16,870	39.13%	
Democratic	John W. Davis	21,289	49.38%	
Independent	James Chace	3,596	8.34%	
Prohibition	Harrison H. Richardson	1,346	3.12%	
Majority		4,419		
Turnout				
Republican hold		Swing		
