= Andrew T. Wood =

American lawyer and politician (1834 – 1915)

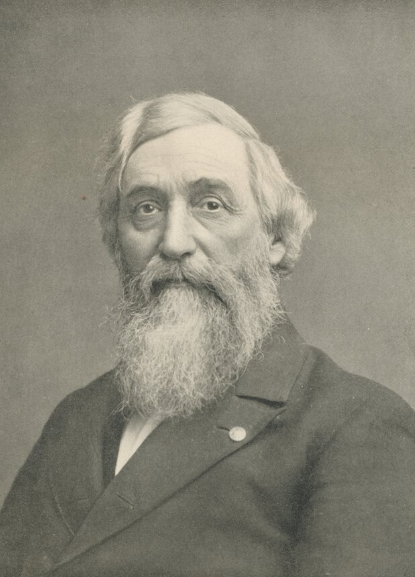
- Wood in 1897
- Born: November 18, 1834; Fleming County, Kentucky, U.S.
- Died: February 3, 1915 (aged 80); Mount Sterling, Kentucky, U.S.
- Burial place: Machpelah Cemetery; Mount Sterling, Kentucky, U.S.
- Spouse: Matilda Pickrell (m. 1852)
- Children: 10
- Military career
- Allegiance: Union army
- Branch: United States Army
- Service years: 1862–1863
- Rank: Major
- Units: 10th Kentucky Cavalry Regiment; 71st Volunteer Infantry
- Conflicts: American Civil War

Signature
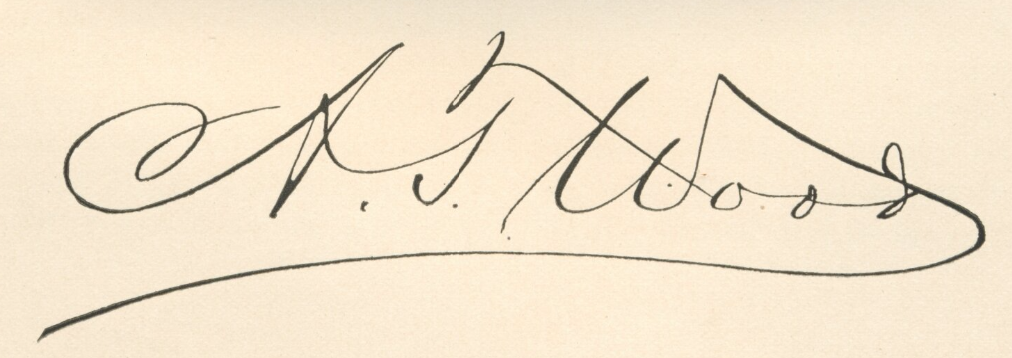

Major Andrew Thompson Wood (November 18, 1834 – February 3, 1915) was an American lawyer and politician from the Commonwealth of Kentucky. A Republican, he had a lengthy career in Kentucky politics, including a run for the United States House of Representatives in 1872, a failed bid for Attorney General of Kentucky in 1887, and a failed bid for Governor of Kentucky in 1891.

Born in rural Fleming County, Kentucky, Wood received a common education, and became a stagecoach driver. Later, he became a school teacher in the schools of Fleming County, before he enlisted as a Union soldier, and eventually climbed to the rank of major. After the war, he studied law under J.S. Dury and Thomas Turner, and was admitted to the bar in 1873.

As a Republican in a heavily Democratic state, Wood found little success in his political career. He suffered a failed bid for a seat in the United States House of Representatives in 1872, a failed bid for attorney general of Kentucky in 1887, and a failed bid for governor of Kentucky in 1891. He also faced many threats from the Ku Klux Klan to kill him and burn his home. In 1897, he was appointed a United States senator by governor William O. Bradley to fill the vacancy caused by failure of the Kentucky General Assembly to elect a successor to J. C. S. Blackburn, but his appointment was ignored in the senate, and they instead chose William J. Deboe to succeed Blackburn. In 1904, Wood was appointed United States pension agent from Kentucky, and served until 1915. Wood died on February 3, 1915, after several years of failing health.

== Biography ==
=== Early life ===
Andrew Thompson Wood was born on November 18, 1834, near the city of Flemingsburg, Kentucky, in Fleming County, Kentucky, to Henry S. Wood and Flavilla Weaver. He attended the common schools of Fleming County. He first assisted in the management of the family farm, and at the age of 17, he was employed as stagecoach driver, and eventually owned and operated his own stagecoat between Mount Sterling, Kentucky and Paris, Kentucky. In 1860, he was a teacher in the schools of Fleming County, and taught school until he enlisted to serve in the American Civil War. Wood married Matilda Pickrell on October 28, 1852, they raised a large family of 10 children.

=== Civil war service ===
On August 5, 1862, Wood enlisted in the 10th Kentucky Cavalry Regiment, as a Union soldier. He served as a recruiting officer for a period of time, and eventually climbed to the rank of lieutenant . He was with the regiment until it was mustered out of service in 1863. Later, he was appointed a major in the 71st Kentucky Infantry Regiment, and served until the end of the war.

=== Career ===
After the war, Wood began studying law under J.S. Dury in Mount Sterling. Dury died in 1867, and Wood began studying under a new mentor, Thomas Turner. Wood finished his studies under Turner, and was admitted to the bar in 1873. For three years, he practiced law alone in Mount Sterling, before he and Turner formed a partnership, which lasted until 1880. After this, he practiced alone for three years, before he formed a second partnership with B.F. Dury in 1883. His partnership with Dury lasted until 1893, when it was dissolved.

=== Political career ===
After the civil war, Wood served as a safeguard of the Republican party in eastern Kentucky, at a time in which many communities were tormented by the Ku Klux Klan, and he faced many threats to kill him and burn his home. In 1872, Wood ran for United States House of Representatives, but lost. In 1876, he was a Republican elector from Kentucky. In 1880, he was a delegate to the 1880 Republican National Convention, in which he voted for the nomination of Ulysses S. Grant for a third term as president of the United States. From 1884 to 1886, he served as city attorney of Mount Sterling. In 1887, he ran for Attorney General of Kentucky, but lost.

==== 1891 Kentucky gubernatorial election ====
In 1891, Wood was chosen as the Republican nominee for governor of Kentucky. His opponent was John Y. Brown, a former U.S. Congressman. Woods campaign was based on endorsement of the new constitution of Kentucky. Wood accused Brown of siding with monopolists and the Louisville and Nashville Railroad. Wood also heavily criticized Brown for not voicing his opinion on the new constitution. When Brown eventually spoke out in support of the new constitution, Wood continued his attacks on Brown.

Both Democrats and Republicans were concerned about the presence of S. Brewer Erwin, nominee of the newly formed Populist Party, in the race; he enjoyed strong support for a third-party candidate, despite the fact that many believed his party's platform was too radical.

Brown defeated Wood taking 144,168 votes, Wood received 116,087 votes, Erwin received 25,631 votes, and a prohibition candidate received 3,292 votes.

=== Later career ===
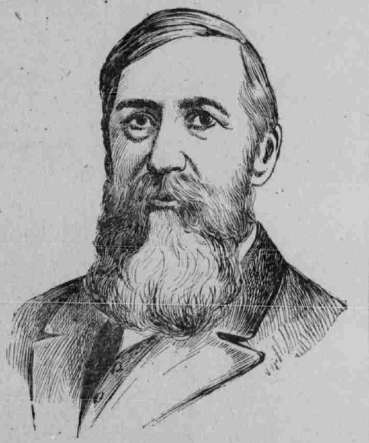
Wood in 1901

After the election, Wood continued his law practice in Mount Sterling for a couple of years. On March 5, 1897, he was appointed to a vacant seat in the United States senate by governor William O. Bradly to fill the vacancy caused by failure of the Kentucky General Assembly to elect a successor to Joseph Clay Stiles Blackburn. His credentials were presented to the senate on March 10, but his appointment was ignored by the senate, and William J. Deboe was duly elected to succeed Blackburn.

In 1904, Wood was appointed a United States pension agent, to fill a vacant seat. He served in this role for four years and was reappointed in 1908. He served for another four years until 1912.

=== Later life and death ===
In 1913, Woods wife Matilda fell and broke her hip, and died shortly thereafter. After the death of his wife, Woods health went into a state of decline, until his death on February 3, 1915, at his home in Mount Sterling, at the age of 80. He was buried at Machpelah Cemetery in Mount Sterling.

=== Electoral history ===
1891 Kentucky gubernatorial election
Party	Candidate	Votes	%
Democratic	John Y. Brown	144,168	49.85%
Republican	Andrew T. Wood	116,087	40.14%
Populist	S. Brewer Erwin	25,631	8.86%
Prohibition	Josiah Harris	3,293	1.14%

Party political offices
Preceded by William O. Bradley	Republican nominee for Governor of Kentucky; 1891	Succeeded by William O. Bradley
