= 1888 Rhode Island gubernatorial election =

- April 4, 1888

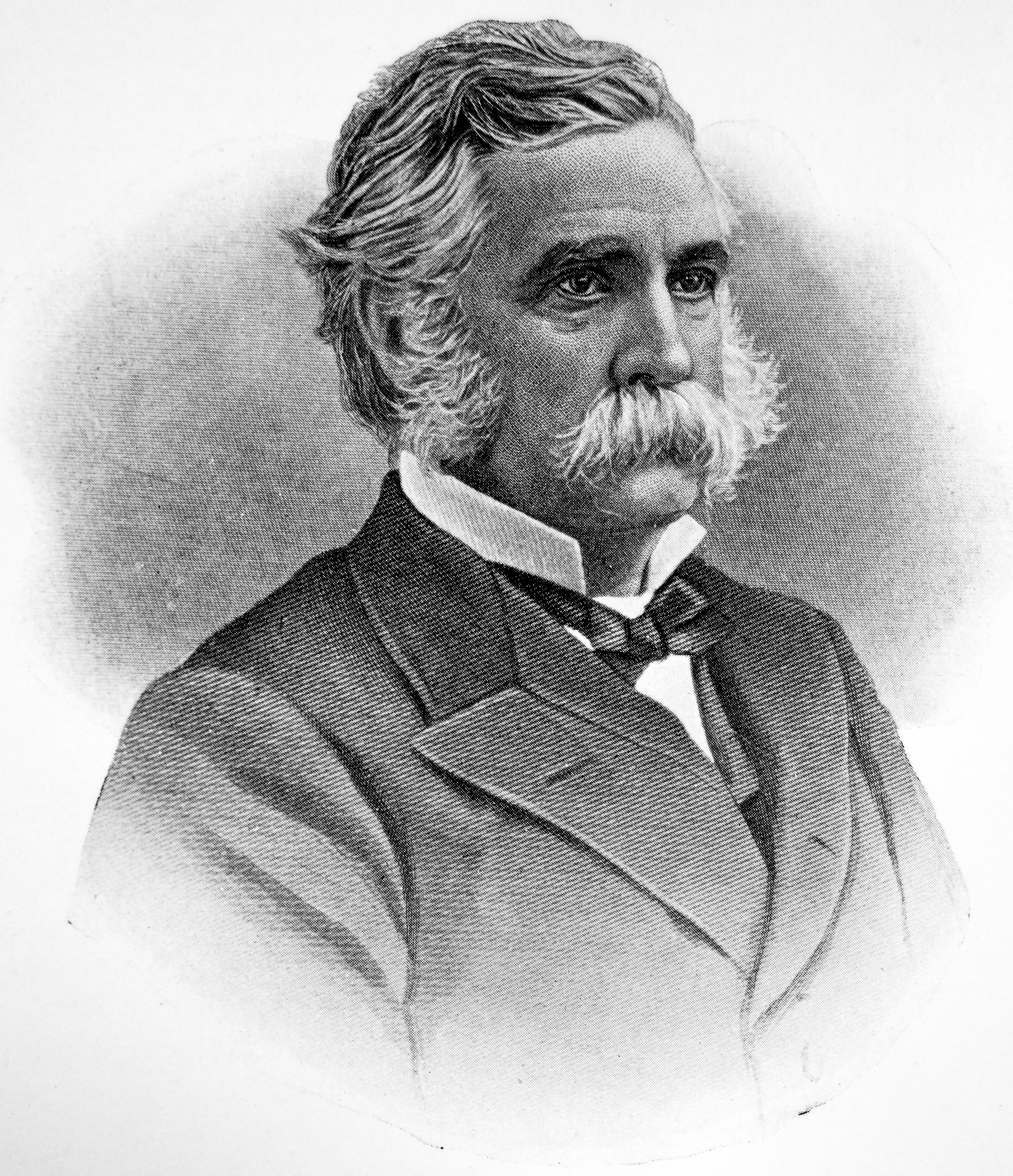
Nominee	Royal C. Taft	John W. Davis
Party	Republican	Democratic
Popular vote	20,744	17,556
Percentage	52.33%	44.29%
- Taft: 40–50% 50–60% 60–70% 70–80% 80-90% Davis: 40–50% 50–60% 60–70%
Governor before election
John W. Davis
Democratic
Elected Governor
Royal C. Taft
Republican

The 1888 Rhode Island gubernatorial election was held on April 4, 1888. Republican nominee Royal C. Taft defeated Democratic incumbent John W. Davis with 52.33% of the vote.

== General election ==
=== Candidates ===
Major party candidates

- Royal C. Taft, Republican
- John W. Davis, Democratic

Other candidates

- George W. Gould, Prohibition

=== Results ===
1888 Rhode Island gubernatorial election
Party	Candidate	Votes	%	±%
Republican	Royal C. Taft	20,744	52.33%	
Democratic	John W. Davis (incumbent)	17,556	44.29%	
Prohibition	George W. Gould	1,325	3.34%	
Majority		3,188		
Turnout				
Republican gain from Democratic		Swing		
