= 1891 Liechtenstein local elections =

- March 1891

Local elections were held in Liechtenstein in March 1891 to elect the municipal councils and the mayors of the eleven municipalities.

== Results ==
=== By municipality ===
Municipality	Elected mayor
Balzers	Christian Brunhart
Eschen	Ludwig Marxer
Gamprin	Johann Georg Näscher
Mauren	Jakob Kaiser
Planken	Gebhard Gantner
Ruggell	Franz Josef Hoop
Schaan	Josef Beck
Schellenberg	Matthäus Wohlwend
Triesen	Wendelin Erni
Triesenberg	Franz Beck
Vaduz	Alois Rheinberger
Source: Liechtensteiner Volksblatt
