= Frank Brown (politician) =

American politician (1846–1920)

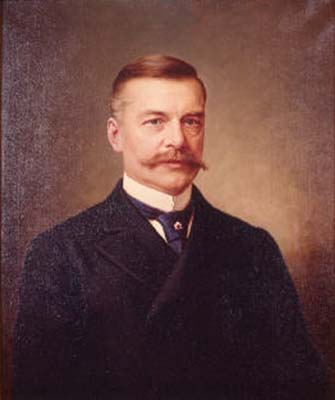

42nd Governor of Maryland
- In office January 13, 1892 – January 8, 1896
- Preceded by: Elihu Emory Jackson
- Succeeded by: Lloyd Lowndes Jr.

Maryland House of Delegates
- In office 1876–1878

Personal details
- Born: August 8, 1846 near Sykesville, Maryland, U.S.
- Died: February 3, 1920 (aged 73) Baltimore, Maryland, U.S.
- Resting place: Green Mount Cemetery
- Party: Democratic
- Spouse: Mary Ridgely Preston (m. 1879; died 1895)
- Children: 2

Frank Brown (August 8, 1846 – February 3, 1920) was an American politician who served as the 42nd governor of Maryland from 1892 to 1896. He also served as a member of the Maryland House of Delegates from 1876 to 1878.

He was a member of the Democratic Party.

== Early life ==
Frank Brown was born on August 8, 1846, near Sykesville, Maryland, to Susan A. (née Bennett) and Stephen T. Cockey Brown. His great-grandfather Abel Brown emigrated from Dumfries, Scotland, to Maryland. His mother's father was a farmer in Carroll County. Brown studied at schools in Carroll, Howard and Baltimore counties. At a young age, Brown worked at R. Sinclair and Company in Baltimore.

== Career ==
In 1870, he became a clerk of one of the state's tobacco warehouses. He worked there until 1876. Brown served as a member of the Maryland House of Delegates from 1876 to 1878. In 1880, Brown became the president of the Maryland State Agricultural and Mechanical Society. He served in that role until 1892. In 1885, he was treasurer of the Democratic State Central Committee. In 1886, Brown succeeded I. Parker Veazey as the postmaster of Baltimore. He served in that role until 1890. While postmaster, sub-stations to the post office were created, a system of post parcel and newspaper boxes was established and carts were first used for mail collection.

In 1887, Brown was one of five candidates for the Democratic gubernatorial nomination, but he lost to Elihu Emory Jackson. In 1891, Brown defeated Republican candidate William J. Vannort in the election for Governor of Maryland. He served as governor from January 13, 1892, to January 8, 1896. In 1892, Brown was a delegate at-large at the 1892 Democratic National Convention. While governor, he helped negotiate with strikers during the 1894 coal strike in Frostburg. He also commuted the capital punishment sentence to life imprisonment for four black men who were convicted of the murder of Dr. Hill of Chestertown. During his tenure, he pushed for the arresting of Coxey's Army. Brown held a non-partisan tax conference to discuss the issue of taxation. A constitutional amendment allowing another judge to serve on the Baltimore City Supreme Court was passed in 1893. Legislation was also passed that banned child labor and the Baltimore College of Dental Surgery was incorporated. He reorganized the Maryland Agricultural College and the tobacco warehouse system. He supported the Springfield Hospital for the Insane.

For the World's Columbian Exposition of 1893 Brown was the president of the board of managers in Maryland. Later in life he served two terms as the president of the Capital Traction Company. Brown later was campaign manager for Thomas G. Hayes's run for mayor of Baltimore in 1899 and J. Barry Mahool's run for mayor of Baltimore in 1906. His last position was the City Collector for Baltimore. In 1905, Brown served as a presidential elector. In 1908, Brown put his name forward as a candidate for the Maryland Senate, but later withdrew his name.

== Personal life ==
Brown married Mary (née Ridgely) Preston, widow of Horatio Preston and daughter of David Ridgely, of Baltimore in 1879. They had two children. She died in 1895. He lived in Carroll County, but after the death of his wife spent more time in Baltimore.

Brown died on February 3, 1920, in Baltimore. He is buried at the Green Mount Cemetery in Baltimore.

Party political offices
Preceded by Elihu Emory Jackson	Democratic nominee for Governor of Maryland; 1891	Succeeded by John E. Hurst
Political offices
Preceded by Elihu Emory Jackson	Governor of Maryland; 1892–1896	Succeeded by Lloyd Lowndes, Jr.
