= 1891 Philadelphia mayoral election =

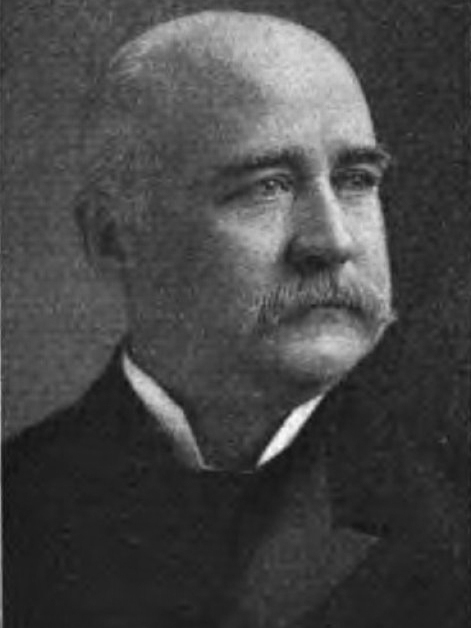

Nominee	Edwin Sydney Stuart	Albert H. Lardner
Party	Republican	Democratic
Popular vote	108,978	69,913
Percentage	60.92%	39.08%
Mayor before election
Edwin Henry Fitler
Republican
Elected mayor
Edwin Sydney Stuart
Republican

The 1891 Philadelphia mayoral election saw the election of Erwin Sydney Stuart.

== Results ==
1891 Philadelphia mayoral election
Party	Candidate	Votes	%
Republican	Edwin Sydney Stuart	108,978	60.92%
Democratic	Albert H. Lardner	69,913	39.08%
Turnout		178,891	
