= 1889 Ohio gubernatorial election =

- November 5, 1889
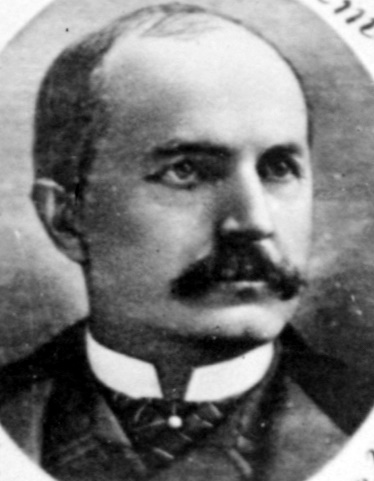

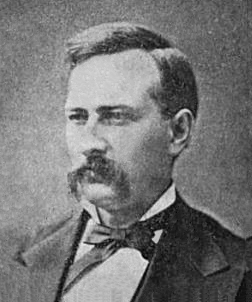
Nominee	James E. Campbell	Joseph B. Foraker
Party	Democratic	Republican
Popular vote	379,423	368,551
Percentage	48.91%	47.51%
- County results Campbell: 40–50% 50–60% 60–70% 70–80% Foraker: 40–50% 50–60% 60–70% 70–80%
Governor before election
Joseph B. Foraker
Republican
Elected Governor
James E. Campbell
Democratic

The 1889 Ohio gubernatorial election was held on November 5, 1889. Democratic nominee James E. Campbell defeated incumbent Republican Joseph B. Foraker with 48.91% of the vote.

== General election ==
=== Candidates ===
Major party candidates

- James E. Campbell, Democratic
- Joseph B. Foraker, Republican

Other candidates

- John B. Helwig, Prohibition
- John H. Rhodes, Union Labor

=== Results ===
1889 Ohio gubernatorial election
Party	Candidate	Votes	%	±%
Democratic	James E. Campbell	379,423	48.91%	
Republican	Joseph B. Foraker (incumbent)	368,551	47.51%	
Prohibition	John B. Helwig	26,504	3.42%	
Labor	John H. Rhodes	1,048	0.14%	
Majority		10,872		
Turnout				
Democratic gain from Republican		Swing		
