= 1891 Cisleithanian legislative election =

Legislative elections were held in Cisleithania in 1891 to elect the members of the eighth Imperial Council. They were the last elections in Cisleithania before the Badeni electoral reform, which drastically increased male suffrage. The German Liberal and Constitutional Party received 32.81% of the vote.

== Electoral system ==
The elections were held according to the curia arrangement that was instituted in 1873 to complement the implementation of direct elections. Voters were classified according to their status and wealth into four curiae:

1. Landowners
2. Trade and industry chambers
3. Large and medium farmers
4. Male city residents who were annually paying at least 5 guilders worth of taxes

== Results ==
Party	Votes	%
German Liberal and Constitutional Party	102,296	33.59
Christian Social and Anti-Semitic Party	38,358	12.60
Polish Conservative Party	35,369	11.62
Young Czech Party	27,852	9.15
Old Czech Party	20,402	6.70
German Clerical and Conservative Party	20,186	6.63
German-National Party	14,700	4.83
Italian Liberal Party	7,913	2.60
Slovenian Candidates	6,589	2.16
German Democratic Party	5,831	1.91
Ruthenian Candidates	5,449	1.79
Social Democratic Party	3,848	1.26
Croatian Candidates	3,348	1.10
Bohemian Conservative Landowners–Moravian Centre Party	1,918	0.63
Polish Democratic Party	1,503	0.49
Serbian Candidates	966	0.32
Italian Clerical Party	941	0.31
German Farmers' Party	838	0.28
Polish Farmers' Party	679	0.22
Romanian Candidates	495	0.16
National Czech Party	441	0.14
Unknown votes	2,489	0.82
Split votes	2,090	0.69
Total	304,501	100.00
Source: ANNO
