= George Walter Wetmore =

American politician (1848–1920)

George Walter Wetmore (December 10, 1848 – January 5, 1920) was a clerk, police officer, and postal carrier who served in the Florida House of Representatives in 1883 and 1885. He represented Duval County. He married Bessie P. Alston, formerly of Cleveland.

His post office was in Jacksonville. He became a lawyer and was a leader against Jacksonville's ordinance segregating its streetcars. He also became Deputy Grand Master of the Most Worshipful Union Grand Lodge of Florida, Prince Hall Affiliation.
