= 10th Kentucky Cavalry Regiment =

- Active: September 8, 1862 - September 17, 1863
- Country: United States
- Allegiance: Union
- Branch: Cavalry
- Engagements: Defense of Cincinnati

The 10th Kentucky Cavalry Regiment was a cavalry regiment that served in the Union Army during the American Civil War.

== Service ==
The 10th Kentucky Cavalry Regiment was organized at Covington, Lexington, and Crab Orchard, Kentucky, from September 8 through November 11, 1862. It mustered in for one year under the command of Colonel Joshua Tevis.

Attached to	Dates
Cavalry, 1st Division, Army of Kentucky, Department of the Ohio	to November 1862
Unattached, Army of Kentucky	November 1862
District of Central Kentucky, Department of the Ohio	to April 1863
2nd Brigade, District Central Kentucky, Department of the Ohio	to June 1863
2nd Brigade, 4th Division, XXIII Corps, Department of the Ohio	to July 1863
2nd Brigade, 1st Division, XXIII Corps	to August 1863
Mt. Sterling, Kentucky, 1st Division, XXIII Corps	to September 1863
2nd Battalion Only
District of Eastern Kentucky	to June 1863
1st Brigade, 4th Division, XXIII Corps	to August 1863

The 10th Kentucky Cavalry mustered out of service on September 17, 1863.

== Detailed service ==
Dates	Actions or events
1862	
until September	Duty about Mt. Sterling, Kentucky, and in the District of Central Kentucky, scouting and operating against guerrillas and protecting that part of the state
September 8	Skirmish near Florence, Kentucky
December 24 to January 1, 1863	Expedition to eastern Tennessee
December 28	Parker's Mills, on Elk Fork
1863	
February 18-March 5	Operations against Cluke's forces
February 22	Coomb's Ferry
February 24	Slate Creek, near Mt. Sterling, and Stoner's Bridge
March 2	Slate Creek, near Mt. Sterling
March 22-April 1	Operations against Pegram
March 22	Mt. Sterling
June 13–23	Operations against Everett's Raid in eastern Kentucky
June 16	Triplett's Bridge, Flemming County
July 25-August 6	Operations against Scott's forces
July 28	Richmond
July 31-August 1	Lancaster and Paint Creek Bridge
August 1	Smith's Shoals, Cumberland River
until September	Duty at Mt. Sterling (2nd Battalion served detached in District of Eastern Kentucky)
July 3–11	Expedition from Beaver Creek into Southwest Virginia
July 7	Gladesville, Virginia

== Casualties ==
The regiment lost a total of 75 men during service; 13 enlisted men killed or mortally wounded, 1 officer and 61 enlisted men died of disease.

== Commanders ==
- Colonel Joshua Tevis
- Colonel Charles J. Walker

== Notable members ==
- Private William Louis Marshall, Company A - brigadier general & Chief of Engineers (1908–1910)

== See also ==
- List of Kentucky Civil War Units
- Kentucky in the Civil War
