= 1891 Faroese general election =

Danish territorial election

Partial general elections were held in the Faroe Islands in 1891 to elect nine of the eighteen elected members of the Løgting. The Danish administrator (Amtmaður) and the local dean (Próstur) were also members, with the administrator serving as the speaker.

== Electoral system ==
Members of the Løgting were elected by first-past-the-post voting, with voters having as many votes as there were seats available in their constituency. Nine of the 18 seats were elected every two years. Voting was restricted to men aged 25 or over who met certain tax-paying criteria.

== Results ==
Constituency	Elected members	Notes
Eysturoy	Peter Huusgaard	
Eysturoy	Oliver Petræus Effersøe	
Eysturoy	Jógvan Poulsen	Re-elected
Eysturoy	Christian Ludvig Weihe	Re-elected
Norðurstreymoy	Ole Jacobsen	Re-elected
Norðurstreymoy	Søren Emil Müller	
Suðurstreymoy	Djóni í Geil	Re-elected
Vágar	Mikkjal Danielsen	Re-elected
Vágar	Daniel Niclasen	
Source: Løgting

=== By constituency ===
Norðurstreymoy
Candidate	Votes	%
Søren Emil Müller	74	44.58
Ole Jacobsen	48	28.92
Olaus Johan Michal Johnsen	42	25.30
Niels Peter Egholm	1	0.60
Joen Peter Gregoriussen	1	0.60
Total	166	100.00
Total votes	83	–
Registered voters/turnout	250	33.20
Source: Løgting
