= 1889 Iowa gubernatorial election =

- November 5, 1889
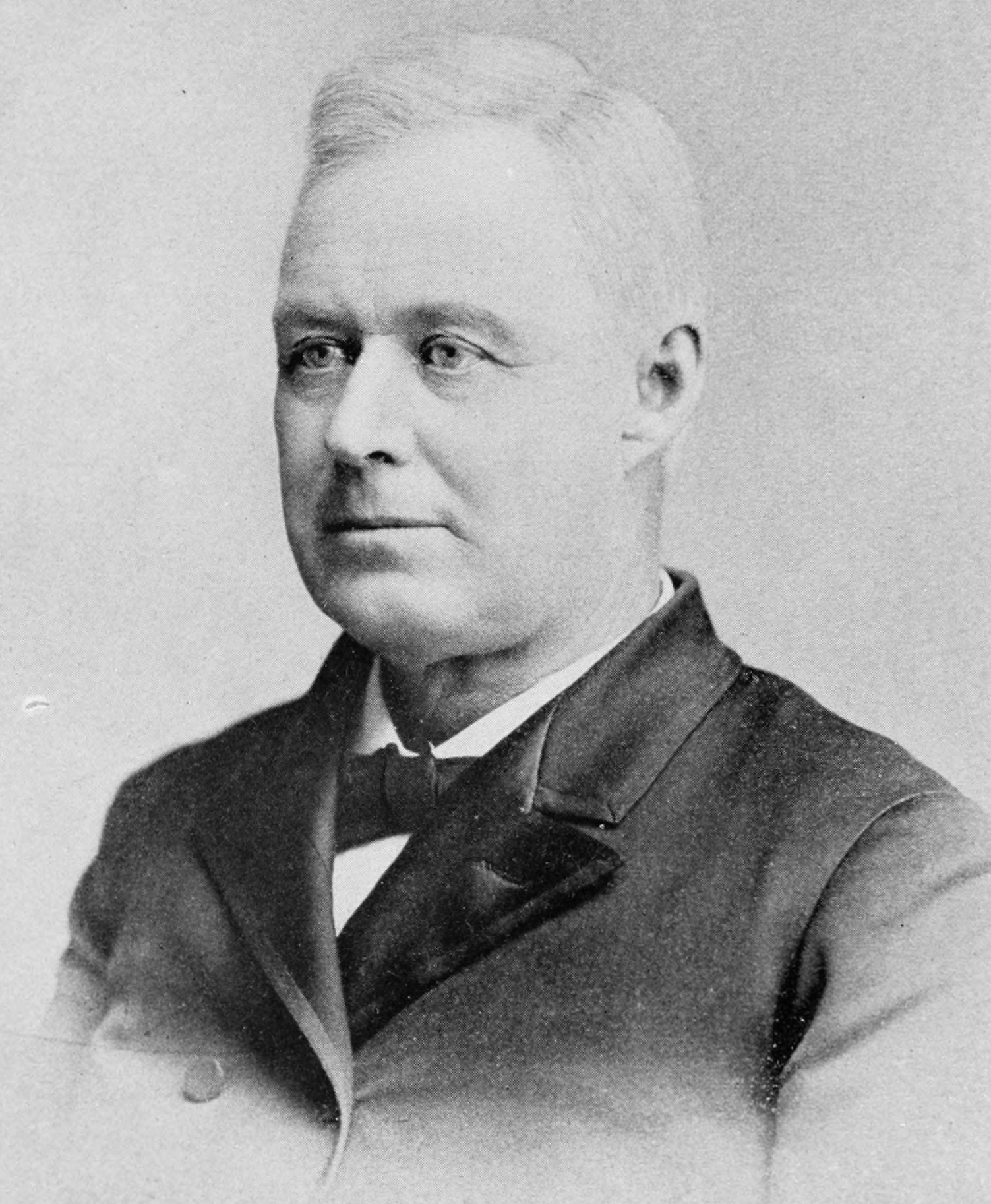

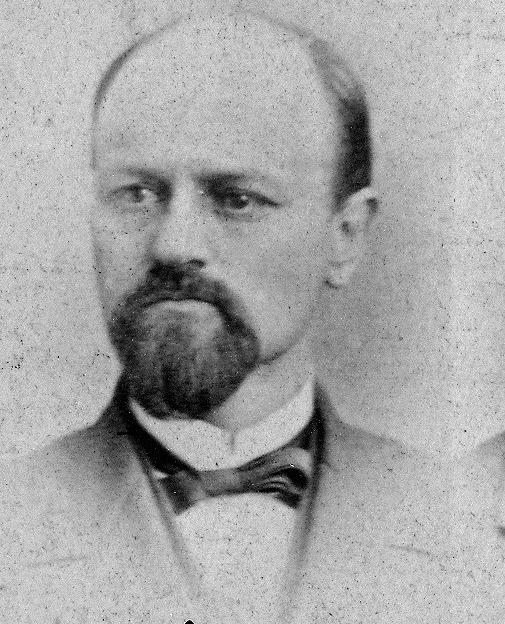
Nominee	Horace Boies	Joseph Hutchison
Party	Democratic	Republican
Popular vote	180,106	173,450
Percentage	49.90%	48.05%
- County results Boies: 40–50% 50–60% 60–70% 70–80% Hutchinson: 40–50% 50–60% 60–70% 70–80%
Governor before election
William Larrabee
Republican
Elected Governor
Horace Boies
Democratic

The 1889 Iowa gubernatorial election was held on November 5, 1889. Democratic nominee Horace Boies defeated Republican nominee Joseph Hutchison with 49.90% of the vote.

== General election ==
=== Candidates ===
Major party candidates

- Horace Boies, Democratic
- Joseph Hutchison, Republican

Other candidates

- S. B. Downing, Union Labor
- Malcolm Smith, Prohibition

=== Results ===
1889 Iowa gubernatorial election
Party	Candidate	Votes	%	±%
Democratic	Horace Boies	180,106	49.90%	
Republican	Joseph Hutchison	173,450	48.05%	
Labor	S. B. Downing	5,773	1.60%	
Prohibition	Malcolm Smith	1,362	0.38%	
Majority		6,656		
Turnout				
Democratic gain from Republican		Swing		
