= George P. Wetmore =

American politician (1846–1921)

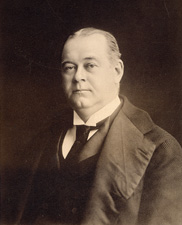

United States Senator from Rhode Island
- In office March 4, 1895 – March 3, 1907
- Preceded by: Nathan F. Dixon III
- Succeeded by: Vacant, failure to elect
- In office January 22, 1908 – March 3, 1913
- Preceded by: Vacant, failure to elect
- Succeeded by: Lebaron B. Colt

37th Governor of Rhode Island
- In office May 26, 1885 – May 29, 1887
- Lieutenant: Lucius B. Darling
- Preceded by: Augustus O. Bourn
- Succeeded by: John W. Davis

Personal details
- Born: August 2, 1846 London, England
- Died: September 11, 1921 (aged 75) Boston, Massachusetts, U.S.
- Resting place: Island Cemetery, Newport, Rhode Island
- Party: Republican
- Spouse: Edith Malvina Keteltas (m. 1869)
- Children: 4
- Parent(s): William Shepard Wetmore; Anstiss Derby Rogers
- Education: Yale College

George Peabody Wetmore (August 2, 1846 – September 11, 1921) was an American politician who was the 37th governor of Rhode Island. He later served as a United States senator for the same state.

== Early life ==
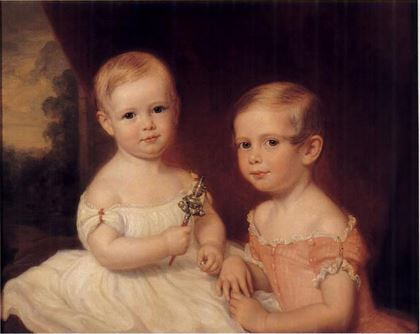
The Wetmore Boys, George and William Jr., by George Peter Alexander Healy

George Peabody Wetmore was born in London, England, during a visit of his parents, William Shepard Wetmore, a wealthy Yankee trader, and Anstiss Derby Rogers, abroad. He received his early education at the private schools of Messrs. Reed and Thurston and of the Rev. William C. Leverett in Newport, Rhode Island. His great-grandfather was politician Benjamin Pickman Jr., who served as a Congressman from Massachusetts. His second great-grandfather was the merchant Elias Hasket Derby, and Derby's wife, Elizabeth Crowninshield Derby, was a member of the prominent Crowninshield family.

He graduated from Yale College in 1867, where he was a member of Skull and Bones. After graduation, he studied for two years at the Columbia Law School. He received the degree of LL.B. in 1869, and was admitted to the bars of Rhode Island and New York the same year, although he never practiced.

== Politics ==
Wetmore had always taken an active interest in politics and in 1880 and 1884 was a presidential elector. He was elected Governor of Rhode Island in 1885 and served two terms, but was defeated for a third term. He was a member of the commission which oversaw construction of the new Rhode Island State House at Providence.

In 1894 he was elected as a Republican to the United States Senate, receiving the unanimous vote of the General Assembly in Senate, House, and joint convention. He was re-elected in 1900 and served from March 4, 1895, to March 3, 1907.

In 1907, he was challenged for his seat by another Republican, industrialist Samuel P. Colt. The three-way contest between Wetmore, Colt and Democrat Robert Hale Ives Goddard resulted in months of deadlocked ballots and a vacant seat in Rhode Island's delegation to the 60th Congress beginning on March 4, 1907. Eventually Colt withdrew, and Wetmore returned to the Senate on January 22, 1908, and served until March 3, 1913. Colt's brother, LeBaron B. Colt, was elected to succeed Wetmore upon Wetmore's retirement from the Senate.

In the Senate, Wetmore was, first, chairman of the Committee on Manufactures, and then chairman of the Joint Committee on the Library for sixteen years. He was also a member of the Appropriations, District of Columbia, Naval Affairs, Public Buildings and Grounds, and other committees. His last term in the Senate ended March 3, 1913.

He had a deep interest in the building up of the Navy and the development of the naval base in Narragansett Bay. He served as chairman of the joint commission appointed by Congress to prepare plans for the completion of the United States Capitol in Washington; was chairman of the first Lincoln Memorial Commission and a member of the commission that erected the National Lincoln Memorial in Washington; and was a member of the Grant Memorial Commission, as well as many others for the erection of statues and memorials. He was greatly interested in the improvement and development of Washington and the District of Columbia on a definite artistic plan, and was particularly identified with the legislation creating the National Commission of Fine Arts.

=== Cultural work ===
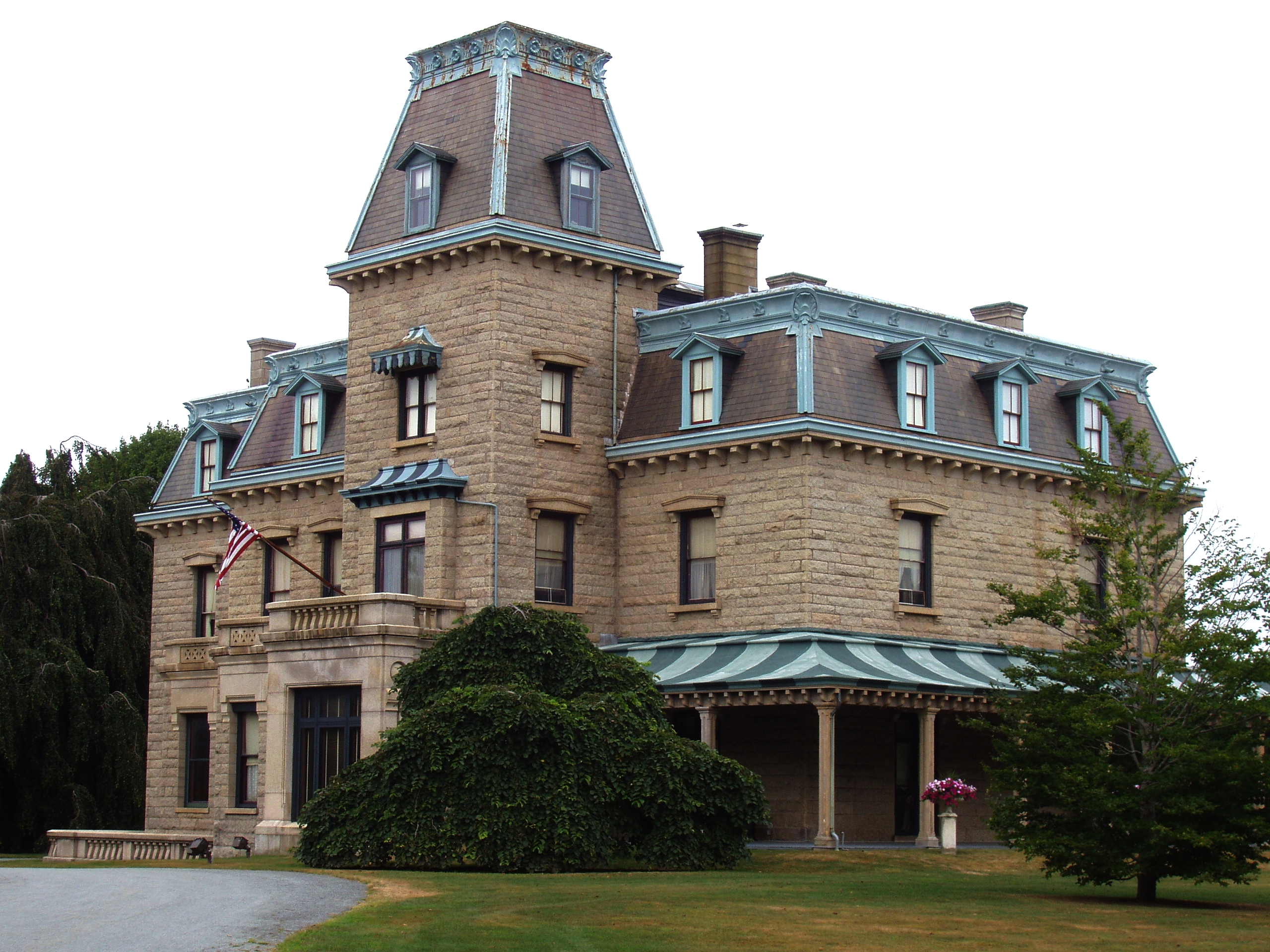
Chateau Sur Mer, Wetmore's home in Newport, Rhode Island, built by his father in 1852

In private life Mr. Wetmore was for many years associated with various organizations for promoting the fine arts. He was one of the organizers of the Metropolitan Opera in New York and a member of the committee in charge of the construction of the Metropolitan Opera House. He was a trustee of the Peabody Museum of Natural History at Yale and of the Peabody Education Fund. In 1888 he was nominated as a Fellow of the University, but declined to have his name considered. He was one of the founders of the Jockey Club, vice president of the National Horse Show Association of America, and a director of other organizations for improving the breeding of horses.

At his home in Newport he was a trustee of the Redwood Library and Athenaeum, president and a trustee of the Newport Hospital, and president of the Newport Reading Room and the Newport Casino. In 1877 he was admitted as a member of the Massachusetts Society of the Cincinnati.

== Personal life ==
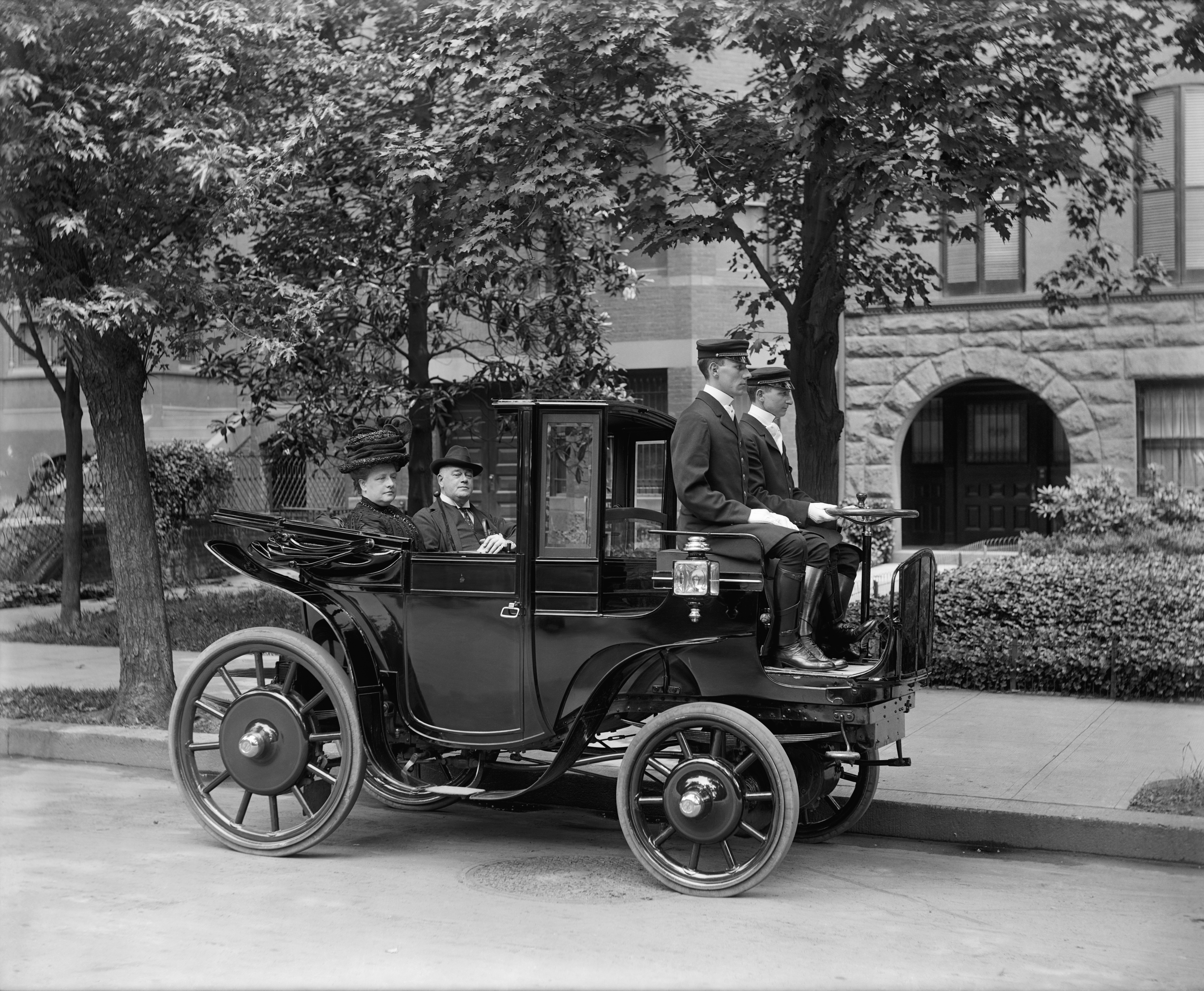
Senator George P. Wetmore in Krieger Electric Carriage "Landaulette" automobile, c. 1906

On December 22, 1869, he was married to Edith Malvina Keteltas (1848–1927) in New York City. Her father, Eugene Keteltas, had been a member of the Yale College Class of 1822, but left before graduating and instead graduated from Union College in 1822. Her grandfather, Philip Doddridge Keteltas, was Yale 1792, her great-grandfather, Rev. Abraham Keteltas, was Yale 1752, and her great-great-grandfather, William Smith, was Yale 1719.

Edith Keteltas Wetmore's brother was Brevet Lieutenant Colonel Henry Keteltas (1838-1896) who served in the American Civil War as a captain in the 15th United States Infantry. He was wounded in action and received two brevets (honorary promotions) for gallantry in action during the war. He was a Veteran Companion of the New York Commandery of the Military Order of the Loyal Legion of the United States. His sword is preserved and on display at the Chateau-sur-Mer mansion in Newport. There is a memorial plaque in his honor at the Army-Navy YMCA building at 50 Washington Square in Newport.

Mr. and Mrs. Wetmore, who were included in Ward McAllister's "Four Hundred", were the parents of four children, two sons who died and two daughters that lived together at the family's Newport estate until their deaths:

- Edith Malvina Keteltas Wetmore (1870–1966), who was an "avid patron of the arts, a prominent collector of rare children’s books from around the world, gardener, and a well-known Newport socialite."
- Maude Alice Keteltas Wetmore (1873–1951) political organizer and philanthropist
- William Shepard Keteltas Wetmore (1875–1925), who received a B.A. degree from Yale in 1897.
- Rogers Pickman Derby Keteltas Wetmore (1882–1917).

His first cousin, once removed, Mary Toppan Pickman, married Massachusetts Congressman and diplomat George B. Loring.

Mr. Wetmore died September 11, 1921, in Boston. His funeral was held at Trinity Church in Newport, and he was buried in Newport's Island Cemetery.

=== Legacy ===
George Wetmore's estate in Newport Rhode Island, Chateau-sur-Mer, is today owned by the Preservation Society of Newport County and is open for tours during the summer. It is considered one of the best surviving examples of a Victorian mansion.

Wetmore was also a litigant in the Supreme Court of the United States decision: George Peabody Wetmore v. Tennessee Copper Company, 218 US 369 (1910).

== See also ==
- List of United States governors born outside the United States

Party political offices
| Preceded by Augustus O. Bourn | Republican nominee for Governor of Rhode Island; 1885, 1886, 1887 | Succeeded by Royal C. Taft |
Political offices
| Preceded by Augustus O. Bourn | Governor of Rhode Island; 1885–1887 | Succeeded by John W. Davis |
U.S. Senate
| Preceded by Nathan F. Dixon III | U.S. senator (Class 2) from Rhode Island; March 4, 1895 – March 3, 1907; January 22, 1908 – March 3, 1913 | Succeeded by LeBaron B. Colt |
