= 1891 Maryland gubernatorial election =

- November 3, 1891
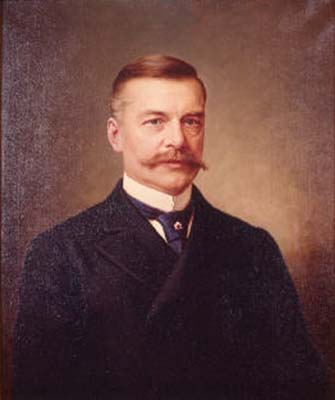

Nominee	Frank Brown	William J. Vannort
Party	Democratic	Republican
Popular vote	108,539	78,388
Percentage	56.52%	40.82%
- County results Brown: 40–50% 50–60% 60–70% Vannort: 50–60%
Governor before election
Elihu Emory Jackson
Democratic
Elected Governor
Frank Brown
Democratic

The 1891 Maryland gubernatorial election took place on November 3, 1891.

Incumbent Democratic Governor Elihu Emory Jackson did not seek re-election.

Democratic candidate Frank Brown defeated Republican candidate William J. Vannort.

== General election ==
=== Candidates ===
- Frank Brown, Democratic, former member of the Maryland House of Delegates, former Postmaster of Baltimore
- William J. Vannort, Republican, farmer
- Edwin Higgins, Prohibition

=== Results ===
1891 Maryland gubernatorial election
Party	Candidate	Votes	%	±%
Democratic	Frank Brown	108,539	56.52%	
Republican	William J. Vannort	78,388	40.82%	
Prohibition	Edwin Higgins	5,120	2.67%	
Majority		30,151	15.70%	
Turnout		192,047		
Democratic hold		Swing		
