= 1891 Iowa gubernatorial election =

- November 3, 1891
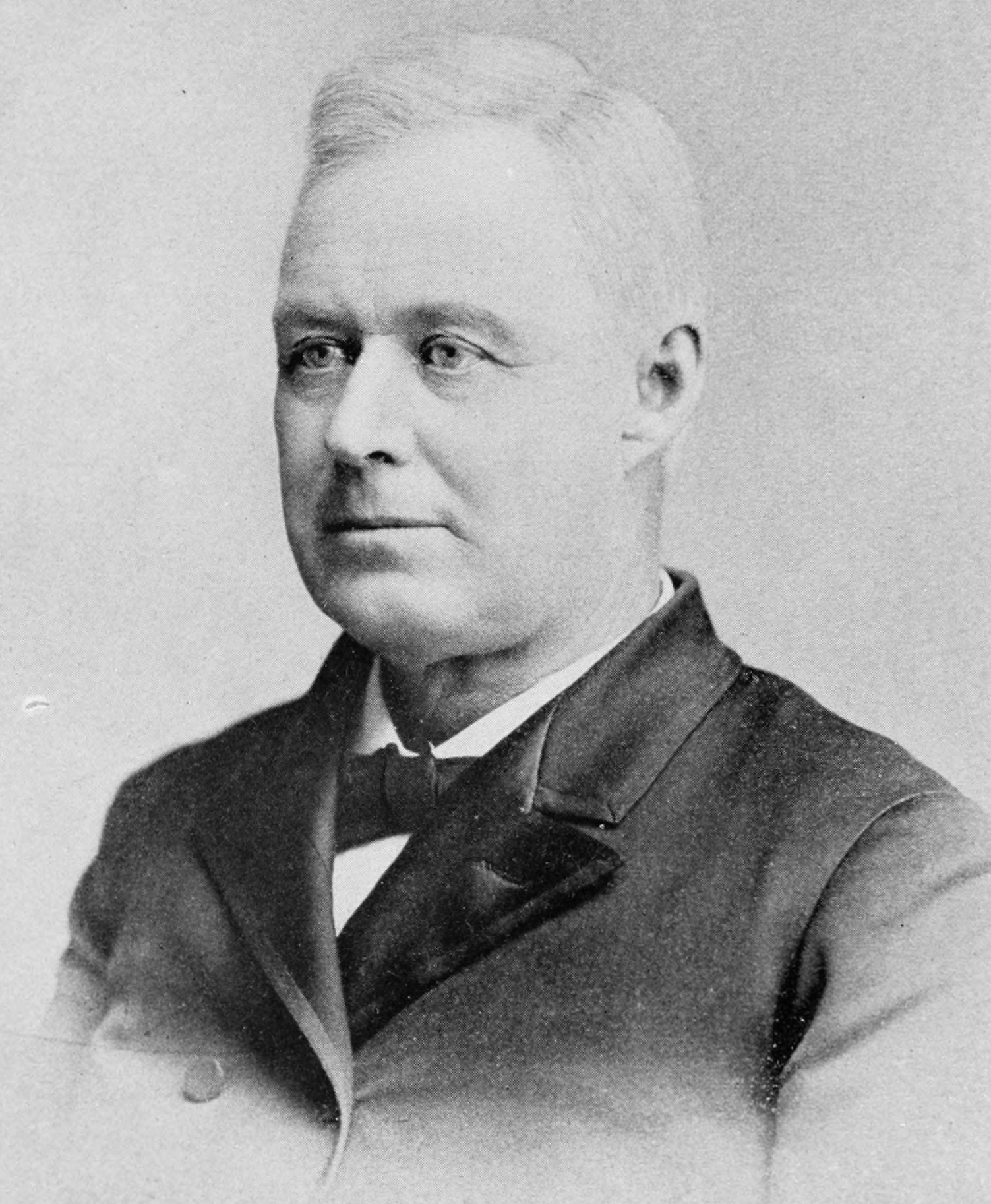

Nominee	Horace Boies	Hiram C. Wheeler
Party	Democratic	Republican
Popular vote	207,594	199,381
Percentage	49.40%	47.45%
- County results Boies: 40–50% 50–60% 60–70% 70–80% Wheeler: 40–50% 50–60% 60–70% Westfall: 30–40%
Governor before election
Horace Boies
Democratic
Elected Governor
Horace Boies
Democratic

The 1891 Iowa gubernatorial election was held on November 3, 1891. Incumbent Democrat Horace Boies defeated Republican nominee Hiram C. Wheeler with 49.40% of the vote.

== General election ==
=== Candidates ===
Major party candidates

- Horace Boies, Democratic
- Hiram C. Wheeler, Republican

Other candidates

- A. J. Westfall, People's
- Isaac T. Gibson, Prohibition

=== Results ===
1891 Iowa gubernatorial election
Party	Candidate	Votes	%	±%
Democratic	Horace Boies (incumbent)	207,594	49.40%	
Republican	Hiram C. Wheeler	199,381	47.45%	
Populist	A. J. Westfall	12,303	2.93%	
Prohibition	Isaac T. Gibson	915	0.22%	
Majority		8,213		
Turnout				
Democratic hold		Swing		
