= Horace Boies =

American politician

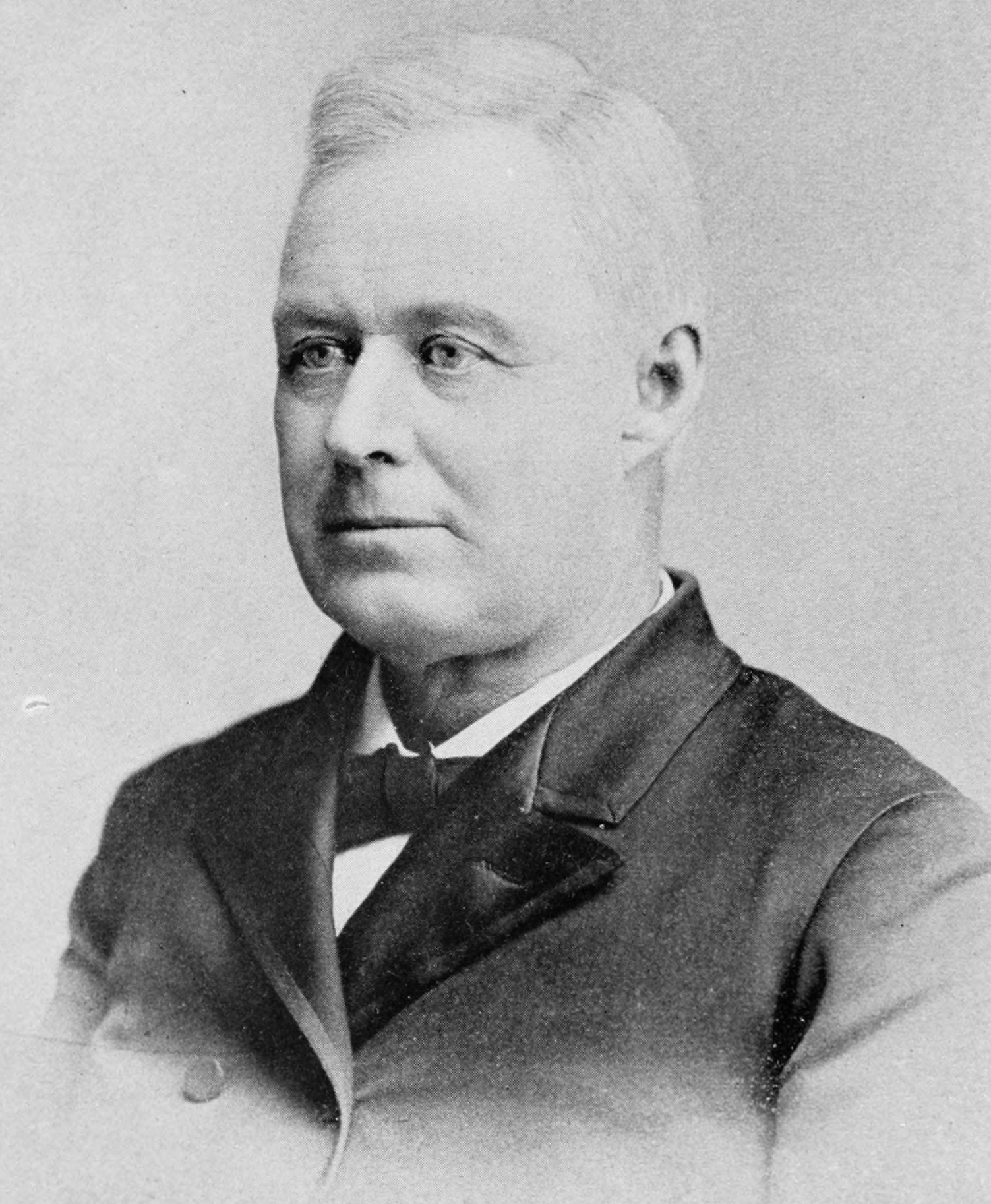

14th Governor of Iowa
- In office February 27, 1890 – January 11, 1894
- Lieutenant: Alfred N. Poyneer; Samuel L. Bestow
- Preceded by: William Larrabee
- Succeeded by: Frank D. Jackson

Member of the New York State Assembly from the 3rd Erie district
- In office January 1, 1857 – December 31, 1857
- Preceded by: John Clark
- Succeeded by: John T. Wheelock

Personal details
- Born: December 7, 1827 Aurora, New York, US
- Died: April 4, 1923 (aged 95) Long Beach, California, US
- Party: Republican (before 1880); Democratic (after 1880)
- Spouse(s): Adella King (m. 1846; died 1855) Versalia M. Barber (m. 1858; died 1877)
- Children: 6
- Profession: Lawyer

Horace Boies (December 7, 1827 – April 4, 1923) served as the 14th governor of Iowa from 1890 to 1894 as a member of the Democratic Party.

== Early life ==
Horace was born in Aurora, New York to Eber Boies, a farmer and veteran of the War of 1812, and Esther (Henshaw) Boies. When he turned 16 he started working as a farm laborer in the Wisconsin Territory. He moved back to New York in 1846, he studied law and was admitted to the bar in 1849, setting up practice in Hamburg. In 1846, he married Adella King. Together they had 3 children. Adella died a day after giving birth to their third child, Nellie. Boies remarried to Versalia M. Barber in 1858. They had another 3 children.

== Political career ==
He was elected to the New York State Assembly as a Republican in 1857.

Boies moved to Waterloo, Iowa, in 1867 and opened a law office. His career was successful, and he purchased large amounts of farmland in the area.

Boies left the Republican Party in 1880 due to their support of prohibition.

=== Iowa Governorship ===
He was elected governor of Iowa as a Democrat in 1889, breaking longtime Republican dominance of state politics. Reelected in 1891, he was defeated in 1893, by Frank D. Jackson, a Republican. He was a prominent populist and advocate of bimetallism, and during his term as governor proclaimed Iowa's first Labor Day holiday.

A wide range of progressive reforms were also introduced during his term. These included the holding of conferences for farmers to improve farming techniques with the Iowa State College of Agriculture and Mechanic Arts, the enactment of laws protecting and registering trademarks with the Iowa Secretary of State, the enactment of laws designed to protect labor, and the creation of a tax commission to study and review the tax laws of Iowa and to make suggestions for improvements.

Boies was the only Democrat Iowa Governor to serve since 1855 and then until 1933.

=== Post Governorship Political Career ===
In 1893, he was offered an appointment, by Grover Cleveland to be the Secretary of Agriculture, but he declined.

As governor, Boies gained sufficient prominence to become involved in national Democratic Party politics, though his campaigns for the presidential nomination at the 1892 and 1896 Democratic National Conventions were unsuccessful as was his last political campaign, in 1902, for Democratic nomination for a Congressional seat from Iowa.

== Later life ==
Following his retirement, Boies moved to Long Beach, California. This was a popular destination for Iowans at the time, and Boies was active in social events of his fellow Iowan transplants, participating in the Long Beach Iowa Reunion and serving as president of the Long Beach Iowa Association.

He died on April 4, 1923 in Long Beach, California, and was buried at the Elmwood Cemetery in Waterloo, Iowa.

Party political offices
Preceded by T. J. Anderson	Democratic nominee for Governor of Iowa; 1889, 1891, 1893	Succeeded by Washington I. Babb
New York State Assembly
Preceded by John Clark	New York State Assembly; Erie County, 3rd District; 1857	Succeeded by John T. Wheelock
Political offices
Preceded by William Larrabee	Governor of Iowa; 1890 – 1894	Succeeded by Frank D. Jackson
