= 1891 Rhode Island gubernatorial election =

- April 1, 1891

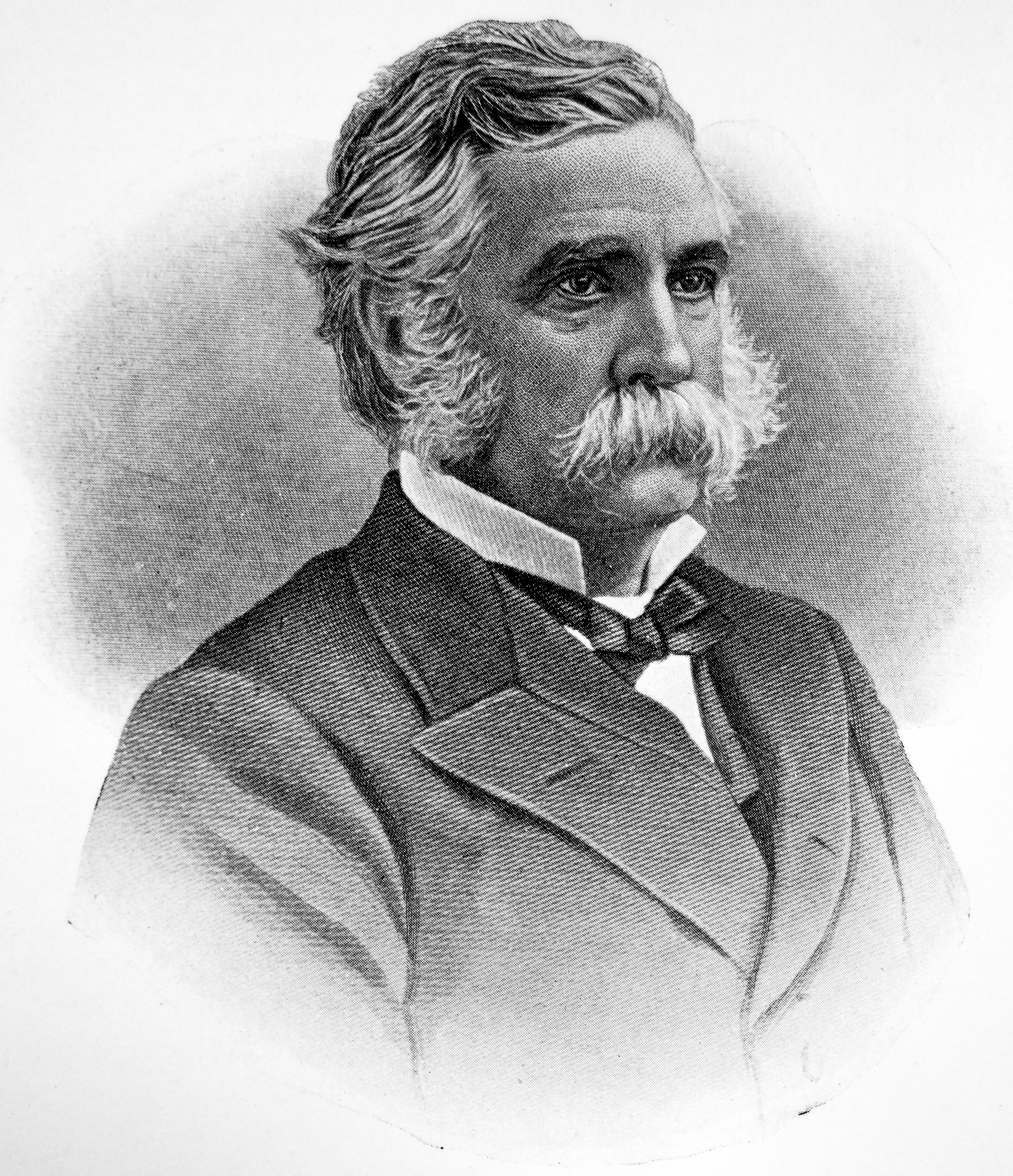
Nominee	Herbert W. Ladd	John W. Davis
Party	Republican	Democratic
Popular vote	20,995	22,249
Percentage	46.19%	48.95%
- Ladd: 40–50% 50–60% 70–80% Davis: 40–50% 50–60%
Governor before election
John W. Davis
Democratic
Elected Governor
Herbert W. Ladd
Republican

The 1891 Rhode Island gubernatorial election was held on April 1, 1891. Democratic incumbent John W. Davis received 48.95% of the vote and Republican nominee Herbert W. Ladd 46.19%. With no candidate attaining a majority of the vote it was decided by the Rhode Island General Assembly The Republican majority selected Ladd.

== General election ==
=== Candidates ===
Major party candidates

- Herbert W. Ladd, Republican
- John W. Davis, Democratic

Other candidates

- John H. Larry, Prohibition
- Franklin E. Burton, Independent

=== Results ===
1891 Rhode Island gubernatorial election
Party	Candidate	Votes	%	±%
Republican	Herbert W. Ladd	20,995	46.19%	
Democratic	John W. Davis (incumbent)	22,249	48.95%	
Prohibition	John H. Larry	1,829	4.02%	
Independent	Franklin E. Burton	384	0.85%	
Majority		1,254		
Turnout				
Republican gain from Democratic		Swing		
