= Herbert W. Ladd =

American politician (1843–1913)

Herbert Warren Ladd
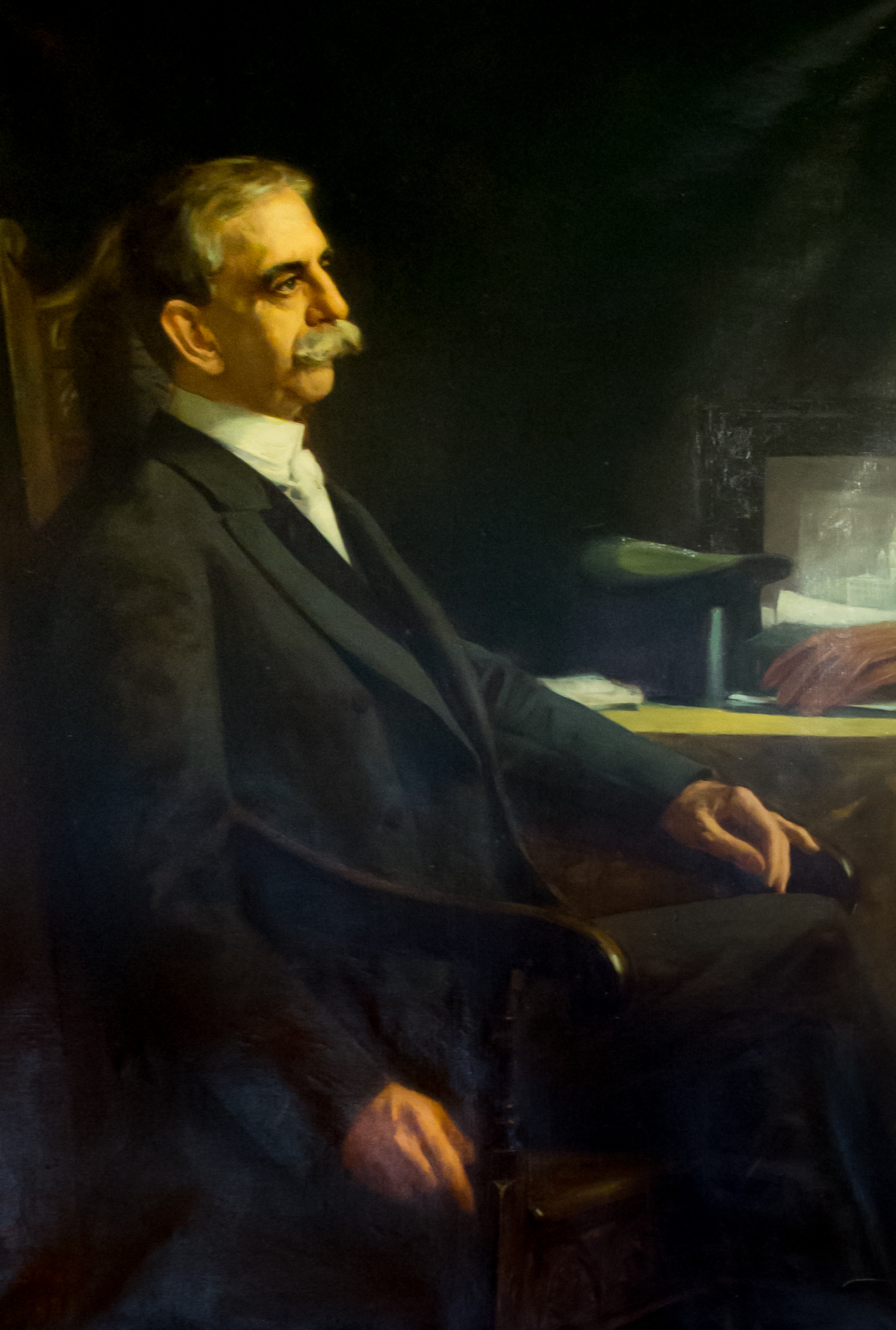
- Official portrait in the RI State House. Note the bicycle seat visible to Ladd's left.

40th and 42nd Governor of Rhode Island
- In office May 28, 1889 – May 26, 1890
- Lieutenant: Daniel Littlefield
- Preceded by: Royal C. Taft
- Succeeded by: John W. Davis
- In office May 26, 1891 – May 31, 1892
- Lieutenant: Henry A. Stearns
- Preceded by: John W. Davis
- Succeeded by: Daniel Russell Brown

President of Rhode Island School of Design
- In office 1891–1896
- Succeeded by: William Carey Poland

Personal details
- Born: October 15, 1843 New Bedford, Bristol County, Massachusetts, U.S.
- Died: November 29, 1913 (aged 70)
- Cause of death: cerebral hemorrhage
- Resting place: Swan Point Cemetery
- Party: Republican
- Spouse: Emma Burrows
- Parent(s): Warren Ladd and Lucy Washburn Kingman
- Profession: Dry goods merchant, Politician

Herbert Warren Ladd (October 15, 1843 – November 29, 1913) was the 40th and 42nd governor of Rhode Island for two terms: 1889–90 and 1891–92.

== Life and career ==
Ladd was born in New Bedford, Bristol County, Massachusetts, on October 15, 1843. He was one of five children of Warren Ladd and Lucy Washburn Kingman. The elder Ladd was involved in New Bedford city politics.

Herbert started his career after high school as a dry goods merchant. During the Civil War he became a reporter for the New Bedford Mercury newspaper, covering several Massachusetts regiments. At war's end, he returned to the dry goods business, first in Boston, then in Rhode Island. His firm was called Ladd and Davis, later renamed the H.W. Ladd Company.

On May 25, 1870, Ladd married Emma Burrows of Providence; she died in 1889, just as her husband began his term as governor. They had six children. He was an active member of the Freemasons.

== Governor ==
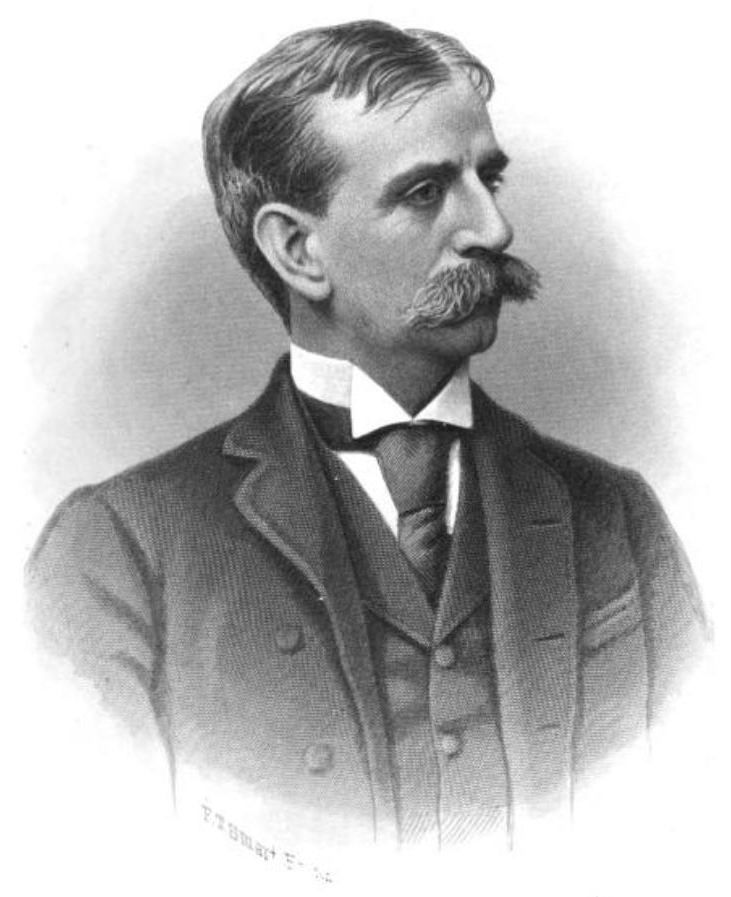
1891 engraving

When Ladd first ran for governor in 1889, he was little-known in the state. In a three-way race, he received fewer votes than Democrat John W. Davis. The third candidate, with the fewest votes, ran under the Prohibition Party. Under the rules of the time, if no candidate received an outright majority, the result was decided by the General Assembly. The Republican-controlled Assembly chose Ladd.

In fact, Davis received more votes than Ladd three times, in 1889, 1890, and 1891, without winning a majority in any of the three races. The Assembly decided in favor of Ladd twice (1889 and 1891) and for Davis in 1890. The majority requirement was amended in November 1893 by the adoption of Amendment X to the Rhode Island Constitution, which allowed for a winner by plurality vote. In later years, several governors would win the office with a plurality, including: Lincoln Almond in 1994 with 47%; Lincoln Chafee in 2010 with 36%; and Gina Raimondo in 2014 with 41%.

=== State House commission ===
In Ladd's first address as governor, he advocated for building a new State House. Ladd was named chairman of the State House Commission. The General Assembly announced an architectural competition for designs; however, Ladd and commission advisor Richard Morris Hunt decided they wanted Charles Follen McKim for the job, and made sure that he "won" the competition. It was reported that Ladd paid a "considerable amount of money" out of his own pocket to help pay for the construction when the state was low on funds, and was never reimbursed for the monies.

=== Good roads ===
Ladd, whose official State House portrait depicts him with a bicycle, was a supporter of the Good Roads Movement, a national road improvement initiative led by bicyclists. In 1892, Ladd wrote an essay for a League of American Wheelmen publication Good Roads outlining his belief that expanding and paving streets was as important to Rhode Island as having good railroads.

=== Other achievements ===
- During the summer of 1889, Ladd hosted president Harrison and ex-president Cleveland in Newport.
- In fall of 1889, Ladd invited business leaders to Providence to discuss the location of the upcoming World's Fair.
- Ladd authorized new uniforms for the Rhode Island state militia.

== Post-Governorship ==
After serving two nonconsecutive terms, Ladd never ran again for public office. He involved himself with several organizations. He founded and served as president for three years of the Commercial Club. He was also president of the Society for the Prevention of Cruelty to Children. He was a member of the YMCA, the Rhode Island Choral Association, the Board of Trade, the Providence Press Club, and the Hope Club.

From 1891 to 1896, Ladd served as the President of Rhode Island School of Design.

== Death ==
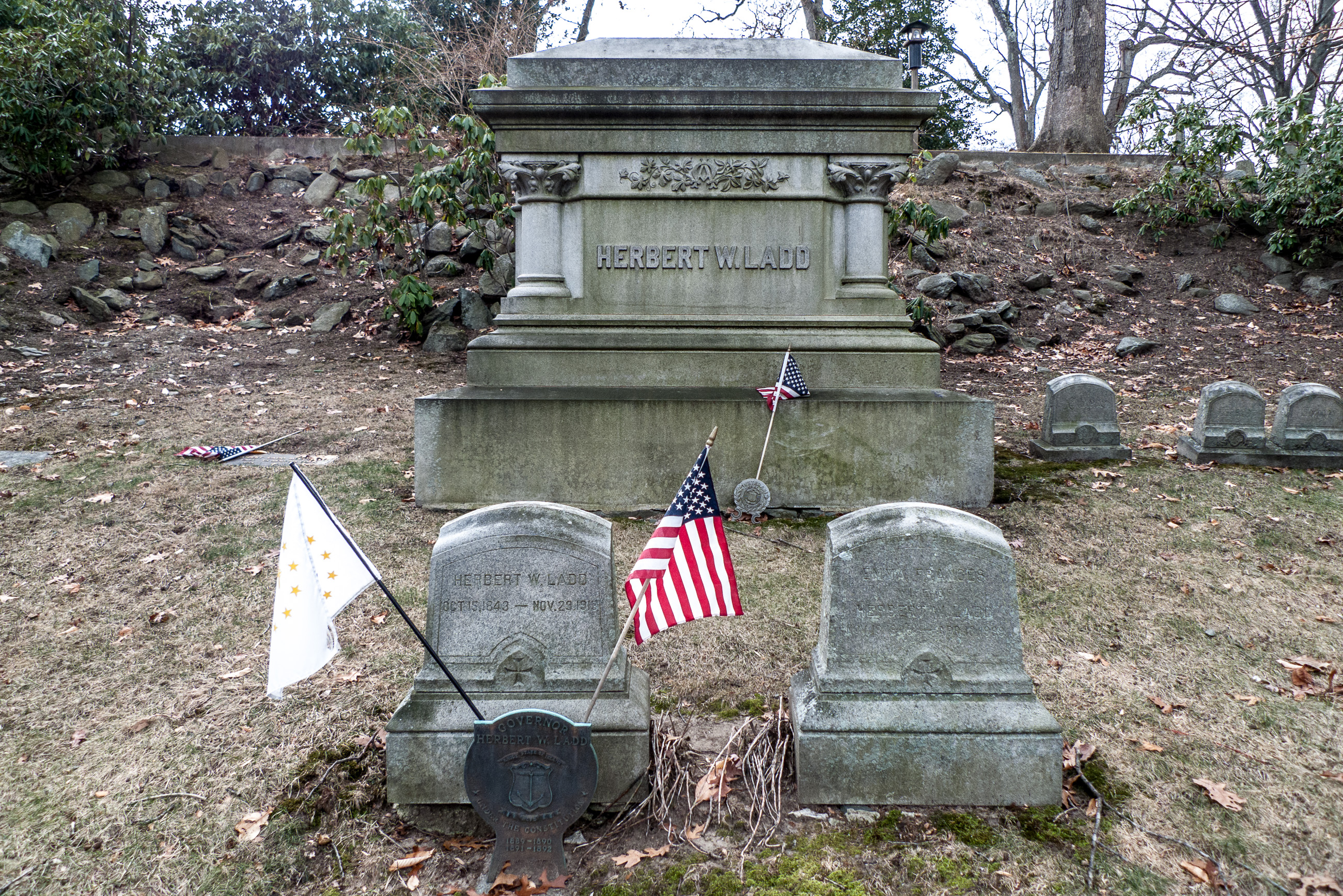
Herbert W. Ladd grave in Swan Point Cemetery, Providence.

Ladd died of a cerebral hemorrhage on November 30, 1913, after a long illness. He was interred at Swan Point Cemetery, Providence, Rhode Island.

== Honors and legacy ==
The Ladd Laboratory, an agricultural research facility established at the University of Rhode Island in 1891, was named for Governor Ladd.

In 1889, at the 121st Commencement of Brown University, Ladd announced that he would donate an astronomical observatory to the school. The expected cost was US$25,000, but the building reportedly cost over US$40,000, equivalent to $1,400,000 in 2025. The Ladd Observatory, completed in 1891, is named in his honor.

Ladd received an honorary Master of Arts Degree from Brown University in 1892.

Party political offices
Preceded by Royal C. Taft	Republican nominee for Governor of Rhode Island; 1889, 1890, 1891	Succeeded by Daniel Russell Brown
Political offices
Preceded by Royal C. Taft	Governor of Rhode Island; 1889–1890	Succeeded by John W. Davis
Preceded by John W. Davis	Governor of Rhode Island; 1891–1892	Succeeded by Daniel Russell Brown
