= Royal C. Taft =

American politician

Royal Chapin Taft, Sr.
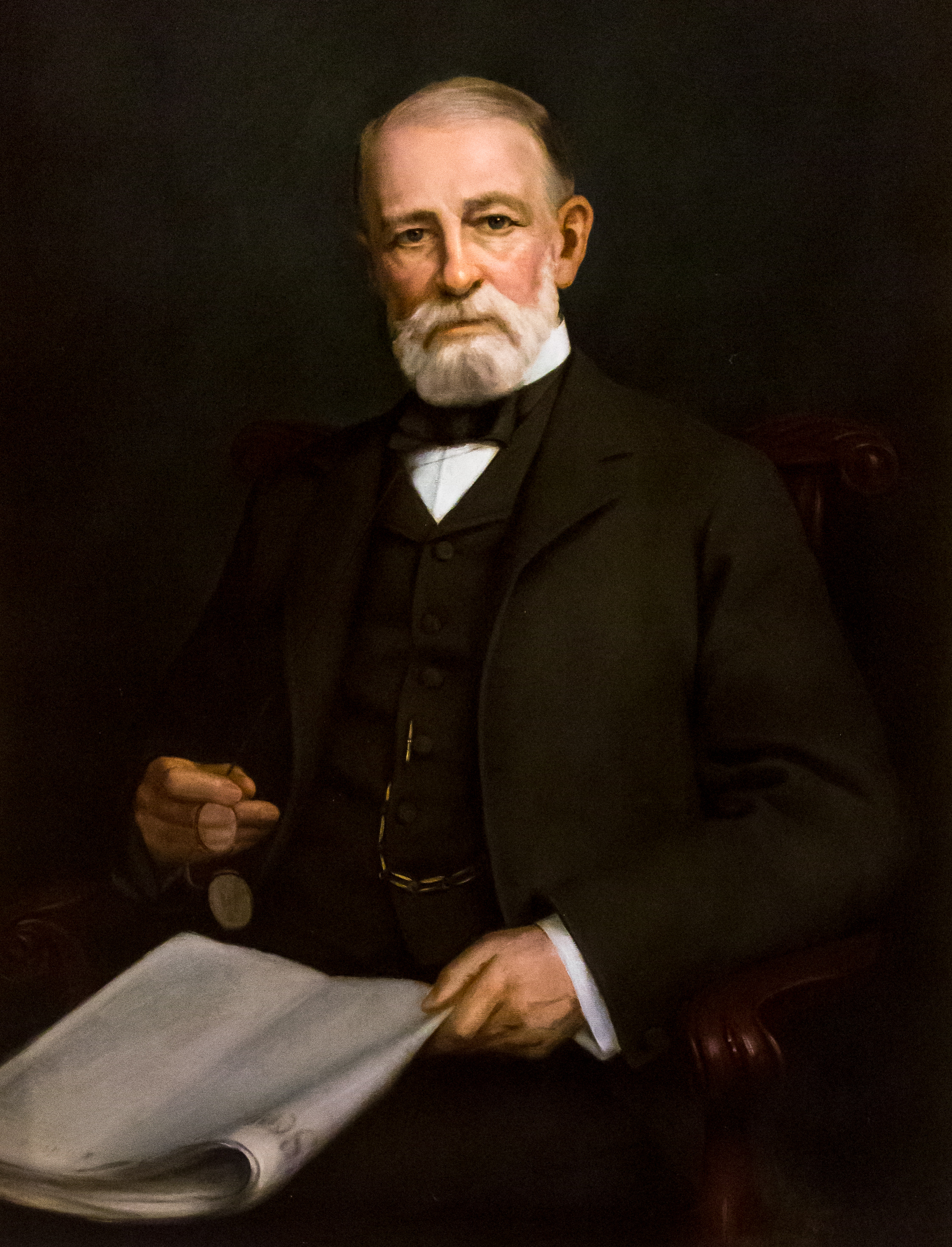

39th Governor of Rhode Island
- In office May 29, 1888 – May 28, 1889
- Lieutenant: Enos Lapham
- Preceded by: John W. Davis
- Succeeded by: Herbert W. Ladd

Member of the Rhode Island House of Representatives
- In office 1880–1884 Serving with 11 others each one-year term (multi-member district)
- Preceded by: 12 others (multi-member district)
- Succeeded by: 12 others (multi-member district)
- Constituency: Providence

Personal details
- Born: Royal Chapin Taft; February 14, 1823 Northbridge, Massachusetts, U.S.
- Died: June 4, 1912 (aged 89) Providence, Rhode Island, U.S.
- Resting place: Swan Point Cemetery
- Party: Republican
- Spouse: Mary Frances Armington
- Children: Royal Chapin Taft Jr. (died 1942)
- Parent(s): Orsmus Taft; Margaret Smith
- Education: Worcester Academy; Cornell University
- Profession: Businessman (banking and railroads)

Royal Chapin Taft Sr. (February 14, 1823 – June 4, 1912) was a US politician and businessman, whose served as the 39th governor of Rhode Island from 1888 to 1889. He was a member of the Taft political family; as a descendant of Robert Taft Sr., he was a distant cousin of President of the United States William Howard Taft.

== Biography ==
Taft was born in Northbridge, Massachusetts, on February 14, 1823, and was educated at Worcester Academy. His parents were Orsmus Taft and Margaret (Smith) Taft; on October 31, 1850, he married Mary Frances Armington. They had four children.

He served as the treasurer of Central Congregational Church in Providence from 1855 to 1856. He belonged to the Republican Party, and was an elected member of Rhode Island House of Representatives from 1880 to 1884 before his term as governor.

Taft was a member of the firm Bradford & Taft, wool dealers, from which he retired in 1885. He was also president of the Merchants National Bank from 1868 president of the Boston & Providence Railroad, and a director of the New York, New Haven and Hartford Railroad (which took control of the B&P in 1893).

In 1890 he became a charter member of the Rhode Island Society of the Sons of the American Revolution. He served as the Society's president from 1897 to 1898.

He died June 4, 1912, at his home in Providence, Rhode Island. At the time of his death, he was the oldest living ex-governor of Rhode Island. He is interred at Swan Point Cemetery, Providence.

== Legacy ==
He was a patron of the arts, with a large private collection; parts of his collection are now part of various institutions such as the Rhode Island School of Design.

Taft Hall at the University of Rhode Island is named after him, as well as the Royal C. Taft Outpatient Building (1891) at Rhode Island Hospital in Providence.

== See also ==
- List of presidents of the Rhode Island School of Design

Party political offices
Preceded by George P. Wetmore	Republican nominee for Governor of Rhode Island; 1888	Succeeded by Herbert W. Ladd
Political offices
Preceded by John W. Davis	Governor of Rhode Island; 1888–1889	Succeeded by Herbert W. Ladd
