= John W. Davis (Rhode Island politician) =

American politician

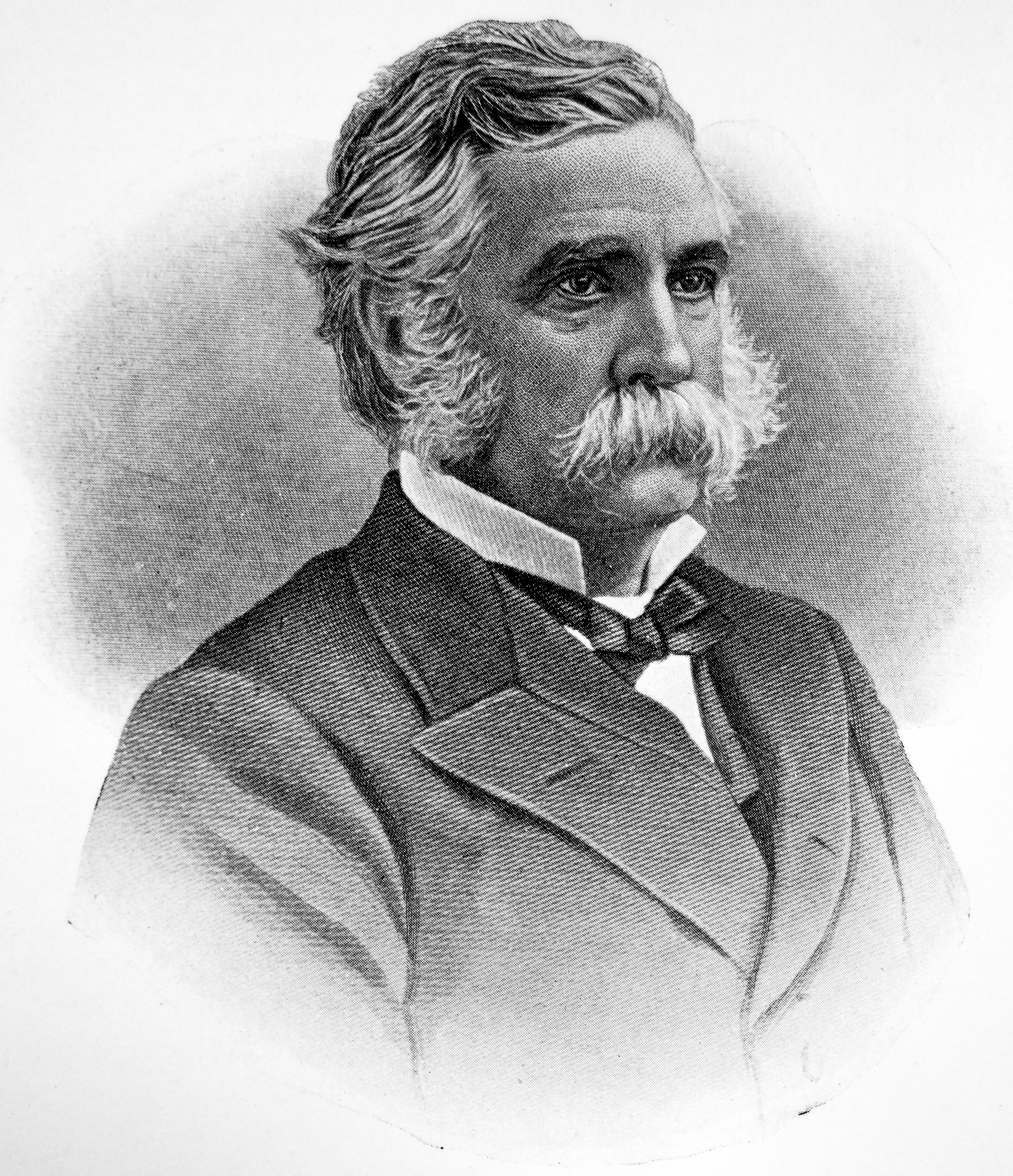

38th and 41st Governor of Rhode Island
- In office May 27, 1890 – May 26, 1891
- Lieutenant: William T. C. Wardwell
- Preceded by: Herbert W. Ladd
- Succeeded by: Herbert W. Ladd
- In office May 29, 1887 – May 29, 1888
- Lieutenant: Samuel R. Honey
- Preceded by: George P. Wetmore
- Succeeded by: Royal C. Taft

Member of the Rhode Island Senate
- In office 1885–1886

Personal details
- Born: John William Davis; March 7, 1826 Rehoboth, Massachusetts, U.S.
- Died: January 25, 1907 (aged 80) Pawtucket, Rhode Island, U.S.
- Resting place: Riverside Cemetery
- Party: Democratic
- Spouses: Lydia W. Kenyon; Emily P. Goffe; Marietta P. Pearse
- Occupation: Mason, teacher

Military service
- Allegiance: United States of America
- Branch/service: National Guard
- Years of service: 1861–1865
- Unit: Rhode Island National Guard
- Battles/wars: American Civil War

John William Davis (March 7, 1826 – January 25, 1907) was a United States Democratic politician, who served as the 38th and 41st governor of Rhode Island (1887–1888 and 1890–1891).

== Early life and career ==
John W. Davis was born at his family's farm house in Rehoboth, Massachusetts on March 7, 1826. He attended public schools in Rehoboth and a private school in Pawtucket, Rhode Island. Before entering politics, he was engaged in various occupations; in 1844 he moved to Providence to become apprenticed as a mason. He also received his certification as a schoolteacher, and for several years traveled through the southern states to work in both professions. Davis then started in partnership with his brother a grain and provisions business on South Water Street in Providence, which operated from 1850 to 1890.

During the American Civil War, he served in the Rhode Island Militia, first as a member of an infantry unit, and later in a local unit known as the Providence Horse Guards.

== Early political career ==
His first experience in politics was as a member of the Democratic City Committee of Providence in 1854.

Davis moved to Pawtucket, Rhode Island in 1877 to serve as the resident manager of Riverside Cemetery. He lived on the cemetery grounds in a wooden octagonal gatehouse. Davis served in a number of local offices in Pawtucket. In 1882 and 1885 he served on the Town Council. He served in the Rhode Island Senate in 1885 and 1886.

In 1886, Davis was appointed by fellow Democratic President Grover Cleveland as an Appraiser of Foreign Merchandise for the Providence U.S. Customs District.

== Governor ==
Davis served two nonconsecutive one-year terms as governor. He was the first Democratic governor since the 1850s and the first Pawtucket resident in the State House since Joseph Jenckes Jr. in the 1730s. His progressive administration was known for giving foreign-born residents the same voting rights as native-born citizens, expanding suffrage to women, establishing the boundary line between Rhode Island and Connecticut, and reforming election laws and orphanages.

=== First term ===
He was Democratic gubernatorial nominee in 1887 and defeated incumbent Republican George P. Wetmore. Davis won with support from many Republicans, who were unhappy with party leadership.

During his first term as governor, the Women's Suffrage Amendment to the state constitution was approved, the boundary line between Rhode Island and Connecticut was established, and election laws were reformed to eliminate fraud. Davis was defeated for re-election in 1888 by Republican candidate Royal C. Taft, but ran again in 1889 against Herbert W. Ladd.

=== Plurality is not enough to win ===
Prior to 1893, Rhode Island's constitution had a majority election requirement; that is, if no candidate for state races received an outright majority, the result would be decided by the General Assembly. This became an issue during a period of four years, 1889–1893, during which the rise of the Prohibition Party caused several state races to be sent to the Assembly for decision. Three times, in 1889, 1890, and 1891, Democrat Davis received more votes than Republican Ladd in the governor's race, yet did not receive a majority. The Assembly decided in favor of Ladd twice (1889 and 1891) and for Davis in 1890. This situation was eventually remedied in November 1893 by the adoption of Amendment X to the Rhode Island Constitution, which allowed for a winner by plurality vote.

=== Second term ===
During Davis's second administration the governor was given authorization to appoint a commission to revise and codify general statutes, and funds were appropriated for completion of a Soldiers’ Home. He undertook the construction of College Hall at the University of Rhode Island, then the largest building on campus. When it burned down in 1895 and was rebuilt, it was renamed Davis Hall in his honor.

Davis was defeated for re-election once again in 1891, but did not retire from active politics; he was elected to the state Senate from Pawtucket in 1892, and served as Mayor of Pawtucket in 1897. He also served on the State House Commission.

Davis died on January 25, 1907, in Pawtucket, Rhode Island. He is buried at Riverside Cemetery, where he had previously served as manager.

== Marriage ==
Davis was married three times: to Lydia W. Kenyon (died 1859); Emily P. Goffe, two children; and Marietta P. Pearse. Davis was raised Methodist and later became Episcopalian.

== See also ==
- List of mayors of Pawtucket, Rhode Island

Party political offices
| Preceded by Amasa Sprague | Democratic nominee for Governor of Rhode Island; 1887, 1888, 1889, 1890, 1891 | Succeeded by William T. C. Wardwell |
Political offices
| Preceded by George P. Wetmore | Governor of Rhode Island; 1887–1888 | Succeeded by Royal C. Taft |
| Preceded by Herbert W. Ladd | Governor of Rhode Island; 1890–1891 | Succeeded by Herbert W. Ladd |
