= 1891 Kentucky gubernatorial election =

- August 3, 1891
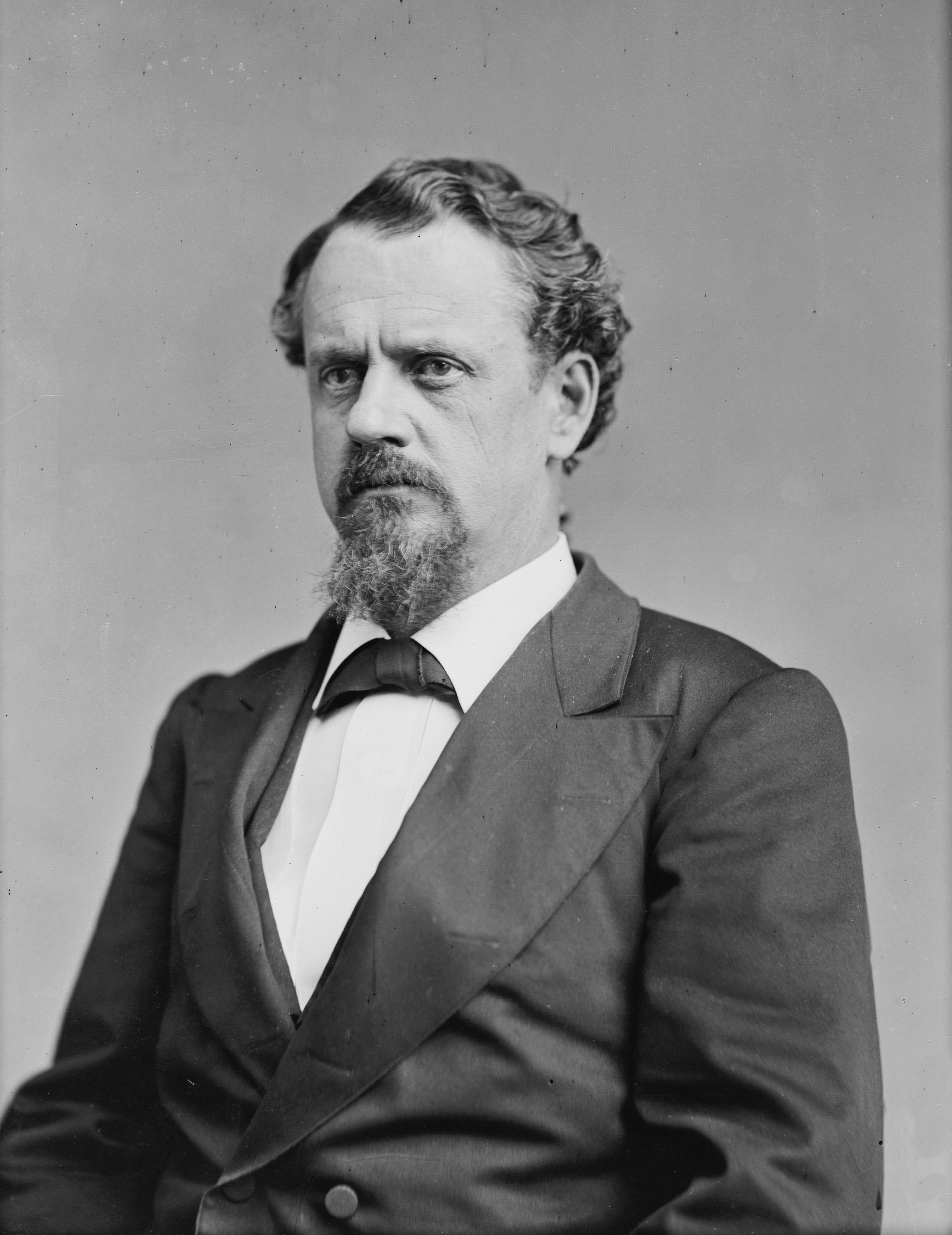

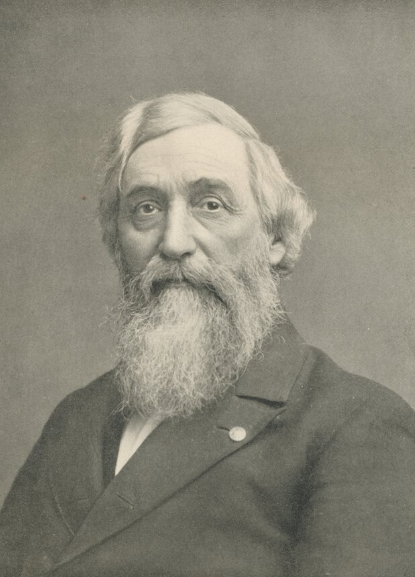

| Nominee | John Y. Brown | Andrew T. Wood | S. B. Erwin |
| Party | Democratic | Republican | Populist |
| Popular vote | 144,168 | 116,087 | 25,631 |
| Percentage | 49.85% | 40.14% | 8.86% |
- County results Brown: 30–40% 40–50% 50–60% 60–70% 70–80% 80–90% Wood: 30–40% 40–50% 50–60% 60–70% 70–80% 80–90% Erwin: 30–40%
Governor before election
Simon Bolivar Buckner
Democratic
Elected Governor
John Y. Brown
Democratic

The 1891 Kentucky gubernatorial election was held on August 3, 1891. Democratic nominee John Y. Brown defeated Republican nominee Andrew T. Wood with 49.85% of the vote.

== General election ==
=== Candidates ===
Major party candidates

- John Y. Brown, Democratic
- Andrew T. Wood, Republican

Other candidates

- S. B. Erwin, People's
- Josiah Harris, Prohibition

=== Results ===
1891 Kentucky gubernatorial election
| Party | Candidate | Votes | % | ±% |
|---|---|---|---|---|
| Democratic | John Y. Brown | 144,168 | 49.85% | −0.85% |
| Republican | Andrew T. Wood | 116,087 | 40.14% | −4.62% |
| Populist | S. B. Erwin | 25,631 | 8.86% | N/A |
| Prohibition | Josiah Harris | 3,293 | 1.14% | −1.83% |
| Majority | | 28,081 | 9.71% | |
| Turnout | | | | |
| Democratic hold | | Swing | | |
