= 1891 Ohio gubernatorial election =

- November 3, 1891
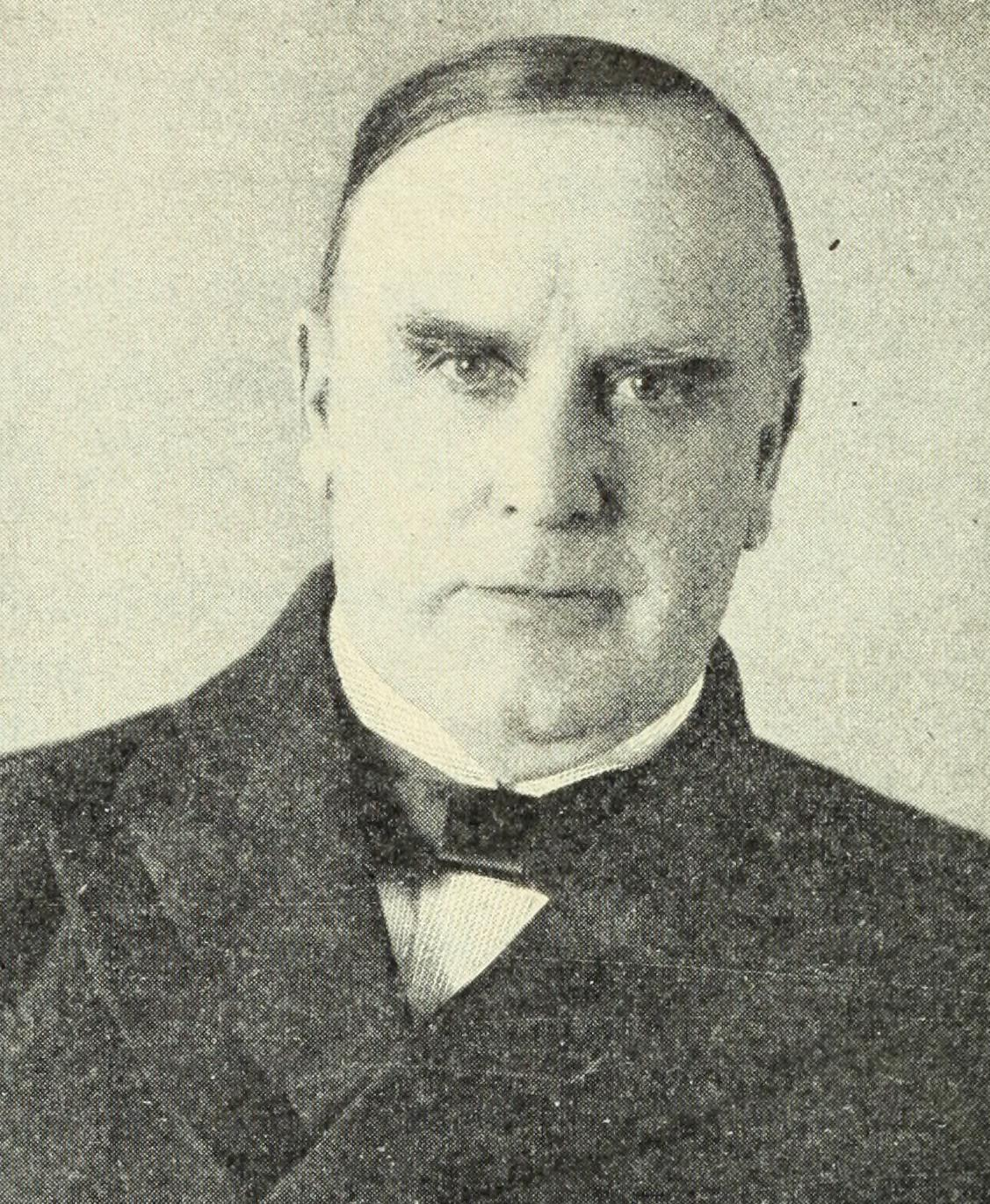

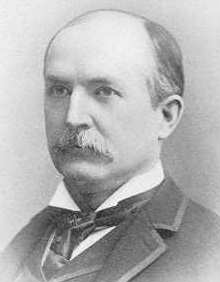
Nominee	William McKinley	James E. Campbell
Party	Republican	Democratic
Popular vote	386,739	365,228
Percentage	48.61%	45.90%
- County results McKinley: 40–50% 50–60% 60–70% Campbell: 40–50% 50–60% 60–70% 70–80%
Governor before election
James E. Campbell
Democratic
Elected Governor
William McKinley
Republican

The 1891 Ohio gubernatorial election was held on November 3, 1891. Republican nominee and future U.S. President William McKinley defeated Democratic incumbent James E. Campbell with 48.61% of the vote.

== General election ==
=== Candidates ===
Major party candidates

- William McKinley, Republican
- James E. Campbell, Democratic

Other candidates

- John J. Seitz, People's
- John J. Ashenhurst, Prohibition

=== Results ===
1891 Ohio gubernatorial election
Party	Candidate	Votes	%	±%
Republican	William McKinley	386,739	48.61%	
Democratic	James E. Campbell (incumbent)	365,228	45.90%	
Populist	John J. Seitz	23,472	2.95%	
Prohibition	John J. Ashenhurst	20,190	2.54%	
Majority		21,511		
Turnout				
Republican gain from Democratic		Swing		
