= 1885 United States gubernatorial elections =

- November 3, 1885; April 1, 1885 (RI); October 13, 1885 (OH)

7 state governorships
	Majority party	Minority party
Party	Democratic	Republican
Last election	22 governorships	15 governorships
Seats before	22	15
Seats after	22	16
Seat change	Steady	▲1
- Democratic gain Democratic hold Republican gain Republican hold

United States gubernatorial elections were held in 1885, in seven states.

Mississippi and Virginia at this time held their gubernatorial elections in odd numbered years, every 4 years, following the United States presidential election year. New York at this time elected its governors to a three-year term. Massachusetts and Rhode Island both elected its governors to a single-year term, which they would abandon in 1920 and 1912, respectively. Iowa and Ohio at this time held gubernatorial elections in every odd numbered year.

In Ohio, the gubernatorial election was held in October for the last time; the next gubernatorial election would be held on the same day as federal elections.

== Results ==
State	Incumbent	Party	Status	Opposing candidates
Iowa	Buren R. Sherman	Republican	Retired, Republican victory	William Larrabee (Republican) 50.76% Charles E. Whiting (Democratic) 48.73% James Mickelwatt (Prohibition) 0.41% Elias Doty (Greenback) 0.09% Scattering 0.01%
Massachusetts	George D. Robinson	Republican	Re-elected, 53.53%	Frederick O. Prince (Democratic) 43.09% Thomas J. Lothrop (Prohibition) 2.25% James Sumner (Greenback) 1.06% Scattering 0.07%
Mississippi	Robert Lowry	Democratic	Re-elected, 99.01%	Put Darden (Independent) 0.92% Scattering 0.07%
New York	David B. Hill (acting)	Democratic	Re-elected, 48.86%	Ira Davenport (Republican) 47.78% Henry Clay Bascom (Prohibition) 3.01% George O. Jones (Greenback) 0.21% Defective and scattering 0.14%
Ohio (held, 13 October 1885)	George Hoadly	Democratic	Defeated, 46.75%	Joseph B. Foraker (Republican) 49.14% Adna B. Leonard (Prohibition) 3.84% John W. Northrop (Greenback) 0.27%
Rhode Island (held, 1 April 1885)	Augustus O. Bourn	Republican	[data missing]	George P. Wetmore (Republican) 56.22% Ziba O. Slocum (Democratic) 38.37% George H. Slade (Prohibition) 5.40% Scattering 0.02%
Virginia	William E. Cameron	Readjuster	Term-limited, Democratic victory	Fitzhugh Lee (Democratic) 52.77% John Sergeant Wise (Republican) 47.22% Scattering 0.01%

== Bibliography ==
- Glashan, Roy R. (1979). American Governors and Gubernatorial Elections, 1775-1978. Meckler Books. ISBN 0-930466-17-9.
- Gubernatorial Elections, 1787-1997. Washington, D.C.: Congressional Quarterly Inc. 1998. ISBN 1-56802-396-0.
- Dubin, Michael J. (2014). United States Gubernatorial Elections, 1861-1911: The Official Results by State and County. Jefferson, North Carolina: McFarland. ISBN 978-0-7864-4722-0.
- McPherson, Edward, ed. (1886). The Tribune Almanac and Political Register for 1886. New York, NY: The Tribune Association.
