= 1887 United States gubernatorial elections =

- November 1, 1887 (OH); November 8, 1887; April 6, 1887 (RI); August 1, 1887 (KY)

6 state governorships
	Majority party	Minority party
Party	Democratic	Republican
Last election	22 governorships	16 governorships
Seats before	21	17 (Note: Robert Waterman (R) succeeded California Governor Washington Bartlett (D) who died in office in September 1887.)
Seats after	22	16
Seat change	▲1	▼1
- Democratic gain Democratic hold Republican hold

United States gubernatorial elections were held in 1887, in six states.

Kentucky and Maryland held their gubernatorial elections in odd numbered years, every 4 years, preceding the United States presidential election year. Massachusetts and Rhode Island both elected their respective governors to a single-year term. They would abandon this practice in 1920 and 1912, respectively. Iowa and Ohio at this time held gubernatorial elections in every odd numbered year.

== Results ==
State	Incumbent	Party	Status	Opposing candidates
Iowa	William Larrabee	Republican	Re-elected, 50.17%	T. J. Anderson (Democratic) 45.47% M. J. Cain (Union Labor) 4.23% V. G. Farnham (Prohibition) 0.10% J. M. Anderson 0.01% Scattering 0.01%
Kentucky (held, 1 August 1887)	J. Proctor Knott	Democratic	Term-limited, Democratic victory	Simon Bolivar Buckner (Democratic) 50.70% William O'Connell Bradley (Republican) 44.78% Fontaine T. Fox (Prohibition) 2.97% A. H. Cardin (Union Labor) 1.57%
Maryland	Henry Lloyd	Democratic	Retired, Democratic victory	Elihu Emory Jackson (Democratic) 51.12% Walter B. Brooks (Republican) 45.57% Summerfield Baldwin (Prohibition) 2.32%
Massachusetts	Oliver Ames	Republican	Re-elected, 51.12%	Henry B. Lovering (Democratic) 44.50% William H. Earle (Prohibition) 4.11% Charles E. Marks (Union Labor) 0.22% Scattering 0.04%
Ohio (held, 1 November 1887)	Joseph B. Foraker	Republican	Re-elected, 47.91%	Thomas E. Powell (Democratic) 44.78% Morris Sharp (Prohibition) 3.99% John Seitz (Union Labor) 3.32%
Rhode Island (held, 6 April 1887)	George Peabody Wetmore	Republican	Defeated, 43.01%	John W. Davis (Democratic) 51.50% Thomas H. Peabody (Prohibition) 5.39% Scattering 0.10%

== Bibliography ==
- Glashan, Roy R. (1979). American Governors and Gubernatorial Elections, 1775-1978. Meckler Books. ISBN 0-930466-17-9.
- Gubernatorial Elections, 1787-1997. Washington, D.C.: Congressional Quarterly Inc. 1998. ISBN 1-56802-396-0.
- Dubin, Michael J. (2014). United States Gubernatorial Elections, 1861-1911: The Official Results by State and County. Jefferson, North Carolina: McFarland. ISBN 978-0-7864-4722-0.
- The Tribune Almanac for 1888. New York, NY: The Tribune Association. 1888.
