= List of elections in 1885 =

The following elections occurred in the year 1885:

== Africa ==
- 1885 Liberian general election

== North America ==
=== Canada ===
- 1885 Newfoundland general election
- 1885 Northwest Territories election

=== United States ===
- 1885 New York state election
- 1885 United States gubernatorial elections
- 1885 United States House of Representatives elections
- United States Senate election in New York, 1885

==== United States Senate ====
- 1884 and 1885 United States Senate elections
- 1885 United States Senate election in California
- 1885 United States Senate election in Illinois
- 1885 United States Senate election in New York
- 1885 United States Senate election in Pennsylvania
- 1885 United States Senate election in Wisconsin

==== United States House of Representatives ====
- 1885 United States House of Representatives elections

==== United States gubernatorial ====
- 1885 Iowa gubernatorial election
- 1885 Massachusetts gubernatorial election
- 1885 Mississippi gubernatorial election
- 1885 New York gubernatorial election
- 1885 Ohio gubernatorial election
- 1885 Rhode Island gubernatorial election
- 1885 United States gubernatorial elections
- 1885 Virginia gubernatorial election

==== United States mayoral elections ====
- 1885 Boston mayoral election
- 1885 Chicago mayoral election

== Europe ==
- 1885 French legislative election
- 1885 Faroese general election
- 1885 Greek parliamentary election
- 1885 Liechtenstein local elections
- 1885 Norwegian parliamentary election

=== United Kingdom ===
- 1885 United Kingdom general election
  - 1885 United Kingdom general election in Ireland
  - 1885 United Kingdom general election in Scotland

== See also ==
- Category:1885 elections
