= List of elections in 1887 =

The following elections occurred in the year 1887.

- 1887 Avon by-election
- 1887 Honduran presidential election
- 1887 Liberian general election
- 1887 New Zealand general election
- 1887 Salvadoran presidential election

== North America ==
=== Canada ===
- 1887 Canadian federal election

=== United States ===
- 1887 New York state election

==== United States Senate ====
- 1886–87 United States Senate elections
- 1887 United States Senate election in California
- 1887 United States Senate election in Massachusetts
- 1887 United States Senate election in New York
- 1887 United States Senate election in Pennsylvania
- 1887 United States Senate election in Wisconsin

==== United States House of Representatives ====
- 1887 United States House of Representatives elections

==== United States gubernatorial ====
- 1887 Iowa gubernatorial election
- 1887 Kentucky gubernatorial election
- 1887 Maryland gubernatorial election
- 1887 Massachusetts gubernatorial election
- 1887 Ohio gubernatorial election
- 1887 Rhode Island gubernatorial election
- 1887 United States gubernatorial elections

==== United States mayoral elections ====
- 1887 Boston mayoral election
- 1887 Chicago mayoral election
- 1887 Philadelphia mayoral election
- 1887 San Diego mayoral election

== Europe ==
- 1887 Bulgarian parliamentary election
- 1887 Croatian parliamentary election
- 1887 Danish Folketing election
- 1887 Dutch general election
- 1887 Faroese general election
- 1887 German federal election
- 1887 Greek parliamentary election
- 1887 Hungarian parliamentary election
- 1887 Luxembourg general election
- 1887 Portuguese legislative election
- 1887 Serbian parliamentary election
- March–April 1887 Swedish general election
- August–September 1887 Swedish general election
- 1887 Swiss federal election

=== United Kingdom ===
- 1887 Basingstoke by-election
- 1887 Brixton by-election
- 1887 Burnley by-election
- 1887 Cambridge University by-election
- 1887 Central Hackney by-election
- 1887 Chesterton by-election
- 1887 City of London by-election
- 1887 Coventry by-election
- 1887 County Carlow by-election
- 1887 Dublin University by-election
- 1887 Dulwich by-election
- 1887 East Donegal by-election
- 1887 Forest of Dean by-election
- 1887 Horncastle by-election
- 1887 Ilkeston by-election
- 1887 Liverpool Exchange by-election
- 1887 North Antrim by-election
- 1887 North Longford by-election
- 1887 North Paddington by-election
- 1887 North West Meath by-election
- 1887 Ramsey by-election
- 1887 South Donegal by-election
- 1887 South Kerry by-election
- 1887 South Sligo by-election
- 1887 Spalding by-election
- 1887 St George's, Hanover Square by-election
- 1887 Taunton by-election

== See also ==
- Category:1887 elections
