= 1886 United States elections =

- ← 1884 1885 1886 1887 1888 → Midterm elections
- Election day: November 2
- Incumbent president: ▌Grover Cleveland (D)
- Next Congress: 50th

Senate elections
- Overall control: Republican hold
- Seats contested: 25 of 76 seats
- Net seat change: Democratic +2
- Results: Democratic gain Democratic hold Republican gain Republican hold Legislature failed to elect

House elections
- Overall control: Democratic hold
- Seats contested: All 325 voting seats
- Net seat change: Republican +11
- Results: Democratic gain Democratic hold Republican gain Republican hold Labor gain Independent gain Greenback hold

Elections occurred in the middle of Democratic President Grover Cleveland's first non-consecutive term, during the Third Party System. Members of the 50th United States Congress were chosen in this election. Democrats retained control of the House, while Republicans retained control of the Senate.

In the House, the Republicans won a moderate number of seats, but the Democrats retained a narrow majority. In the Senate, the Democrats won a moderate number of seats, but the Republicans retained a narrow majority. As of 2026, this is the last time in which the United States had a Democratic President while having a Republican majority in the Senate and a Democratic majority in the House.

== See also ==
- 1886 United States House of Representatives elections
- 1886–87 United States Senate elections
