= 1888 United States elections =

- ← 1886 1887 1888 1889 1890 → Presidential election year
- Election day: November 6
- Incumbent president: ▌Grover Cleveland (D)
- Next Congress: 51st

Presidential election
- Partisan control: Republican gain
- Popular vote margin: Democratic +0.8%
- Electoral vote
- Benjamin Harrison (R): 233
- Grover Cleveland (D): 168
- 1888 presidential election results. Red denotes states won by Harrison, blue denotes states won by Cleveland. Numbers indicate the electoral votes won by each candidate.

Senate elections
- Overall control: Republican hold
- Seats contested: 26 of 76 seats
- Net seat change: Readjuster -1
- Results of the elections: Democratic gain Democratic hold Republican gain Republican hold Legislature failed to elect

House elections
- Overall control: Republican gain
- Seats contested: All 332 voting members
- Net seat change: Republican +27
- Results: Democratic gain Democratic hold Republican gain Republican hold

Elections occurred during the Third Party System, and elected the members of the 51st United States Congress. North Dakota, South Dakota, Montana, Washington, Idaho, and Wyoming were admitted during the 51st Congress. This election was the first time that one party had won a majority in both chambers of Congress since the 1874 elections.

In the presidential election, Democratic President Grover Cleveland was defeated by Republican former Senator Benjamin Harrison of Indiana. At the 1888 Republican National Convention, Harrison was nominated on the eighth ballot, defeating Ohio Senator John Sherman, former Governor Russell A. Alger of Michigan, and several other candidates. As in 1876, the Republican candidate won the presidency despite the Democratic candidate's greater share of the popular vote, albeit with widespread allegations of voter suppression and election fraud aimed at Republican black voters in the Southern United States, also as in 1876. This situation would not be repeated until the 2000 election. Despite the popular vote margin, Harrison won a comfortable majority of the Electoral College and took most of the states outside the Southern United States.

Despite the close presidential race, Republicans picked up several seats in both houses of Congress. Republicans won major gains in the House, retaking the majority for the first time since 1883. In the Senate, the Republicans won major gains, growing their majority in the chamber.

== See also ==
- 1888 United States presidential election
- 1888 United States House of Representatives elections
- 1888–89 United States Senate elections
