= Armistead Green =

American politician (died 1892)

Armistead Green (late 1830s – March 6, 1892) was a state legislator in Virginia. He proposed a bill to repeal the law banning miscegnation in Virginia. He served two terms in the Virginia House of Delegates from 1881–1884.

Green was enslaved. He worked in a tobacco factory and became a grocery store owner. He co-owned a mortuary. He made headlines criticizing Virginia congressman John S. Wise for saying he would meet Black General Assembly members in the backyard and not the parlor.

He died of Bright's Disease.
