= 1884 United States elections =

- ← 1882 1883 1884 1885 1886 → Presidential election year
- Election day: November 4
- Incumbent president: ▌Chester A. Arthur (R)
- Next Congress: 49th

Presidential election
- Partisan control: Democratic gain
- Popular vote margin: Democratic +0.6%
- Electoral vote
- Grover Cleveland (D): 219
- James G. Blaine (R): 182
- 1884 presidential election results. Red denotes states won by Blaine, blue denotes states won by Cleveland. Numbers indicate the electoral votes won by each candidate.

Senate elections
- Overall control: Republican hold
- Seats contested: 27 of 76 seats
- Net seat change: Democratic -2
- Results: Republican gain Republican hold Democratic hold Legislature failed to elect

House elections
- Overall control: Democratic hold
- Seats contested: All 325 voting members
- Net seat change: Republican +24
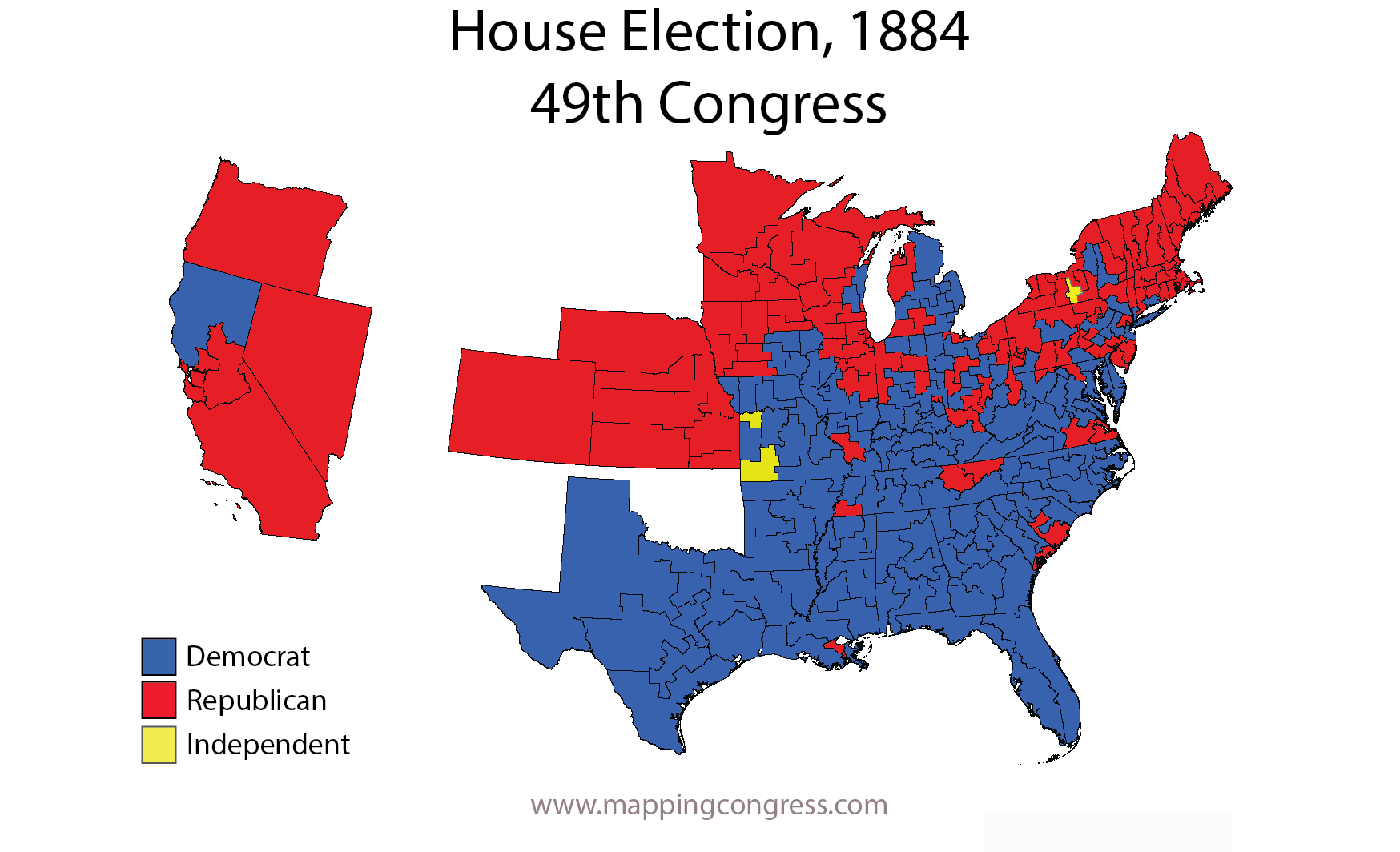
- 1884 House of Representatives election results Democratic seat Republican seat Independent seat

Elections were held on November 4, 1884, electing the members of the 49th United States Congress. The election took place during the Third Party System. The Democratic governor Grover Cleveland of New York defeated the Republican secretary of state James G. Blaine in the presidential election. In Congress, the Republicans retained control of the Senate while the Democrats maintained control of the House of Representatives. This marks the last election in U.S. history in which the Democratic president came to office without a unified control of Congress.

In the presidential election, the Democratic governor Grover Cleveland of New York defeated the Republican former secretary of state James G. Blaine. Though Cleveland won the popular vote by less than 1%, he won by a fairly comfortable margin in the electoral college. Cleveland won the Southern United States and the critical state of New York, while Blaine took most of the rest of the country. This was the most recent example of an incumbent president being denied nomination by his party for another term, as Blaine defeated President Chester A. Arthur at the 1884 Republican National Convention. Cleveland took the Democratic nomination on the second ballot of the 1884 Democratic National Convention, defeating the Delaware senator Thomas F. Bayard and several other candidates. Cleveland's win made him the first Democratic president to win an election since the 1856 election, although Andrew Johnson served out Abraham Lincoln's term from 1865 to 1869.

Republicans picked up several seats in the House, but Democrats continued to command a majority in the chamber. In the Senate, Republicans made moderate gains and established a clear majority.

This marks one of four occasions where a newly elected president entered office with a divided legislature, occurring again in 1860, 1876, and 1980. 1860 is the only other occasion where the president's party held the House, but not the Senate. A divided Congress also occurred after the 1984 and 2012 elections.

== See also ==
- 1884 United States presidential election
- 1884 United States House of Representatives elections
- 1884–85 United States Senate elections
