= Thomas J. Anderson (judge) =

American judge (1837–1910)

- Born: March 4, 1837
- Died: April 13, 1910 (aged 73)
- Occupation: Judge

Thomas J. Anderson (March 4, 1837 – April 13, 1910) was a justice of the Territorial Utah Supreme Court from 1889 to 1893.

Born in Illinois, and descended from "an early Virginia family composed of French Hugenots and English", Anderson moved with his family to Iowa in 1853, and received his education there. While working as a school teacher, he read law to gain admission to the bar in 1860, and began practicing in Knoxville, Iowa. He was also an editor of the newspaper, the Democratic Standard. On August 15, 1862, he joined the Union Army to serve in the American Civil War, achieving the rank of major and serving as a judge advocate general. He was described as being "considered a self-made man". At various points in the 1870s and 1880s, he ran for judicial, legislative, and executive positions, including being the Democratic nominee for governor in the 1887 Iowa gubernatorial election, and for the United States Senate in the 1888 United States Senate election in Iowa.

After obtaining an appointment to the office of the assistant commissioner of the general land, Anderson was appointed to the Utah Supreme Court by President Grover Cleveland on January 14, 1889, on the recommendation of the entire Democratic and Republican delegation of Iowa. Benjamin Harrison took office in March of that year, he replaced two other Cleveland-appointed judges, but did not replace Anderson. In November 1889, Anderson denied citizenship applications sought by a number of immigrants to the United States "simply because they were members of the Mormon church", a controversial decision. Anderson remained on the court until 1893, when Harrison appointed George Washington Barch to succeed him.

Anderson remained in Utah until 1906, when he went to live in the Soldiers' Home in Sawtelle, California, where he died at the age of 73.

Party political offices
Preceded by Charles E. Whiting	Democratic nominee for Governor of Iowa; 1887	Succeeded by Horace Boies
Political offices
Preceded by Jacob S. Boreman	Justice of the Utah Territorial Supreme Court; 1889–1893	Succeeded by George Washington Barch
