= Daniel Maynadier Henry =

American politician

Member of the U.S. House of Representatives from Maryland's 1st district
- In office March 4, 1877 – March 3, 1881
- Preceded by: Philip Francis Thomas
- Succeeded by: George Washington Covington

Personal details
- Born: February 19, 1823 Cambridge, Maryland, U.S.
- Died: August 31, 1899 (aged 76) Cambridge, Maryland, U.S.
- Resting place: Christ Protestant Episcopal Church Cemetery
- Party: Democratic
- Children: Winder Laird Henry
- Relatives: Henry Lloyd (nephew)
- Education: St. John's College

Daniel Maynadier Henry (February 19, 1823 – August 31, 1899) was an American politician.

== Early life ==
Henry was born near Cambridge, Maryland, and attended Cambridge Academy and St. John's College of Annapolis, Maryland. He studied law, was admitted to the bar in 1844, and practiced in Cambridge.

== Career ==
Henry began his political career as a member of the Maryland House of Delegates in 1846, and again later in 1849. He also served in the Maryland State Senate in 1869. In 1876, Henry was elected as a Democrat to the Forty-fifth, and in 1878 to the Forty-sixth Congresses, serving from March 4, 1877, to March 3, 1881. During the forty-sixth congress, he served as chairman of the Committee on Accounts.

After his tenure in Congress, Henry continued the practice of law until his death.

== Personal life ==
He was the uncle of Maryland Governor Henry Lloyd.

== Death ==
Henry died in Cambridge. He is interred in Christ Protestant Episcopal Church Cemetery.

U.S. House of Representatives
Preceded by Philip Thomas	Member of the U.S. House of Representatives from Maryland's 1st congressional district March 4, 1877 – March 3, 1881	Succeeded by George Washington Covington
