= Pemberton Hall (Salisbury, Maryland) =

Historic house in Maryland, United States

- U.S. National Register of Historic Places
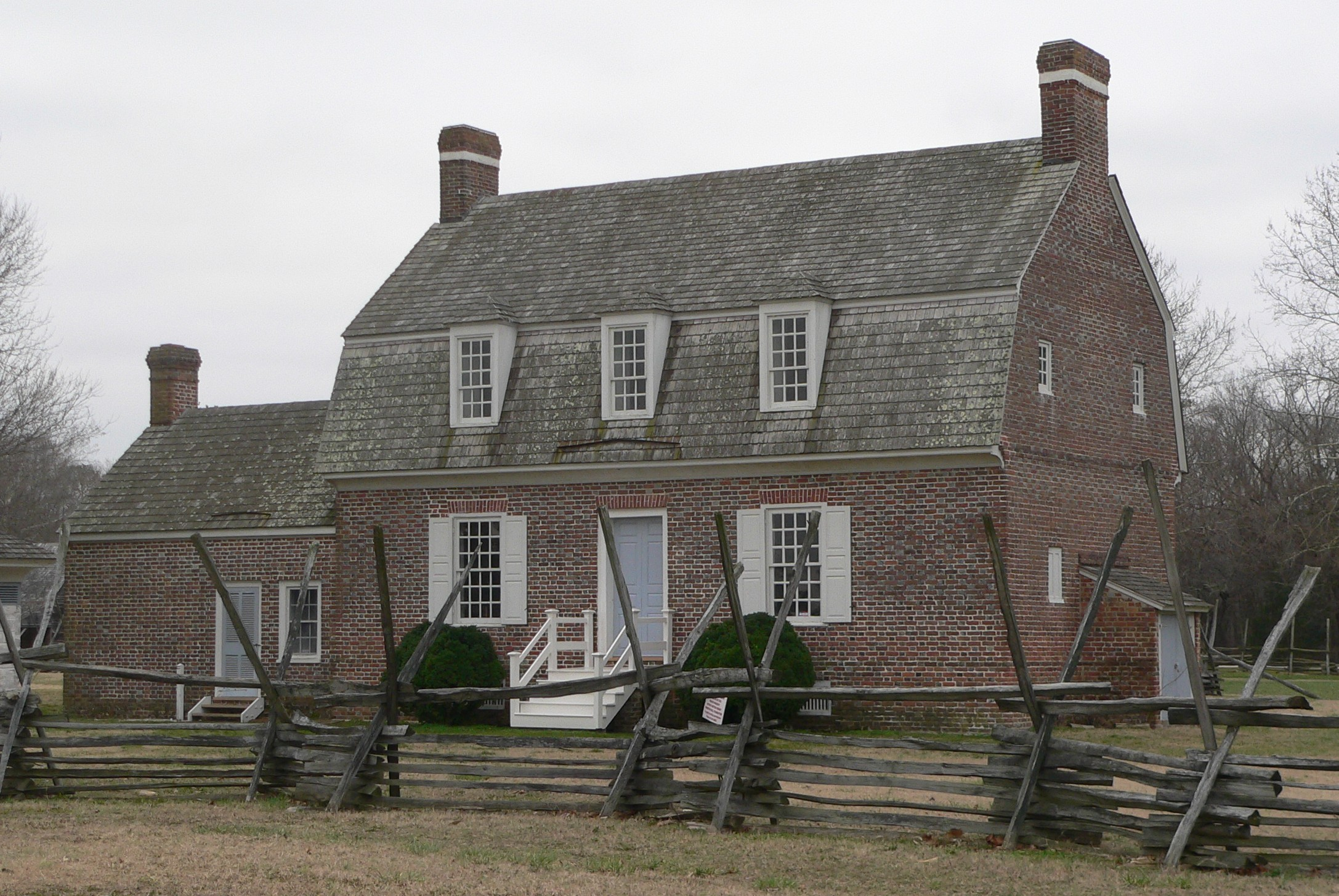

- Location within Maryland Location within the United States
- Location: Pemberton Rd., Salisbury, Maryland
- Coordinates: 38.347728°N 75.644573°W
- Area: 560 acres (230 ha)
- Built: 1741
- NRHP reference No.: 71000379
- Added to NRHP: February 18, 1971

Pemberton Hall is a historic home located at Pemberton Park in Salisbury, Wicomico County, Maryland, United States. It is a 1 1/2-story, three-bay, Flemish bond brick house with a gambrel roof. The construction date of "1741" is scratched in a brick above the side door.

Pemberton Hall was built by Col. Isaac Handy (d. 1762).

During the American Civil War, the Hall was the home of Allison Parsons, a Southern sympathizer. Despite the Federal troops encamped in Salisbury, Parsons insisted on firing a cannon upon the receipt of news of each Confederate victory. After Parsons ignored orders to cease the firings, U.S. Army soldiers raided Pemberton Hall intent on silencing the cannon. Their efforts were thwarted by Parsons, who had buried the cannon before their arrival. "In addition to the cannon firing which provoked the raid, Parsons used Pemberton Hall as a rendezvous for Eastern Shore Confederate sympathizers.".

In 1868, the Governor of Maryland, Elihu E. Jackson (1837–1907), purchased Pemberton Hall with James Cannon at a trustee's sale.

Seth Taylor owned Pemberton Hall from 1931 to 1963, at which time the Pemberton Hall Foundation took it over and restored the house.

It was listed on the National Register of Historic Places in 1971.
