= Walter B. Brooks =

American politician and businessman (1823–1896)

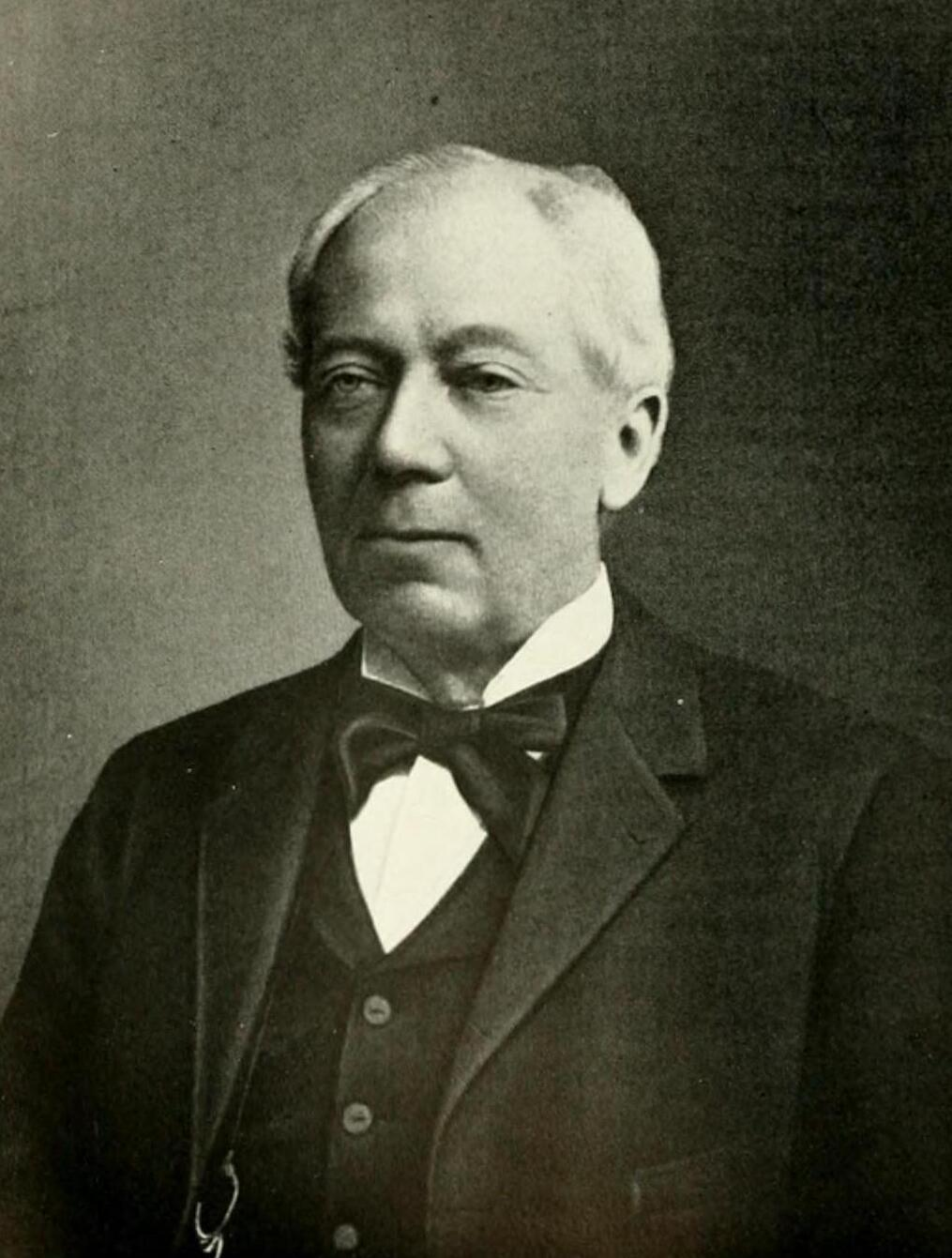
- Portrait of Brooks in a 1912 publication
- Born: Walter Booth Brooks; May 27, 1823; Baltimore, Maryland, U.S.
- Died: January 17, 1896 (aged 72); Baltimore, Maryland, U.S.
- Resting place: Green Mount Cemetery
- Occupations: Politician; businessman
- Political party: Republican
- Spouse: Caroline Cole (m. 1852)
- Children: 4

Walter Booth Brooks (May 27, 1823 – January 17, 1896) was an American politician and businessman from Maryland. He was the Republican nominee for the governor of Maryland in 1887.

== Early life ==
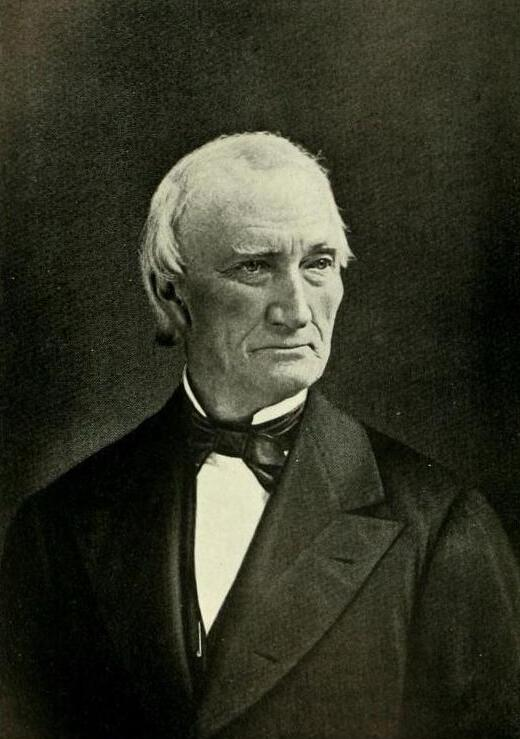
Portrait of Chauncey Brooks, father of Walter B. Brooks

Walter Booth Brooks was born on May 27, 1823, in Baltimore, Maryland, to Marilla (née Phelps) and Chauncey Brooks. He was named after General Walter Booth, a business partner of his father. His father had English heritage and was president of the Baltimore and Ohio Railroad. His mother was of the Gaylord line that emigrated from England and her grandfather Aaron Gaylord died at the Battle of Wyoming. Brooks attended a private school in Connecticut.

== Career ==
Brooks worked at his father's wholesale dry goods store. In 1844, he became a partner with his father and Derick Fahnestock in C. Brooks, Son & Company. The business was renamed after six years to Brooks, Fahnestock & Company. The firm's warehouse was on Baltimore Street, between Eutaw Place and Howard Street. At the outbreak of the Civil War, with their Southern portion of the business cut-off, Brooks opened a branch in Zanesville, Ohio, Fahnestock took care of the business in Maryland and Pennsylvania, and his father served as president of the Baltimore and Ohio Railroad. In 1865, he withdrew from his father's firm and the business in Ohio became W. B. Brooks & Company. He left Zanesville in 1867 and returned to Baltimore.

After returning to Baltimore, Brooks took over a couple of failing businesses, including a dry goods firm called Howard Cole & Company and coffee and sugar importer firm called Kirkland, Chase & Company He also managed Stirling, Ahrens & Co. In 1877, he replaced Charles J. Baker as president of the Canton Company. The company was a real estate company based in east Baltimore. He remained as its president until 1896. He was a director and large stockholder in the Western National Bank, director of Eutaw Savings Bank, the Safe Deposit and Trust Company, the Consolidated Gas Company, the Howard Fire Insurance Company, and the Central Ohio Railroad.

In 1880, Brooks helped incorporate the Merchants' Club on German Street in Baltimore. He later served as its president after its re-organization in 1885. The club had a membership of more than 600 merchants. In 1887, he was the Republican nominee for governor of Maryland. His bid was supported by independent Democrats, including John K. Cowen. He lost the election by 12,416 votes to Elihu Emory Jackson.

== Personal life ==
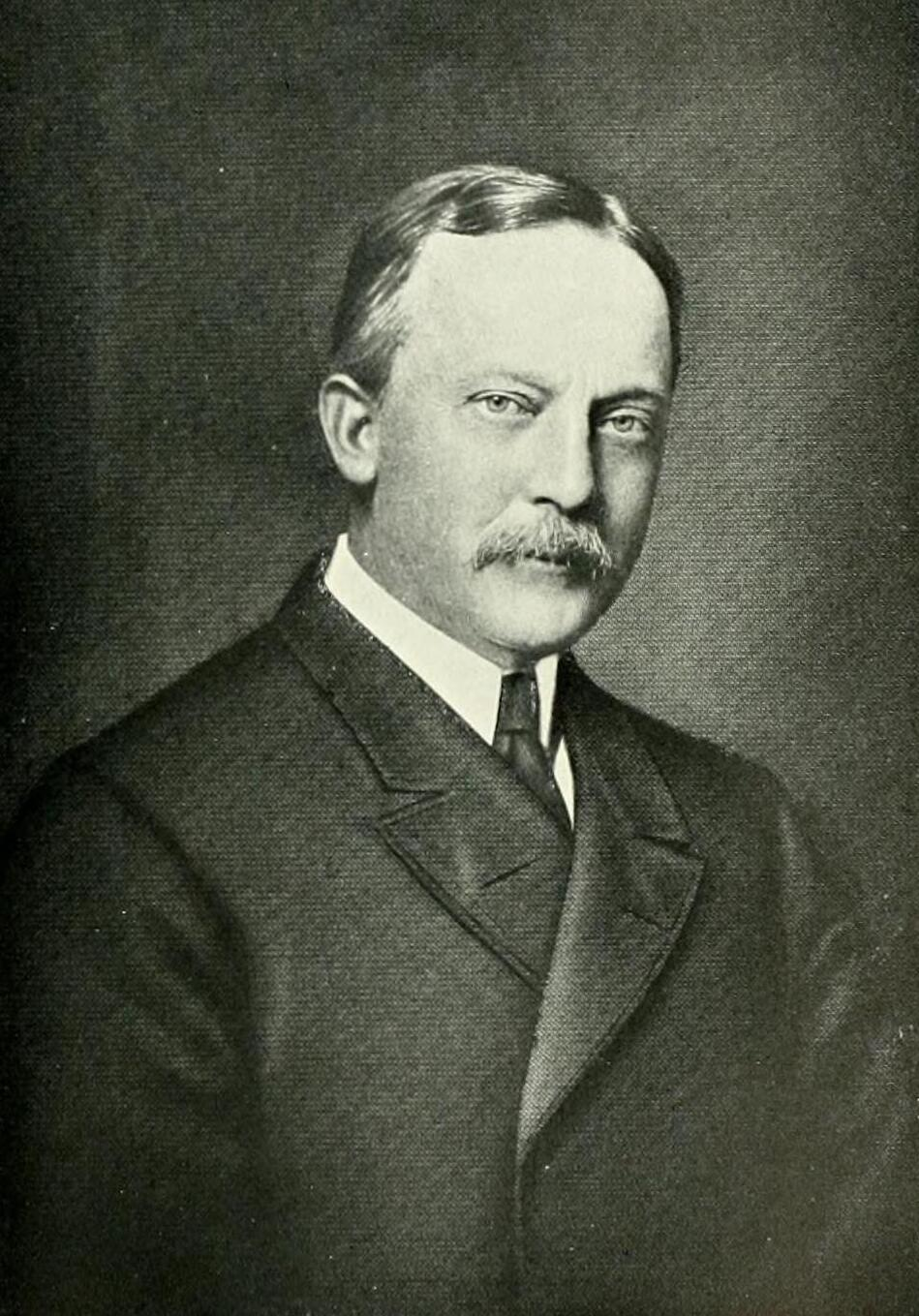
Portrait of his son Walter

Brooks married Caroline Cole, a daughter of Abram G. Cole, in 1852. They had four children, Chauncey, Walter B. Jr., Eleanor, and Caroline. His son Walter Jr. succeeded him as president of the Canton Company and was associated with the American Red Cross. His son Walter Jr. married Louise Cromwell. His daughter Eleanor married William Grigsby McCormick.

Brooks was a member and trustee of Brown Memorial Presbyterian Church. His Cloverfield home was a large brick colonial mansion near the east entrance of Druid Hill Park on Eutaw Place. After his father's death in 1880, he took ownership of the mansion. He died on January 17, 1896, at his Cloverfield home in Baltimore. He was buried in Green Mount Cemetery.

Party political offices
Preceded by Hart Benton Holton	Republican nominee for Governor of Maryland; 1887	Succeeded by William J. Vannort
