= Christ Episcopal Church and Cemetery (Cambridge, Maryland) =

Historic church in Maryland, US

- U.S. National Register of Historic Places
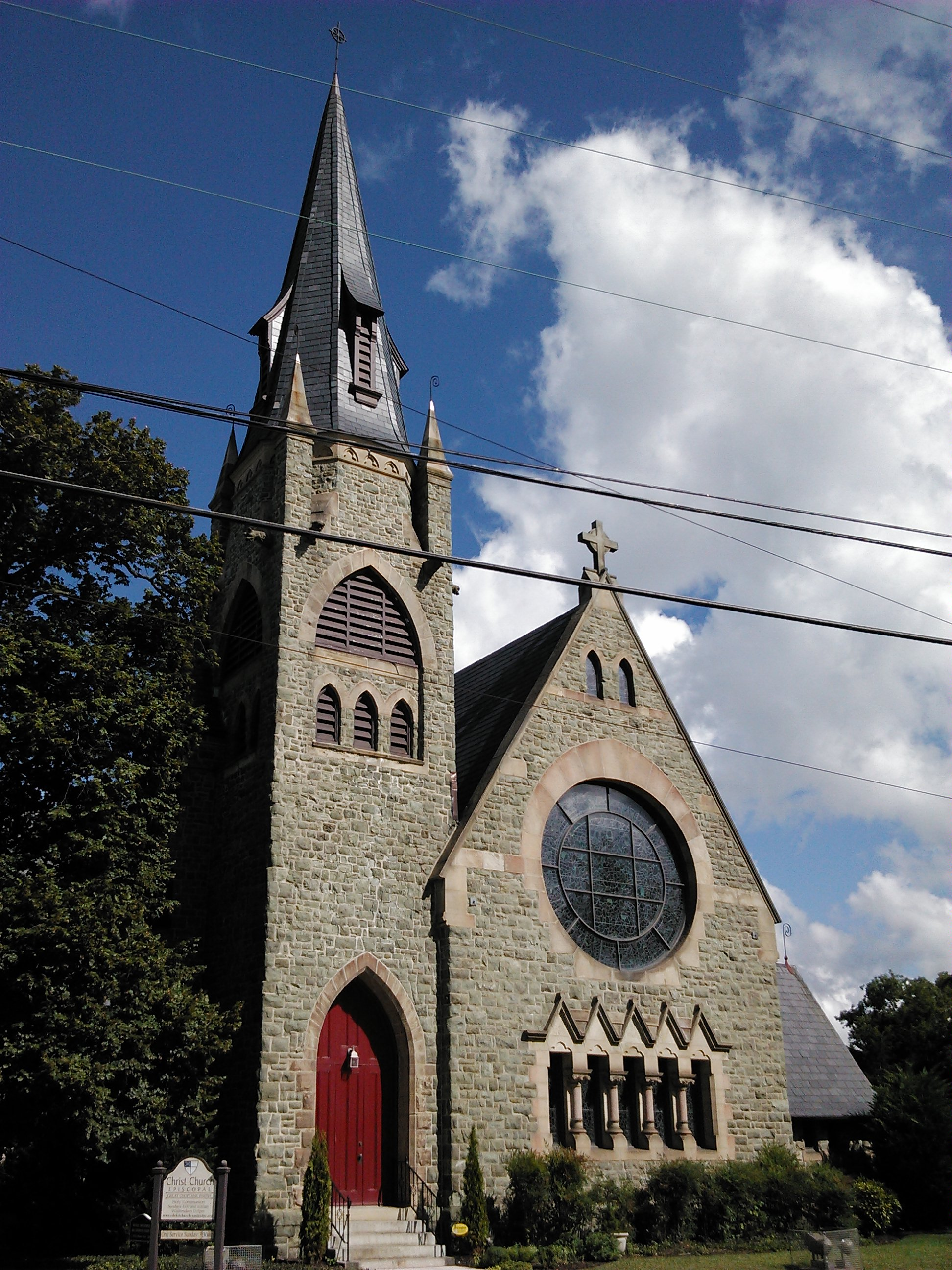
- Christ Episcopal Church in 2014

- Location within Maryland Location within the United States
- Location: 601 Church St., Cambridge, Maryland U.S.A.
- Coordinates: 38°34′19″N 76°4′36″W
- Area: 2 acres (0.81 ha)
- Built: 1883
- Architect: Cassell, Charles F.
- Architectural style: Gothic Revival
- NRHP reference No.: 84001767
- Added to NRHP: April 12, 1984

Christ Episcopal Church and Cemetery is an historic Episcopal church and cemetery located at Cambridge, Dorchester County, Maryland, United States.

== History ==
Christ Church is the parish church of Great Choptank Parish, founded in 1692 as one of the List of original 30 Anglican parishes in the Province of Maryland.

The church structure, designed by noted Baltimore architect Charles E. Cassell and built between 1883 and 1884, is a large Gothic Revival stone structure of green serpentinite stone on a cruciform plan. The adjoining cemetery is enclosed on three sides by a brick wall, and burials therein date from 1674 to the present. Church parishioners included five governors of Maryland, a state Attorney General, an Ambassador to the Netherlands, local judges and lawyers and several U.S. Congressmen, where most are buried.

Christ Episcopal Church and Cemetery was listed on the National Register of Historic Places in 1984.

== Notable interments ==
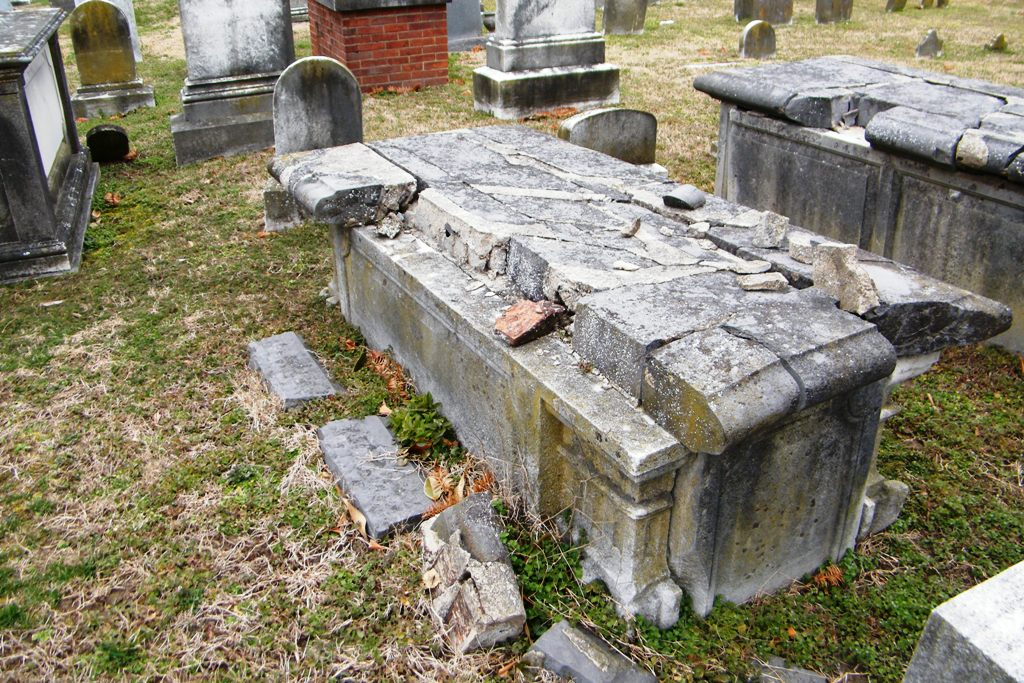
18th century burial at Christ Episcopal Church

=== Maryland governors ===
- John Henry (1797–98)
- Charles Goldsborough (1819)
- Henry Lloyd (1885–88)
- Phillips Lee Goldsborough (1912–16)
- Emerson C. Harrington (1916–20).

=== Other ===
- Robert Goldsborough – delegate to the Continental Congress.
- William A. Sulivane – State Boundary Commissioner for Dorchester County (appointed 1865). Grandson of James Sulivane.
- Congressman Daniel Maynadier Henry
