= George W. Covington =

American politician

George Washington Covington (September 12, 1838 – April 6, 1911) was an American politician.

Covington was born in Berlin, Maryland, and attended the common schools as a youth. He pursued a higher education at Buckingham Academy, and later at Harvard Law School. In 1861, he was admitted to the bar and commenced practiced in Berlin and Snow Hill, Maryland.

Covington served as a member of the state constitutional convention in 1867, and was elected as a Democrat to the Forty-seventh and Forty-eighth Congresses, serving from March 4, 1881, to March 3, 1885. During the forty-eighth Congress, Covington served as chairman of the Committee on Accounts. He was not a candidate for renomination in 1884, and resumed the practice of law in Snow Hill. He died in New York City in 1911, and is interred in All Hallows Cemetery in Snow Hill.

== Covington interconnections ==
There is another George Washington Covington, a wealthy merchant and resident of Still Pond, Maryland, alive at the same time. This Covington died in 1917.

These facts may be helpful:

They were born within four years and died within six years of each other.

The better-known G.W. stakes his claim on being elected twice to Congress from Maryland's 1st congressional district. Born in September 1838 in Berlin in Worcester County, he was schooled at Buckingham Academy and Harvard University law school, and began practicing in Worcester County in 1861. He was a delegate to Maryland's 1867 constitutional convention.

In the 1880 census, he was living in Snow Hill with his wife Sallie B. Soon after he was in Congress, from March 4, 1881 to March 3, 1885. A Democrat, he went back to life as a country lawyer in Snow Hill, and died in New York City April 6, 1911.

The other is George Washington Covington of Still Pond, Kent County, Md. The store he built in 1870 still stands.

Born in Middletown, Del., in 1834, he became a Kent County storekeeper by way of Baltimore, and lived in Still Pond most of his long life.

According to his obituary in The Enterprise, Feb. 7, 1917, "Geo. W. Covington, a prominent druggist of Still Pond, died on Wednesday (Jan. 31) afternoon age 83 years. He was born at Middletown, Del., in 1834 and was the son of Nathaniel and Maria Covington. He came to Still Pond in 1851 and entered the store of Daniel Haines. A few years later he opened one of the best drug stores in the county. About 1861 he married Miss Helen Busick. Mr. Covington leaves three children, Miss Helen of this county; Mrs. W.L. Barnard of New York; Careton [sic] Covington, of Phila.; two children Mrs. J. Cougill Alston and Lester Covington are deceased.

"Funeral services were held Saturday at 11 a.m., interment in Still Pond Cemetery. He was a member of the M.E. Church. Bearers were Judge J. Harry Covington, Dr. W.E. Barnard, J. Congill [sic] Alston, Harry Busick, Howard Turner, H.C. Cacy."

The 1830 census shows Nathaniel Covington, head of family in St. Georges Hundred, Del. He apparently moved here by 1840, since a Nathaniel Covington pops up in the census that year.

By 1850, George W. Covington, 16, and James H. Covington, 14, were living in Baltimore's 15th Ward. The head of household was Daniel Haines, 34, and wife Sarah Haines, 35, both born in Delaware. Their daughter Hilda was 3.

It was a large household. Esther Haines, 21; Jane Lee, 40, black and probably a servant; and Boris (?) Lecompte, 1 year old, all born in Maryland, lived there.

So did Maryland-born Henry J. Strandberg, 34, "sea captain", and a woman who may have been a wife or sister, Susannah Strandberg, 38, born in Delaware.

Strandberg had Chestertown, Maryland ties. His father, Carl Strandberg was a prominent Chestertown resident, a baker and businessman, who in 1828 had his name changed from Charles Stanley. At the same time, Charles Stanley Jr. became Charles Strandberg. Henry, Maria Charlotte and Eliza Stanley all became Strandbergs.

In the 1850 census, in Chestertown, elderly Carl Strandberg was living with Maria (28), Daniel (9) and Ann (5) Haines.

By 1860, the census shows George and Helen Covington in Still Pond. He is a Merchant worth $2,500, with no real estate. (The 1880 census gives 1859 as the year they married). Also there was 18-year-old clerk Daniel Haines, the same Daniel who had been in the Strandberg Chestertown household in 1850.

N.T. Hynson lived just west of the village. It was a one-acre slice of Hynson's land at the "cross roads" that Covington bought in March, 1862. The cost for "land and premises" was $400. From the deed it appears there was some kind of structure already.

Typical of the time, the property description reads, "Beginning at a stone set opposite the back door of the black Smith's Shop...." There were easements on two sides for public roads.

U.S. House of Representatives
Preceded by Daniel Maynadier Henry	Member of the U.S. House of Representatives from Maryland's 1st congressional district March 4, 1881 – March 3, 1885	Succeeded by Charles Hopper Gibson
