= Pemberton Park =

- Location: Maryland
- Nearest city: Salisbury

Site notes
- Website: https://www.pembertonpark.org/

Pemberton Park is a 262-acre park and former plantation located in Wicomico County, Maryland that encompasses Pemberton Hall.

== History ==
In 1726, Colonel Isaac Handy purchased 960 acres of undeveloped land from Joseph Pemberton. In 1741, Handy built Pemberton Hall. Handy died in 1762. At the time of his death, he owned 1,500 acres of plantation land and 16 slaves. In 1961, the building was purchased and restored by the Pemberton Hall Foundation. In the 1980s, Wicomico County created a 260-acre park surrounding the house.

Also on the property are slaves quarters, a milk house, a well, and a well sweep. A submerged wharf, the Mulberry's Landing Wharf, was discovered on the property through underwater archeology and dendrochronology. The wharf was built in 1747 and is the oldest documented bulkhead wharf in the United States.

In 2019, the Natural Resources Conservation Advisory Committee of Wicomico County began removing Japanese knotweed from the park, which is an invasive species.

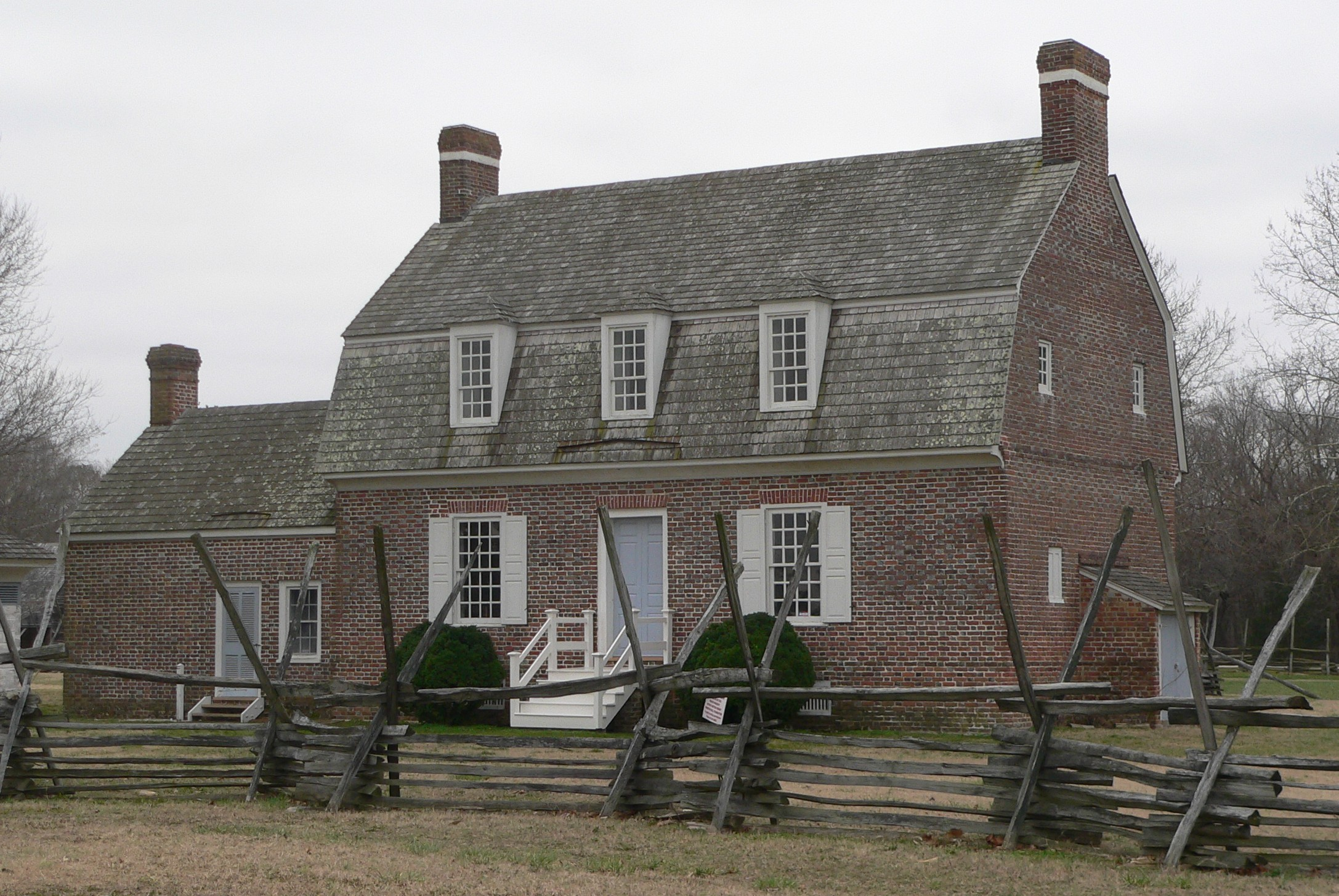

=== Pemberton Hall ===
After it was built in 1741, Pemberton Hall continued to have tenants until the 1960s. An attached kitchen was added to the house in 1786. The last tenant, Seth Taylor, owned Pemberton Hall from 1931 to 1963 Pemberton Hall was then purchased and restored by the Pemberton Hall Foundation.
