= Robert Goldsborough =

American politician

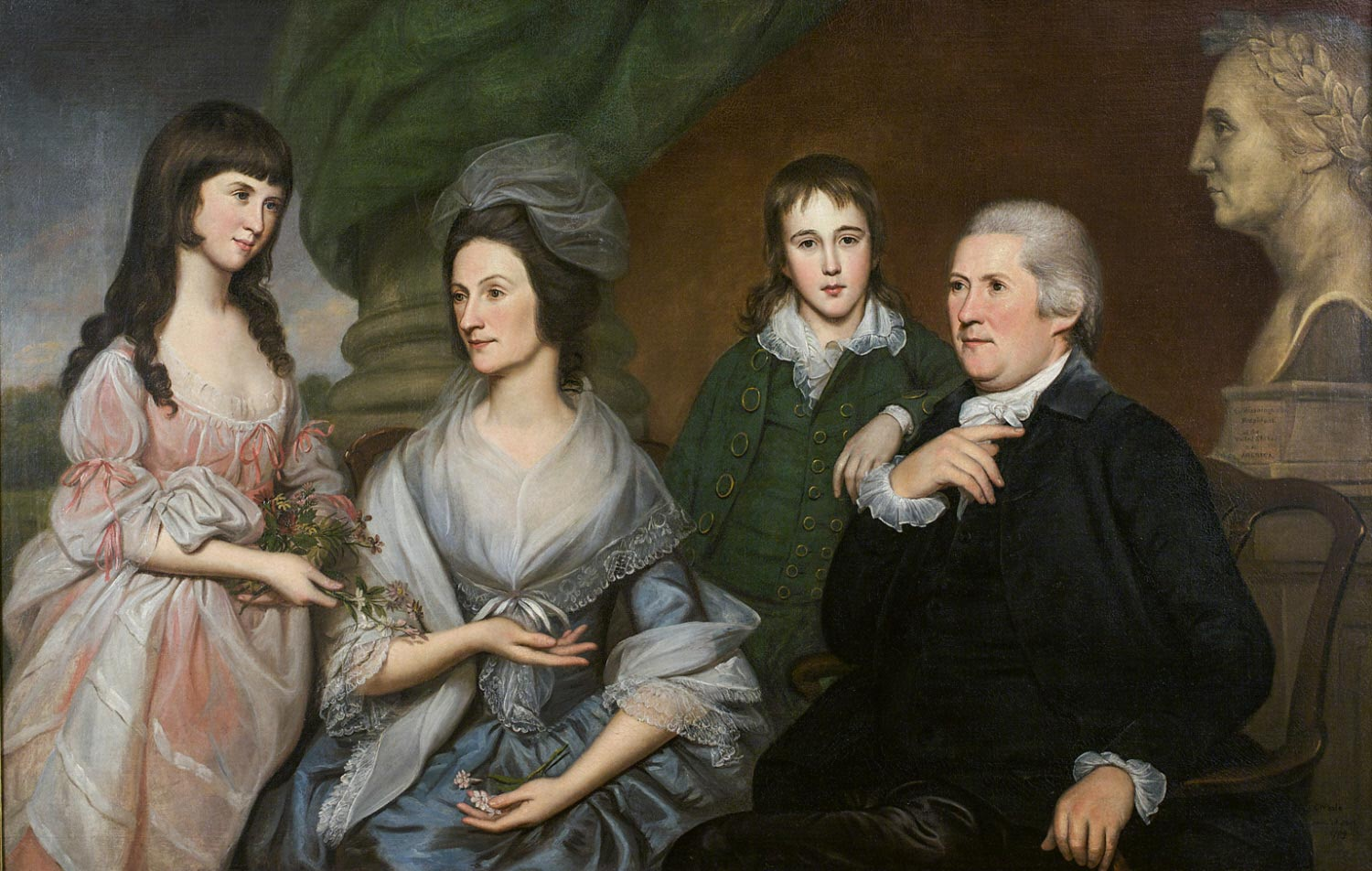
- Robert Goldsborough, 1733 - 1788 Mary Emerson Trippe Goldsborough, born mid 18th Century Elizabeth Greenberry Goldsborough, 1776 - 1798 Robert Henry Goldsborough, 1779 - 1836
- Born: December 3, 1733; Cambridge, Province of Maryland, British America
- Died: December 22, 1788; Dorchester County, Maryland, U.S.
- Resting place: Cambridge Court; Dorchester County, Maryland, U.S.
- Education: Middle Temple; University of Pennsylvania
- Occupation: Politician
- Spouse: Sarah Yerbury (m. 1755)
- Children: 11, including Robert
- Father: Charles Goldsborough

Robert Goldsborough (December 3, 1733 – December 22, 1788) was an American lawyer and statesman from Maryland. He served as a delegate to the Continental Congress.

== Early life ==
Robert Goldsborough was the son of Elizabeth (née Ennalls) and Charles Goldsborough. and was born on the family estate (Horns Point) at Cambridge in Dorchester County, Province of Maryland on December 3, 1733. His father owned over 10,000 acres (40 km^{2}) of land, and became a member of the Governor's Council in 1760. As a young man Robert travelled to London to study law at the Middle Temple and graduated in December 1752, where he was admitted to the bar in February 1757. He remained there practicing law as a Barrister until 1759 when he returned to America. He attended the Philadelphia College (now the University of Pennsylvania), and graduated in 1760 before resuming the practice of law in Cambridge, Maryland.

== Personal life ==
Goldsborough married Sarah Yerbury on March 27, 1755, in England. He had eleven children: Charles, Rebecca, Sarah, Elizabeth, Charles, William, John, Robert, Richard, Rachel, John, and Howes.

== Career ==
Goldsborough was the sheriff of Dorchester County from 1761 to 1764. He began his service in the Maryland Assembly in 1765, and served as the colony's Attorney General from 1766 to 1768. He became active in the protests that led to the American Revolution, joining Maryland's "Committee of Safety". In 1774 he was sent as a delegate to the Continental Congress, where he served until May 1776. Later that year he attended the Convention that drafted Maryland's first state constitution. Under the new state constitution, he was elected to the first Maryland Senate in 1777.

Robert narrowly missed two chances to be listed formally as one of the Founding Fathers of the United States. He withdrew from the Continental Congress six weeks before the Declaration of Independence to return home and work towards Maryland's first constitution. In 1787, he was selected as a representative to attend the U.S. Constitutional Convention, but didn't attend due to poor health. He died the following year at home at Horns Point, and is buried in the Christ Episcopal Church Cemetery in Cambridge, Maryland.

He was elected posthumously to the American Philosophical Society in 1791.

== Death ==
Goldsborough died on December 22, 1788, in Dorchester County. He was buried at Cambridge Court in Dorchester County.
