= Fitzhugh Lee =

American general and politician (1835–1905)

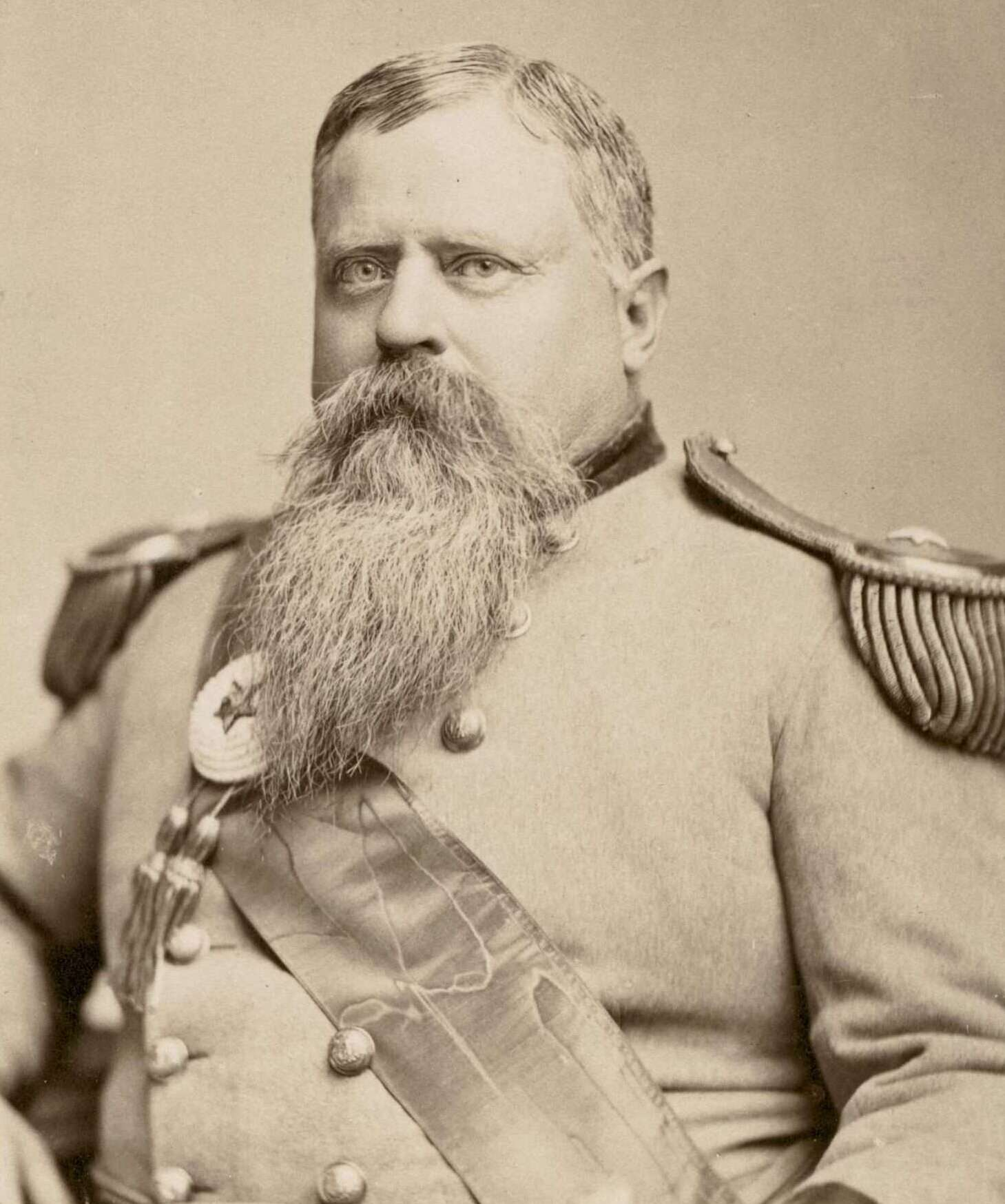
- Lee in 1885

40th Governor of Virginia
- In office January 1, 1886 – January 1, 1890
- Lieutenant: John E. Massey
- Preceded by: William E. Cameron
- Succeeded by: Philip W. McKinney

Personal details
- Born: November 19, 1835 Fairfax County, Virginia, U.S.
- Died: April 28, 1905 (aged 69) Washington, D.C., U.S.
- Resting place: Hollywood Cemetery (Richmond, Virginia)
- Spouse: Ellen Bernard Fowle (m. 1871)
- Children: 5
- Relatives: See Lee family
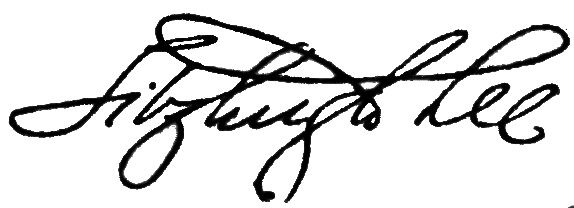
- Signature
- Nickname: Flea

Military service
- Allegiance: United States; Confederate States
- Branch/service: United States Army; Confederate States Army
- Years of service: 1856–1861, 1898–1901 (USA); 1861–1865 (CSA)
- Rank: Major General (USA); Major General (CSA)
- Battles/wars: American Civil War; Spanish–American War

Fitzhugh Lee (November 19, 1835 – April 28, 1905) was an American Confederate cavalry general in the American Civil War, the 40th Governor of Virginia, diplomat, and United States Army general in the Spanish–American War. He was a descendant of the Lee Family of Virginia - the son of Sydney Smith Lee, a captain in the Confederate States Navy, and the nephew of Robert E. Lee.

== Early life and education ==
Lee Family Coat of Arms

Lee was born on November 19, 1835, at Clermont in Fairfax County, Virginia. He was the grandson of "Light Horse Harry" Lee, a nephew of Robert E. Lee and Samuel Cooper, and cousin of George Washington Custis Lee, W.H.F. "Rooney" Lee, and Robert E. Lee, Jr. His father, Sydney Smith Lee, served under Commodore Perry in Japanese waters and rose to the rank of Captain; his mother, Anna Maria Mason Lee, was a granddaughter of George Mason and the sister of James Murray Mason. He attended St. Timothy's Hall in Catonsville, Maryland.

Lee attended the United States Military Academy at West Point, New York, where he graduated in 1856. At West Point, he would sign his name as "F. Lee", which lead to the nickname "Flea". He was commissioned a second lieutenant in the 2nd Cavalry Regiment (later redesignated the 5th Cavalry Regiment), which was commanded by Colonel Albert Sidney Johnston, and in which his uncle, Robert E. Lee, was lieutenant colonel. As a cavalry subaltern, he distinguished himself by his gallant conduct in actions against the Comanches in Texas and was severely wounded in a fight in Nescutunga, Texas, in May 1859. In May 1860, he was appointed instructor of cavalry tactics at the U.S. Military Academy, but resigned his commission after Virginia declared secession and alliance with the Confederacy at the beginning of the American Civil War.

== American Civil War ==
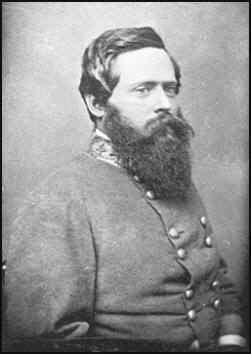
Lee during the American Civil War

Fitzhugh Lee joined the Confederate States Army as a lieutenant of cavalry and served at first as a staff officer to Brig. Gen. Richard Stoddert Ewell at the First Battle of Manassas. He was promoted to lieutenant colonel of the 1st Virginia Cavalry in September 1861, serving under Colonel "Grumble" Jones. Lee replaced Jones in March 1862, after the elections held in the regiment in accordance with the Confederate Conscripion Act of April 16, 1862. He was promoted to brigadier general on July 24, 1862.

During the Northern Virginia Campaign, Fitzhugh Lee received notoriety by arriving late for a cavalry concentration, allowing U.S. Army cavalry to raid Jeb Stuart's headquarters and capture his famous plumed hat and cape. However, during the subsequent Confederate raid on Catlett's Station, he captured the headquarters tent and dress uniform of U.S. Maj. Gen. John Pope. Fitzhugh Lee gave Pope's coat to Stuart as compensation for the hat he had lost.

Fitzhugh Lee performed well in the Maryland Campaign of 1862, covering the Confederate infantry's withdrawal from South Mountain, delaying the U.S. Army advance to Sharpsburg, Maryland, before the Battle of Sharpsburg around Antietam Creek, and covering his army's recrossing of the Potomac River into Virginia. Stuart's cavalry made its second ride around the U.S. Army in the Chambersburg Raid before returning in time to screen Robert E. Lee's movement towards Fredericksburg, where the cavalry defended the extreme right of the Confederate line. Fitzhugh Lee's brigade would play a role in the December 27-29, 1862 Christmas Raids of Union supply depots in Virginia. Fitzhugh Lee conducted the cavalry action of Kelly's Ford (March 17, 1863) with skill and success, where his 400 troopers captured 150 men and horses with a loss of only 14 men. In the Battle of Chancellorsville in May 1863, Lee's reconnaissance found that the U.S. Army's right flank was "in the air", which allowed the successful flanking attack by Maj. Gen. Thomas Jonathan "Stonewall" Jackson, a movement led by Fitzhugh Lee's cavalry.

After Chancellorsville, Lee was incapacitated by inflammatory rheumatism, missing a month of action, which included the significant cavalry operations at the Battle of Brandy Station. He recovered in time to lead a brigade in Jeb Stuart's third ride around the U.S. Army, in the early days of the Gettysburg campaign, with his most significant contribution being at the Battle of Carlisle. During the Battle of Gettysburg, his brigade fought unsuccessfully at East Cavalry Field. Stuart's report singled out no officer in his command for praise except Fitz Lee, who he said was "one of the finest cavalry leaders on the continent, and richly [entitled] to promotion." During the withdrawal from Gettysburg, Lee's brigade held the fords at Shepherdstown to prevent the U.S. Army from following across the Potomac River. Lee was promoted to major general on August 3, 1863, and continued to serve under Maj. Gen. Stuart's command, despite Stuart not receiving a promotion following his questionable conduct in the Gettysburg Campaign. While his uncle maneuvered the Army of Northern Virginia back into central Virginia, Lee's division launched a successful ambush on U.S. Army cavalry at the Battle of Buckland Mills that fall.

In the Overland Campaign the following spring, Lee was constantly employed as a divisional commander under Stuart. Following the Battle of the Wilderness, Lee's cavalry division played a pivotal role in impeding the U.S. Army in its race to the Battle of Spotsylvania Court House. While fighting at Spotsylvania, Gen. Stuart was detached from the army to thwart U.S. cavalry commander Phillip Sheridan's raid on Richmond. Stuart took Fitzhugh Lee's division with him. The mission ultimately ended in the mortal wounding of Gen. Stuart at the Battle of Yellow Tavern and Lee's inability to break through the United States Colored Troops' defense of Fort Pocahontas in Charles City County and Fort Powhatan in Prince George County. After Stuart's death, Lee served under Maj. Gen. Wade Hampton. Hampton, who had been Lee's peer for much of the war, was promoted to replace Stuart due to his seniority and more significant experience; some observers at the time had cynically expected Robert E. Lee's nephew to receive the command.

At the Battle of Trevilian Station, Hampton's cavalry prevented Gen. Sheridan's cavalry from aiding General David Hunter's force in western Virginia, where it was sure to have inflicted significant damage on General Robert E. Lee's supply and communication lines. The battle also served to screen Lt. Gen. Jubal A. Early's move from Richmond to aid Lynchburg, which Hunter was set to besiege. Hampton's cavalry corps shadowed Sheridan's return to Petersburg.

Fitzhugh Lee subsequently joined Early for his campaign against Maj. Gen. Philip Sheridan in the Shenandoah Valley, and at Third Winchester (September 19, 1864) three horses were shot under him, and he was severely wounded. When General Hampton was sent to assist General Joseph E. Johnston in North Carolina, the command of the whole of Robert E. Lee's cavalry devolved upon Fitzhugh Lee on March 29, 1865, but the surrender at Appomattox followed quickly upon the opening of the campaign. Fitzhugh Lee himself led the last charge of the Confederates on April 9 that year at Farmville, Virginia.

== Post-Civil War ==
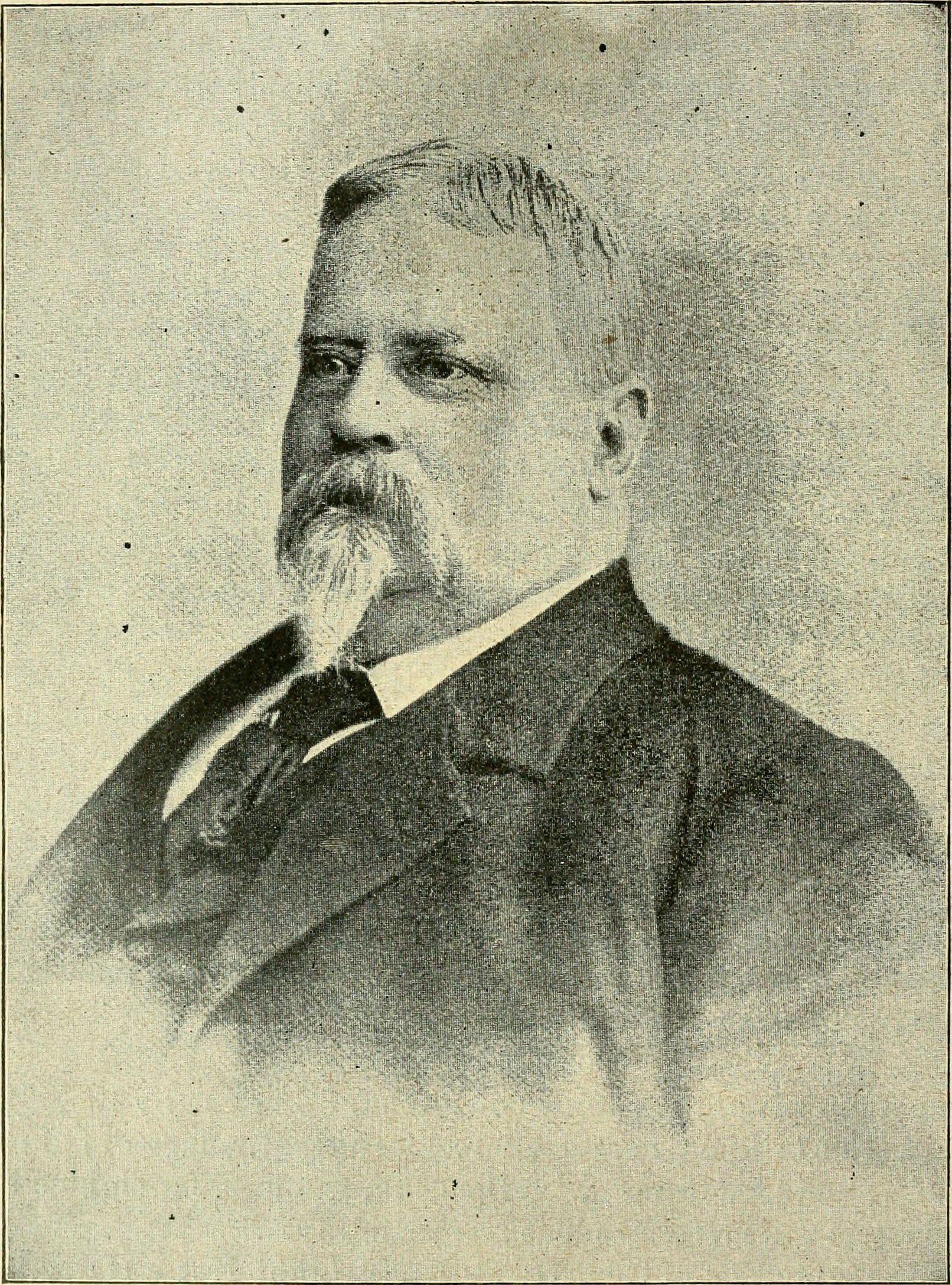
Lee in 1898

After the end of the Civil War, Fitzhugh Lee devoted himself to farming in Stafford County, Virginia, and was conspicuous in his efforts to reconcile the Southern people to the issue of the war, which he regarded as a final settlement of the questions at issue. In 1875, he attended the Battle of Bunker Hill centennial at Boston and delivered an address. In 1885, he was a member of the board of visitors of West Point, and from 1886 to 1890 was governor of Virginia having defeated in 1885 Republican John Sergeant Wise with 52.77% of the vote.

Lee commanded the third division at President Grover Cleveland's inaugural parades in 1885 and 1893.

In 1895, Cleveland appointed Lee the collector of internal revenue for the western district of Virginia.

=== Consul-general in Havana ===
In April 1896, Lee was appointed consul-general at Havana by President Cleveland, with duties of a diplomatic and military character added to the usual consular business. In this post, in which he was retained by President William McKinley until 1898, he was the first called upon to deal with a situation of great difficulty, which culminated with the destruction of the warship USS Maine. When war was declared between Spain and the United States, he re-entered the United States Army.

He was one of four ex-Confederate Army general officers who were made major generals of United States Volunteers; the others being Matthew Butler, Joseph Wheeler, and Thomas L. Rosser. Fitzhugh Lee commanded the 7th Army Corps but took no part in the actual operations in Cuba. He was military governor of Havana and Pinar del Río in 1899, subsequently commanded the Department of the Missouri, and retired in 1901 as a brigadier general, U.S. Army.

Lee was an early leader of the committee for the Jamestown Exposition, which was held after his death at Sewell's Point on Hampton Roads in 1907.

Lee wrote the article about Robert E. Lee in the Great Commanders series (1894), General Lee, a wartime biography (1894), and Cuba's Struggle Against Spain (1899).

== Death ==
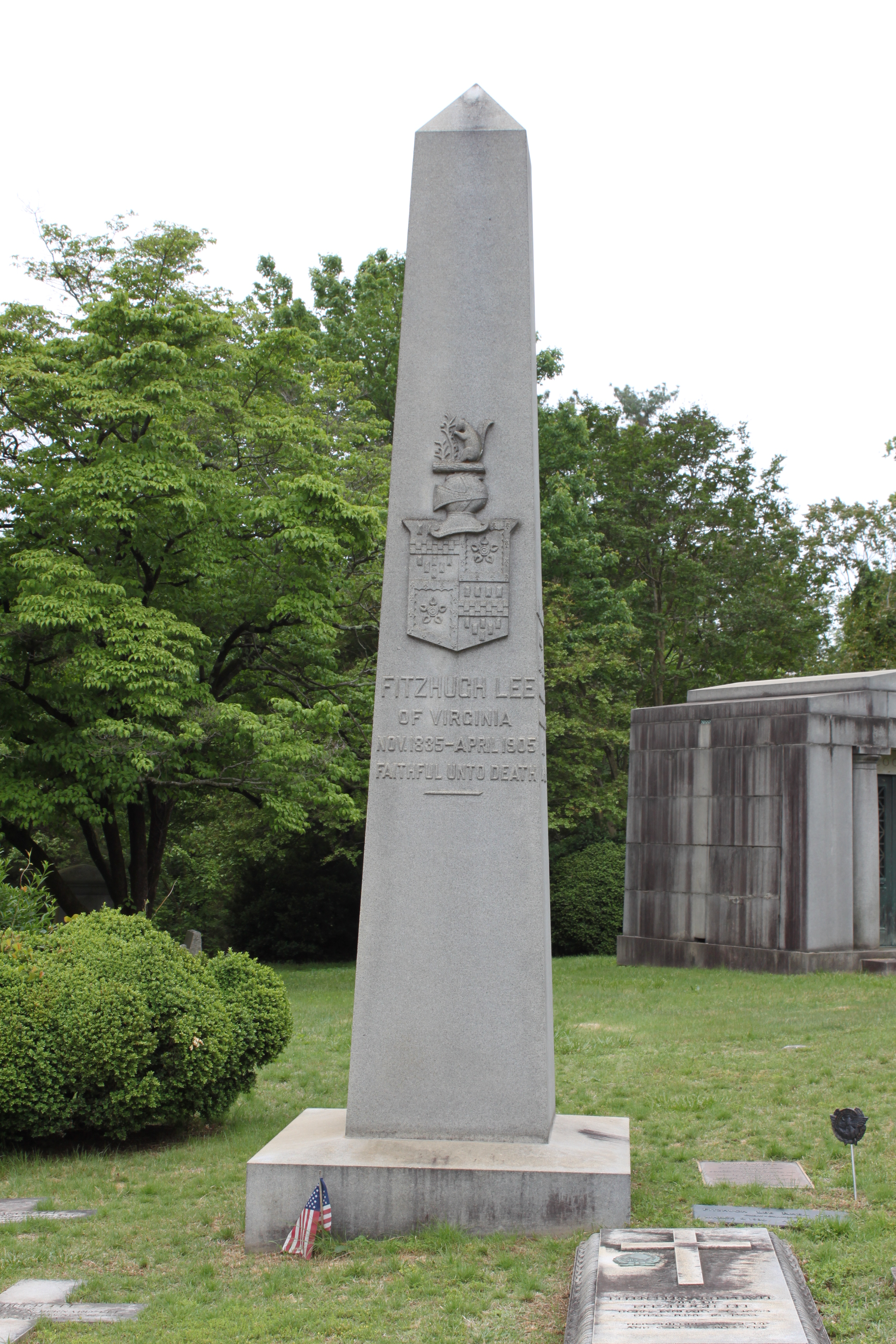
Lee's grave at Hollywood Cemetery in Richmond, Virginia

Lee died in Washington, D.C., and is buried in Hollywood Cemetery, Richmond.

== Legacy ==
He was indicted for treason for his participation in the war, but the indictment was withdrawn in February 1869. Lee then received a pardon. The Seventh Army Corps Association and Auxiliary dedicated a monument to Lee's service to the 7th Army Corps from 1898 to 1899, placing it in Monroe Park, Richmond, Virginia; the City of Richmond removed the monument on July 9, 2020, in recognition of Lee's participation in the Confederacy.

== See also ==
- List of American Civil War generals (Confederate)
- United Confederate Veterans

Party political offices
Preceded by John W. Daniel	Democratic nominee for Governor of Virginia; 1885	Succeeded by Philip W. McKinney
Political offices
Preceded by William E. Cameron	Governor of Virginia; 1886–1890	Succeeded by Philip W. McKinney
