= 1887 Maryland gubernatorial election =

- November 8, 1887
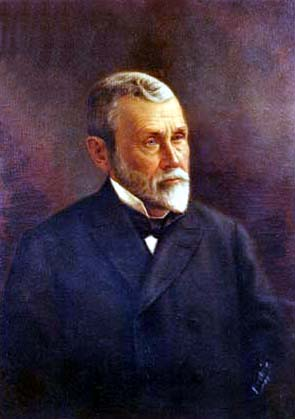

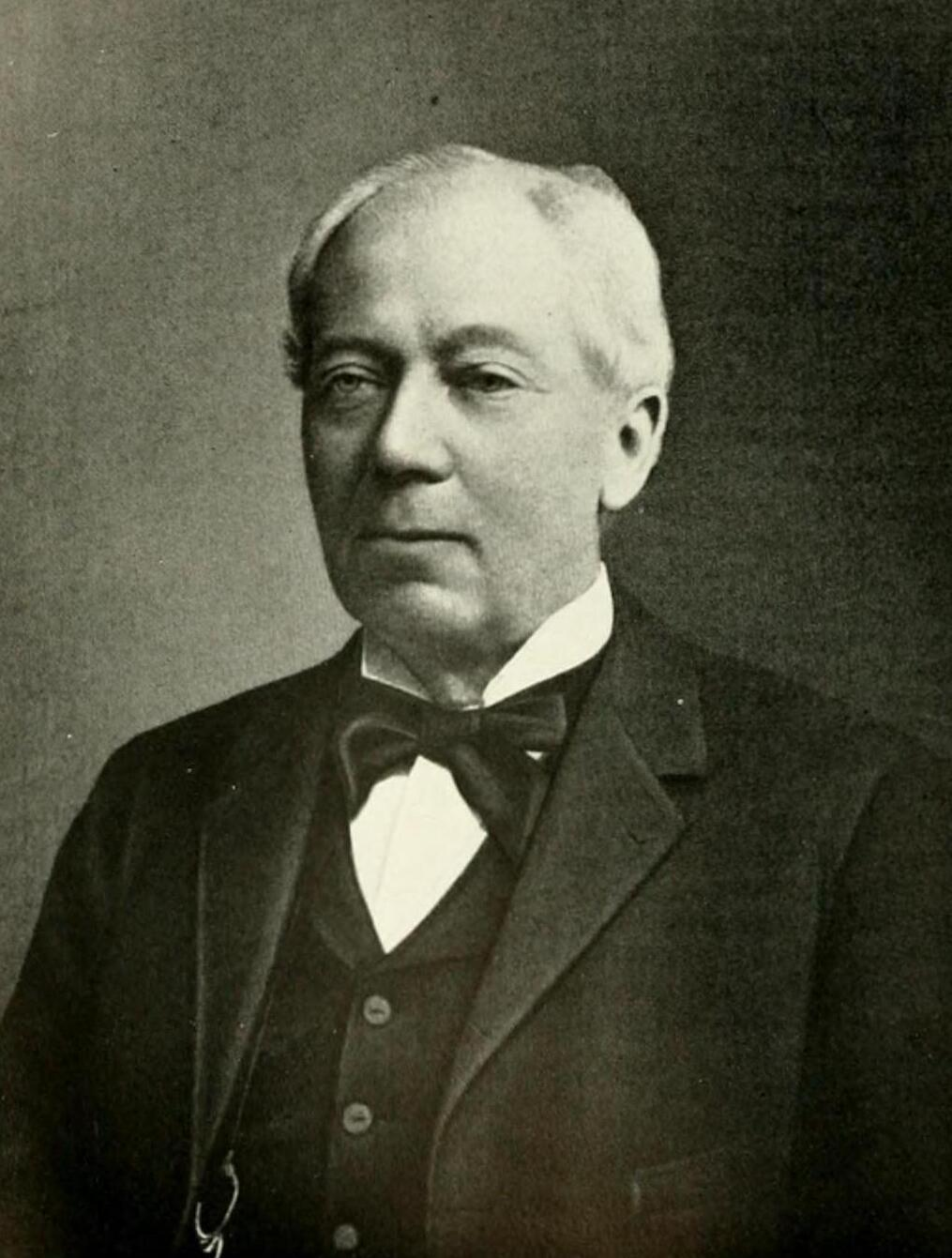
Nominee	Elihu Emory Jackson	Walter B. Brooks
Party	Democratic	Republican
Popular vote	99,038	86,622
Percentage	52.10%	45.57%
- County results Jackson: 40–50% 50–60% 60–70% Brooks: 40–50% 50–60%
Governor before election
Henry Lloyd (acting)
Democratic
Elected Governor
Elihu Emory Jackson
Democratic

The 1887 Maryland gubernatorial election took place on November 8, 1887.

Incumbent Democratic Governor Henry Lloyd did not seek re-election.

Democratic candidate Elihu Emory Jackson defeated Republican candidate Walter B. Brooks.

== General election ==
=== Candidates ===
- Elihu Emory Jackson, Democratic, former State Senator
- Walter B. Brooks, Republican, businessman
- Summerfield Baldwin, Prohibition, merchant

=== Results ===
1887 Maryland gubernatorial election
Party	Candidate	Votes	%	±%
Democratic	Elihu Emory Jackson	99,038	52.10%	
Republican	Walter B. Brooks	86,622	45.57%	
Prohibition	Summerfield Baldwin	4,416	2.32%	
Majority		12,416	6.53%	
Turnout		190,076		
Democratic hold		Swing		
