= Elihu Emory Jackson =

American politician (1837-1907)

Elihu Jackson
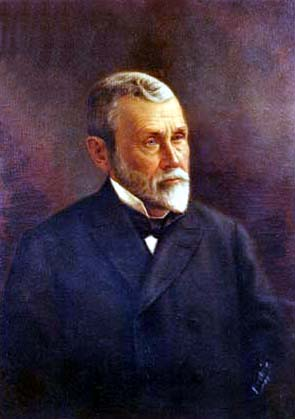

41st Governor of Maryland
- In office January 11, 1888 – January 13, 1892
- Preceded by: Henry Lloyd
- Succeeded by: Frank Brown

Maryland House of Delegates
- In office 1882–1883

Maryland State Senate
- In office 1884–1886
- In office 1895–1897

Personal details
- Born: November 3, 1837 Delmar, Maryland, U.S.
- Died: December 27, 1907 (aged 70) Baltimore, Maryland, U.S.
- Party: Democratic
- Spouse: Nannie Rider
- Children: 5

Elihu Emory Jackson (November 3, 1837 – December 27, 1907) was an American politician who served as the 41st governor of Maryland in the United States from 1888 to 1892. He was born in 1837 in Delmar, Maryland and died in 1907 in the City of Baltimore, Maryland. He is buried at the Parsons Cemetery in Salisbury, Maryland, the county seat of Wicomico County. He was part owner of Pemberton Hall, listed on the National Register of Historic Places in 1971.

Governor Jackson is also known as having attended the ceremonies at Gettysburg Battlefield in Gettysburg, Pennsylvania from the largest military battle on the North American continent in July 1863, dedicating several regimental and battle monuments for engagements participated in by the Union Army (United States Army), and even visiting some already erected and privately funded Confederate States Army monuments, and showing equanimity towards both sides with several regiments of Maryland troops in both armies, including regiments from the former pre-war State Militia. During the ceremonies and travels through the battlefield areas, he and his staff carried a revived Maryland state flag incorporating the shield from the coats-of-arms of the old colonial proprietary family of the Calverts and Crosslands, with both the black/gold chevrons of the paternal Calvert family and the red/white colors of the split bottony crosses (trefoil) of the maternal Crossland family. The ancestral parents of the first Lord Baltimore, Sir George Calvert, the first Baron Baltimore (Lord Baltimore) who originally received the granting charter in 1632 from King Charles I of England for the new third English colony and Province of Maryland, which after his sudden death, was transferred to his eldest son and heir, Cecilius Calvert (the second Baron Baltimore and Lord Baltimore), who then became the first Lord Proprietor of the Colony while still living in England. It was he who sent the first two ships (the "Ark" and the "Dove") to the shores of the Potomac River and the Chesapeake Bay with colonists who first briefly visited Virginia further south, then landed in March 1634, established the new capital St. Mary's City, under his younger brother Leonard Calvert, as the first colonial governor.

By the end of the 19th century, carrying the old colonial armorial bearings from the shield emblazoned on a newly revived state flag, now seemed symbolic of the revival of reconciliation and sense of moving forward in the state so deeply torn asunder during the recent Civil War. There are several photographs of the Governor and his staff arrayed in front of several of the Maryland military monuments at Gettysburg, dressed in military uniforms and with the new state flag prominently posted alongside.

It was officially adopted in 1904 as the state flag by act of the General Assembly of Maryland in the historic 18th-century Maryland State House in the later state capital of Annapolis.

In his 2005 biography of poet Ogden Nash, Douglas M. Parker has written that "Elihu Emory Jackson ... made a sizable fortune in the lumber business." The family, wrote Parker, were "Southern Methodists and Southern sympathizers." Jackson's granddaughter, Frances Leonard, was wed to Nash from 1931 to his death in 1971.

Party political offices
Preceded by Robert Milligan McLane	Democratic nominee for Governor of Maryland; 1887	Succeeded by Frank Brown
Political offices
Preceded by Henry Lloyd	Governor of Maryland; 1888–1892	Succeeded by Frank Brown
