= 1885 Iowa gubernatorial election =

- November 3, 1885
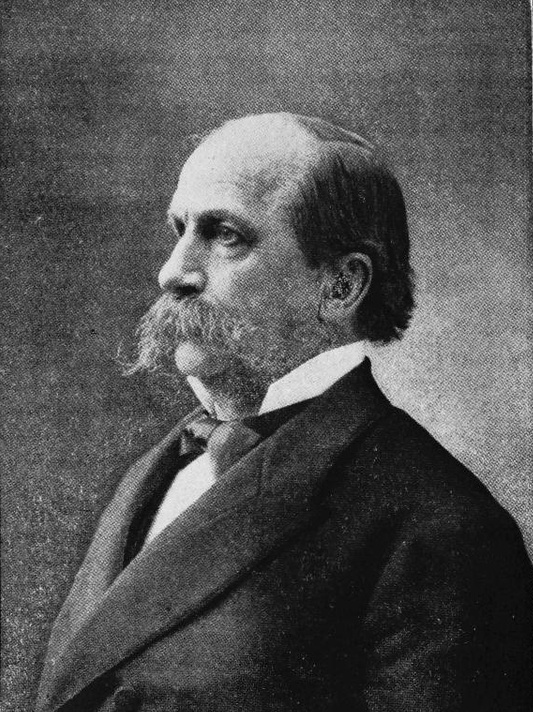

Nominee	William Larrabee	Charles E. Whiting
Party	Republican	Democratic
Popular vote	175,605	168,584
Percentage	50.76%	48.73%
- County results Larrabee: 40–50% 50–60% 60–70% 70–80% Whiting: 40–50% 50–60% 60–70%
Governor before election
Buren R. Sherman
Republican
Elected Governor
William Larrabee
Republican

The 1885 Iowa gubernatorial election was held on November 3, 1885. Republican nominee William Larrabee defeated Democratic nominee Charles E. Whiting with 50.76% of the vote.

== General election ==
=== Candidates ===
Major party candidates

- William Larrabee, Republican
- Charles E. Whiting, Democratic

Other candidates

- James Michelwait, Prohibition
- Elias Doty, Greenback

=== Results ===
1885 Iowa gubernatorial election
Party	Candidate	Votes	%	±%
Republican	William Larrabee	175,605	50.76%	
Democratic	Charles E. Whiting	168,584	48.73%	
Prohibition	James Michelwait	1,412	0.41%	
Greenback	Elias Doty	314	0.09%	
Majority		7,021		
Turnout				
Republican hold		Swing		
