= John Sergeant Wise =

American politician

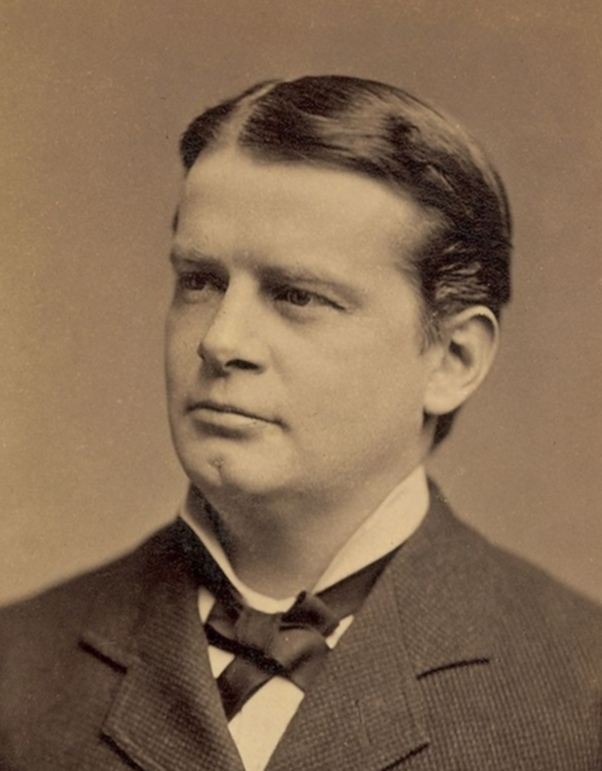

Member of the U.S. House of Representatives from Virginia's at-large district
- In office March 4, 1883 – March 3, 1885
- Preceded by: District created
- Succeeded by: District abolished (Virginia's House delegation when district re-established in 1933)

United States Attorney for the Eastern District of Virginia
- In office May 1882 – March 1883
- Appointed by: Chester A. Arthur
- Preceded by: Lunsford L. Lewis
- Succeeded by: Edmund Waddill Jr.

Personal details
- Born: December 27, 1846 Rio de Janeiro, Empire of Brazil
- Died: May 12, 1913 (aged 66) Princess Anne, Maryland, U.S.
- Party: Readjuster Party
- Education: Virginia Military Institute; University of Virginia
- Profession: lawyer, writer
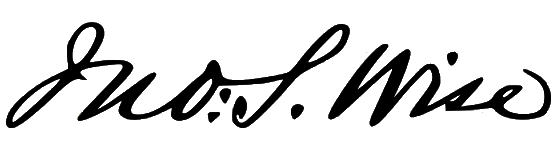
- Signature

Military service
- Allegiance: Confederate States
- Branch/service: VMI Cadets; Confederate States Army
- Years of service: 1864–1865
- Rank: First lieutenant
- Battles/wars: American Civil War: Battle of New Market

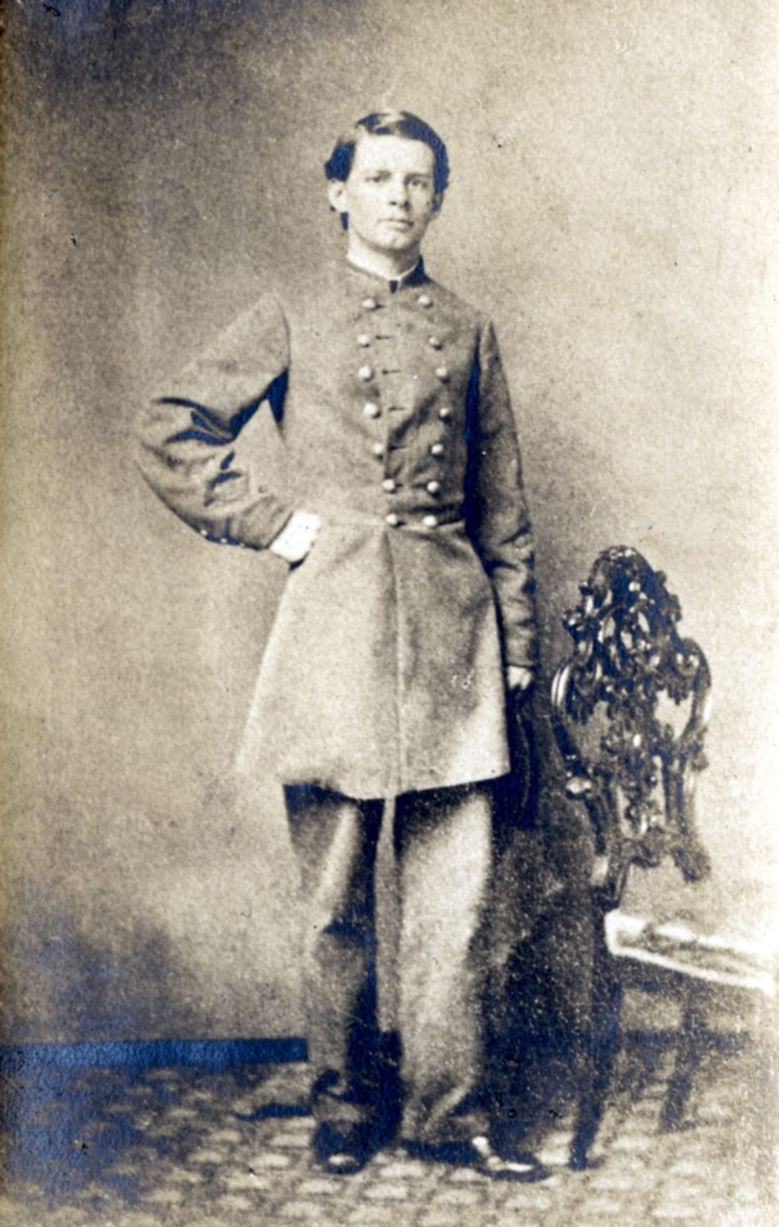
John S. Wise in military uniform

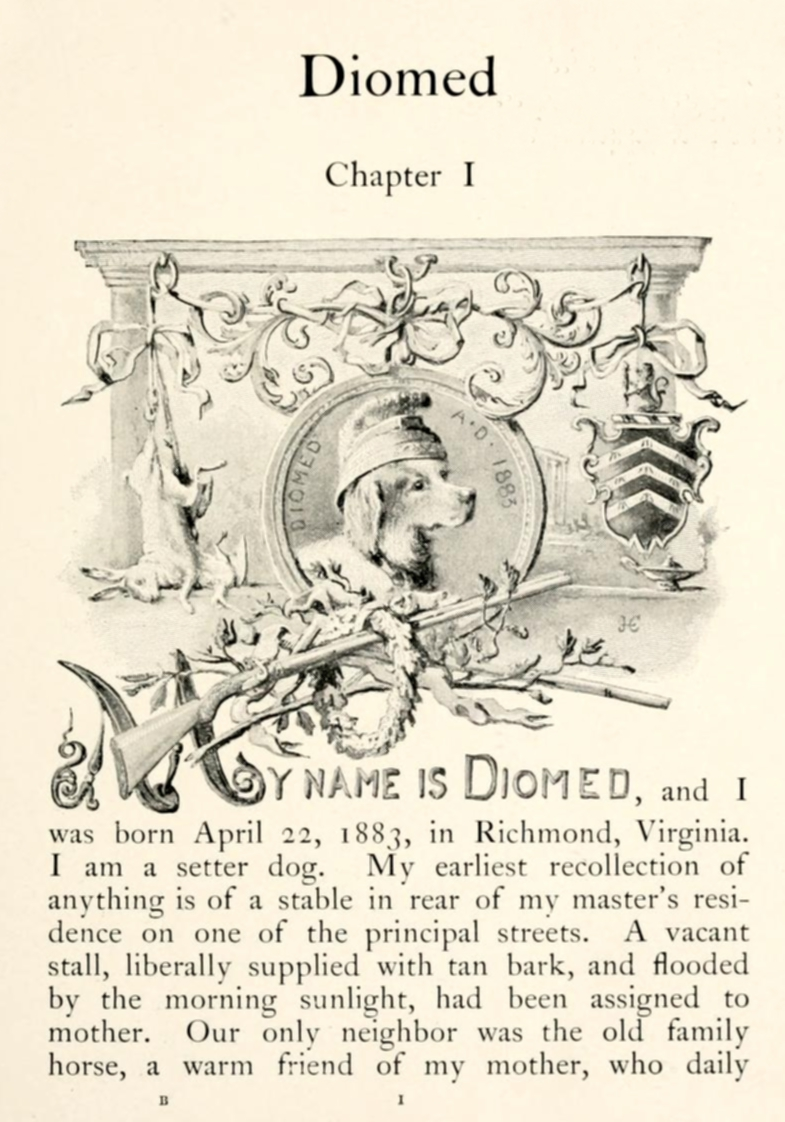
Diomed, "the greatest writer that ever was born among dogs".

John Sergeant Wise (December 27, 1846 – May 12, 1913) was an American author, lawyer, and politician in Virginia. He was the son of Henry A. Wise and Sarah Sergeant.

== Early life ==
John was born in Rio de Janeiro in 1846, while his father was U.S. Minister to the Empire of Brazil. He lived as a youth with his father and others at Rolleston, their plantation on the Elizabeth River outside Norfolk, Virginia. His father served as a US Congressman before being elected as Governor of Virginia in 1856. After being privately tutored as a youth, Wise attended Virginia Military Institute.

Still a student when the American Civil War began, Wise served with the VMI Corps of Cadets at the Battle of New Market. Ordered to guard the Cadets' baggage train, he defied those orders to stay there, and took part in the Cadets' famous charge. After the battle, Wise accepted an officer's commission in the Confederate States Army.

== Law and politics ==
After the war, Wise studied law at the University of Virginia, where he was initiated as a Brother of Beta Theta Pi fraternity in 1867. That same year he graduated and was admitted to the bar.

Wise practiced law in Richmond, Virginia for many years. In 1880, he was an unsuccessful candidate for U.S. Representative. In May 1882, he was appointed United States Attorney for the Eastern District of Virginia, serving until March 1883.

Later in 1882, Wise was elected U.S. Representative for Virginia's at-large seat as a "Readjuster" – a label used by a coalition of Republicans and dissident Virginia Democrats. He served in the 48th United States Congress, from 1883 to 1885.

Before the 1884 elections, Virginia's districts were redrawn, abolishing the at-large seat. Wise did not seek re-election from a district. Instead, in 1885 he ran for Governor of Virginia as a Republican, but lost to Democrat Fitzhugh Lee.

In November 1902, Wise was the attorney of records in two federal lawsuits--Jones v. Montague, 194 U.S. Reports 147-153 (1904) and Selden v. Montague, 194 U.S. Reports 153 (1904)--which concerning the Virginia Constitutional Convention of 1902. The former was on behalf of voters in Virginia's 3rd congressional district against Virginia's Governor Andrew Jackson Montague as well as the Secretary of the Commonwealth and the Auditor of Public Accounts, and sought a writ of prohibition against counting the November 1902 election returns and also complained that the party in power sought to disenfranchise colored voters. The convention's delegates by a 47 to 38 majority voted not to submit their work product (which disenfranchised most Black and poor white voters) to voters as promised earlier, but instead proclaimed it as in effect as of July 10, 1902. The federal courts ruled they had no jurisdiction and relied upon a South Carolina constitutional convention case, "Mills v. Green", 159 U.S. 651 (1895). U.S. Supreme Court Justice Brewer took judicial notice that the U.S. House of Representatives had seated the congressmen elected by Virginia voters that year and "the thing sought to be prohibited has been done and cannot be undone by order of court", so the U.S. Supreme Court declined to get involved. By the 1904 election, fifty percent fewer white, and ninety percent fewer black men voted.

== Last years ==
Wise later moved to New York City, and practiced law there until his retirement. He died in 1913, near Princess Anne, Maryland.

== Literary career ==
John Wise wrote several books, most notably a memoir entitled The End of an Era (1899), which has been reprinted in numerous editions since its first publication. A full text edition is available online at the University of North Carolina's website, Documenting the American South. It describes his boyhood in the last days before the Civil War, while he was living on his father's plantation "Rolleston" in Virginia, with a childhood slave companion and friend. He also discusses the war years, his father's role in the war, and his family.

=== Principal literary works ===
- Diomed: The Life, Travels, and Observations of a Dog (1897)
- The End of an Era (1899)
- The Lion's Skin: a Historical Novel and a Novel History (1905)
- Recollections of Thirteen Presidents (1906)

== Family ==
On November 3, 1869, he married Evelyn Byrd Beverly Douglas, daughter of Hugh Douglas and Nancy Hamilton. John and Evelyn had nine children, seven sons and two daughters:

1. John Sergeant Wise (died young)
2. Hugh Douglas Wise
3. Henry Alexander Wise
4. John Sergeant Wise (as was custom, he was given the same name as an older brother who died young, in order to carry on his father's name)
5. Hamilton Wise
6. Eva Douglas Wise
7. Jennings Cropper Wise (recipient of the Distinguished Service Cross during the First World War, he became Commandant of Virginia Military Institute)
8. Margaretta Watnough Wise
9. Byrd Douglas Wise

New York State Senator Henry A. Wise (1906–1982) was his grandson.

== In popular culture ==
Wise was portrayed by Luke Benward in the 2014 film Field of Lost Shoes, which depicted the Battle of New Market.

Party political offices
Vacant Title last held by Robert William Hughes	Republican nominee for Governor of Virginia; 1885	Succeeded by William Mahone
U.S. House of Representatives
Preceded by District established	Member of the U.S. House of Representatives from Virginia's at-large congressional district 1883–1885	Succeeded by District abolished
