= 1885 Rhode Island gubernatorial election =

- April 1, 1885
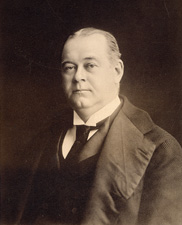

Nominee	George P. Wetmore	Ziba O. Slocum	George H. Slade
Party	Republican	Democratic	Prohibition
Popular vote	12,563	8,674	1,206
Percentage	55.97%	38.64%	5.37%
- Wetmore: 40–50% 50–60% 60–70% 70–80% 80-90% Slocum: 40–50% 50–60% 60–70%
Governor before election
Augustus O. Bourn
Republican
Elected Governor
George P. Wetmore
Republican

The 1885 Rhode Island gubernatorial election was held on April 1, 1885. Republican nominee George P. Wetmore defeated Democratic nominee Ziba O. Slocum with 55.97% of the vote.

== General election ==
=== Candidates ===
Major party candidates

- George P. Wetmore, Republican
- Ziba O. Slocum, Democratic

Other candidates

- George H. Slade, Prohibition

=== Results ===
1885 Rhode Island gubernatorial election
Party	Candidate	Votes	%	±%
Republican	George P. Wetmore	12,563	55.97%	
Democratic	Ziba O. Slocum	8,674	38.64%	
Prohibition	George H. Slade	1,206	5.37%	
Majority		3,889		
Turnout				
Republican hold		Swing		
