= 1885 Virginia gubernatorial election =

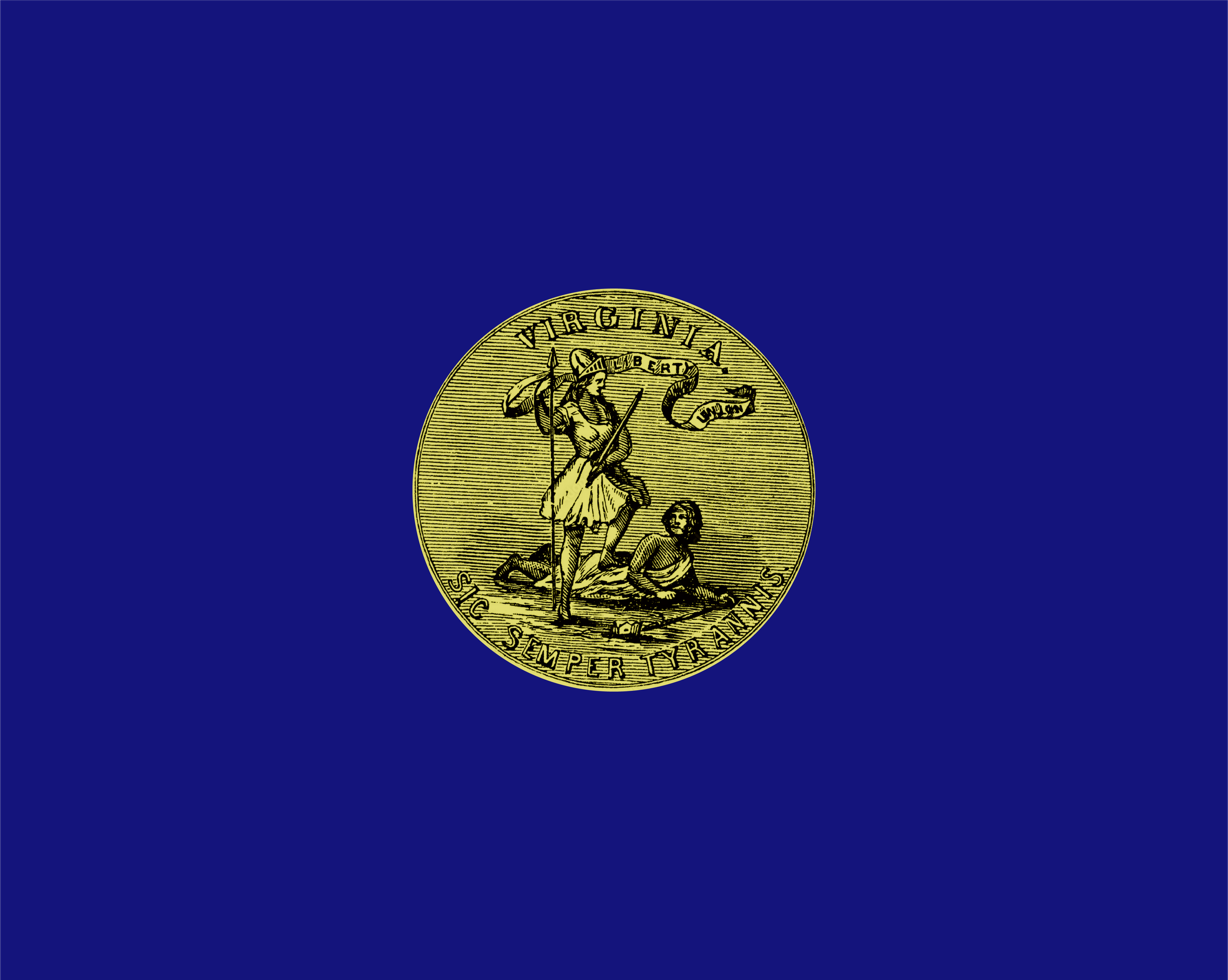
- November 3, 1885
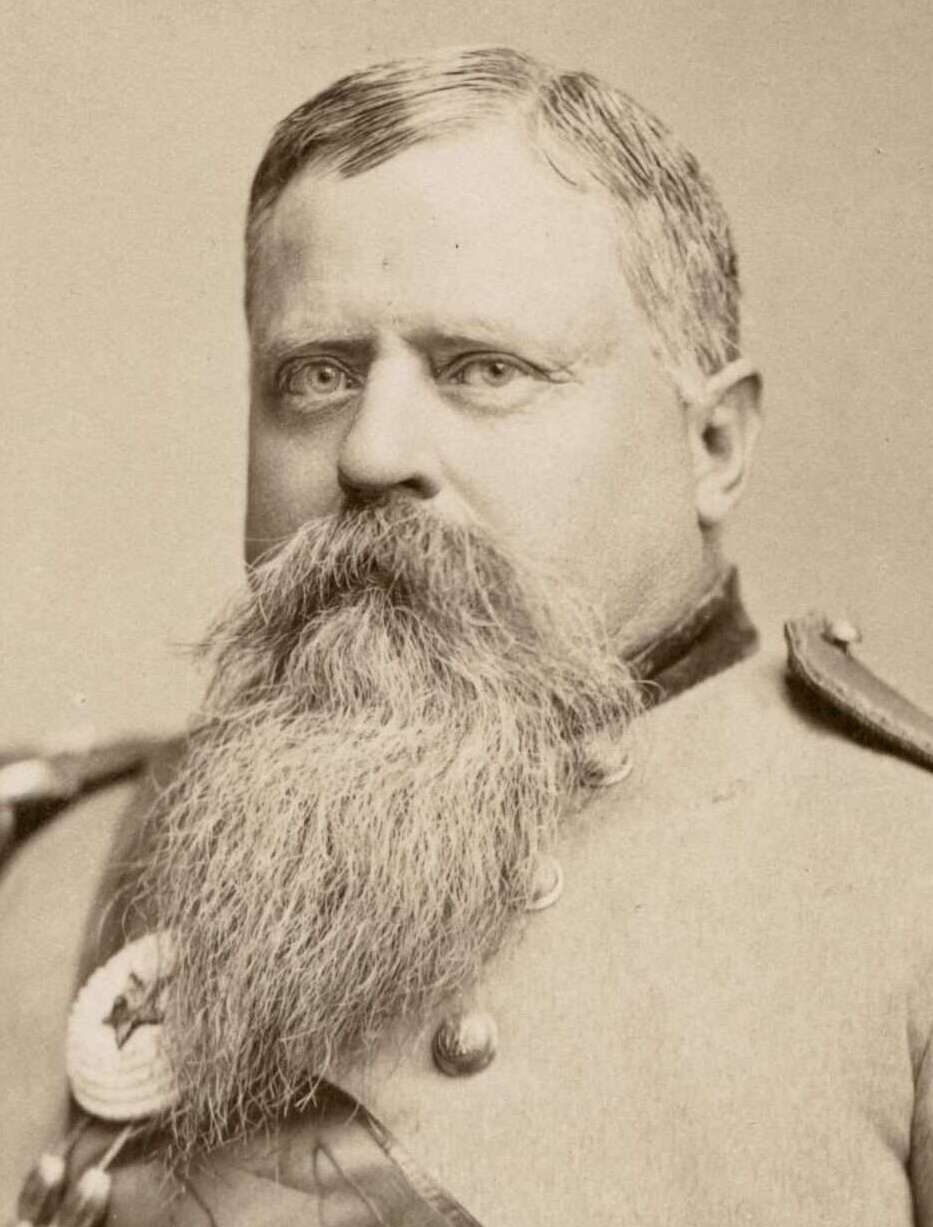

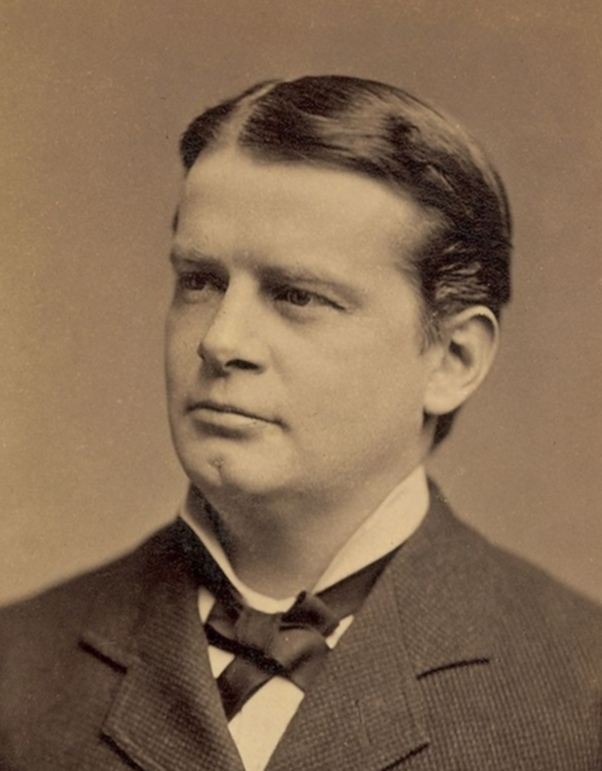
Nominee	Fitzhugh Lee	John Sergeant Wise
Party	Democratic	Republican
Popular vote	152,547	136,508
Percentage	52.77%	47.22%
- County results Lee: 50–60% 60–70% 70–80% 80–90% Wise: 50–60% 60–70% 70–80%
Governor before election
William E. Cameron
Readjuster
Elected Governor
Fitzhugh Lee
Democratic

The 1885 Virginia gubernatorial election was held on November 3, 1885, to elect the governor of Virginia.

== Results ==
Virginia gubernatorial election, 1885
Party	Candidate	Votes	%
Democratic	Fitzhugh Lee	152,547	52.77%
Republican	John Sergeant Wise	136,508	47.22%
Write-ins		17	0.01%
Total votes		289,072	100.00%
Democratic gain from Readjuster			
