= 1887 Iowa gubernatorial election =

- November 8, 1887
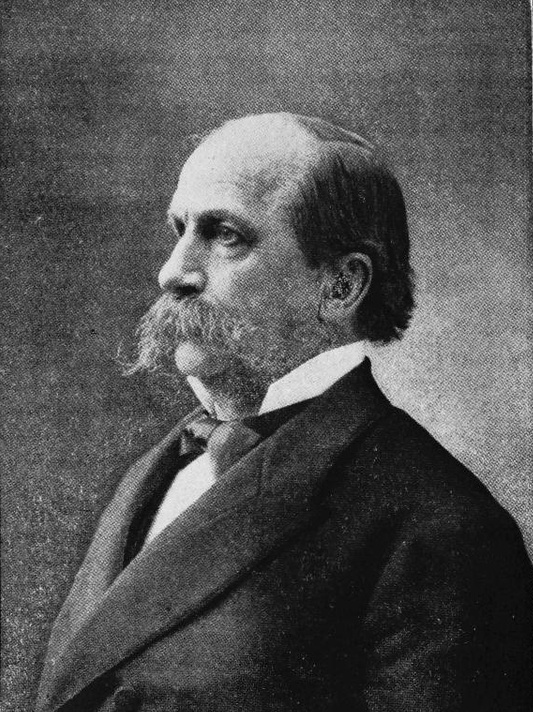

Nominee	William Larrabee	Thomas J. Anderson
Party	Republican	Democratic
Popular vote	169,596	153,706
Percentage	50.18%	45.47%
- County results Larrabee: 40–50% 50–60% 60–70% 70–80% 80–90% Anderson: 40–50% 50–60% 60–70% 70–80%
Governor before election
William Larrabee
Republican
Elected Governor
William Larrabee
Republican

The 1887 Iowa gubernatorial election was held on Tuesday November 8, 1887. Incumbent Republican William Larrabee defeated Democratic nominee Thomas J. Anderson with 50.18% of the vote.

== General election ==
=== Candidates ===
Major party candidates

- William Larrabee, Republican
- Thomas J. Anderson, Democratic

Other candidates

- M. J. Cain, Union Labor
- V. G. Farnham, Prohibition

=== Results ===
1887 Iowa gubernatorial election
Party	Candidate	Votes	%	±%
Republican	William Larrabee (incumbent)	169,596	50.18%	
Democratic	Thomas J. Anderson	153,706	45.47%	
Labor	M. J. Cain	14,283	4.23%	
Prohibition	V. G. Farnham	334	0.10%	
Majority		15,890		
Turnout				
Republican hold		Swing		
