= Henry Lloyd (governor) =

American politician (1852-1920)

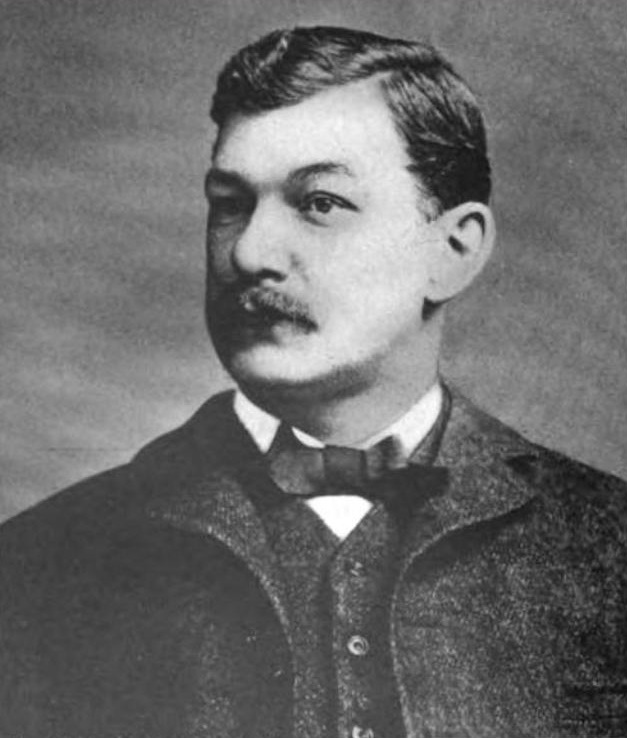
- Lloyd from 1908's "Governors of Maryland: From the Revolution to the Year 1908", by Heinrich Ewald Buchholz

40th Governor of Maryland
- In office March 27, 1885 - January 11, 1888
- Preceded by: Robert Milligan McLane
- Succeeded by: Elihu Emory Jackson

Maryland State Senate
- In office 1882–1885

Personal details
- Born: February 21, 1852 Dorchester County, Maryland, U.S.
- Died: December 30, 1920 (aged 68) Cambridge, Maryland, U.S.
- Resting place: Christ Church Episcopal Cemetery
- Party: Democratic
- Spouse: Mary Elizabeth Stapelfort (m. 1886)
- Children: 1
- Relatives: Daniel Maynadier Henry (uncle); Edward Lloyd; Edward Lloyd V John Henry

Henry Lloyd (February 21, 1852 – December 30, 1920) was an American politician who served as the 40th governor of Maryland from 1885 to 1888. He was born in 1852 in Dorchester County, Maryland and died in 1920 in Cambridge, Maryland. He was a grandson of Maryland Governor Edward Lloyd.

== Early life ==
Henry Lloyd was born in Dorchester County, Maryland on February 21, 1852, the son of Daniel Lloyd and Kitty Henry Lloyd. He was descended from Edward Lloyd, who had served as Colonial Governor in 1709, and from Edward Lloyd V, the Governor in 1809. He was a descendant on his mother's side of John Henry, the first United States Senator from the Eastern Shore and Governor between 1797 and 1798. He graduated from Cambridge Academy in 1871, then began his career by teaching school. He began the study of law in the office of his uncles Daniel Maynadier Henry, then Congressman from the Eastern Shore, and Judge Charles P. Goldsborough. He was admitted to the bar in 1873.

== Personal life ==
On October 18, 1886, he married Mary Elizabeth Staplefort, and they had one son.

== Career ==
In 1881, he was elected a member of the Maryland State Senate from Dorchester County, being elected its President in the Legislative Session of 1884. He then became the acting governor on March 27, 1885, when Robert M. McLane resigned to become Minister to France. He continued as such until January 1886, when the Legislature votes 100 of 114 ballots for him to be Governor. He was inaugurated on January 21, 1886, to serve until January 11, 1888.

Following his term as governor, Lloyd resumed his law practice in Cambridge, Maryland. He was then elected for the full 15-year term as an Associate Judge of the First Judicial Circuit in 1893.

== Death ==
Lloyd died at his home in Cambridge on December 30, 1920. He is buried at the Christ Church Episcopal Cemetery in Cambridge.

Political offices
Preceded by George Hawkins Williams	President of the Maryland State Senate; 1884	Succeeded by Edwin Warfield
Preceded by Robert Milligan McLane	Governor of Maryland; 1885–1888	Succeeded by Elihu Emory Jackson
