= 1885 Mississippi gubernatorial election =

- November 3, 1885
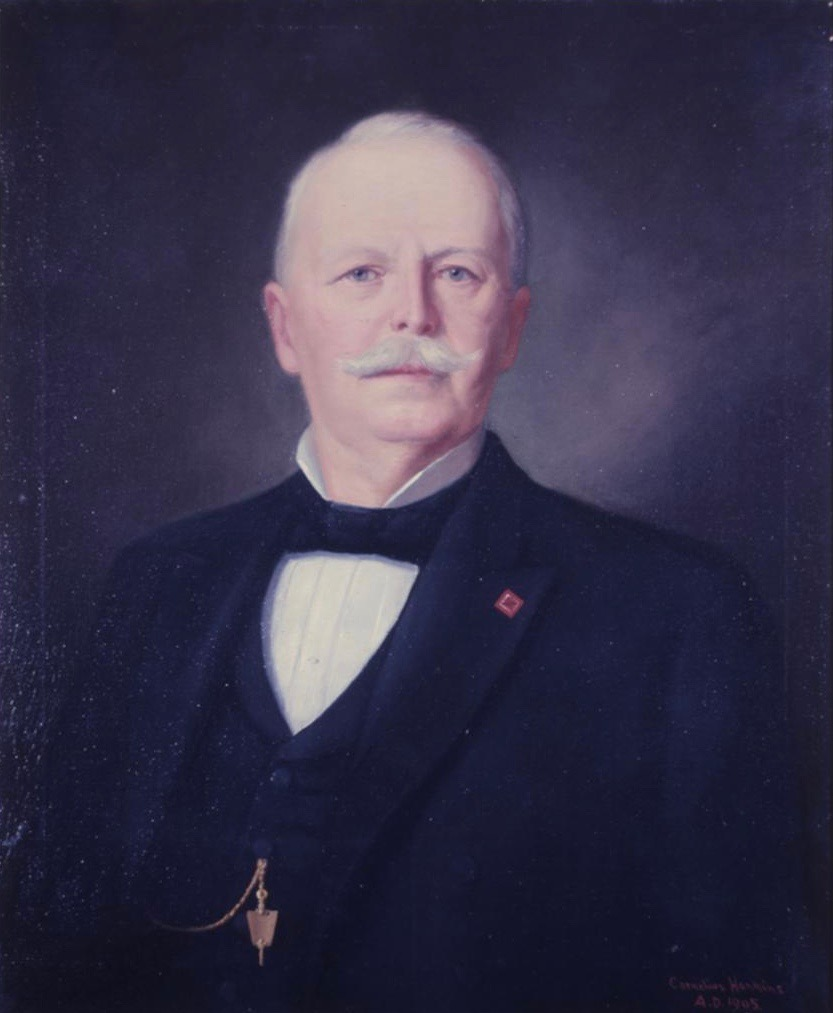
| Nominee | Robert Lowry |
| Party | Democratic |
| Popular vote | 88,783 |
| Percentage | 99.01% |
- County results Lowry: >90% Darden: 50–60%
Governor before election
Robert Lowry
Democratic
Elected Governor
Robert Lowry
Democratic

The 1885 Mississippi gubernatorial election took place on November 3, 1885, in order to elect the Governor of Mississippi. Incumbent Governor Robert Lowry ran for reelection to a second term.

== General election ==
In the general election, Democratic candidate Robert Lowry, the incumbent governor, defeated independent candidate Put Darden in a landslide.

=== Results ===
Mississippi gubernatorial election, 1885
| Party | Candidate | Votes | % |
|---|---|---|---|
| Democratic | Robert Lowry (incumbent) | 88,783 | 99.01 |
| Independent | Put Darden | 824 | 0.92 |
| Other | | 64 | 0.07 |
| Total votes | | 89,671 | 100.00 |
| Democratic hold | | | |
