= 1887 Ohio gubernatorial election =

- November 1, 1887
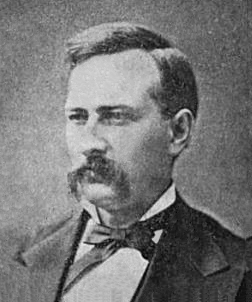

Nominee	Joseph B. Foraker	Thomas E. Powell
Party	Republican	Democratic
Popular vote	356,534	333,205
Percentage	47.73%	44.61%
- County results Foraker: 40–50% 50–60% 60–70% 70–80% Powell: 40–50% 50–60% 60–70%
Governor before election
Joseph B. Foraker
Republican
Elected Governor
Joseph B. Foraker
Republican

The 1887 Ohio gubernatorial election was held on November 1, 1887. Incumbent Republican Joseph B. Foraker defeated Democratic nominee Thomas E. Powell with 47.73% of the vote.

== General election ==
=== Candidates ===
Major party candidates

- Joseph B. Foraker, Republican
- Thomas E. Powell, Democratic

Other candidates

- Morris Sharp, Prohibition
- John J. Seitz, People's

=== Results ===
1887 Ohio gubernatorial election
Party	Candidate	Votes	%	±%
Republican	Joseph B. Foraker (incumbent)	356,534	47.73%	
Democratic	Thomas E. Powell	333,205	44.61%	
Prohibition	Morris Sharp	29,700	3.98%	
Populist	John J. Seitz	24,711	3.31%	
Majority		23,329		
Turnout				
Republican hold		Swing		
