= List of elections in 1952 =

The following elections occurred in the year 1952.

- 1952 Chilean presidential election
- 1952 Dahomeyan Territorial Assembly election
- 1952 Gabonese legislative election
- 1952 Japanese general election
- 1952 Mexican general election
- 1952 Panamanian general election
- 1952 Salvadoran legislative election
- 1952 Ubangi-Shari parliamentary election
- 1952 Venezuelan Constituent Assembly election

== Asia ==
- 1952 Afghan parliamentary election
- 1951–52 Burmese general election
- 1952 Ceylonese parliamentary election
- 1952 Iranian legislative election
- 1952 Israeli presidential election
- 1952 Lebanese presidential election
- 1952 Malayan local elections
- 1952 South Korean local elections
- 1952 South Korean presidential election
- 1952 Thai general election

=== India ===
- 1952 Indian presidential election
- 1952 Indian vice presidential election
- 1951–52 elections in India

==== Legislative Assembly elections ====
- 1952 Hyderabad Legislative Assembly election
- 1952 Madras Legislative Assembly election
- 1952 West Bengal Legislative Assembly election

== Australia ==
- 1952 Ashfield state by-election
- 1952 Bradfield by-election
- 1952 Flinders by-election
- 1952 Liverpool state by-election
- 1952 Lyne by-election
- 1952 Port Melbourne state by-election
- 1952 Victorian state election
- 1952 Werriwa by-election

== Europe ==
- 1952 Dutch general election
- 1952 Greek parliamentary election
- 1952 Icelandic presidential election
- 1952 Irish presidential election
- 1952 Polish legislative election
- 1952 Romanian legislative election
- 1952 Swedish general election
- 1952 Swiss referendums

=== United Kingdom ===
- 1952 Belfast South by-election
- 1952 Birmingham Small Heath by-election
- 1952 Bournemouth East and Christchurch by-election
- 1952 Cleveland by-election
- 1952 Dundee East by-election
- 1952 Farnworth by-election
- 1952 Leeds South East by-election
- 1952 North Antrim by-election
- 1952 Southport by-election
- 1952 Wycombe by-election

== North America ==
=== Canada ===
- 1952 Alberta general election
- 1952 British Columbia general election
- 1952 Edmonton municipal election
- 1952 New Brunswick general election
- 1952 Ottawa municipal election
- 1952 Quebec general election
- 1952 Saskatchewan general election
- 1952 Toronto municipal election
- 1952 Yukon general election

=== Caribbean ===
- 1952 Dominican Republic general election
- 1952 Montserratian general election
- 1952 Puerto Rican general election

=== Mexico ===
- 1952 Mexican general election

=== United States ===
- 1952 United States elections
- 1952 United States presidential election

==== United States lieutenant gubernatorial ====
- 1952 Delaware lieutenant gubernatorial election
- 1952 Illinois lieutenant gubernatorial election
- 1952 Louisiana lieutenant gubernatorial election
- 1952 Minnesota lieutenant gubernatorial election
- 1952 Missouri lieutenant gubernatorial election
- 1952 Nebraska lieutenant gubernatorial election
- 1952 North Carolina lieutenant gubernatorial election
- 1952 Virginia lieutenant gubernatorial special election
- 1952 Wisconsin lieutenant gubernatorial election

==== United States gubernatorial ====
- 1952 Arizona gubernatorial election
- 1952 Arkansas gubernatorial election
- 1952 Colorado gubernatorial election
- 1952 Delaware gubernatorial election
- 1952 Florida gubernatorial election
- 1952 Illinois gubernatorial election
- 1952 Indiana gubernatorial election
- 1952 Iowa gubernatorial election
- 1952 Kansas gubernatorial election
- 1952 Louisiana gubernatorial election
- 1952 Maine gubernatorial election
- 1952 Massachusetts gubernatorial election
- 1952 Michigan gubernatorial election
- 1952 Minnesota gubernatorial election
- 1952 Missouri gubernatorial election
- 1952 Montana gubernatorial election
- 1952 Nebraska gubernatorial election
- 1952 New Hampshire gubernatorial election
- 1952 New Mexico gubernatorial election
- 1952 North Carolina gubernatorial election
- 1952 North Dakota gubernatorial election
- 1952 Ohio gubernatorial election
- 1952 Rhode Island gubernatorial election
- 1952 South Dakota gubernatorial election
- 1952 Tennessee gubernatorial election
- 1952 Texas gubernatorial election
- 1952 United States gubernatorial elections
- 1952 Utah gubernatorial election
- 1952 Vermont gubernatorial election
- 1952 Washington gubernatorial election
- 1952 West Virginia gubernatorial election
- 1952 Wisconsin gubernatorial election

==== United States House of Representatives ====
- 1952 United States House of Representatives elections

==== United States Senate ====
- 1952 United States Senate elections
- 1952 United States Senate election in Arizona
- 1952 United States Senate election in California
- 1952 United States Senate election in Connecticut
- 1952 United States Senate special election in Connecticut
- 1952 United States Senate election in Delaware
- 1952 United States Senate election in Florida
- 1952 United States Senate election in Indiana
- 1952 United States Senate special election in Kentucky
- 1952 United States Senate election in Maine
- 1952 United States Senate election in Maryland
- 1952 United States Senate election in Massachusetts
- 1952 United States Senate election in Michigan
- 1952 United States Senate election in Minnesota
- 1952 United States Senate election in Mississippi
- 1952 United States Senate election in Missouri
- 1952 United States Senate election in Montana
- 1952 United States Senate election in Nebraska
- 1952 United States Senate special election in Nebraska
- 1952 United States Senate election in Nevada
- 1952 United States Senate election in New Jersey
- 1952 United States Senate election in New York
- 1952 United States Senate election in North Dakota
- 1952 United States Senate election in Ohio
- 1952 United States Senate election in Pennsylvania
- 1952 United States Senate election in Rhode Island
- 1952 United States Senate election in Tennessee
- 1952 United States Senate election in Texas
- 1952 United States Senate election in Vermont
- 1952 United States Senate election in Virginia
- 1952 United States Senate election in Washington
- 1952 United States Senate election in Wisconsin
- 1952 United States Senate election in Wyoming

== Oceania ==
=== Australia ===
- 1952 Ashfield state by-election
- 1952 Bradfield by-election
- 1952 Flinders by-election
- 1952 Liverpool state by-election
- 1952 Lyne by-election
- 1952 Port Melbourne state by-election
- 1952 Victorian state election
- 1952 Werriwa by-election

== South America ==
=== Falkland Islands ===
- 1952 Falkland Islands general election
