= Electoral results for the Division of Lyne =

Australian division election results

This is a list of electoral results for the Division of Lyne in Australian federal elections from the electorate's creation in 1949 until the present.

== Members ==
Member	Party	Term
Jim Eggins	Country	1949–1952
Philip Lucock	Country, National	1952–1980
Bruce Cowan	National	1980–1993
Mark Vaile	National	1993–2008
Rob Oakeshott	Independent	2008–2013
David Gillespie	National	2013–2025
Alison Penfold	National	2025–present

== Election results ==
=== Elections in the 2020s ===
==== 2025 ====
2025 Australian federal election: Lyne
Party	Candidate	Votes	%	±%
National	Alison Penfold	21,604	35.69	−7.65
Labor	Digby Wilson	12,002	19.83	−2.02
Independent	Jeremy Miller	8,989	14.85	+14.85
One Nation	Colin Hughes	5,169	8.54	+0.05
Greens	Tom Ferrier	4,111	6.79	−1.42
Legalise Cannabis	Keys Manley	3,504	5.79	+5.79
Libertarian	Mark Hornshaw	2,370	3.92	+3.92
Trumpet of Patriots	Cathy Charsley	1,531	2.53	+2.53
Family First	David Masters	1,003	1.66	+1.66
Citizens	Stephen Burke	253	0.42	+0.42
Total formal votes		60,536	91.70	−1.09
Informal votes		5,477	8.30	+1.09
Turnout		66,013	50.91	

Results are not final. Last updated on 3 May 2025 at 11:00 PM AEST.

==== 2022 ====
2022 Australian federal election: Lyne
Party	Candidate	Votes	%	±%
National	David Gillespie	46,661	43.51	−5.84
Labor	Alex Simpson	23,024	21.47	−2.62
One Nation	Josephine Cashman	8,502	7.93	+7.93
Greens	Karl Attenborough	8,422	7.85	+1.34
Liberal Democrats	Mark Hornshaw	6,824	6.36	+0.56
Independent	Steve Attkins	5,574	5.20	+5.20
United Australia	Joel Putland	4,421	4.12	+0.07
Independent	Joanne Pearce	3,820	3.56	+3.56
Total formal votes		107,248	93.41	+2.48
Informal votes		7,563	6.59	−2.48
Turnout		114,811	92.22	−1.51
Two-party-preferred result
National	David Gillespie	68,421	63.80	−1.37
Labor	Alex Simpson	38,827	36.20	+1.37
National hold		Swing	−1.37	

Alluvial diagram for preference flows in the seat of Lyne in the 2022 federal election. indicates at what stage the winning candidate had over 50% of the votes and was declared the winner.

=== Elections in the 2010s ===
==== 2019 ====
2019 Australian federal election: Lyne
Party	Candidate	Votes	%	±%
National	David Gillespie	49,934	49.35	−0.22
Labor	Phil Costa	24,371	24.09	−2.47
Greens	Stuart Watson	6,589	6.51	−2.93
Liberal Democrats	Dean McCrae	5,864	5.80	+5.80
Independent	Jeremy Miller	5,169	5.11	+5.11
United Australia	Garry Bourke	4,098	4.05	+4.05
Conservative National	Ryan Goldspring	1,986	1.96	+1.96
Australian Workers	Ed Caruana	1,676	1.66	+1.66
Christian Democrats	Catherine Zhao	1,493	1.48	−1.56
Total formal votes		101,180	90.93	−4.48
Informal votes		10,096	9.07	+4.48
Turnout		111,276	93.73	+0.29
Two-party-preferred result
National	David Gillespie	65,942	65.17	+3.54
Labor	Phil Costa	35,238	34.83	−3.54
National hold		Swing	+3.54	

==== 2016 ====
2016 Australian federal election: Lyne
Party	Candidate	Votes	%	±%
National	David Gillespie	49,399	49.57	+19.40
Labor	Peter Alley	26,470	26.56	+2.59
Greens	Julie Lyford	9,406	9.44	+3.10
Independent	Brad Christensen	9,227	9.26	+9.26
Christian Democrats	Elaine Carter	3,026	3.04	+0.83
Independent	Rodger John Riach	2,126	2.13	+2.13
Total formal votes		99,654	95.41	+1.11
Informal votes		4,797	4.59	−1.11
Turnout		104,451	93.44	−1.17
Two-party-preferred result
National	David Gillespie	61,416	61.63	−1.89
Labor	Peter Alley	38,238	38.37	+1.89
National hold		Swing	−1.89	

==== 2013 ====
2013 Australian federal election: Lyne
Party	Candidate	Votes	%	±%
National	David Gillespie	45,871	53.19	+18.80
Labor	Peter Alley	18,352	21.28	+7.79
Independent	Steve Attkins	6,561	7.61	+7.61
Greens	Ian Oxenford	5,340	6.19	+1.90
Palmer United	Troy Wilkie	4,727	5.48	+5.48
One Nation	Craig Huth	2,208	2.56	+2.56
Christian Democrats	John Klose	2,054	2.38	+2.38
Katter's Australian	Brian Buckley Clare	814	0.94	+0.94
Citizens Electoral Council	Michael Gough	318	0.37	+0.37
Total formal votes		86,245	93.69	−2.58
Informal votes		5,809	6.31	+2.58
Turnout		92,054	94.78	−0.60
Two-party-preferred result
National	David Gillespie	55,857	64.77	+2.32
Labor	Peter Alley	30,388	35.23	−2.32
National gain from Independent		Swing	+2.32	

The sitting member was Rob Oakeshott (Independent) who did not contest the election.

==== 2010 ====
2010 Australian federal election: Lyne
Party	Candidate	Votes	%	±%
Independent	Rob Oakeshott	40,061	47.15	+47.15
National	David Gillespie	29,216	34.39	−15.74
Labor	Frederik Lips	11,459	13.49	−18.49
Greens	Ian Oxenford	3,645	4.29	−2.75
Independent	Barry Wright	586	0.69	−0.50
Total formal votes		84,967	96.27	+1.30
Informal votes		3,294	3.73	−1.30
Turnout		88,261	95.35	−0.24
Notional two-party-preferred count
National	David Gillespie	53,065	62.45	+3.65
Labor	Frederik Lips	31,902	37.55	−3.65
Two-candidate-preferred result
Independent	Rob Oakeshott	53,297	62.73	
National	David Gillespie	31,670	37.27	−21.53
Independent gain from National		Swing	N/A	

Mark Vaile (National) had won Lyne at the 2007 election, however he resigned in 2008 and Rob Oakeshott (Independent) won the seat at the resulting by-election.

=== Elections in the 2000s ===
==== 2008 by-election ====
2008 Lyne by-election
Party	Candidate	Votes	%	±%
Independent	Rob Oakeshott	47,306	63.80	+63.80
National	Rob Drew	16,964	22.88	−29.38
Greens	Susie Russell	5,206	7.02	−0.13
Fishing Party	Bob Smith	2,566	3.46	+3.46
Democratic Labor	Michael O'Donohue	853	1.15	+1.15
Independent	Barry Wright	582	0.78	−0.46
Independent	Stewart Scott-Irving	400	0.54	+0.12
Citizens Electoral Council	Graeme Muldoon	270	0.36	+0.13
Total formal votes		74,147	96.55	+1.62
Informal votes		2,646	3.45	−1.62
Turnout		76,793	87.31	−8.62
Two-candidate-preferred result
Independent	Rob Oakeshott	54,770	73.87	+73.87
National	Rob Drew	19,377	26.13	−32.45
Independent gain from National		Swing	N/A	

Mark Vaile (National) resigned.

==== 2007 ====
2007 Australian federal election: Lyne
Party	Candidate	Votes	%	±%
National	Mark Vaile	41,319	52.26	−4.44
Labor	James Langley	25,358	32.07	+5.52
Greens	Susie Russell	5,649	7.15	+2.37
Independent	Jamie Harrison	3,326	4.21	+4.21
Christian Democrats	Robert Waldron	1,679	2.12	+2.12
Independent	Barry Wright	979	1.24	+1.24
Independent	Stewart Scott-Irving	330	0.42	+0.42
Independent	Rodger Riach	238	0.30	+0.30
Citizens Electoral Council	Graeme Muldoon	184	0.23	−0.02
Total formal votes		79,062	94.93	+0.23
Informal votes		4,220	5.07	−0.23
Turnout		83.282	95.96	+0.55
Two-party-preferred result
National	Mark Vaile	46,311	58.58	−4.83
Labor	James Langley	32,751	41.42	+4.83
National hold		Swing	−4.83	

==== 2004 ====
2004 Australian federal election: Lyne
Party	Candidate	Votes	%	±%
National	Mark Vaile	46,958	56.31	+3.01
Labor	Greg Watters	22,325	26.77	−2.45
Greens	Jeremy Bradley	3,966	4.76	+1.79
One Nation	Joan Stanfield	3,046	3.65	−6.56
New Country	Robyn Murphy	2,824	3.39	+3.39
Democrats	Peter Wildblood	1,401	1.68	−1.11
Independent	Kerry Salt	1,327	1.59	+1.59
Family First	Simon Apostle	1,181	1.42	+1.42
Citizens Electoral Council	Graeme Muldoon	225	0.27	−0.04
Socialist Alliance	Ron Bailey	141	0.17	+0.17
Total formal votes		83,394	94.51	−1.49
Informal votes		4,749	5.39	+1.49
Turnout		88,143	95.62	−0.30
Two-party-preferred result
National	Mark Vaile	52,564	63.03	+1.79
Labor	Greg Watters	30,830	36.97	−1.79
National hold		Swing	+1.79	

==== 2001 ====
2001 Australian federal election: Lyne
Party	Candidate	Votes	%	±%
National	Mark Vaile	42,699	53.30	+3.61
Labor	Pat Stevens	23,405	29.22	−0.01
One Nation	Lynn Stanfield	8,178	10.21	−2.97
Greens	Siobhan Isherwood	2,380	2.97	+0.75
Democrats	Philip Jirman	2,237	2.79	+0.08
Independent	Dane William Sara	963	1.20	+1.20
Citizens Electoral Council	Graeme Muldoon	248	0.31	+0.07
Total formal votes		80,109	96.10	−0.27
Informal votes		3,247	3.90	+0.27
Turnout		83,356	96.78	
Two-party-preferred result
National	Mark Vaile	49,057	61.24	+1.11
Labor	Pat Stevens	31,052	38.76	−1.11
National hold		Swing	+1.11	

=== Elections in the 1990s ===
==== 1998 ====
1998 Australian federal election: Lyne
Party	Candidate	Votes	%	±%
National	Mark Vaile	38,812	51.00	−7.85
Labor	Vicki Grieves	22,456	29.51	+0.50
One Nation	Ray Danton	9,011	11.84	+11.84
Democrats	Allan Quartly	1,974	2.59	−1.92
Greens	Carrie Jacobi	1,501	1.97	−1.34
Christian Democrats	Barry Watts	1,166	1.53	+1.53
Independent	Terrence Simms	984	1.29	+1.29
Citizens Electoral Council	Graeme Muldoon	197	0.26	+0.26
Total formal votes		76,101	96.27	−1.22
Informal votes		2,947	3.73	+1.22
Turnout		79,048	96.15	−0.67
Two-party-preferred result
National	Mark Vaile	45,451	59.72	−5.71
Labor	Vicki Grieves	30,650	40.28	+5.71
National hold		Swing	−5.71	

==== 1996 ====
1996 Australian federal election: Lyne
Party	Candidate	Votes	%	±%
National	Mark Vaile	44,056	58.85	+32.16
Labor	John Weate	21,717	29.01	−11.62
Democrats	Rodger Riach	3,379	4.51	+1.73
Against Further Immigration	Marje Roswell	3,237	4.32	+4.32
Greens	Susie Russell	2,478	3.31	+3.31
Total formal votes		74,867	97.49	−0.44
Informal votes		1,927	2.51	+0.44
Turnout		76,794	96.82	+0.33
Two-party-preferred result
National	Mark Vaile	48,801	65.44	+11.20
Labor	John Weate	25,776	34.56	−11.20
National hold		Swing	+11.20	

==== 1993 ====
1993 Australian federal election: Lyne
Party	Candidate	Votes	%	±%
Labor	Dennis Driver	28,424	40.63	+9.77
National	Mark Vaile	18,670	26.69	−25.53
Liberal	John Barrett	18,668	26.68	+26.68
Independent EFF	Marje Roswell	2,247	3.21	+3.21
Democrats	John Stokes	1,949	2.79	−10.40
Total formal votes		69,958	97.93	+0.15
Informal votes		1,478	2.07	−0.15
Turnout		71,436	96.50	
Two-party-preferred result
National	Mark Vaile	37,918	54.24	−5.21
Labor	Dennis Driver	31,993	45.76	+5.21
National hold		Swing	−5.21	

==== 1990 ====
1990 Australian federal election: Lyne
Party	Candidate	Votes	%	±%
National	Bruce Cowan	38,963	51.2	−3.8
Labor	Garry Worth	25,414	33.4	−3.2
Democrats	Peter Cooper	11,758	15.4	+7.0
Total formal votes		76,135	97.6	
Informal votes		1,863	2.4	
Turnout		77,998	96.5	
Two-party-preferred result
National	Bruce Cowan	43,570	57.3	−2.5
Labor	Dennis Driver	32,435	42.7	+2.5
National hold		Swing	−2.5	

=== Elections in the 1980s ===
==== 1987 ====
1987 Australian federal election: Lyne
Party	Candidate	Votes	%	±%
National	Bruce Cowan	36,467	55.0	+1.8
Labor	Garry Worth	24,252	36.6	−3.1
Democrats	John Aitken	5,534	8.4	+2.7
Total formal votes		66,253	96.9	
Informal votes		2,135	3.1	
Turnout		68,688	96.6	
Two-party-preferred result
National	Bruce Cowan	39,629	59.8	+4.4
Labor	Garry Worth	26,619	40.2	−4.4
National hold		Swing	+4.4	

==== 1984 ====
1984 Australian federal election: Lyne
Party	Candidate	Votes	%	±%
National	Bruce Cowan	31,801	53.2	+0.3
Labor	Fred May	23,707	39.7	+2.1
Democrats	Roland Inman	3,401	5.7	+0.7
Independent	Stewart Cooper	863	1.4	+1.4
Total formal votes		59,772	95.4	
Informal votes		2,857	4.6	
Turnout		62,629	95.4	
Two-party-preferred result
National	Bruce Cowan	33,955	56.8	−2.4
Labor	Fred May	25,814	43.2	+2.4
National hold		Swing	−2.4	

==== 1983 ====
1983 Australian federal election: Lyne
Party	Candidate	Votes	%	±%
National	Bruce Cowan	40,140	50.4	+18.6
Labor	Francis Murray	31,877	40.1	+2.4
Democrats	Stephen Jeffries	3,953	5.0	+2.6
Independent	John Bryant	2,800	3.5	+3.5
Independent	Alfred Cannings	514	0.6	+0.6
Progress	John Veenstra	284	0.4	+0.4
Total formal votes		79,568	98.3	
Informal votes		1,343	1.7	
Turnout		80,911	95.9	
Two-party-preferred result
National	Bruce Cowan		55.3	−3.6
Labor	Francis Murray		44.7	+3.6
National hold		Swing	−3.6	

==== 1980 ====
1980 Australian federal election: Lyne
Party	Candidate	Votes	%	±%
Labor	Leslie Brown	27,714	37.7	+3.7
National Country	Bruce Cowan	23,413	31.8	−24.0
Liberal	Milton Morris	20,636	28.1	+28.1
Democrats	Edwin Poppleton	1,792	2.4	−7.8
Total formal votes		73,555	98.6	
Informal votes		1,021	1.4	
Turnout		74,576	96.1	
Two-party-preferred result
National Country	Bruce Cowan	43,350	58.9	−2.5
Labor	Leslie Brown	30,205	41.1	+2.5
National Country hold		Swing	−2.5	

=== Elections in the 1970s ===
==== 1977 ====
1977 Australian federal election: Lyne
Party	Candidate	Votes	%	±%
National Country	Philip Lucock	36,678	55.8	−3.3
Labor	Noel Unicomb	22,308	34.0	+2.1
Democrats	Allen Edwards	6,687	10.2	+10.2
Total formal votes		65,673	98.6	
Informal votes		916	1.4	
Turnout		66,589	97.1	
Two-party-preferred result
National Country	Philip Lucock		61.4	−2.2
Labor	Noel Unicomb		38.6	+2.2
National Country hold		Swing	−2.2	

==== 1975 ====
1975 Australian federal election: Lyne
Party	Candidate	Votes	%	±%
National Country	Philip Lucock	35,554	60.0	+0.2
Labor	Bruce Langford	18,377	31.0	−5.5
Independent	Peter Simpson	5,362	9.0	+9.0
Total formal votes		59,293	98.8	
Informal votes		720	1.2	
Turnout		60,013	97.1	
Two-party-preferred result
National Country	Philip Lucock		64.5	+2.7
Labor	Bruce Langford		35.5	−2.7
National Country hold		Swing	+2.7	

==== 1974 ====
1974 Australian federal election: Lyne
Party	Candidate	Votes	%	±%
Country	Philip Lucock	33,253	59.8	+8.8
Labor	Ken Reed	20,306	36.5	−6.2
Australia	David Haig	2,005	3.6	+1.1
Total formal votes		55,564	98.8	
Informal votes		655	1.2	
Turnout		56,219	96.7	
Two-party-preferred result
Country	Philip Lucock		61.8	+6.9
Labor	Ken Reed		38.2	−6.9
Country hold		Swing	+6.9	

==== 1972 ====
1972 Australian federal election: Lyne
Party	Candidate	Votes	%	±%
Country	Philip Lucock	24,633	51.0	−7.8
Labor	Peter Carney	20,619	42.7	+7.2
Democratic Labor	Jack Collins	1,550	3.2	+3.2
Australia	Stephanie Thew	1,204	2.5	−1.0
Independent	Joe Cordner	286	0.6	−1.6
Total formal votes		48,292	98.7	
Informal votes		659	1.3	
Turnout		58,591	96.4	
Two-party-preferred result
Country	Philip Lucock		54.9	−6.4
Labor	Peter Carney		45.1	+6.4
Country hold		Swing	−6.4	

=== Elections in the 1960s ===
==== 1969 ====
1969 Australian federal election: Lyne
Party	Candidate	Votes	%	±%
Country	Philip Lucock	25,898	58.8	−6.9
Labor	John Allan	15,631	35.5	+5.5
Australia	Percival McPherson	1,561	3.5	+3.5
Independent	Joe Cordner	973	2.2	+0.1
Total formal votes		44,063	98.5	
Informal votes		664	1.5	
Turnout		44,727	95.3	
Two-party-preferred result
Country	Philip Lucock		61.3	−6.6
Labor	John Allan		38.7	+6.6
Country hold		Swing	−6.6	

==== 1966 ====
1966 Australian federal election: Lyne
Party	Candidate	Votes	%	±%
Country	Philip Lucock	27,822	64.4	+2.9
Labor	John Allan	13,537	31.3	−4.4
Independent	William Power	933	2.2	+2.2
Independent	Joe Cordner	923	2.1	−0.7
Total formal votes		43,215	97.6	
Informal votes		1,065	2.4	
Turnout		44,280	96.0	
Two-party-preferred result
Country	Philip Lucock		66.6	+3.7
Labor	John Allan		33.4	−3.7
Country hold		Swing	+3.7	

==== 1963 ====
1963 Australian federal election: Lyne
Party	Candidate	Votes	%	±%
Country	Philip Lucock	25,869	61.5	+7.1
Labor	John Allan	15,039	35.7	−3.5
Independent	Joe Cordner	1,181	2.8	+0.8
Total formal votes		42,089	99.1	
Informal votes		393	0.9	
Turnout		42,482	96.0	
Two-party-preferred result
Country	Philip Lucock		62.9	+3.9
Labor	John Allan		37.1	−3.9
Country hold		Swing	+3.9	

==== 1961 ====
1961 Australian federal election: Lyne
Party	Candidate	Votes	%	±%
Country	Philip Lucock	22,599	54.4	+1.0
Labor	John Allan	16,295	39.2	+6.9
Democratic Labor	Jack Collins	1,971	4.7	+1.4
Independent	Joe Cordner	671	1.6	+0.2
Total formal votes		41,536	98.3	
Informal votes		711	1.7	
Turnout		42,247	96.5	
Two-party-preferred result
Country	Philip Lucock		59.0	−2.5
Labor	John Allan		41.0	+2.5
Country hold		Swing	−2.5	

=== Elections in the 1950s ===
==== 1958 ====
1958 Australian federal election: Lyne
Party	Candidate	Votes	%	±%
Country	Philip Lucock	21,548	53.4	−6.4
Labor	John Allan	13,028	32.3	−3.9
Independent	Murray Hooke	3,921	9.7	+9.7
Democratic Labor	William Gleeson	1,322	3.3	+3.3
Independent	Joe Cordner	561	1.4	−2.6
Total formal votes		40,380	97.6	
Informal votes		986	2.4	
Turnout		41,366	96.4	
Two-party-preferred result
Country	Philip Lucock		61.5	−0.3
Labor	John Allan		38.5	+0.3
Country hold		Swing	−0.3	

==== 1955 ====
1955 Australian federal election: Lyne
Party	Candidate	Votes	%	±%
Country	Philip Lucock	23,477	59.8	+7.7
Labor	Jack Collins	14,198	36.2	+36.2
Independent	Joe Cordner	1,555	4.0	−1.1
Total formal votes		39,230	98.1	
Informal votes		777	1.9	
Turnout		40,007	96.2	
Two-party-preferred result
Country	Philip Lucock		61.8	+7.5
Labor	Jack Collins		38.2	+38.2
Country hold		Swing	+7.5	

==== 1954 ====
1954 Australian federal election: Lyne
Party	Candidate	Votes	%	±%
Country	Philip Lucock	21,388	53.5	−12.0
Independent	Donald Lancaster	16,518	41.3	+41.3
Independent	Joe Cordner	2,051	5.1	+3.0
Total formal votes		39,957	98.7	
Informal votes		514	1.3	
Turnout		40,471	97.0	
Two-party-preferred result
Country	Philip Lucock		55.6	−13.2
Independent	Donald Lancaster		44.4	+44.4
Country hold		Swing	−13.2	

==== 1952 by-election ====
1952 Lyne by-election
Party	Candidate	Votes	%	±%
Labor	Edward Hayes	13,588	37.3	+7.4
Country	Philip Lucock	10,994	30.2	−3.1
Country	Donald Lancaster	10,631	29.2	−3.1
Independent Liberal	Edward Spensley	775	2.1	+2.1
Independent	Joe Cordner	421	1.2	−3.4
Total formal votes		36,409	98.5	
Informal votes		565	1.5	
Turnout		36,974	92.1	
Two-party-preferred result
Country	Philip Lucock	21,484	59.0	−9.8
Labor	Edward Hayes	14,925	41.0	+9.8
Country hold		Swing	−9.8	

Jim Eggins (Country) died.

==== 1951 ====
1951 Australian federal election: Lyne
Party	Candidate	Votes	%	±%
Country	Jim Eggins	24,971	65.5	−4.0
Labor	Edward Hayes	11,381	29.9	+2.3
Independent	Joe Cordner	1,745	4.6	+1.7
Total formal votes		38,097	98.4	
Informal votes		615	1.6	
Turnout		38,712	97.0	
Two-party-preferred result
Country	Jim Eggins		68.8	+2.8
Labor	Edward Hayes		31.2	−2.8
Country hold		Swing	+2.8	

=== Elections in the 1940s ===
==== 1949 ====
1949 Australian federal election: Lyne
Party	Candidate	Votes	%	±%
Country	Jim Eggins	10,212	27.7	+9.3
Labor	Edward Hayes	10,160	27.6	−8.8
Country	Philip Lucock	6,984	19.0	+19.0
Country	Eric Mackay	6,111	16.6	+16.6
Country	Francis Hain	2,296	6.2	+6.2
Independent	Joe Cordner	1,057	2.9	+2.9
Total formal votes		36,820	96.8	
Informal votes		1,235	3.2	
Turnout		38,055	97.0	
Two-party-preferred result
Country	Jim Eggins	24,308	66.0	+4.1
Labor	Edward Hayes	12,512	34.0	−4.1
Country notional hold		Swing	+4.1	
