= 1952 United States gubernatorial elections =

- November 4, 1952; September 8, 1952 (ME)

30 governorships
	Majority party	Minority party
Party	Republican	Democratic
Seats before	25	23
Seats after	30	18
Seat change	▲5	▼5
Seats up	15	15
Seats won	20	10
- Democratic hold Republican hold Republican gain No election

United States gubernatorial elections were held in 1952, in 30 states, concurrent with the House, Senate elections and the presidential election, on November 4, 1952. Elections took place on September 8 in Maine. This was the last 2-year gubernatorial election Tennessee held, as they would switch from 2-year to 4-year terms in 1954.

== Race summary ==
State	Governor	Party	First elected	Status	Candidates
Arizona	J. Howard Pyle	Republican	1950	Incumbent re-elected.	▌ ✓ J. Howard Pyle (Republican) 60.2%; ▌ Joe C. Haldiman (Democratic) 39.8%
Arkansas	Sid McMath	Democratic	1948	Incumbent lost renomination. Democratic hold.	▌ ✓ Francis Cherry (Democratic) 87.4%; ▌ Jefferson W. Speck (Republican) 12.6%
Colorado	Daniel I. J. Thornton	Republican	1950	Incumbent re-elected.	▌ ✓ Daniel I. J. Thornton (Republican) 57.1%; ▌ John W. Metzger (Democratic) 42.4%; ▌ Louis K. Stephens (Socialist Labor) 0.5%
Delaware	Elbert N. Carvel	Democratic	1948	Incumbent lost re-election. Republican gain.	▌ ✓ J. Caleb Boggs (Republican) 52.1%; ▌Elbert N. Carvel (Democratic) 47.9%
Florida	Fuller Warren	Democratic	1948	Incumbent term-limited. Democratic hold.	▌ ✓ Daniel T. McCarty (Democratic) 74.8%; ▌ Harry S. Swan (Republican) 25.2%
Illinois	Adlai Stevenson II	Democratic	1948	Incumbent retired after winning primary. Republican gain.	▌ ✓ William Stratton (Republican) 52.5%; ▌ Sherwood Dixon (Democratic) 47.3%; ▌ Louis Fisher (Socialist Labor) 0.2%
Indiana	Henry F. Schricker	Democratic	1948	Incumbent term-limited. Republican gain.	▌ ✓ George N. Craig (Republican) 55.7%; ▌ John A. Watkins (Democratic) 43.6%; ▌ Lester N. Abel (Prohibition) 0.65%; ▌ Samuel Boorda (Progressive) 0.05%; ▌ Charles Ginsberg (Socialist Labor) 0.04%
Iowa	William S. Beardsley	Republican	1948	Incumbent re-elected.	▌ ✓ William S. Beardsley (Republican) 51.9%; ▌ Herschel C. Loveless (Democratic) 47.8%; ▌Z. Everett Kellum (Prohibition) 0.23%; ▌ Ernest J. Seemann (Republican Vigilantes) 0.1%
Kansas	Edward F. Arn	Republican	1950	Incumbent re-elected.	▌ ✓ Edward F. Arn (Republican) 56.3%; ▌ Charles Rooney (Democratic) 41.7%; ▌ David C. White (Prohibition) 1.8%; ▌ W.W. Tamplin (Socialist) 0.22%
Maine	Frederick G. Payne	Republican	1948	Incumbent retired. Republican hold.	▌ ✓ Burton M. Cross (Republican) 51.7%; ▌ James C. Oliver (Democratic) 33.2%; ▌ Neil S. Bishop (Ind. Rep.) 14.4%; ▌ Henry W. Boyker (Independent) 0.66%
Massachusetts	Paul A. Dever	Democratic	1948	Incumbent lost re-election. Republican gain.	▌ ✓ Christian Herter (Republican) 49.91%; ▌ Paul A. Dever (Democratic) 49.29%; ▌ Florence H. Luscomb (Peace Progressive) 0.32%; ▌Larence Gilfedder (Socialist Labor) 0.26%; ▌Guy S. Williams (Prohibition) 0.22%
Michigan	G. Mennen Williams	Democratic	1948	Incumbent re-elected.	▌ ✓ G. Mennen Williams (Democratic) 49.96%; ▌ Frederick M. Alger Jr. (Republican) 49.66%; ▌E. Harold Munn (Prohibition) 0.31%; ▌Theos A. Grove (Socialist Labor) 0.04%; ▌Howard Lerner (Socialist Workers) 0.02%
Minnesota	C. Elmer Anderson	Republican	1951 (Note: Anderson became governor in 1951 when predecessor (Luther Youngdahl) resigned.)	Incumbent re-elected.	▌ ✓ C. Elmer Anderson (Republican) 55.3%; ▌ Orville Freeman (DFL) 44.0%; ▌ Martin Frederickson (Progressive) 0.4%; ▌ Eldrid H. Bauers (Socialist Labor) 0.3%
Missouri	Forrest Smith	Democratic	1948	Incumbent term-limited. Democratic hold.	▌ ✓ Phil M. Donnelly (Democratic) 52.6%; ▌ Howard Elliott (Republican) 47.4%; ▌ Howard Edsell (Progressive) 0.05%; ▌ Maurice R. Wheeler (Socialist) 0.02%; ▌ Don Lohbeck (Christian Nationalist) 0.01%; ▌ Clara Hayes (Socialist Labor) 0.01%
Montana	John W. Bonner	Democratic	1948	Incumbent lost re-election. Republican gain.	▌ ✓ J. Hugo Aronson (Republican) 51.0%; ▌ John W. Bonner (Democratic) 49.0%
Nebraska	Val Peterson	Republican	1946	Incumbent retired. Republican hold.	▌ ✓ Robert B. Crosby (Republican) 61.4%; ▌ Walter R. Raecke (Democratic) 38.6%
New Hampshire	Sherman Adams	Republican	1948	Incumbent retired. Republican hold.	▌ ✓ Hugh Gregg (Republican) 63.2%; ▌ William H. Craig (Democratic) 36.9%
New Mexico	Edwin L. Mechem	Republican	1950	Incumbent re-elected.	▌ ✓ Edwin L. Mechem (Republican) 53.8%; ▌ Everett Grantham (Democratic) 46.2%
North Carolina	W. Kerr Scott	Democratic	1948	Incumbent term-limited. Democratic hold.	▌ ✓ William B. Umstead (Democratic) 67.5%; ▌ Herbert F. Seawell Jr. (Republican) 32.5%
North Dakota	Norman Brunsdale	Republican	1950	Incumbent re-elected.	▌ ✓ Norman Brunsdale (Republican) 78.7%; ▌ Ole C. Johnson (Democratic) 21.3%
Ohio	Frank Lausche	Democratic	1944; 1946 (lost); 1948	Incumbent re-elected.	▌ ✓ Frank Lausche (Democratic) 55.9%; ▌ Charles Phelps Taft II (Republican) 44.1%
Rhode Island	Dennis J. Roberts	Democratic	1950	Incumbent re-elected.	▌ ✓ Dennis J. Roberts (Democratic) 52.6%; ▌ Raoul Archambault Jr. (Republican) 47.4%
South Dakota	Sigurd Anderson	Republican	1950	Incumbent re-elected.	▌ ✓ Sigurd Anderson (Republican) 70.2%; ▌ Sherman A. Iverson (Democratic) 29.9%
Tennessee	Gordon Browning	Democratic	1948	Incumbent lost renomination. Democratic hold.	▌ ✓ Frank G. Clement (Democratic) 79.4%; ▌ R. Beecher Witt (Republican) 20.6%
Texas	Allan Shivers	Democratic	1949 (Note: Shivers became governor in 1949 when predecessor (Beauford H. Jester) died.)	Incumbent re-elected.	▌ ✓ Allan Shivers (Democratic) 98.05%
Utah	J. Bracken Lee	Republican	1948	Incumbent re-elected.	▌ ✓ J. Bracken Lee (Republican) 55.1%; ▌ Earl J. Glade (Democratic) 44.9%
Vermont	Lee E. Emerson	Republican	1950	Incumbent re-elected.	▌ ✓ Lee E. Emerson (Republican) 52.0%; ▌ Robert W. Larrow (Democratic) 39.8%; ▌ Henry D. Vail (write-in) (Independent) 8.3%
Washington	Arthur B. Langlie	Republican	1948	Incumbent re-elected.	▌ ✓ Arthur B. Langlie (Republican) 52.7%; ▌ Hugh Mitchell (Democratic) 47.4%
West Virginia	Okey Patteson	Democratic	1948	Incumbent term-limited. Democratic hold.	▌ ✓ William C. Marland (Democratic) 51.5%; ▌ Rush Holt Sr. (Republican) 48.5%
Wisconsin	Walter J. Kohler Jr.	Republican	1950	Incumbent re-elected.	▌ ✓ Walter J. Kohler Jr. (Republican) 62.5%; ▌William Proxmire (Democratic) 37.3%; ▌ Michael Essin (Independent Progressive) 0.2%

== Closest races ==
States where the margin of victory was under 1%:

1. Michigan, 0.30%
2. Massachusetts, 0.62%

States where the margin of victory was under 5%:

1. Montana, 1.92%
2. West Virginia, 3.09%
3. Iowa, 4.12%
4. Delaware, 4.22%
5. Illinois, 4.96%

States where the margin of victory was under 10%:

1. Missouri, 5.18%
2. Rhode Island, 5.24%
3. Washington, 5.30%
4. New Mexico, 7.52%

Red denotes states won by Republicans. Blue denotes states won by Democrats.

== See also ==
- 1952 United States elections
  - 1952 United States presidential election
  - 1952 United States Senate elections
  - 1952 United States House of Representatives elections
