= Werriwa by-election =

Werriwa by-election may refer to one of five elections for the Australian House of Representatives seat of Werriwa:

- 1912 Werriwa by-election
- 1952 Werriwa by-election
- 1978 Werriwa by-election
- 1994 Werriwa by-election
- 2005 Werriwa by-election
