= Wingham =

Wingham may refer to:

== Places ==
- Wingham, Kent, a village in England
  - River Wingham, a river flowing through Wingham, Kent, England
- Wingham, New South Wales in Australia
  - St Andrew's Presbyterian Church, Wingham, Australia
- Wingham, Ontario in Huron County, Canada
  - Wingham Bulls, a senior hockey team based out of Wingham, Ontario, Canada
  - Wingham/Richard W. LeVan Aerodrome, near Wingham, Ontario
  - Wingham Ironmen, an ice hockey team in Wingham, Ontario

== People with the surname ==
- Duncan Wingham, Professor of Climate Physics at University College London
- Henry Wingham, Lord Chancellor of England (1255–1260) and Bishop of London
- Thomas Wingham (1846-1893), English musician, known as a teacher
