= Josephine Cashman =

Aboriginal Australian lawyer and entrepreneur

Josephine Amy Cashman is an Aboriginal Australian lawyer of Warrimay heritage. Cashman was an inaugural member of the Prime Minister's Indigenous Advisory Council in 2013, appointed by Tony Abbott and a candidate for the One Nation party in the 2022 Federal Election.

== Career ==
Cashman is a lawyer and businesswoman, and was an inaugural member of Prime Minister Tony Abbott's Indigenous Advisory Council in 2017. She addressed a UN Human Rights Council session focussing on violence against Indigenous girls and women.

Cashman's book, Lani's Story, was launched by the former Prime Minister, Tony Abbott, in 2013, after Cashman sent a copy to his office following her publisher being unable to fund a book launch.

Cashman was the chair of a public benevolent institution named Big River Impact Foundation. It aimed to establish a learning centre focused on building confidence with improving literacy, writing and public speaking skills. By doing so, it hoped to improve the confidence of Aboriginal women, encourage positive lifestyle choices, generate business opportunities, and improve employment outcomes for women and their communities.

On 8 November 2019, Cashman was appointed by the Minister for Indigenous Australians, Ken Wyatt, to the Senior Advisory Group responsible for planning an "Indigenous voice to government".

In late 2019, Cashman challenged author Bruce Pascoe on his Aboriginal identity claims. She said that he had benefited financially from falsely claiming to be Aboriginal, and requested that Peter Dutton (Australian Minister for Home Affairs) investigate the matter. On 24 December 2019, Dutton referred the issue to the Australian Federal Police, who determined no offence had been identified.

On 28 January 2020, Wyatt removed Cashman from the Senior Advisory Group after she was found to have provided a letter to conservative commentator Andrew Bolt, alleged to be from Yolngu elder Terry Yumbulul, supporting Cashman and denouncing Bruce Pascoe and his book Dark Emu. Bolt published it on his Herald Sun blog on 26 January 2020. The next day, Yumbulul released a statement saying that he had neither authored the letter nor given permission for it to be published in his name. Cashman said she helped Yumbulul write the letter at his request, and he had multiple communications with her about its content.

Cashman has called for a formal register to assess people's Aboriginality. Wyatt rejected the idea of a national register and said the government should play no role in determining a person's Aboriginal identity.

In 2019, Cashman was an ambassador for the Australian Indigenous Education Foundation.

In April 2022, Cashman was named as the Pauline Hanson's One Nation candidate for the New South Wales Division of Lyne at the 2022 Australian federal election. Cashman did not win the seat.

Cashman has been accused of spreading misinformation about COVID-19 Vaccine testing.

== Family ==
Cashman has an older sister, two brothers, a step-brother and step-sister, and a son. She belongs to the Warrimay, has extended family links to Aranda peoples, and has connections with Marika and Yunupingu people in Eastern Arnhem Land, and with the south coast of New South Wales and eastern Victoria.
