= Indigenous Advisory Council =

Advisory body appointed by the Australian Government (2017–

Agency overview
- Formed: 23 September 2013
- Dissolved: 2019
- Jurisdiction: Australia

The Indigenous Advisory Council (IAC), also known as the Prime Minister's Indigenous Advisory Council, existed between 2013 and 2019.

It was established by then Prime Minister of Australia, Tony Abbott. The council was created on 25 September 2013, announced on 23 November 2013, and its inaugural meeting was on 5 December 2013.

The Indigenous Advisory Council was an advisory board, its type classified as "Ministerial Councils and Related Bodies including those Established by the COAG". Its terms of reference were outlined at the first meeting, with its purpose stated as "to provide advice to the Government on Indigenous affairs, and was intended to focus on practical changes to improve the lives of Aboriginal and Torres Strait Islander people". Its size was set at 12 people, comprising both Indigenous and non-Indigenous Australians, who would meet three times each year.

Malcolm Turnbull, who became Prime Minister in 2015, established the Indigenous Policy Committee of Cabinet in 2016, to "support better engagement with Cabinet Ministers, their portfolios and Aboriginal and Torres Strait Islander people, including through collaboration with the Indigenous Advisory Council". He temporarily suspended the IAC at the end of January 2017, with its initial terms of reference being wound up on that date.

Six members were appointed for a second term of the council, announced on 8 February 2017, with a further appointment on 22 May 2017. No chairs were appointed to the IAC for its second term, in a deliberate move by Turnbull. (However, at some point since then, co-chairs were appointed.) The co-chair of the National Congress of Australia's First Peoples, Jackie Huggins, expressed a wish to work with the new body.

The Indigenous Advisory Council ceased in 2019.

== Members ==
The inaugural members were:

- Warren Mundine (chair)
- Richard Ah Mat
- Leah Armstrong
- Ngiare Brown
- Josephine Cashman
- Gail Kelly
- Djambawa Marawili
- Bruce Martin
- David Peever
- Andrew Penfold
- Peter Shergold
- Daniel Tucker

Second term members, from February 2017, were:

- Chris Sarra, founder and chair of the Stronger Smarter Institute
- Andrea Mason, CEO of the NPY Women's Council
- Roy Ah See, chair of the New South Wales Aboriginal Land Council
- Susan Murphy, CEO of Winun Ngari Aboriginal Corporation
- Ngiare Brown, Professor of Indigenous Health at the University of Wollongong
- Djambawa Marawili, artist and traditional owner from Baniyala, on Blue Mud Bay in the Northern Territory

In June 2018, after Sarra's departure, Ah See was appointed co-chair in his place. Mason departed at some point before the council ceased.
