= Jim Eggins =

Australian politician

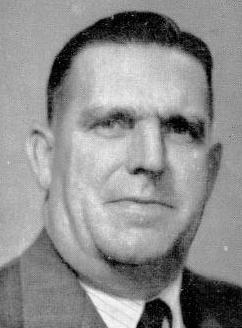

Member of the Australian Parliament for Lyne
- In office 10 December 1949 – 28 January 1952
- Preceded by: New seat
- Succeeded by: Philip Lucock

Personal details
- Born: Eldred James Eggins; 7 April 1898 Grafton, New South Wales
- Died: 28 January 1952 (aged 53) Darlinghurst, New South Wales, Australia
- Party: Australian Country Party
- Occupation: Farmer

Eldred James Eggins (7 April 1898 – 28 January 1952) was an Australian politician and a member of the Country Party of Australia.

Jim Eggins was born at Grafton, New South Wales and educated in state schools. He served in the military in 1918 and later grew bananas in the Brunswick River region, and was a seed merchant in Lismore. He also served on Lismore City Council, including as mayor in 1932, 1935 and 1936.

Eggins served as the Chairman of the New South Wales Fodder and Conservation Board. He was also Chairman of the New South Wales Country Party from 1945 till 1949.

He served in the New South Wales Legislative Council between April 1940 and October 1949. He was elected as the member for the Division of Lyne in the Australian House of Representatives in 1949, and was re-elected in 1951.

Eggins died in office on 28 January 1952, a day after being admitted to St Vincent's Hospital, Sydney, with a "cerebral condition". He had two sons and four daughters, with one son killed in World War II. His death prompted the 1952 Lyne by-election at which Philip Lucock retained the seat for the Country Party.

Parliament of Australia
New division	Member for Lyne; 1949–1952	Succeeded by Philip Lucock
