= St Andrew's Presbyterian Church, Wingham =

St Andrew's Presbyterian Church
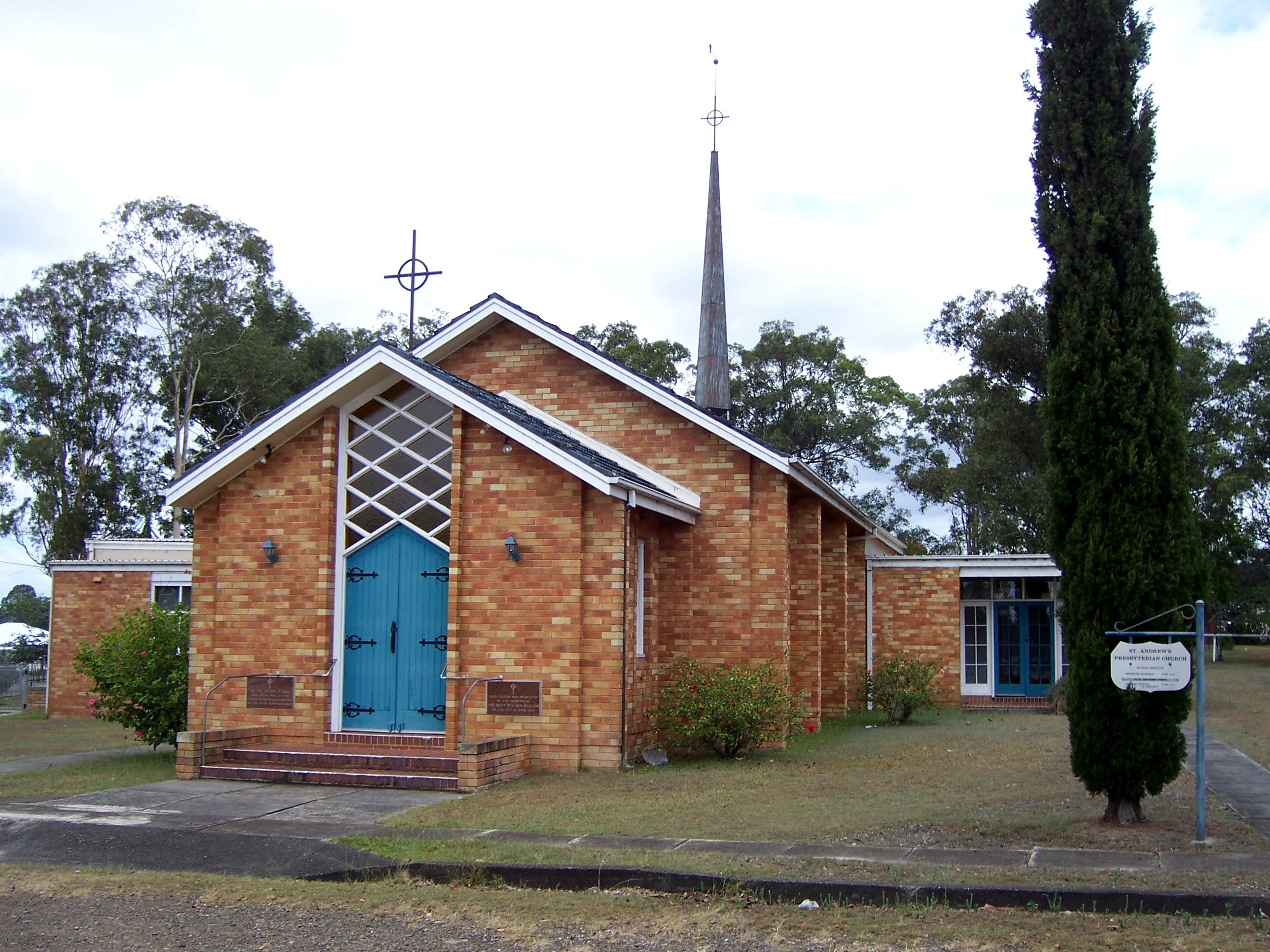
- St Andrew's Presbyterian Church, pictured in 2007
- St Andrew's Presbyterian Church
- 31°52′20″S 152°21′57″E
- Location: 32 Moon Street, Wingham, New South Wales
- Country: Australia
- Denomination: Presbyterian

History
- Status: Church
- Dedication: Saint Andrew

Architecture
- Functional status: Active
- Architectural type: Church
- Completed: c. 1970s

Specifications
- Capacity: 120 people
- Materials: Brick

Administration
- Division: New South Wales
- Parish: Wingham and Upper Manning

St Andrew's Presbyterian Church is a Presbyterian church at 32 Moon Street, Wingham, New South Wales, Australia. Together with St Thomas' Presbyterian Church, Krambach, the St Andrew's congregation forms part of the Wingham and Upper Manning Parish.

St Andrew's is located on a 1.2-hectare (3-acre) triangular block formed by Moon Street, Gloucester Road, and Fotheringham Street in Wingham. St. Andrew's is towards the apex at the corner of Moon Street and Gloucester Road. The manse is located at the Fotheringham Street end of the block, however the manse is not the home of the current minister.

== Church building ==
The church building is a yellow brick building from the 1970s and replaced the original wooden church built in 1856 in Canget Street, one block east of the Wingham Memorial Hall.

The site of the new church was donated to the parish many years before the new church was built for the purpose of providing a manse. The manse was built in 1898 and has since undergone several alterations.

Part of the funding for the new building was provided by a scheme subsidising the building of World War II memorials. There is a roll of honour in the porch.

The building itself includes a sanctuary with seating for 120 people, a vestry off to the right and the hall to the left. Inside the church an enclosed pulpit is located to the left of the congregations view, and a lectern on the right. Further right from the lectern is seating for a choir of 30. Directly behind the lectern is the baptismal font. In the centre between the font and the organ is the Communion Table and seating for the minister and 8 elders. Behind the pulpit is a large chair for the preacher and the new organ. The original organ was donated by the former minister Rev. Philip Lucock. At the very back of the church is a large stand on which flowers are placed and above that on the back wall is a large celtic cross.

Although the original plans included the church hall, it was not expected that it would be built at the same time as the new church, but the parish decided that it could afford to do so. The original plans included only a small kitchen and did not include public facilities, which were added, but are located a long way from the body of the hall, and even further from the church itself.

Similar churches by the same architect are Port Macquarie Presbyterian Church, the Presbyterian Church at Rutherford, New South Wales, and a church at Leura in the Blue Mountains.

== Parish ==
The Wingham and Upper Manning Parish was established in 1883 by its division form the Taree and Lower Manning Parish. At the time the parish formerly included congregations at Ashlea, Bo Bo, Bobin, Callighan's Creek, Cedar Party Creek, Cooplacurripa, Cucumbark, Kauthi, Krambach, Killawarra, Kimbriki, Kilibakh Creek, Glen Lewis, Giro, Nowendoc, No. 1, Wherral Flat, and Woodside (near Mt George). In the mid-1990s a congregation at Comboyne joined the neighbouring parish of Wauchope.

== See also ==
- Presbyterian Church of Australia
