= Robert W. Larrow =

American judge

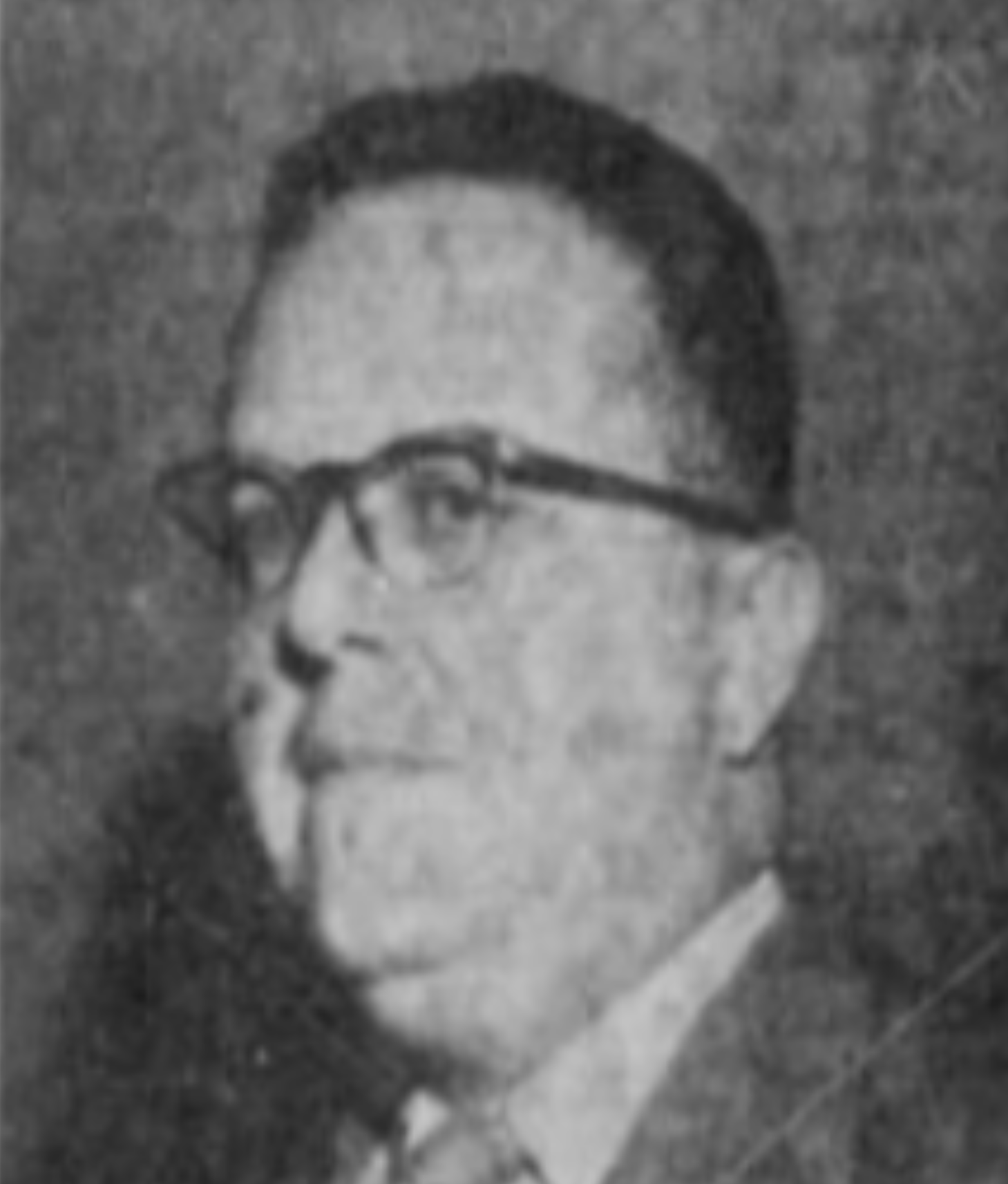
Larrow in 1952

Robert W. Larrow (April 27, 1916 – August 2, 1991) was an American attorney, politician, and judge from Vermont. He served as an associate justice of the Vermont Supreme Court for seven years. The Vermont Encyclopedia describes him as "among a small group that led to the revitalization of the Vermont Democratic Party in the 1950s and 1960s, ending the Republican hegemony in Vermont."

== Early life and education ==
Larrow was born in Vergennes, Vermont, on April 27, 1916. He attended the Vergennes schools and graduated from the College of the Holy Cross and Harvard Law School, receiving his law degree in 1939. He then entered into partnership with Joseph A. McNamara as the firm of McNamara & Larrow.

== Legal and political career ==
Larrow served as Burlington city attorney for nineteen years, from 1944 to 1963. He was elected to the Vermont House of Representatives in 1949, serving until 1951.

Larrow unsuccessfully ran for governor in 1952 against incumbent Lee E. Emerson. Emerson was broadly unpopular, and had barely beaten back a challenge in the Republican primary from maverick state senator Henry D. Vail. At the time, Larrow was thirty-six years old and known for being "bright and articulate," with "considerable energy and drive despite his Sydney Greenstreet-like girth." With his "diligent work habits and sharp wit, Larrow ran a vigorous campaign": he lost, but received 60,051 votes, some 40 percent of the vote: a record high for a Democratic candidate for governor, and nearly 40,000 more votes than the Democratic candidate had received in 1950. Larrow's run was the first time in decades that a Democrat had actively and credibly campaigned for governor, and a sign of the resurgence of the Democratic party in Vermont after decades of Republican dominance.

He ran as the Democratic candidate for state attorney general in 1962, on a ticket with Philip H. Hoff; Larrow lost to Charles E. Gibson Jr., but Hoff won, becoming the first Democratic governor of Vermont in more than a hundred years. The next year, Larrow unsuccessfully ran for mayor of Burlington.

Larrow was chairman of the State Liquor Control Board from 1963 to 1966, and a Superior Court judge from 1966 to 1974

== Vermont Supreme Court and later life ==
Larrow became an associate justice of the Vermont Supreme Court in 1974. He was the last state supreme court justice in Vermont to be elected by the Vermont General Assembly; an amendment to the Vermont Constitution gave the power of appointment to the governor.

Larrow retired from the state supreme court in 1981, after seven years on the bench, at the age of sixty-five. Vermont Chief Assistant Attorney General Louis P. Peck was appointed to replace him.

Larrow died on August 2, 1991, at the age of seventy-five, after a long illness. Larrow was buried at New Mount Calvary Cemetery in Burlington.

== Notes ==
Party political offices
Preceded by John Edward Moran	Democratic nominee for Governor of Vermont; 1952	Succeeded by E. Frank Branon
Preceded by Joseph F. Radigan	Democratic nominee for Vermont Attorney General; 1962	Succeeded by John P. Connarn
