= Edward F. Arn =

32nd Governor of Kansas (1906–1998)

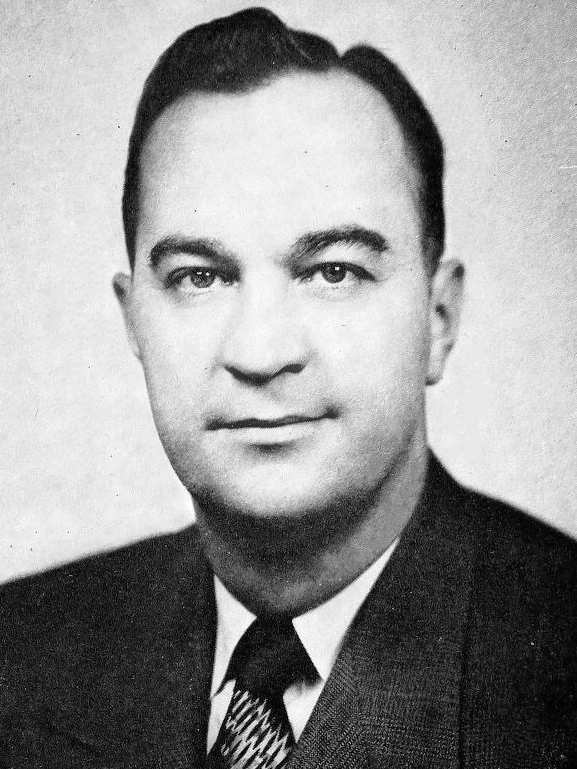

32nd Governor of Kansas
- In office January 8, 1951 – January 10, 1955
- Lieutenant: Fred Hall
- Preceded by: Frank L. Hagaman
- Succeeded by: Fred Hall

31st Kansas Attorney General
- In office 1947–1949
- Governor: Frank Carlson
- Preceded by: Alexander Baldwin Mitchell
- Succeeded by: Harold Ralph Fatzer

Personal details
- Born: Edward Ferdinand Arn; May 19, 1906 Kansas City, Kansas, U.S.
- Died: January 22, 1998 (aged 91) Wichita, Kansas, U.S.
- Party: Republican
- Spouse(s): Marcella Tillmans; Catherine Ross
- Children: 2
- Education: Kansas City Junior College; University of Kansas; Kansas City School of Law
- Profession: Attorney, judge

Edward Ferdinand Arn (May 19, 1906 – January 22, 1998) was an American lawyer and politician who served as the 32nd governor of Kansas from 1951 to 1955. A member of the Republican Party, he previously was the 31st attorney general of Kansas from 1947 to 1949. He was the first governor of Kansas to have been born in the 20th century.

== Biography ==
Arn grew up in Kansas City, Kansas, and attended Kansas City Junior College, the University of Kansas, and the Kansas City School of Law. He was married twice — to Marcella Ruth Tillmans on October 28, 1933 and to Catherine Phillipi Ross. He had two children.

== Career ==
Arn practiced law in Wichita, Kansas, until he enlisted in the U.S. Navy. He served as a lieutenant aboard an aircraft carrier that fought in Iwo Jima.

Returning to his law practice, Arn became active in local politics and served as Chairman of the Wyandotte County Republicans. From 1947 to 1949, he served as Attorney General of Kansas, and as a justice of the Kansas Supreme Court from 1949 to 1951.

Arn won the Republican gubernatorial nomination was elected Governor of Kansas in 1950, re-elected in 1952, and served from 1951 to 1955. This made him the first Governor of Kansas born in the 20th century. During his tenure, the Kansas Turnpike Authority was established, workman's compensation benefits were improved, the Kansas Veteran's Commission was formed, a state department of administration was organized, and the destructive floods of 1951 were dealt with.

Arn left office on January 10, 1955, and returned to Wichita to practice law. He was a delegate to the Republican National Convention in 1960. He ran unsuccessfully for the United States Senate in 1962.

== Death ==
Arn died in a hospital in Wichita, Kansas, on January 22, 1998, and is interred at the Old Mission Chapel Mausoleum in Wichita.

Party political offices
Preceded by Alexander Baldwin Mitchell	Republican nominee for Kansas Attorney General; 1946, 1948	Succeeded by Harold Ralph Fatzer
Preceded by Frank Carlson	Republican nominee for Governor of Kansas; 1950, 1952	Succeeded by Fred Hall
Political offices
Preceded by Frank L. Hagaman	Governor of Kansas; 1951–1955	Succeeded by Fred Hall
