= Philip Lucock =

Australian politician

Philip Lucock CBE
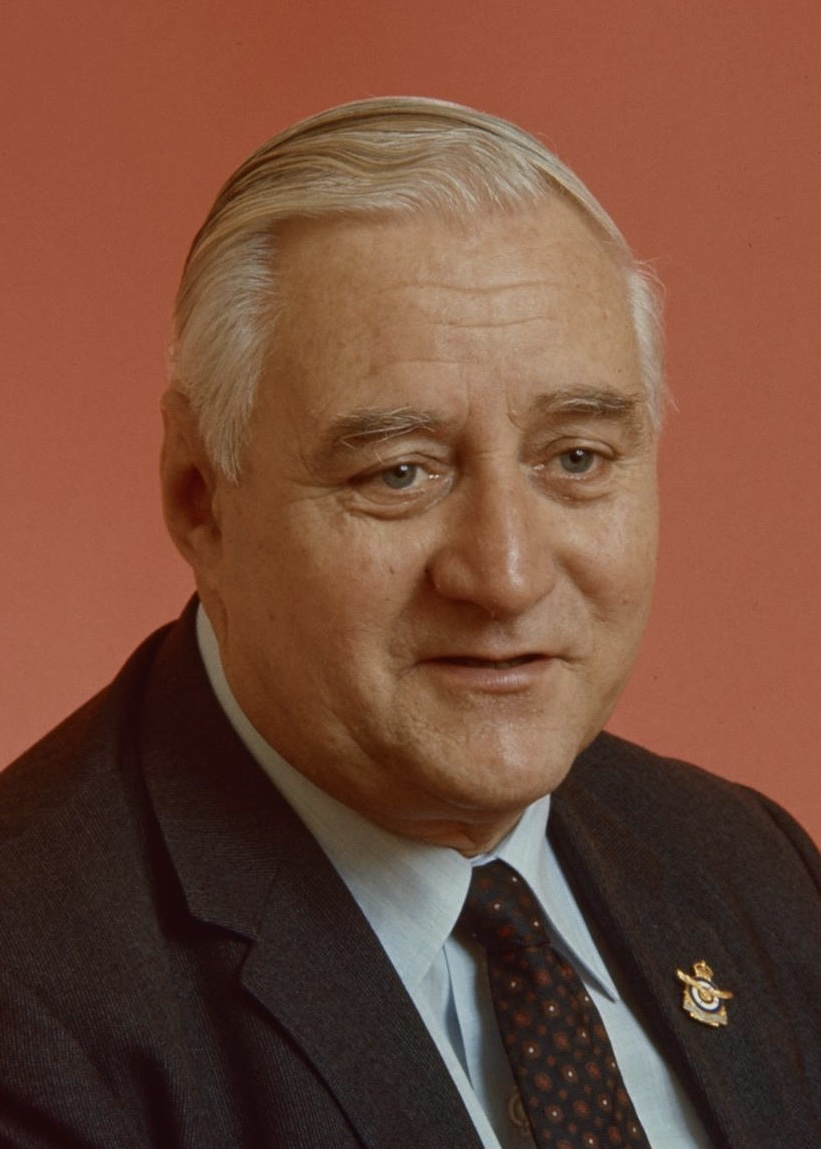
- Lucock in 1974

Member of the Australian Parliament for Lyne
- In office 22 March 1952 – 19 September 1980
- Preceded by: Jim Eggins
- Succeeded by: Bruce Cowan

Personal details
- Born: 16 January 1916 Eltham, Kent, England
- Died: 8 August 1996 (aged 80) Brisbane, Queensland, Australia
- Party: Australian Country Party
- Profession: Presbyterian minister, Politician

Philip Ernest Lucock, CBE (16 January 1916 – 8 August 1996) was an Australian politician and Presbysterian minister. He served in the House of Representatives from 1952 to 1980, representing the Division of Lyne for the Country Party. He was Deputy Speaker for a record span of over 13 years.

== Early life ==
Lucock was born on 16 January 1916 in Eltham, Kent, England. He was the second of three surviving children born to Grace Miriam (née Bishop) and Alan Lucock. His father worked as a shell gauger at the Royal Arsenal and later opened a hair salon, while his mother was a dressmaker's apprentice before her marriage.

In 1923, Lucock and his family immigrated to New Zealand. They lived for periods in Dunedin, Timaru, and Christchurch, where his father ran salons. He attended Timaru Boys' High School (1929) and Christchurch Technical College (1930–1931), but had to leave school at the age of 14 to assist the family business during the Great Depression. Lucock later worked at a service station and at James Hay's department store in Christchurch. He moved to Sydney in 1937 and became a salesman at Anthony Hordern & Sons.

== Religious work and military service ==
Lucock had been active in the Presbyterian Church in New Zealand and after moving to Australia decided to pursue ministerial training. In 1939 he became a home missionary in Paterson, New South Wales. Ineligible to serve as a military chaplain, he joined the Royal Australian Air Force (RAAF) in 1941 and trained as a pilot at Somers, Victoria, and then at Rhodesia under the Empire Air Training Plan. He was sent back to Australia after four months due to being diagnosed with a kidney disorder and was discharged in August 1942 with the rank of leading aircraftman.

After his discharge, Lucock was a home missionary at Wollomombi from 1943 to 1945. He later served at Blacktown (while studying at St Andrew's Theological Hall and at Wingham. He was ordained as a minister in 1948 and became the parish minister of St Andrew's Presbyterian Church, Wingham.

== Political career ==
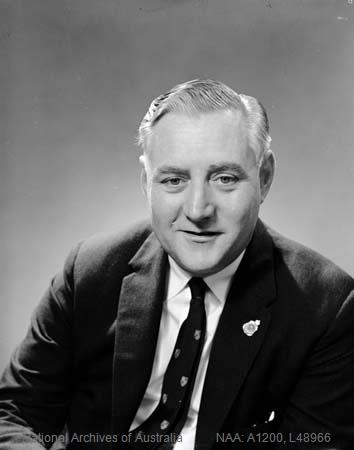
Lucock in 1964

One year after he was ordained, Lucock stood as one of four candidates for the Country Party of Australia in the newly created seat of Lyne. He polled third behind Jim Eggins, who won the seat for the Country Party, and the Labor candidate Edward Hayes.

Lucock did not stand at the 1951 poll, but on the death of Jim Eggins in January 1952 a by-election was called. Lucock and Donald Lancaster stood for the Country Party against Edward Hayes. The presence of two Country Party candidates split the vote and Hayes took three thousand votes more than either Lucock or Lancaster, but with preferences from Lancaster, Lucock easily won the seat. When he was sworn in as the member for Lyne on 22 March 1952 Philip Lucock became the first member of the House of Representatives to swear allegiance to Queen Elizabeth II who had ascended to the throne on 6 February.

Once elected Philip Lucock served in the government of Sir Robert Menzies as Deputy Speaker of the House of Representatives. Lucock also served in this role under Prime Ministers Harold Holt, John Gorton, William McMahon and Malcolm Fraser.

At the 1954 election Donald Lancaster, Lucock's running partner for the 1952 by election, stood against him as the Labor Party candidate. Although he gained 11.4 percent of the vote Lancaster's presence did not stop Lucock from gaining re-election.

In 1969 the seat of Lyne underwent redistribution, with the electorate area moving southward. Although the Labor Party increased its vote by 2 thousand, this did not have any great effect on the result of the election, with Philip Lucock winning by more than ten thousand votes.

Lyne was again redistributed in 1977 with the electorate again contracting from the north. Lucock retained the seat with a margin of 11.4 percent over Labor.

== Retirement ==
After more than 28 years in the Australian Parliament Philip Lucock retired at the 1980 election. He was succeeded by Bruce Cowan. After leaving Parliament he served as Moderator of the Presbyterian Church. He retired to Queensland, living in the Brisbane suburb of Keperra until his death in 1996. His funeral was held in Brisbane and a memorial service was held at St. Andrew's Presbyterian Church, Wingham, and each were attended by representatives of the Commonwealth Parliament.

Parliament of Australia
Preceded by Jim Eggins	Member for Lyne; 1952–1980	Succeeded by Bruce Cowan
