= 1950 Kansas gubernatorial election =

- November 7, 1950
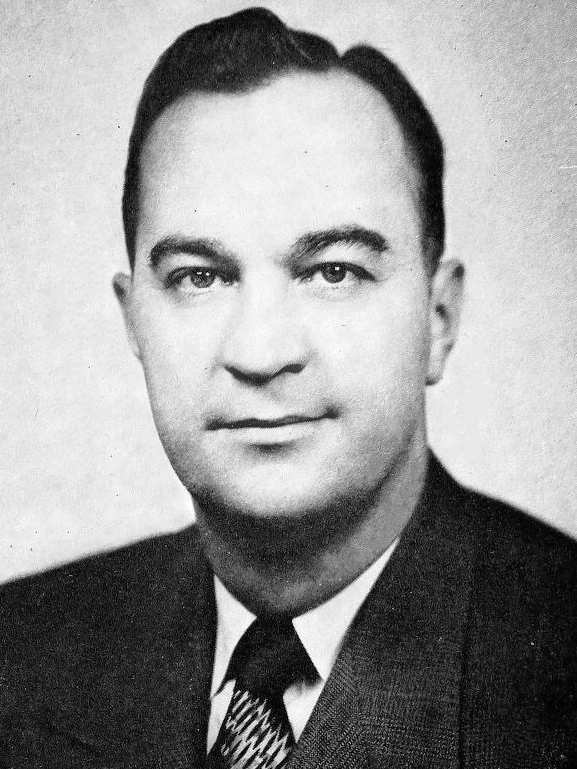

Nominee	Edward F. Arn	Kenneth T. Anderson
Party	Republican	Democratic
Popular vote	333,001	275,494
Percentage	53.77%	44.48%
- County results Arn: 40–50% 50–60% 60–70% Anderson: 40–50% 50–60%
Governor before election
Frank Carlson
Republican
Elected Governor
Edward F. Arn
Republican

The 1950 Kansas gubernatorial election was held on November 7, 1950. Republican nominee Edward F. Arn defeated Democratic nominee Kenneth T. Anderson with 53.77% of the vote.

== Primary elections ==
Primary elections were held on August 1, 1950.

=== Democratic primary ===
==== Candidates ====
- Kenneth T. Anderson
- John A. Potucek
- August F. Koch

==== Results ====
Democratic primary results
Party	Candidate	Votes	%
Democratic	Kenneth T. Anderson	52,718	55.03
Democratic	John A. Potucek	30,101	31.42
Democratic	August F. Koch	12,977	13.55
Total votes		95,796	100.00

=== Republican primary ===
==== Candidates ====
- Edward F. Arn, Associate Justice of the Kansas Supreme Court
- Willard Mayberry
- Frank L. Hagaman, incumbent Lieutenant Governor
- Kathryn K. Hitchings

==== Results ====
Republican primary results
Party	Candidate	Votes	%
Republican	Edward F. Arn	132,772	54.95
Republican	Willard Mayberry	85,139	35.24
Republican	Frank L. Hagaman	20,025	8.29
Republican	Kathryn K. Hitchings	3,684	1.53
Total votes		241,620	100.00

== General election ==
=== Candidates ===
Major party candidates

- Edward F. Arn, Republican
- Kenneth T. Anderson, Democratic

Other candidates

- C. Floyd Hester, Prohibition
- W. W. Tamplin, Socialist

=== Results ===
1950 Kansas gubernatorial election
Party	Candidate	Votes	%	±%
Republican	Edward F. Arn	333,001	53.77%	
Democratic	Kenneth T. Anderson	275,494	44.48%	
Prohibition	C. Floyd Hester	9,431	1.52%	
Socialist	W. W. Tamplin	1,384	0.22%	
Majority		57,507		
Turnout		619,310		
Republican hold		Swing		
