= David Gillespie (Australian politician) =

Australian politician and gastroenterologist

The Honourable David Gillespie
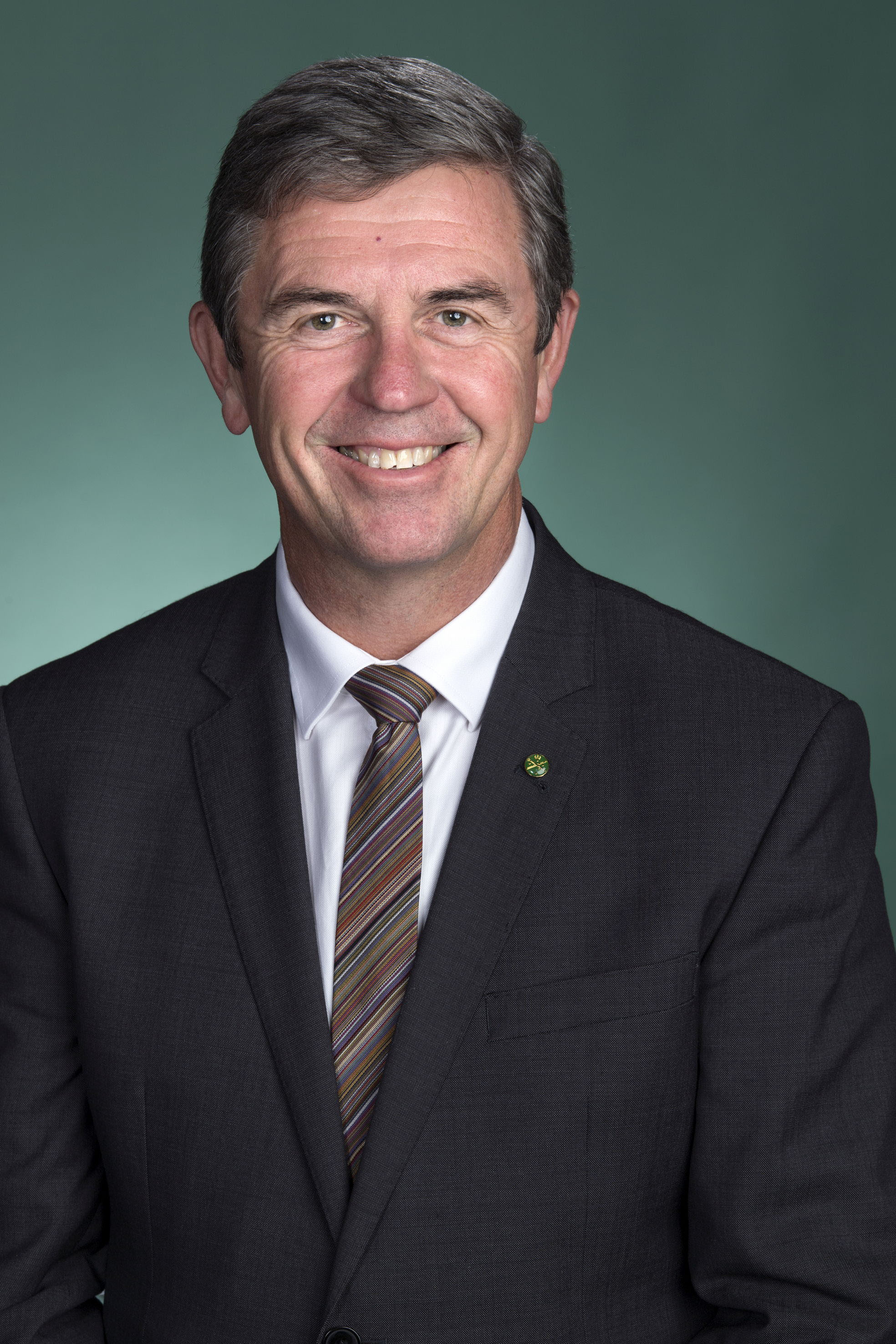
- Official portrait, 2019

Minister for Regional Health
- In office 2 July 2021 – 23 May 2022
- Prime Minister: Scott Morrison
- Preceded by: Mark Coulton
- Succeeded by: Emma McBride (as Assistant Minister for Rural and Regional Health)

Assistant Minister for Children and Families
- In office 20 December 2017 – 28 August 2018
- Prime Minister: Malcolm Turnbull; Scott Morrison
- Preceded by: New ministerial post
- Succeeded by: Michelle Landry

Assistant Minister for Health
- In office 24 January 2017 – 20 December 2017
- Prime Minister: Malcolm Turnbull
- Preceded by: Himself (as Assistant Minister for Rural Health)
- Succeeded by: Bridget McKenzie (as the Minister for Rural Health)

Assistant Minister for Rural Health
- In office 19 July 2016 – 24 January 2017
- Prime Minister: Malcolm Turnbull
- Preceded by: Fiona Nash (as Minister for Rural Health)
- Succeeded by: Himself (as Assistant Minister for Health)

Member of the Australian Parliament for Lyne
- In office 7 September 2013 – 28 March 2025
- Preceded by: Rob Oakeshott
- Succeeded by: Alison Penfold

Personal details
- Born: David Arthur Gillespie; 20 December 1957 (age 68) Canberra, Australian Capital Territory, Australia
- Party: The Nationals
- Spouse: Charlotte Gillespie
- Children: 3
- Education: University of Sydney
- Profession: Gastroenterologist
- Website: Official website

David Arthur Gillespie (born 20 December 1957) is an Australian politician and gastroenterologist. He is a member of the National Party and he served in the House of Representatives from 2013 to 2025, representing the New South Wales seat of Lyne. He held ministerial portfolios during the Turnbull and Morrison governments as Assistant Minister for Rural Health (2016–2017), Assistant Minister for Health (2017), Assistant Minister for Children and Families (2017–2018), Minister for Regional Health (2021–2022), and Minister Assisting the Minister for Trade and Investment (2021–2022).

== Early life ==
Gillespie was born in Canberra and educated at Saint Ignatius' College, Riverview. He was a gastroenterologist for twenty years and, up until the 2013 election, was the director of physician training at Port Macquarie Base Hospital.

== Politics ==
Gillespie contested the seat of Lyne for the first time in 2010. While he lost to the incumbent, National-turned-independent Rob Oakeshott, he achieved an 11-point swing in his favour. Following Oakeshott's retirement at the 2013 federal election, Gillespie contested the seat again and won it resoundingly. During Oakeshott's tenure, Lyne remained a comfortably safe Nationals seat in a traditional two-party matchup with Labor, so it had been expected that the seat would revert to the Nationals once Oakeshott retired.

=== Turnbull government ===
After the re-election of the Turnbull government at the 2016 federal election, Gillespie was appointed Assistant Minister for Rural Health in a ministerial reshuffle. He was promoted to Assistant Minister for Health in a subsequent rearrangement of the ministry in January 2017. He was instead made Assistant Minister for Children and Families in December 2017.

In 2015, Gillespie argued that politicians who represent electorates larger than 10,000 square kilometres (such as his own) should receive additional expense payments.

In February 2018, Gillespie was briefly a candidate to replace Barnaby Joyce as National Party leader. After finding a lack of support for his candidacy within the party room, he withdrew from the race and endorsed Michael McCormack, the only other announced candidate.

Gillespie was not retained in the ministry when Scott Morrison replaced Turnbull as prime minister in August 2018. Gillespie said he was "disappointed but it is a very competitive space, and the reshuffle is a reflection of how much talent we have". He also stated that "the general electorate was pretty disgusted with all the factional wars that we saw played out in public".

=== Morrison government ===
Following the resignation of Bridget McKenzie, Gillespie stood unsuccessfully for the deputy leadership of the National Party in February 2020. He was defeated by David Littleproud, with Keith Pitt also running. In the lead-up to the vote, Gillespie criticised party leader Michael McCormack's lack of engagement with the national media. McCormack defeated Barnaby Joyce in a leadership ballot, and Gillespie subsequently stated that "the leader has our full support" and that another challenge to McCormack's leadership was unlikely. In 2021, Barnaby Joyce successfully challenged McCormack for the National Party leadership.

In the cabinet reshuffle in late June 2021, Gillespie was appointed as the Minister for Regional Health. He held the position until the Coalition's defeat at the 2022 federal election.

== Parliamentary eligibility ==
Gillespie came under scrutiny after the High Court ruling in the Bob Day case. In April 2017, the High Court found that, under section 44(v) of the Australian Constitution, Senator Bob Day had not been eligible to hold public office because of an indirect pecuniary relationship with the Australian government. The Australian Labor Party (ALP) opposition and some community groups believed that Gillespie also had an indirect financial relationship with the federal government, in that he owned a suburban shopping complex in Port Macquarie which leased a premises to an Australia Post licensee. In July 2017, the ALP launched a High Court challenge to Gillespie's eligibility as an MP. The case was formally brought by Peter Alley, the ALP candidate for Gillespie's seat of Lyne at the 2016 federal election. Gillespie sold his interest in the shopping complex in early 2018, which would ensure his eligibility in a by-election if the court ruled that he was ineligible at the time of the 2016 election. On 21 March 2018, the seven members of the High Court determined unanimously that it did not have the jurisdiction to hear the case, unless the matter was referred to it by parliament.

== Personal life ==
Gillespie is married to Charlotte and they have three children. The family lives at Sancrox, west of Port Macquarie. He is a Roman Catholic.

== Honours ==
- Order of the Rising Sun, 3rd Class, Gold Rays with Neck Ribbon (2026)

Parliament of Australia
Preceded by Rob Oakeshott	Member for Lyne; 2013–2025	Succeeded by Alison Penfold
Political offices
New ministerial post	Assistant Minister for Children and Families; 2017–2018	Succeeded by Michelle Landry
Preceded by Himself as Assistant Minister for Rural Health	Assistant Minister for Health; 2017	Succeeded by Bridget McKenzie as Minister for Rural Health
Preceded by Fiona Nash as Minister for Rural Health	Assistant Minister for Rural Health; 2016–2017	Succeeded by Himself as Assistant Minister for Health
