= 1952 Louisiana lieutenant gubernatorial election =

- April 22, 1952

| Nominee | C. E. Barham | John McKeithen |
| Party | Democratic | Democratic |
| Popular vote | 452,337 | 315,179 |
| Percentage | 58.94% | 41.06% |
- Parish results Barham: 50–60% 60–70% 70–80% >90% McKeithen: 50–60% 60–70% 70–80%
Lieutenant Governor before election
Bill Dodd
Democratic
Elected Lieutenant Governor
C. E. Barham
Democratic

The 1952 Louisiana lieutenant gubernatorial election was held on April 22, 1952, in order to elect the lieutenant governor of Louisiana. Democratic nominee and incumbent member of the Louisiana State Senate C. E. Barham defeated Republican nominee Violet B. Allen.

== Democratic primary ==
The Democratic primary election was held on January 15, 1952, but as no candidate received a majority of the votes cast, a runoff was held on February 19, 1952, between candidate John McKeithen and state senator C. E. Barham. State senator C. E. Barham won the runoff with 58.94% of the vote, and was thus elected as the nominee for the general election.

=== Results ===
| Candidate | First Round | | Run-off | |
| Candidate | Votes | % | Votes | % |
|---|---|---|---|---|
| C. E. Barham | 138,506 | 18.93 | 452,337 | 58.94 |
| John McKeithen | 186,400 | 25.48 | 315,179 | 41.06 |
| Elmer Conner | 138,275 | 18.90 | | |
| Lionel Ott | 108,366 | 14.81 | | |
| Leon Gary | 86,205 | 11.78 | | |
| Hoffman Fuller | 50,479 | 6.90 | | |
| W. H. Talbot | 12,615 | 1.72 | | |
| P. E. Weldon | 10,663 | 1.46 | | |
| Total | 731,509 | 100.00 | 767,516 | 100.00 |

== General election ==
On election day, April 22, 1952, Democratic nominee C. E. Barham won the election by a margin of 109,550 votes against his opponent Republican nominee Violet B. Allen, thereby retaining Democratic control over the office of lieutenant governor. Barham was sworn in as the 43rd lieutenant governor of Louisiana on May 13, 1952.

=== Results ===
Louisiana lieutenant gubernatorial election, 1952
| Party | Candidate | Votes | % |
|---|---|---|---|
| Democratic | C. E. Barham | 114,186 | 96.10 |
| Republican | Violet B. Allen | 4,636 | 3.90 |
| Total votes | | 118,822 | 100.00 |
| Democratic hold | | | |
