= Alison Penfold =

Australian politician

Alison Penfold MP

Member of the Australian Parliament for Lyne
- Incumbent
- Assumed office 3 May 2025
- Preceded by: David Gillespie

Personal details
- Born: 3 June 1971 (age 55) Sydney, New South Wales, Australia
- Party: National
- Website: www.nswnationals.org.au/alisonpenfold/

Alison Louise Penfold (born 3 June 1971) is an Australian politician who is a member of the Australian Parliament for the Division of Lyne representing the National Party after winning the seat in the 2025 Australian federal election. She was raised and educated in the Manning Valley. From 2012 to 2016, Penfold was chief executive of the Australian Livestock Exporters’ Council.

She was a candidate in the 2022 Australian Senate election.

In May 2026, Penfold introduced a bill to alter the federal Sex Discrimination Act. The bill has been described as a "retrograde step" for women and LGBTQI+ community by Australia's sex discrimination commissioner.

Parliament of Australia
Preceded by David Gillespie	Member for Lyne; 2025–present	Incumbent
