= 1952 Vermont gubernatorial election =

- November 4, 1952
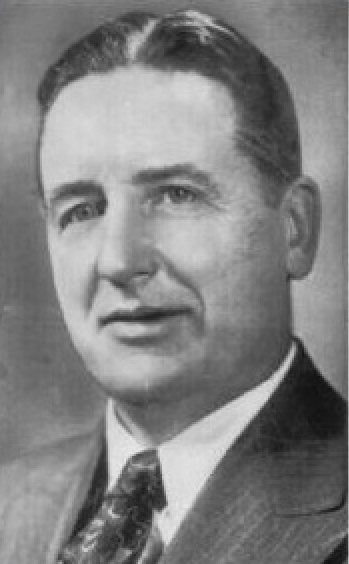

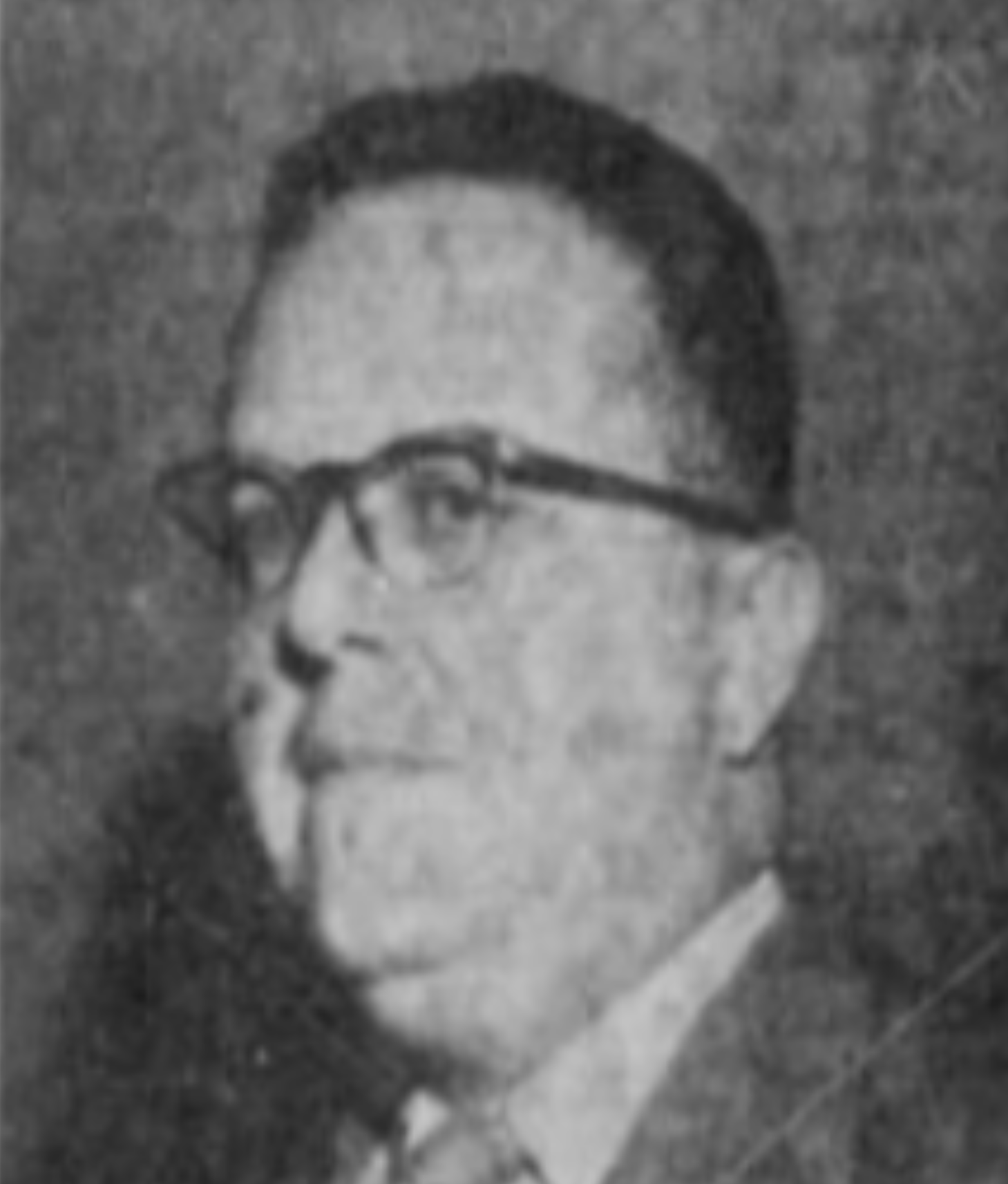

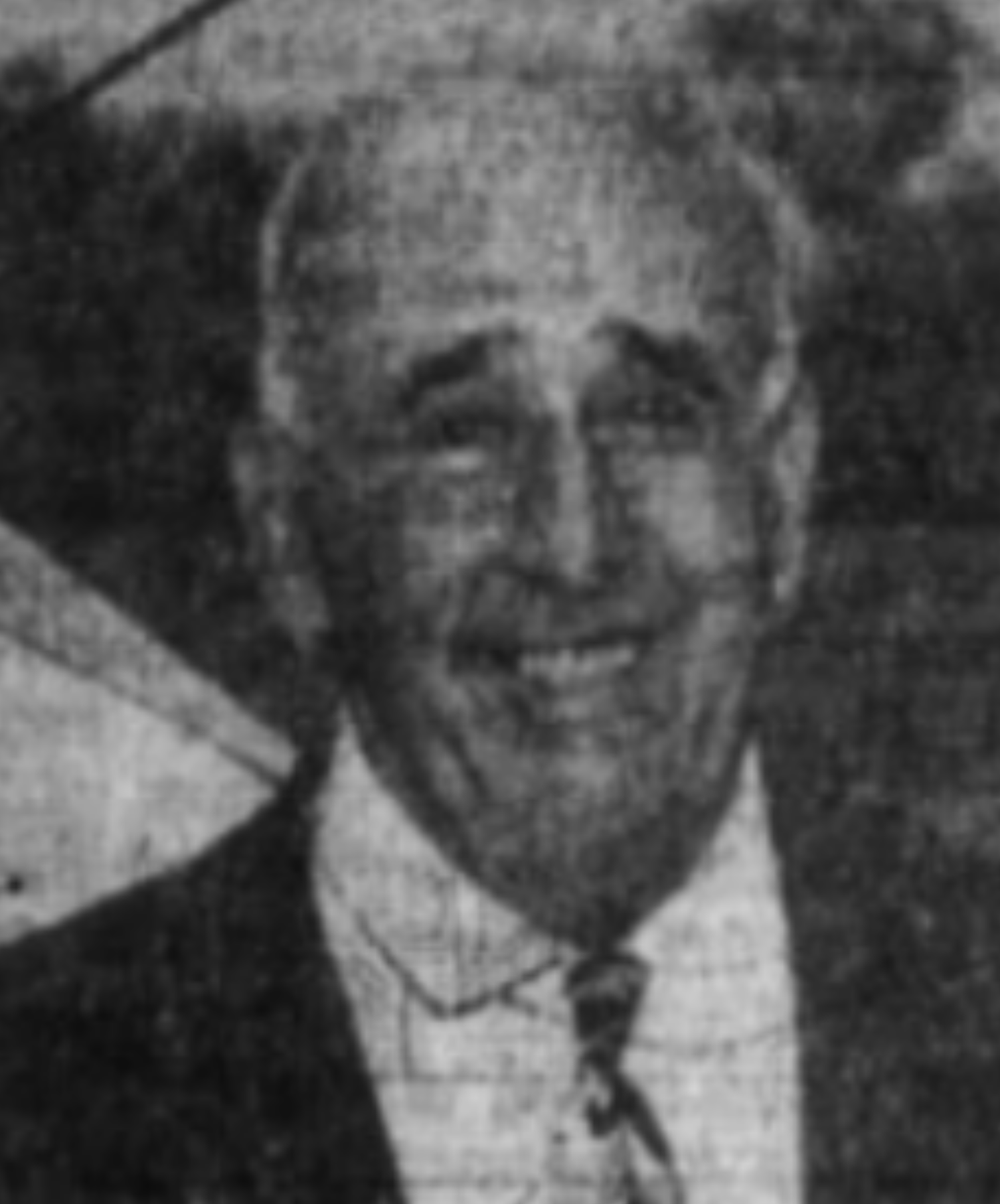
| Nominee | Lee E. Emerson | Robert W. Larrow | Henry D. Vail (write-in) |
| Party | Republican | Democratic | Independent Republican |
| Popular vote | 78,338 | 60,051 | 12,447 |
| Percentage | 51.93% | 39.80% | 8.25% |
- Emerson: 30–40% 40–50% 50–60% 60–70% 70–80% 80–90% 90-100% Larrow: 30–40% 40–50% 50–60% 60–70% 80–90% Vail: 30–40% 40–50% 50–60% No Vote/Data
Governor before election
Lee E. Emerson
Republican
Elected Governor
Lee E. Emerson
Republican

The 1952 Vermont gubernatorial election took place on November 4, 1952. Incumbent Republican Lee E. Emerson ran successfully for re-election to a second term as Governor of Vermont, defeating Democratic candidate Robert W. Larrow and write-in candidate Henry D. Vail.

== Republican primary ==
=== Candidates ===
- Lee E. Emerson, incumbent Governor of Vermont
- Henry D. Vail, state senator

=== Endorsements ===
Henry Vail

Individuals

- Merritt A. Edson, director of the National Rifle Association; former commissioner of the Vermont State Police, and former Major general

=== Results ===
Republican primary results
| Party | Candidate | Votes | % | ±% |
|---|---|---|---|---|
| Republican | Lee E. Emerson (inc.) | 35,296 | 51.9 | |
| Republican | Henry D. Vail | 32,698 | 48.1 | |
| Republican | Other | 12 | 0.0 | |
| Total votes | | 68,006 | 100.0 | |

== Democratic primary ==
=== Results ===
Democratic primary results
| Party | Candidate | Votes | % | ±% |
|---|---|---|---|---|
| Democratic | Robert W. Larrow | 5,184 | 98.8 | |
| Democratic | Other | 63 | 1.2 | |
| Total votes | | 5,247 | 100.0 | |

== General election ==
=== Results ===
1952 Vermont gubernatorial election
| Party | Candidate | Votes | % | ±% |
|---|---|---|---|---|
| Republican | Lee E. Emerson (inc.) | 78,338 | 51.93 | |
| Democratic | Robert W. Larrow | 60,051 | 39.80 | |
| Write-In | Henry D. Vail | 12,447 | 8.25 | |
| N/A | Other | 26 | 0.02 | |
| Total votes | | 150,862 | 100.0 | |
