= Division of Lyne =

Australian federal electoral division

Coordinates: 31.602°S 152.277°E

Lyne Australian House of Representatives Division
- Interactive map of electorate boundaries from the 2025 federal election
- Created: 1949
- MP: Alison Penfold
- Party: Nationals
- Namesake: Sir William Lyne
- Electors: 129,678 (2025)
- Area: 16,041 km^{2} (6,193.5 sq mi)
- Demographic: Rural
Electorates around Lyne:
| New England | Cowper | Pacific Ocean |
| New England | Lyne | Pacific Ocean |
| Hunter | Paterson | Pacific Ocean |

The Division of Lyne is an Australian electoral division in the state of New South Wales. It is on the Tasman Sea coast, stretching from Hawks Nest in the south to Lake Cathie in the north, comprising the inland city of Taree.

Since 2025 its MP has been Alison Penfold of the National Party.

== Geography ==
Since 1984, federal electoral division boundaries in Australia have been determined at redistributions by a redistribution committee appointed by the Australian Electoral Commission. Redistributions occur for the boundaries of divisions in a particular state, and they occur every seven years, or sooner if a state's representation entitlement changes or when divisions of a state are malapportioned.

It includes the city of Taree and the major towns of Dungog, Forster, Gloucester and Wauchope, as well as other smaller towns and some outer suburbs of Port Macquarie. It covers the entirety of both the Dungog Shire and the Mid-Coast Council, as well as parts of the Port Macquarie-Hastings Council.

== History ==
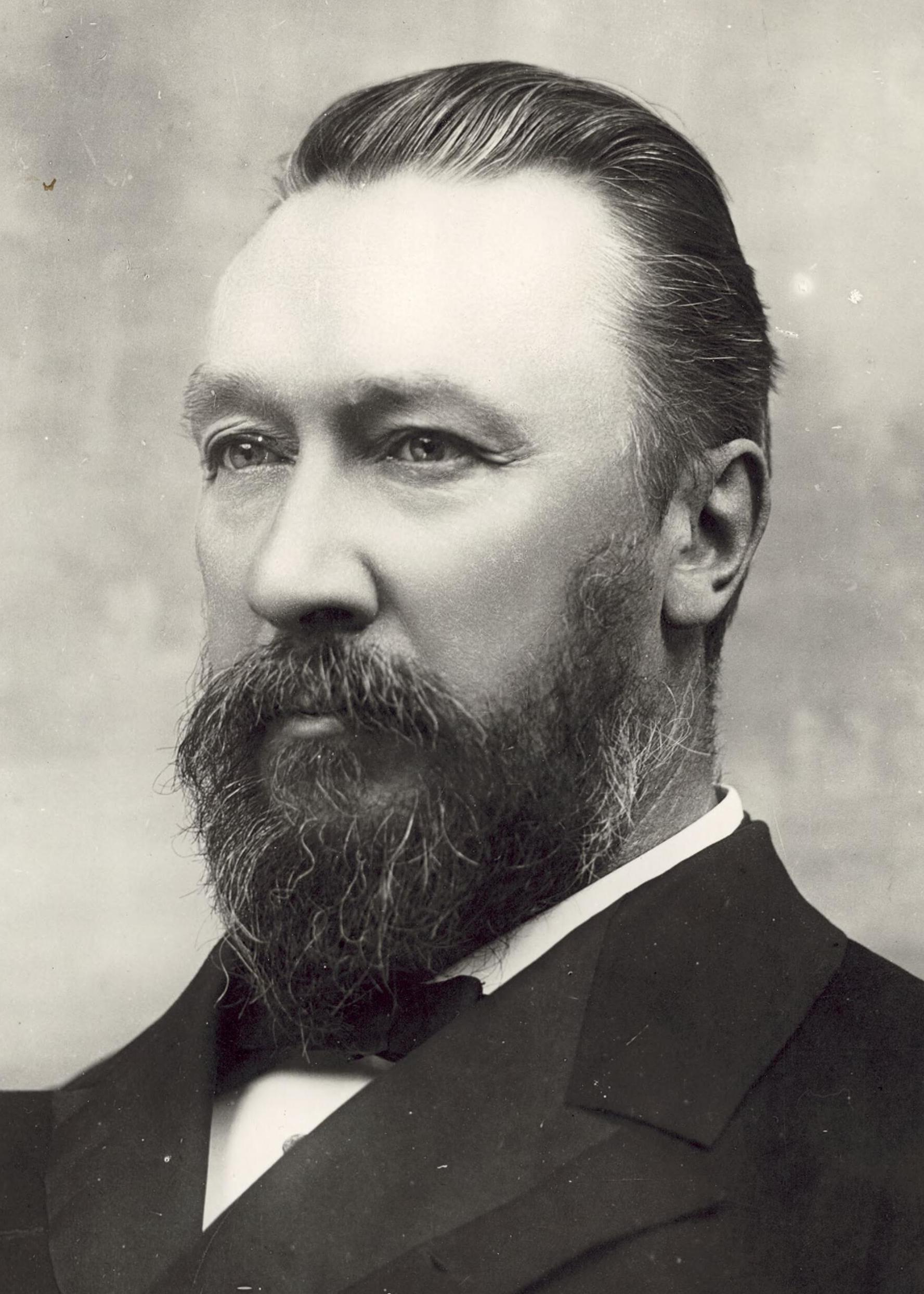
Sir William Lyne, the division's namesake

The division is named after Sir William Lyne, Premier of New South Wales at the time of Federation. He was commissioned by the first Governor-General, Lord Hopetoun to form the inaugural Federal Government, but was unable to attract sufficient support to form a cabinet and returned the commission. The unsuccessful commissioning of Lyne is known as The Hopetoun Blunder. Lyne subsequently served as a minister in the early Protectionist governments.

The Division of Lyne was created in a redistribution in 1949 and was represented by the National Party (previously the Country Party and National Country Party) for almost 60 years. This reflects the area's history as a strongly conservative and rural region. The division covers parts of southern Port Macquarie Hastings City and almost the entire Mid-Coast Council local government areas. The area has recently undergone significant demographic changes with the arrival of a large number of retired people and city dwellers seeking a sea-change. Despite these changes, the Australian Labor Party has made little headway in increasing its vote.

In 1993, after the exclusion of minor candidates, the Nationals' Mark Vaile led over the Liberals by only 233 votes on the third count. Labor had taken a large first-count lead, which it held for most of the night, but Vaile won after Liberal preferences flowed overwhelmingly to him. However, had 120 votes gone the other way, the Liberals would have taken the seat. Vaile later went on to become leader of the Nationals and Deputy Prime Minister during the latter stages of the Howard Government. He retired in July 2008, triggering a by-election later that year. The seat was lost to independent candidate and former state MP Rob Oakeshott, who retained the seat at the 2010 election.

Oakeshott announced on 26 June 2013 that he would not contest the 2013 election. It was widely expected that the seat would revert to the Nationals; despite Oakeshott's previous personal popularity, Lyne was still a comfortably safe National seat in a "traditional" two-party matchup with Labor. As expected, David Gillespie, who had been Oakeshott's opponent in 2010, easily reclaimed the seat for the Nationals.

Upon the retirement of Gillespie prior to the 2025 Australian federal election, the National Party chose to nominate Alison Penfold, a former CEO of an Australian Live export industry group and former Senate candidate. Despite a 7.3% swing against the Nationals on the primary vote which became a 4.1% swing to the Labor Party on two party preferred, Penfold was easily elected in a 60% to 40% 2PP.

== Demographics ==
Lyne is a popular area for retirees. Lyne has the highest proportion of people aged 60 and over, the lowest proportions in their 20s and 30s, and the lowest proportion of infants. Lyne has the highest median age of 50.

== Members ==
| Image | Member | Party | Term | Notes |
|---|---|---|---|---|
| | Jim Eggins (1898–1952) | Country | 10 December 1949 – 28 January 1952 | Previously a member of the New South Wales Legislative Council. Died in office |
| | Philip Lucock (1916–1996) | Country | 22 March 1952 – 2 May 1975 | Served as Deputy Speaker of the House of Representatives 1961–1972, 1976–1977. Retired from politics ahead of the 1980 election. |
| | Philip Lucock (1916–1996) | National Country | 2 May 1975 – 19 September 1980 | Served as Deputy Speaker of the House of Representatives 1961–1972, 1976–1977. Retired from politics ahead of the 1980 election. |
| | Bruce Cowan (1926–2011) | National Country | 18 October 1980 – 16 October 1982 | Previously held the New South Wales Legislative Assembly seat of Oxley. Retired |
| | Bruce Cowan (1926–2011) | Nationals | 16 October 1982 – 8 February 1993 | Previously held the New South Wales Legislative Assembly seat of Oxley. Retired |
| | Mark Vaile (1956–) | Nationals | 13 March 1993 – 30 July 2008 | Served as minister and Deputy Prime Minister under Howard. Resigned to retire from politics. |
| | Rob Oakeshott (1969–) | Independent | 6 September 2008 – 5 August 2013 | Previously held the New South Wales Legislative Assembly seat of Port Macquarie. Retired |
| | David Gillespie (1957–) | Nationals | 7 September 2013 – 28 March 2025 | Served as minister under Morrison. Retired |
| | Alison Penfold (1971–) | Nationals | 3 May 2025 – present | Incumbent |

== Election results ==
2025 Australian federal election: Lyne
| Party | Candidate | Votes | % | ±% |
|---|---|---|---|---|
| National | Alison Penfold | 39,629 | 36.24 | −7.27 |
| Labor | Digby Wilson | 21,667 | 19.81 | −1.66 |
| Independent | Jeremy Miller | 16,943 | 15.49 | +15.49 |
| One Nation | Colin Hughes | 9,174 | 8.39 | +0.46 |
| Greens | Tom Ferrier | 6,977 | 6.38 | −1.47 |
| Legalise Cannabis | Keys Manley | 5,995 | 5.48 | +5.48 |
| Libertarian | Mark Hornshaw | 4,165 | 3.81 | −2.55 |
| Trumpet of Patriots | Cathy Charsley | 2,690 | 2.46 | +2.46 |
| Family First | David Masters | 1,662 | 1.52 | +1.52 |
| Citizens | Stephen Burke | 448 | 0.41 | +0.41 |
| Total formal votes | | 109,350 | 90.88 | −2.53 |
| Informal votes | | 10,979 | 9.12 | +2.53 |
| Turnout | | 120,329 | 92.86 | +2.30 |
Two-party-preferred result
| National | Alison Penfold | 65,369 | 59.78 | −4.02 |
| Labor | Digby Wilson | 43,981 | 40.22 | +4.02 |
| National hold | | Swing | −4.02 | |
