= 1952 West Virginia gubernatorial election =

- November 4, 1952
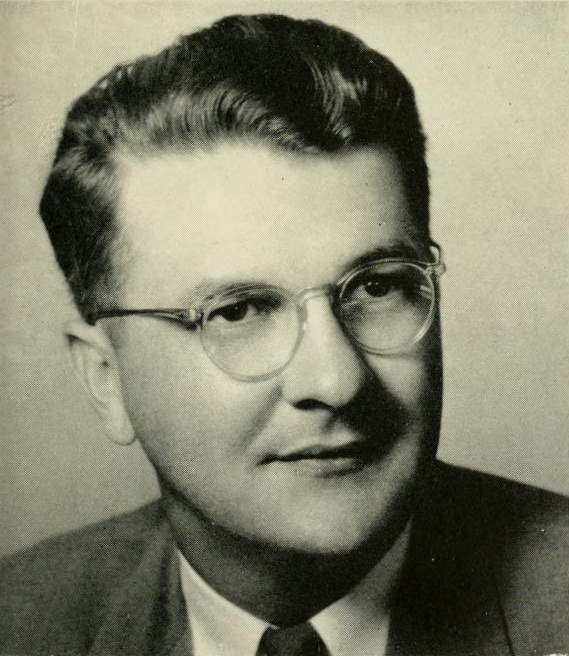

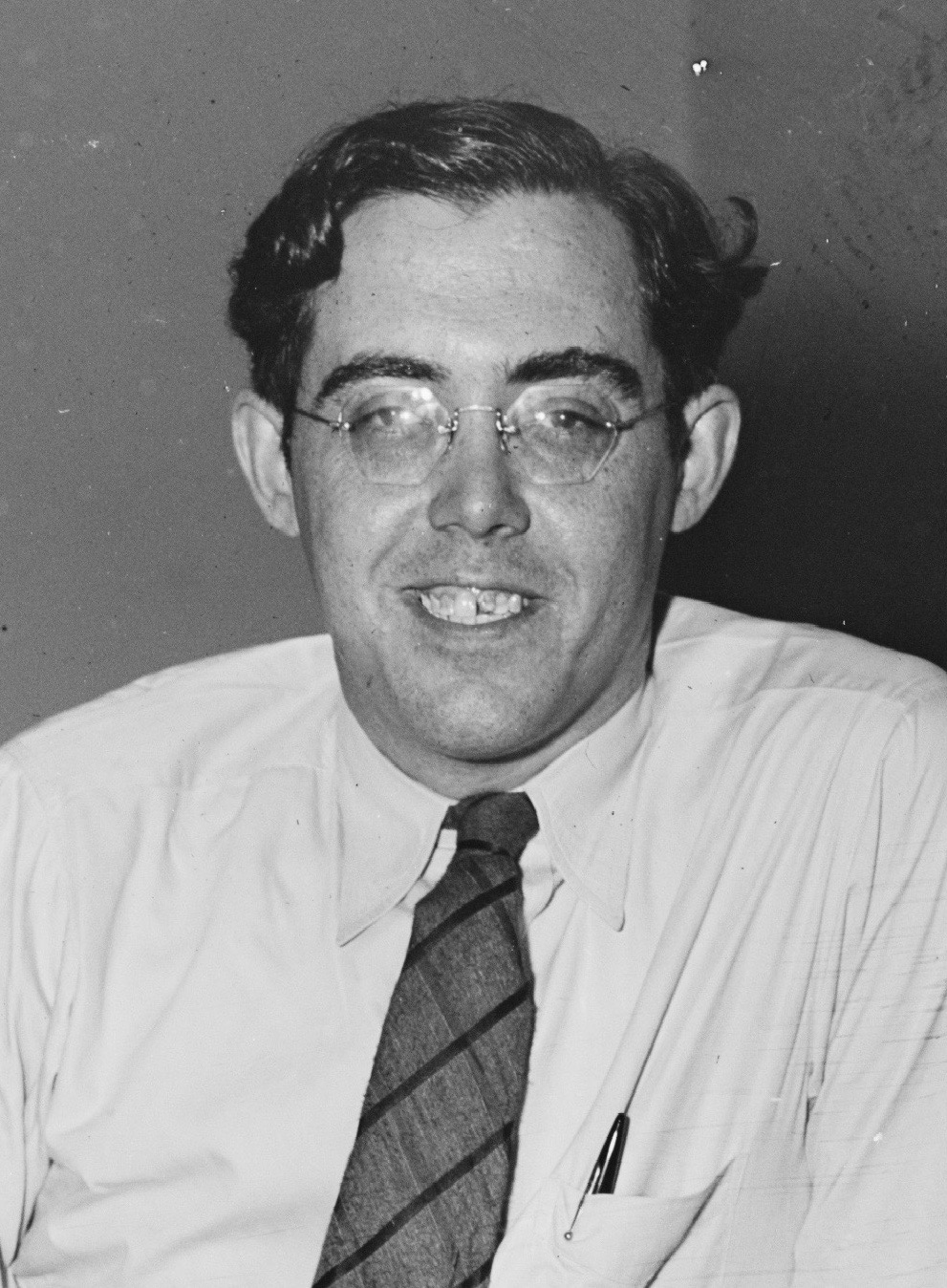
Nominee	William C. Marland	Rush Holt Sr.
Party	Democratic	Republican
Popular vote	454,898	427,629
Percentage	51.55%	48.46%
- County results Marland: 50–60% 60–70% Holt: 50–60% 60–70% 70–80% 80–90%
Governor before election
Okey L. Patteson
Democratic
Elected Governor
William C. Marland
Democratic

The 1952 West Virginia gubernatorial election took place on November 4, 1952, to elect the governor of West Virginia. E. H. Hedrick unsuccessfully ran for the Democratic nomination. This was Holt's last election campaign before he was stricken with cancer

== Results ==
1952 West Virginia gubernatorial election
Party	Candidate	Votes	%
Democratic	William C. Marland	454,898	51.55
Republican	Rush Holt Sr.	427,629	48.46
Total votes		882,527	100
Democratic hold			

=== Results by county ===
County	William Casey Marland Democratic		Rush D. Holt Republican		Margin		Total votes cast
County	#	%	#	%	#	%	Total votes cast
Barbour	4,394	48.17%	4,728	51.83%	-334	-3.66%	9,122
Berkeley	7,399	48.53%	7,846	51.47%	-447	-2.93%	15,245
Boone	8,100	64.76%	4,407	35.24%	3,693	29.53%	12,507
Braxton	4,128	52.74%	3,699	47.26%	429	5.48%	7,827
Brooke	7,781	60.76%	5,026	39.24%	2,755	21.51%	12,807
Cabell	22,965	45.94%	27,029	54.06%	-4,064	-8.13%	49,994
Calhoun	1,993	45.70%	2,368	54.30%	-375	-8.60%	4,361
Clay	2,661	48.74%	2,799	51.26%	-138	-2.53%	5,460
Doddridge	1,047	26.93%	2,841	73.07%	-1,794	-46.14%	3,888
Fayette	22,203	69.95%	9,536	30.05%	12,667	39.91%	31,739
Gilmer	2,274	54.97%	1,863	45.03%	411	9.93%	4,137
Grant	744	17.98%	3,393	82.02%	-2,649	-64.03%	4,137
Greenbrier	7,817	49.92%	7,843	50.08%	-26	-0.17%	15,660
Hampshire	2,551	51.08%	2,443	48.92%	108	2.16%	4,994
Hancock	9,660	58.45%	6,866	41.55%	2,794	16.91%	16,526
Hardy	2,497	55.65%	1,990	44.35%	507	11.30%	4,487
Harrison	20,066	47.85%	21,868	52.15%	-1,802	-4.30%	41,934
Jackson	2,628	34.96%	4,889	65.04%	-2,261	-30.08%	7,517
Jefferson	4,322	60.05%	2,875	39.95%	1,447	20.11%	7,197
Kanawha	53,308	47.78%	58,272	52.22%	-4,964	-4.45%	111,580
Lewis	2,810	28.25%	7,136	71.75%	-4,326	-43.49%	9,946
Lincoln	5,036	50.33%	4,970	49.67%	66	0.66%	10,006
Logan	19,474	68.07%	9,134	31.93%	10,340	36.14%	28,608
Marion	19,786	56.97%	14,942	43.03%	4,844	13.95%	34,728
Marshall	9,087	49.84%	9,145	50.16%	-58	-0.32%	18,232
Mason	3,867	38.51%	6,174	61.49%	-2,307	-22.98%	10,041
McDowell	24,526	69.13%	10,953	30.87%	13,573	38.26%	35,479
Mercer	17,318	55.55%	13,857	44.45%	3,461	11.10%	31,175
Mineral	4,736	46.23%	5,508	53.77%	-772	-7.54%	10,244
Mingo	13,178	66.05%	6,775	33.95%	6,403	32.09%	19,953
Monongalia	13,290	50.27%	13,147	49.73%	143	0.54%	26,437
Monroe	2,879	45.20%	3,490	54.80%	-611	-9.59%	6,369
Morgan	1,262	30.91%	2,821	69.09%	-1,559	-38.18%	4,083
Nicholas	5,457	53.71%	4,703	46.29%	754	7.42%	10,160
Ohio	18,009	48.24%	19,326	51.76%	-1,317	-3.53%	37,335
Pendleton	1,957	47.56%	2,158	52.44%	-201	-4.88%	4,115
Pleasants	1,705	47.48%	1,886	52.52%	-181	-5.04%	3,591
Pocahontas	2,714	48.21%	2,916	51.79%	-202	-3.59%	5,630
Preston	4,403	35.39%	8,037	64.61%	-3,634	-29.21%	12,440
Putnam	4,624	47.27%	5,159	52.73%	-535	-5.47%	9,783
Raleigh	21,747	58.68%	15,312	41.32%	6,435	17.36%	37,059
Randolph	6,872	54.05%	5,841	45.95%	1,031	8.11%	12,713
Ritchie	1,762	29.13%	4,286	70.87%	-2,524	-41.73%	6,048
Roane	3,558	41.70%	4,974	58.30%	-1,416	-16.60%	8,532
Summers	4,203	52.49%	3,805	47.51%	398	4.97%	8,008
Taylor	3,807	44.92%	4,668	55.08%	-861	-10.16%	8,475
Tucker	2,455	50.39%	2,417	49.61%	38	0.78%	4,872
Tyler	1,568	30.99%	3,491	69.01%	-1,923	-38.01%	5,059
Upshur	2,423	28.69%	6,023	71.31%	-3,600	-42.62%	8,446
Wayne	8,756	54.74%	7,241	45.26%	1,515	9.47%	15,997
Webster	3,619	59.15%	2,499	40.85%	1,120	18.31%	6,118
Wetzel	4,530	49.64%	4,595	50.36%	-65	-0.71%	9,125
Wirt	1,090	42.05%	1,502	57.95%	-412	-15.90%	2,592
Wood	14,790	42.62%	19,913	57.38%	-5,123	-14.76%	34,703
Wyoming	9,062	59.21%	6,244	40.79%	2,818	18.41%	15,306
Totals	454,898	51.54%	427,629	48.46%	27,269	3.09%	882,527
