= 1952 Lyne by-election =

The 1952 by-election for the Australian House of Representatives seat of Lyne was called on 22 March after the death of the incumbent Country Party of Australia member Jim Eggins who died in office on 28 January.

== Candidates ==
Contesting the seat for the Country Party were Donald Lancaster and Philip Lucock, who had stood as one of multiple Country Party candidates for the seat at the 1949 election.

Their main opponent was Edward Hayes of the Australian Labor Party. He had been the Labor candidate at several previous polls.

Two independents, Edward Spensley and Joe Cordner, also stood for the seat.

== Results ==
1952 Lyne by-election
Party	Candidate	Votes	%	±%
Labor	Edward Hayes	13,588	37.3	+7.4
Country	Philip Lucock	10,994	30.2	−3.1
Country	Donald Lancaster	10,631	29.2	−3.1
Independent Liberal	Edward Spensley	775	2.1	+2.1
Independent	Joe Cordner	421	1.2	−3.4
Total formal votes		36,409	98.5	
Informal votes		565	1.5	
Turnout		36,974	92.1	
Two-party-preferred result
Country	Philip Lucock	21,484	59.0	−9.8
Labor	Edward Hayes	14,925	41.0	+9.8
Country hold		Swing	−9.8	

The presence of two Country Party candidates split the vote and Hayes took three thousand votes more than either Lucock or Lancaster, but with preferences from Lancaster, Lucock easily won the seat.

== Aftermath ==
When Philip Lucock was sworn in as the member for Lyne on 22 March 1952, he became the first member of the House of Representatives to swear allegiance to Queen Elizabeth II who had ascended to the throne on 6 February.

At the following Federal election in 1954 Lancaster stood as an independent candidate against his former Country Party colleague.

== See also ==
- List of Australian federal by-elections
