= 1952 Utah gubernatorial election =

- November 4, 1952
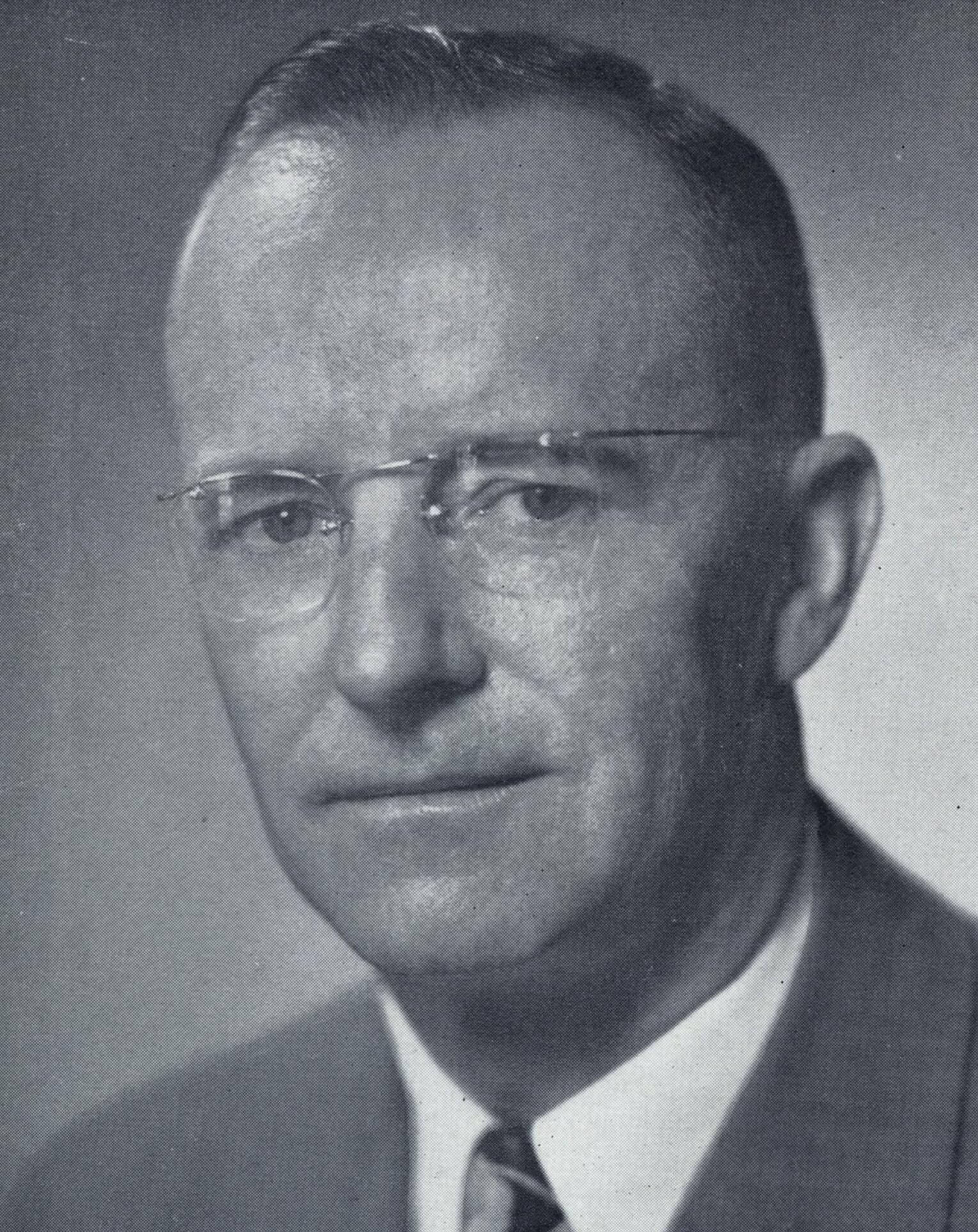

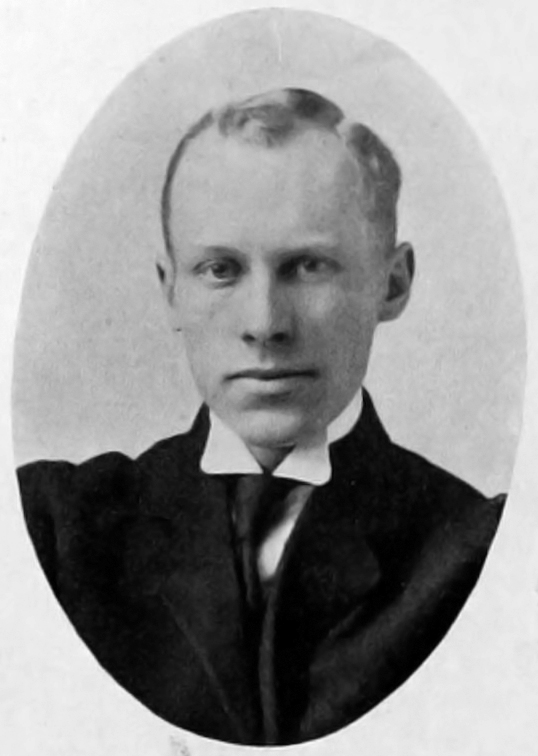
Nominee	J. Bracken Lee	Earl J. Glade
Party	Republican	Democratic
Popular vote	180,516	147,188
Percentage	55.09%	44.91%
- County results Lee: 50–60% 60–70% 70–80% 80–90% Glade: 50–60%
Governor before election
J. Bracken Lee
Republican
Elected Governor
J. Bracken Lee
Republican

The 1952 Utah gubernatorial election was held on November 4, 1952. Incumbent Republican J. Bracken Lee defeated the Democratic nominee, mayor of Salt Lake City Earl J. Glade, with 55.09% of the vote.

== Primary election ==
Primary elections were held on September 9, 1952.

=== Republican primary ===
==== Candidates ====
- A. Cyril Callister
- J. Bracken Lee, incumbent governor

==== Results ====
Republican primary results
Party	Candidate	Votes	%
Republican	J. Bracken Lee (inc.)	69,583	82.71%
Republican	A. Cyril Callister	15,545	17.29%
Total votes		84,128	100.00%

=== Democratic primary ===
==== Candidates ====
- Heber Bennion Jr., Secretary of State of Utah
- Earl J. Glade, Mayor of Salt Lake City

==== Results ====
Democratic primary results
Party	Candidate	Votes	%
Democratic	Earl J. Glade	36,415	52.48%
Democratic	Heber Bennion Jr.	32,970	47.52%
Total votes		69,385	100.00%

== General election ==
=== Candidates ===
- J. Bracken Lee, Republican
- Earl J. Glade, Democratic

=== Results ===
1952 Utah gubernatorial election
Party	Candidate	Votes	%	±%
Republican	J. Bracken Lee (incumbent)	180,516	55.09%	+0.10%
Democratic	Earl J. Glade	147,188	44.91%	−0.10%
Total votes		327,704	100.00%	
Majority		33,328	10.17%	
Republican hold		Swing	+0.19%	

=== Results by county ===
County	J. Bracken Lee Republican		Earl J. Glade Democratic		Margin		Total votes cast
County	#	%	#	%	#	%	Total votes cast
Beaver	1,286	55.70%	1,023	44.30%	263	11.39%	2,309
Box Elder	4,936	56.12%	3,859	43.88%	1,077	12.25%	8,795
Cache	8,767	61.15%	5,571	38.85%	3,196	22.29%	14,338
Carbon	4,586	48.10%	4,948	51.90%	-362	-3.80%	9,534
Daggett	72	41.62%	101	58.38%	-29	-16.76%	173
Davis	8,034	53.74%	6,916	46.26%	1,118	7.48%	14,950
Duchesne	1,673	52.28%	1,527	47.72%	146	4.56%	3,200
Emery	1,587	58.15%	1,142	41.85%	445	16.31%	2,729
Garfield	932	60.92%	598	39.08%	334	21.83%	1,530
Grand	665	71.28%	268	28.72%	397	42.55%	933
Iron	3,003	63.88%	1,698	36.12%	1,305	27.76%	4,701
Juab	1,535	52.77%	1,374	47.23%	161	5.53%	2,909
Kane	896	81.16%	208	18.84%	688	62.32%	1,104
Millard	2,623	61.31%	1,655	38.69%	968	22.63%	4,278
Morgan	678	51.52%	638	48.48%	40	3.04%	1,316
Piute	462	62.52%	277	37.48%	185	25.03%	739
Rich	530	65.27%	282	34.73%	248	30.84%	812
Salt Lake	81,946	57.42%	60,779	42.58%	21,167	14.83%	142,725
San Juan	657	50.38%	647	49.62%	10	0.77%	1,304
Sanpete	3,684	59.00%	2,560	41.00%	1,124	18.00%	6,244
Sevier	3,831	70.55%	1,599	29.45%	2,232	41.10%	5,430
Summit	1,847	57.50%	1,365	42.50%	482	15.01%	3,212
Tooele	3,241	48.51%	3,440	51.49%	-199	-2.98%	6,681
Uintah	2,342	60.86%	1,506	39.14%	836	21.73%	3,848
Utah	18,670	51.45%	17,620	48.55%	1,050	2.89%	36,290
Wasatch	1,403	53.29%	1,230	46.71%	173	6.57%	2,633
Washington	2,496	62.31%	1,510	37.69%	986	24.61%	4,006
Wayne	449	55.85%	355	44.15%	94	11.69%	804
Weber	17,685	44.02%	22,492	55.98%	-4,807	-11.96%	40,177
Total	180,516	55.09%	147,188	44.91%	33,328	10.17%	327,704

==== Counties that flipped from Democratic to Republican ====
- Sanpete
- Uintah
- Wayne

==== Counties that flipped from Republican to Democratic ====
- Carbon
- Tooele
- Weber
