= 1952 Werriwa by-election =

← 1951	29 November 1952	1954 →

Division of Werriwa (NSW) in the House of Representatives
- Turnout: 88.5% (▼7.1)
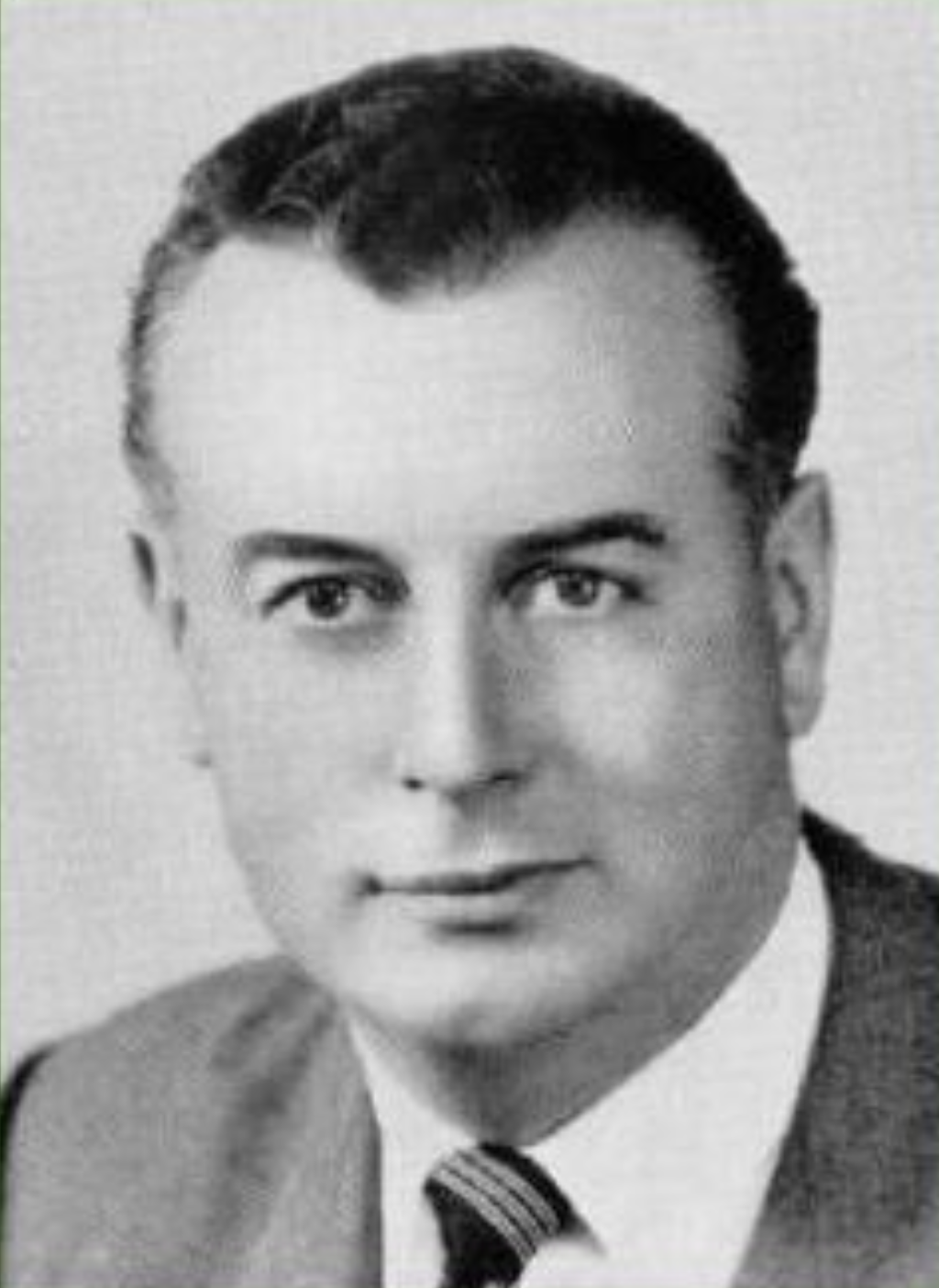

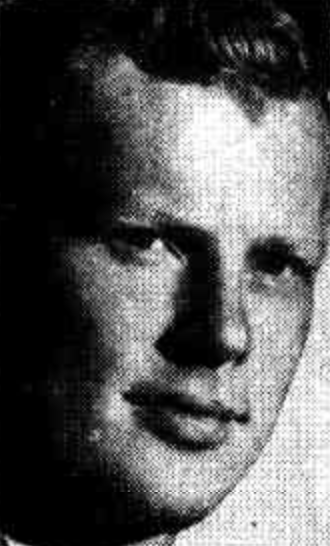
	First party	Second party
Candidate	Gough Whitlam	Ian Griffith
Party	Labor	Liberal
Primary vote	32,561	15,706
Percentage	67.5%	32.5%
Swing	▲12.4	▼12.4
MP before election
Bert Lazzarini
Labor
Elected MP
Gough Whitlam
Labor

A by-election was held for the Australian House of Representatives seat of Werriwa on 29 November 1952. This was triggered by the death of Labor Party MP Bert Lazzarini.

The by-election was won by Labor candidate and future prime minister Gough Whitlam.

== Results ==
1952 Werriwa by-election
Party	Candidate	Votes	%	±%
Labor	Gough Whitlam	32,561	67.5	+12.4
Liberal	Ian Griffith	15,706	32.5	−12.4
Total formal votes		48,267	98.3	+0.6
Informal votes		826	1.7	−0.6
Turnout		49,093	88.5	−7.1
Labor hold		Swing	+12.4	

== See also ==
- List of Australian federal by-elections
