= 1952 Kansas gubernatorial election =

- November 4, 1952
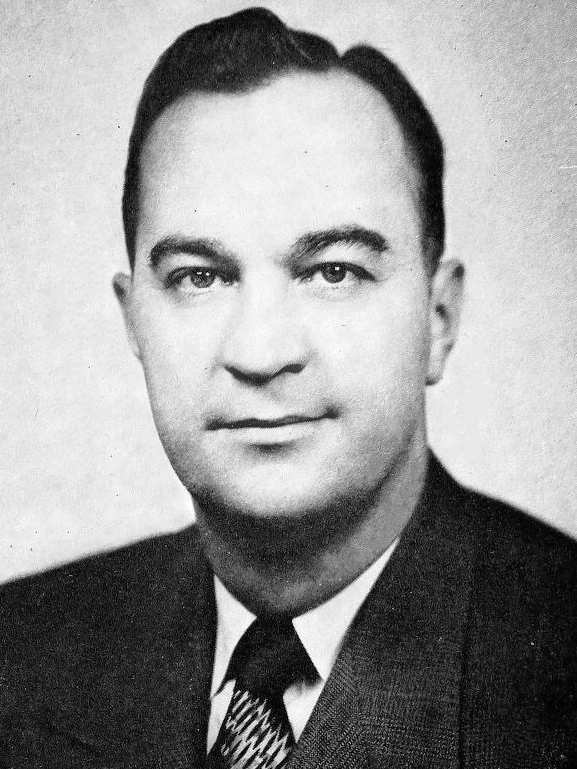

Nominee	Edward F. Arn	Charles Rooney
Party	Republican	Democratic
Popular vote	491,338	363,482
Percentage	56.34%	41.68%
- County results Arn: 40–50% 50–60% 60–70% Rooney: 40–50% 50–60%
Governor before election
Edward F. Arn
Republican
Elected Governor
Edward F. Arn
Republican

The 1952 Kansas gubernatorial election was held on November 4, 1952. Incumbent Republican Edward F. Arn defeated Democratic nominee Charles Rooney with 56.34% of the vote.

== Primary elections ==
Primary elections were held on August 5, 1952.

=== Democratic primary ===
==== Candidates ====
- Charles Rooney
- Robert G. Martin
- David S. Downing
- Henry D. Parkinson
- Ewell Stewart

==== Results ====
Democratic primary results
Party	Candidate	Votes	%
Democratic	Charles Rooney	35,967	33.21
Democratic	Robert G. Martin	23,021	21.25
Democratic	David S. Downing	22,319	20.61
Democratic	Henry D. Parkinson	20,314	18.75
Democratic	Ewell Stewart	6,698	6.18
Total votes		108,319	100.00

== General election ==
=== Candidates ===
Major party candidates

- Edward F. Arn, Republican
- Charles Rooney, Democratic

Other candidates

- David C. White, Prohibition
- W. W. Tamplin, Socialist

=== Results ===
1952 Kansas gubernatorial election
Party	Candidate	Votes	%	±%
Republican	Edward F. Arn (incumbent)	491,338	56.34%	
Democratic	Charles Rooney	363,482	41.68%	
Prohibition	David C. White	15,369	1.76%	
Socialist	W. W. Tamplin	1,950	0.22%	
Majority		127,856		
Turnout		872,139		
Republican hold		Swing		
