= List of elections in 1955 =

The following elections occurred in the year 1955.

== Africa ==
- 1955 Liberian general election
- 1955 Liberian constitutional referendum
- 1955 South-West African legislative election

== Asia ==
- 1955 Cambodian parliamentary election
- 1955 Indonesian Constituent Assembly election
- 1955 Indonesian legislative election
- 1955 Israeli legislative election
- 1955 Israeli municipal elections
- 1955 Japanese general election
- 1955 Laotian parliamentary election
- 1955 Malayan general election
- 1955 Malayan local elections
- 1955 Pakistani Constituent Assembly election
- 1955 Philippine Senate election
- 1955 Singaporean general election
- 1955 Soviet Union regional elections
- 1955 State of Vietnam referendum
- 1955 Syrian presidential election

== Europe ==
- 1955 Andorran parliamentary election
- 1955 Irish local elections
- 1955 Italian presidential election
- 1955 Maltese general election
- 1955 Monegasque general election
- 1955 Soviet Union regional elections
- 1955 Norwegian local elections
- 1955 San Marino general election
- 1955 Swedish driving side referendum
- 1955 Swiss federal election

=== Germany ===
- 1955 Rhineland-Palatinate state election

=== United Kingdom ===
- 1955 United Kingdom general election
  - England: 1955 United Kingdom general election in England
  - Northern Ireland: 1955 United Kingdom general election in Northern Ireland
  - Scotland: 1955 United Kingdom general election in Scotland
  - Wales: 1955 United Kingdom general election in Wales
  - List of MPs elected in the 1955 United Kingdom general election
- 1955 Labour Party leadership election
- 1955 Edinburgh North by-election
- 1955 Gateshead West by-election
- 1955 Greenock by-election
- 1955 Mid Ulster by-election
- 1955 Orpington by-election
- 1955 South Norfolk by-election
- 1955 Stockport South by-election
- 1955 Twickenham by-election
- 1955 Wrexham by-election
- 1955 United Kingdom local elections

== North America ==
=== Canada ===
- 1955 Alberta general election
- 1955 Edmonton municipal election
- 1955 Ontario general election
- 1955 Prince Edward Island general election
- 1955 Toronto municipal election
- 1955 Yukon general election

=== Mexico ===
- 1955 Mexican legislative election

=== United States ===
==== United States gubernatorial ====
- 1955 Kentucky gubernatorial election
- 1955 Mississippi gubernatorial election
- 1955 United States gubernatorial elections

==== United States House of Representatives ====
- 1955 United States House of Representatives elections

==== United States mayoral elections ====
- 1955 Baltimore mayoral election
- 1955 Chicago mayoral election
- 1955 Cleveland mayoral election
- 1955 Evansville mayoral election
- 1955 Manchester, New Hampshire mayoral election
- 1955 Philadelphia mayoral election
- 1955 San Diego mayoral election
- 1955 San Francisco mayoral election
- 1955 Springfield mayoral election
- 1955 Tampa mayoral election

== Australia ==
- 1955 Australian federal election
- 1955 Bulli state by-election
- 1955 Clarence state by-election
- 1955 Cook by-election
- 1955 Flinders state by-election
- 1955 Tasmanian state election
- 1955 Victorian state election

== South America ==
- 1955 Brazilian presidential election
