= 1955 United States elections =

- ← 1953 1954 1955 1956 1957 → Off-year elections

Elections in 1955 included:

- Congressional elections
  - 1955 Florida's 6th congressional district special election
  - 1955 Michigan's 15th congressional district special election
- Gubernatorial elections
  - 1955 Kentucky gubernatorial election - Happy Chandler, the Democratic Party candidate was elected with 451,647 votes or 58.02%, to Republican Edwin R. Denney with 322,671 votes or 41.45%, with minor party candidates receiving the remainder, out of 778,488 votes. It was a hold for the Democrats.
  - 1955 Mississippi gubernatorial election
- State Senate elections
  - 1955 New Jersey Senate election
- Mayoral elections
  - 1955 Baltimore mayoral election
  - 1955 Boston mayoral election
  - 1955 Chicago mayoral election
  - 1955 Cleveland mayoral election
  - 1955 Evansville, Indiana, mayoral election
  - 1955 Indianapolis mayoral election
  - 1955 Manchester, New Hampshire, mayoral election
  - 1955 Philadelphia mayoral election
  - 1955 San Diego mayoral election
  - 1955 San Francisco mayoral election
  - 1955 Springfield, Massachusetts mayoral election
- Municipal elections
  - 1955 Philadelphia municipal election
  - 1955 Philadelphia City Council election

== See also ==
- 1955 United States House of Representatives elections
- 1955 United States gubernatorial elections
