= 1960 United States presidential election in Virginia =

- November 8, 1960

Nominee	Richard Nixon	John F. Kennedy
Party	Republican	Democratic
Home state	California	Massachusetts
Running mate	Henry Cabot Lodge Jr.	Lyndon B. Johnson
Electoral vote	12	0
Popular vote	404,521	362,327
Percentage	52.44%	46.97%

Nixon
40–50%
50–60%
60–70%
70–80%
80–90%
90–100%
Kennedy
40–50%
50–60%
60–70%
70–80%
80–90%
90–100%
Other
Tie
President before election
Dwight D. Eisenhower
Republican
Elected President
John F. Kennedy
Democratic

The 1960 United States presidential election in Virginia took place on November 8, 1960. Voters chose 12 representatives, or electors to the Electoral College, who voted for president and vice president.

The Republican ticket of then-Vice President Richard Nixon of California and running mate Henry Cabot Lodge Jr. comfortably carried Virginia over the Democratic ticket of U.S. Senator John F. Kennedy of Massachusetts and Lyndon B. Johnson, even while Kennedy narrowly prevailed nationally. In the process, Kennedy became the first Democrat to ever win the presidency without carrying the state, and one of only three Democrats to do so. (Note: Kennedy, Jimmy Carter, and Bill Clinton are the only three Democrats to have won the presidency without carrying Virginia.)

For six decades Virginia had almost completely disenfranchised its black and poor white populations through the use of a cumulative poll tax and literacy tests. So restricted was suffrage in this period that it has been calculated that a third of Virginia's electorate during the first half of the twentieth century comprised state employees and officeholders.

This limited electorate allowed Virginian politics to be controlled for four decades by the Byrd Organization, as progressive “antiorganization” factions were rendered impotent by the inability of almost all their potential electorate to vote. Historical fusion with the “Readjuster” Democrats, defection of substantial proportions of the Northeast-aligned white electorate of the Shenandoah Valley and Southwest Virginia over free silver, and an early move towards a “lily white” Jim Crow party meant Republicans retained a small but permanent number of legislative seats and local offices in the western part of the state.

In 1928, the GOP did carry the state's presidential electoral votes due to anti-Catholicism against Al Smith in the Chesapeake Bay region and increased middle-class Republicanism in the cities, but it was 1952 before any real changes occurred, as in-migration from the traditionally Republican Northeast meant that growing Washington, D.C., and Richmond suburbs would turn Republican not just in presidential elections but also in Congressional ones, although the Republicans would not make significant gains in the state legislature. Opposition to the black civil rights legislation of Harry S. Truman meant that the Byrd Organization did not support Adlai Stevenson II, with the result that Dwight D. Eisenhower carried the state aided by defections of the Southside Thurmond vote from 1948. In 1956, Eisenhower repeated his win despite losing his Southside support due to the President's opposition to Byrd's “Massive Resistance” policy following Brown v. Board of Education, as continuing Northern in-migration and a rapid swing to him of the modest but growing number of black voters allowed him to maintain his margin.

In the following years, continuing “Massive Resistance” weakened the GOP in Virginia, as they could not develop a consistent or coherent response: Ted Dalton, who had received 45 percent of the vote in 1953 running against the Byrd Organization, won only 36 percent as his policy of “token integration” was drowned out by the state Democrats.

Although Byrd again refused to endorse Democratic nominee, Senator John F. Kennedy, his former ally before the end of “Massive Resistance”, Governor J. Lindsay Almond, strongly endorsed the Massachusetts Senator against the Republican nominee, incumbent Vice President Richard Nixon.

== Predictions ==
Source	Ranking	As of
The Philadelphia Inquirer	Tilt R	October 3, 1960
Knoxville News Sentinel	Likely R	October 23, 1960
Daily News	Likely R	October 28, 1960
The Daily Item	Likely R	November 4, 1960
Hattiesburg American	Likely R	November 7, 1960

== Results ==
1960 United States presidential election in Virginia
Party	Candidate	Votes	Percentage	Electoral votes
Republican	Richard Nixon	404,521	52.44%	12
Democratic	John F. Kennedy	362,327	46.97%	0
Virginia Conservative	C. Benton Coiner	4,204	0.54%	0
Socialist Labor	Eric Hass	397	0.05%	0
Totals		771,449	100.00%	12

=== Results by county or independent city ===
County or city	Richard Nixon Republican		John F. Kennedy Democratic		C. Benton Coiner Virginia Conservative		Eric Hass Socialist Labor		Margin		Total votes cast
County or city	#	%	#	%	#	%	#	%	#	%	Total votes cast
Accomack	2,676	47.95%	2,884	51.68%	20	0.36%	1	0.02%	-208	-3.73%	5,581
Albemarle	3,135	59.47%	2,102	39.87%	34	0.64%	1	0.02%	1,033	19.60%	5,272
Alexandria	8,826	47.58%	9,662	52.08%	63	0.34%	57	0.31%	836	4.50%	18,608
Alleghany	1,214	48.79%	1,265	50.84%	8	0.32%	1	0.04%	-51	-2.05%	2,488
Amelia	784	51.44%	708	46.46%	31	2.03%	1	0.07%	76	4.98%	1,524
Amherst	1,455	38.83%	2,280	60.85%	10	0.27%	2	0.05%	-825	-22.02%	3,747
Appomattox	951	43.07%	1,240	56.16%	14	0.63%	3	0.14%	-289	-13.09%	2,208
Arlington	23,632	51.40%	22,095	48.06%	225	0.49%	25	0.05%	1,537	3.34%	45,977
Augusta	4,034	67.36%	1,914	31.96%	40	0.67%	1	0.02%	2,120	35.40%	5,989
Bath	646	50.59%	629	49.26%	1	0.08%	1	0.08%	17	1.33%	1,277
Bedford	2,911	47.87%	3,150	51.80%	17	0.28%	3	0.05%	-239	-3.93%	6,081
Bland	848	50.75%	822	49.19%	1	0.06%	0	0.00%	26	1.56%	1,671
Botetourt	2,159	56.79%	1,621	42.64%	22	0.58%	0	0.00%	538	14.15%	3,802
Bristol	1,728	52.38%	1,561	47.32%	9	0.27%	1	0.03%	167	5.06%	3,299
Brunswick	926	31.58%	1,942	66.23%	63	2.15%	1	0.03%	-1,016	-34.65%	2,932
Buchanan	2,370	38.86%	3,706	60.76%	18	0.30%	5	0.08%	-1,336	-21.90%	6,099
Buckingham	765	44.37%	947	54.93%	11	0.64%	1	0.06%	-182	-10.56%	1,724
Buena Vista	487	53.05%	427	46.51%	4	0.44%	0	0.00%	60	6.54%	918
Campbell	2,903	48.63%	3,030	50.75%	37	0.62%	0	0.00%	-127	-2.12%	5,970
Caroline	864	36.50%	1,483	62.65%	19	0.80%	1	0.04%	-619	-26.15%	2,367
Carroll	3,705	66.29%	1,873	33.51%	9	0.16%	2	0.04%	1,832	32.78%	5,589
Charles City	337	34.96%	623	64.63%	3	0.31%	1	0.10%	-286	-29.67%	964
Charlotte	867	32.90%	1,735	65.84%	26	0.99%	7	0.27%	-868	-32.94%	2,635
Charlottesville	3,651	55.08%	2,894	43.66%	72	1.09%	11	0.17%	757	11.42%	6,628
Chesterfield	9,787	61.71%	5,982	37.72%	87	0.55%	3	0.02%	3,805	23.99%	15,859
Clarke	804	46.31%	923	53.17%	9	0.52%	0	0.00%	-119	-6.86%	1,736
Clifton Forge	885	53.22%	771	46.36%	4	0.24%	3	0.18%	114	6.86%	1,663
Colonial Heights	1,372	53.16%	1,198	46.42%	10	0.39%	1	0.04%	174	6.74%	2,581
Covington	1,436	47.85%	1,558	51.92%	6	0.20%	1	0.03%	-122	-4.07%	3,001
Craig	433	44.78%	534	55.22%	0	0.00%	0	0.00%	-101	-10.44%	967
Culpeper	1,630	54.86%	1,332	44.83%	8	0.27%	1	0.03%	298	10.03%	2,971
Cumberland	691	54.75%	559	44.29%	12	0.95%	0	0.00%	132	10.46%	1,262
Danville	4,966	63.72%	2,611	33.50%	188	2.41%	29	0.37%	2,355	30.22%	7,794
Dickenson	2,203	44.42%	2,756	55.56%	1	0.02%	0	0.00%	-553	-11.14%	4,960
Dinwiddie	935	34.81%	1,714	63.81%	36	1.34%	1	0.04%	-779	-29.00%	2,686
Essex	606	54.25%	509	45.57%	1	0.09%	1	0.09%	97	8.68%	1,117
Fairfax	28,006	51.65%	26,064	48.07%	124	0.23%	25	0.05%	1,942	3.58%	54,219
Falls Church	1,525	48.18%	1,629	51.47%	7	0.22%	4	0.13%	-104	-3.29%	3,165
Fauquier	2,123	51.86%	1,958	47.83%	13	0.32%	0	0.00%	165	4.03%	4,094
Floyd	1,933	70.06%	817	29.61%	4	0.14%	5	0.18%	1,116	40.45%	2,759
Fluvanna	763	54.89%	614	44.17%	13	0.94%	0	0.00%	149	10.72%	1,390
Franklin	2,080	41.47%	2,924	58.29%	9	0.18%	3	0.06%	-844	-16.82%	5,016
Frederick	2,061	53.74%	1,757	45.81%	14	0.37%	3	0.08%	304	7.93%	3,835
Fredericksburg	1,566	53.72%	1,326	45.49%	22	0.75%	1	0.03%	240	8.23%	2,915
Galax	867	62.96%	508	36.89%	1	0.07%	1	0.07%	359	26.07%	1,377
Giles	2,030	46.91%	2,214	51.17%	78	1.80%	5	0.12%	-184	-4.26%	4,327
Gloucester	1,310	50.00%	1,297	49.50%	10	0.38%	3	0.11%	13	0.50%	2,620
Goochland	851	48.66%	862	49.29%	33	1.89%	3	0.17%	-11	-0.63%	1,749
Grayson	3,893	58.65%	2,738	41.25%	4	0.06%	3	0.05%	1,155	17.40%	6,638
Greene	573	64.24%	314	35.20%	5	0.56%	0	0.00%	259	29.04%	892
Greensville	1,057	38.21%	1,676	60.59%	31	1.12%	2	0.07%	-619	-22.38%	2,766
Halifax	1,784	39.57%	2,676	59.36%	44	0.98%	4	0.09%	-892	-19.79%	4,508
Hampton	7,623	51.48%	7,133	48.17%	43	0.29%	9	0.06%	490	3.31%	14,808
Hanover	3,020	59.39%	2,023	39.78%	39	0.77%	3	0.06%	997	19.61%	5,085
Harrisonburg	2,172	72.04%	836	27.73%	7	0.23%	0	0.00%	1,336	44.31%	3,015
Henrico	19,446	66.52%	9,626	32.93%	152	0.52%	11	0.04%	9,820	33.59%	29,235
Henry	2,323	41.17%	3,306	58.59%	12	0.21%	2	0.04%	-983	-17.42%	5,643
Highland	527	56.55%	401	43.03%	3	0.32%	1	0.11%	126	13.52%	932
Hopewell	2,169	54.24%	1,805	45.14%	21	0.53%	4	0.10%	364	9.10%	3,999
Isle of Wight	1,141	35.91%	2,020	63.58%	13	0.41%	3	0.09%	-879	-27.67%	3,177
James City	873	50.49%	845	48.87%	9	0.52%	2	0.12%	28	1.62%	1,729
King and Queen	432	43.95%	536	54.53%	14	1.42%	1	0.10%	-104	-10.58%	983
King George	685	48.58%	717	50.85%	8	0.57%	0	0.00%	-32	-2.27%	1,410
King William	793	51.19%	745	48.10%	10	0.65%	1	0.06%	48	3.09%	1,549
Lancaster	1,340	59.56%	895	39.78%	14	0.62%	1	0.04%	445	19.78%	2,250
Lee	3,363	46.29%	3,867	53.23%	24	0.33%	11	0.15%	-504	-6.94%	7,265
Loudoun	2,526	50.99%	2,399	48.43%	28	0.57%	1	0.02%	127	2.56%	4,954
Louisa	1,170	47.60%	1,244	50.61%	39	1.59%	5	0.20%	-74	-3.01%	2,458
Lunenburg	838	35.22%	1,451	60.99%	90	3.78%	0	0.00%	-613	-25.77%	2,379
Lynchburg	7,271	59.33%	4,961	40.48%	23	0.19%	1	0.01%	2,310	18.85%	12,256
Madison	998	60.38%	636	38.48%	19	1.15%	0	0.00%	362	21.90%	1,653
Martinsville	1,729	49.16%	1,699	48.31%	84	2.39%	5	0.14%	30	0.85%	3,517
Mathews	1,069	60.95%	682	38.88%	3	0.17%	0	0.00%	387	22.07%	1,754
Mecklenburg	1,936	42.70%	2,533	55.87%	64	1.41%	1	0.02%	-597	-13.17%	4,534
Middlesex	823	58.70%	574	40.94%	5	0.36%	0	0.00%	249	17.76%	1,402
Montgomery	4,270	66.25%	2,157	33.47%	17	0.26%	1	0.02%	2,113	32.78%	6,445
Nansemond	1,346	25.29%	3,944	74.09%	24	0.45%	9	0.17%	-2,598	-48.80%	5,323
Nelson	775	34.17%	1,480	65.26%	13	0.57%	0	0.00%	-705	-31.09%	2,268
New Kent	526	51.67%	481	47.25%	10	0.98%	1	0.10%	45	4.42%	1,018
Newport News	10,098	53.56%	8,678	46.02%	75	0.40%	4	0.02%	1,420	7.54%	18,855
Norfolk	3,769	42.18%	5,101	57.08%	65	0.73%	1	0.01%	-1,332	-14.90%	8,936
Norfolk City	17,174	43.51%	22,037	55.83%	248	0.63%	14	0.04%	-4,863	-12.32%	39,473
Northampton	995	41.60%	1,387	57.98%	9	0.38%	1	0.04%	-392	-16.38%	2,392
Northumberland	1,340	60.61%	858	38.81%	11	0.50%	2	0.09%	482	21.80%	2,211
Norton	549	51.02%	526	48.88%	1	0.09%	0	0.00%	23	2.14%	1,076
Nottoway	1,319	40.14%	1,882	57.27%	84	2.56%	1	0.03%	-563	-17.13%	3,286
Orange	1,413	54.28%	1,108	42.57%	78	3.00%	4	0.15%	305	11.71%	2,603
Page	2,708	62.53%	1,608	37.13%	10	0.23%	5	0.12%	1,100	25.40%	4,331
Patrick	1,362	44.98%	1,655	54.66%	9	0.30%	2	0.07%	-293	-9.68%	3,028
Petersburg	2,820	48.60%	2,950	50.84%	32	0.55%	1	0.02%	-130	-2.24%	5,803
Pittsylvania	3,788	47.62%	4,089	51.41%	67	0.84%	10	0.13%	-301	-3.79%	7,954
Portsmouth	6,900	40.64%	9,902	58.32%	165	0.97%	13	0.08%	-3,002	-17.68%	16,980
Powhatan	779	58.66%	528	39.76%	19	1.43%	2	0.15%	251	18.90%	1,328
Prince Edward	1,721	53.55%	1,459	45.40%	31	0.96%	3	0.09%	262	8.15%	3,214
Prince George	727	42.14%	983	56.99%	13	0.75%	2	0.12%	-256	-14.85%	1,725
Princess Anne	4,844	44.67%	5,954	54.91%	23	0.41%	5	0.09%	-1,110	-10.24%	10,843
Prince William	2,624	46.53%	2,987	52.97%	39	0.36%	6	0.06%	-363	-6.44%	5,639
Pulaski	3,059	58.75%	2,104	40.41%	44	0.85%	0	0.00%	955	18.34%	5,207
Radford	1,663	57.11%	1,240	42.58%	9	0.31%	0	0.00%	423	14.53%	2,912
Rappahannock	426	43.69%	544	55.79%	3	0.31%	2	0.21%	-118	-12.10%	975
Richmond	801	64.96%	425	34.47%	6	0.49%	1	0.08%	376	30.49%	1,233
Richmond City	27,307	60.41%	17,642	39.03%	245	0.54%	11	0.02%	9,665	21.38%	45,205
Roanoke	9,109	67.31%	4,384	32.40%	36	0.27%	3	0.02%	4,725	34.91%	13,532
Roanoke City	15,229	62.28%	9,175	37.52%	36	0.27%	3	0.02%	6,054	24.76%	24,453
Rockbridge	2,170	60.53%	1,405	39.19%	10	0.28%	0	0.00%	765	21.34%	3,585
Rockingham	4,829	70.27%	2,026	29.48%	16	0.23%	1	0.01%	2,803	40.79%	6,872
Russell	3,044	46.44%	3,496	53.34%	12	0.18%	2	0.03%	-452	-6.90%	6,554
Scott	4,936	56.45%	3,789	43.33%	15	0.17%	4	0.05%	1,147	13.12%	8,744
Shenandoah	4,144	66.85%	2,053	33.12%	2	0.03%	0	0.00%	2,091	33.73%	6,199
Smyth	4,256	59.62%	2,864	40.12%	16	0.22%	2	0.03%	1,392	19.50%	7,138
South Boston	807	62.70%	477	37.06%	2	0.16%	1	0.08%	330	25.64%	1,287
South Norfolk	1,341	38.09%	2,155	61.20%	24	0.68%	1	0.03%	-814	-23.11%	3,521
Southampton	1,263	30.62%	2,804	67.98%	57	1.38%	1	0.02%	-1,541	-37.36%	4,125
Spotsylvania	1,288	46.02%	1,482	52.95%	23	0.82%	6	0.21%	-194	-6.93%	2,799
Stafford	1,447	48.80%	1,494	50.39%	22	0.74%	2	0.07%	-47	-1.59%	2,965
Staunton	2,789	69.17%	1,233	30.58%	9	0.22%	1	0.02%	1,556	38.59%	4,032
Suffolk	1,406	49.61%	1,419	50.07%	9	0.32%	0	0.00%	-13	-0.46%	2,834
Surry	397	27.51%	1,003	69.51%	40	2.77%	3	0.21%	-606	-42.00%	1,443
Sussex	713	35.78%	1,253	62.87%	25	1.25%	2	0.10%	-540	-27.09%	1,993
Tazewell	3,139	41.44%	4,416	58.30%	19	0.25%	0	0.00%	-1,277	-16.86%	7,574
Virginia Beach	986	42.48%	1,301	56.05%	33	1.42%	1	0.04%	-315	-13.57%	2,321
Warren	1,842	49.52%	1,850	49.73%	25	0.67%	3	0.08%	-8	-0.21%	3,720
Washington	4,473	53.59%	3,833	45.92%	33	0.40%	8	0.10%	640	7.67%	8,347
Waynesboro	2,444	69.57%	1,047	29.80%	22	0.63%	0	0.00%	1,397	39.77%	3,513
Westmoreland	1,176	53.00%	1,034	46.60%	8	0.36%	1	0.05%	142	6.40%	2,219
Williamsburg	721	59.10%	486	39.84%	12	0.98%	1	0.08%	235	19.26%	1,220
Winchester	2,326	65.61%	1,203	33.94%	16	0.45%	0	0.00%	1,123	31.67%	3,545
Wise	3,876	39.89%	5,822	59.92%	17	0.17%	1	0.01%	-1,946	-20.03%	9,716
Wythe	2,871	57.50%	2,075	41.56%	39	0.78%	8	0.16%	796	15.94%	4,993
York	2,085	54.94%	1,691	44.56%	19	0.50%	0	0.00%	394	10.38%	3,795
Totals	404,521	52.44%	362,327	46.97%	4,204	0.54%	397	0.05%	42,194	5.47%	771,449

==== Counties and independent cities that flipped from Republican to Democratic ====
- Accomack
- Alexandria City
- Alleghany
- Bedford
- Caroline
- Buckingham
- Charles City
- Campbell
- Clarke
- Covington
- Falls Church City
- Giles
- Goochland
- King and Queen
- King George
- Lee
- Louisa
- Northampton
- Norfolk
- Petersburg City
- Prince George
- Princess Anne
- Prince William
- Spotsylvania
- Stafford
- Suffolk City
- Tazewell
- Virginia Beach City
- Warren

==== Counties and independent cities that flipped from Unpledged to Republican ====
- Prince Edward

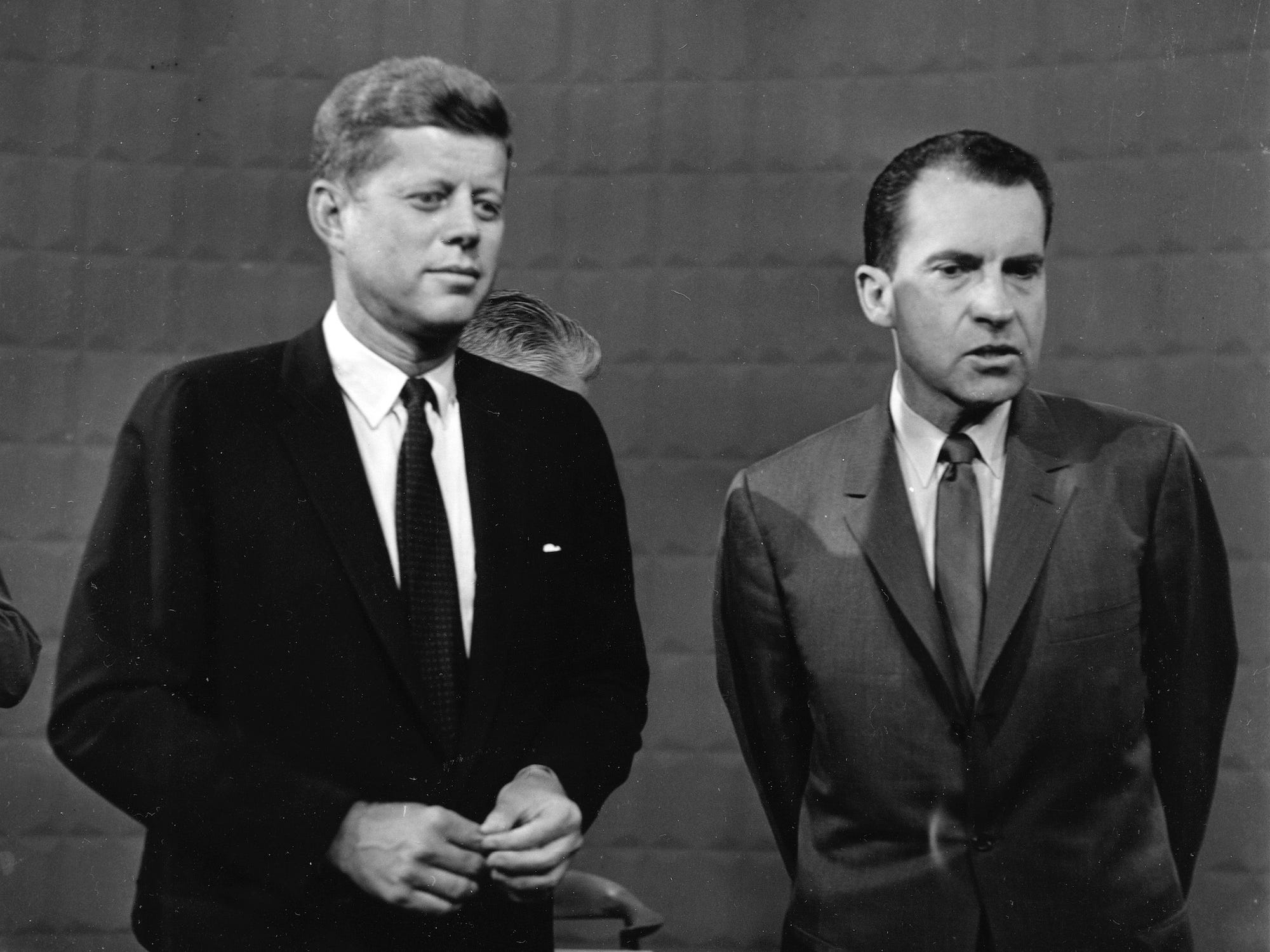
Senator John F. Kennedy (left) and Vice-president Richard Nixon (right), prior to their first presidential debate.

== Analysis ==
Unlike such states as Oklahoma, Tennessee or Kentucky, Nixon's victory in Virginia despite losing nationally did not reflect anti-Catholicism: only two counties or independent cities gave Nixon a better percentage than Eisenhower had won in 1956. Nixon's win reflected his continuing dominance of the Byrd Organization stronghold in the Shenandoah Valley, and maintaining Republican control of newly developing suburbs. Kennedy's general gain was greatest amongst the small but slowly growing black electorate, where he reversed Eisenhower's large gains at the preceding election.

As of the 2024 presidential election, this is the last occasion when Appomattox County, Campbell County, Lunenburg County, Mecklenburg County and Pittsylvania County have voted for a Democratic presidential candidate.

Virginia, as the polls hinted, voted for Nixon over Kennedy by a clear though not overwhelming 5.47 percentage point margin, still a double-digit decline from Eisenhower's two victories in the state. This was the first time a Democrat was elected president without carrying the state of Virginia, and the only time between 1924 and 1976 that Virginia backed the losing candidate.
