= 1951 Indianapolis mayoral election =

Indianapolis mayoral election, 1951
- November 6, 1951
- Turnout: 42.0%
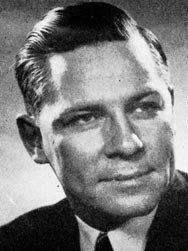

Nominee	Alex M. Clark	Philip L. Bayt
Party	Republican	Democratic
Popular vote	68,415	54,744
Percentage	55.6%	44.4%
Mayor before election
Philip L. Bayt
Democratic
Elected mayor
Alex M. Clark
Republican

The Indianapolis mayoral election of 1951 took place on November 6, 1951, and saw the election of Republican municipal court judge Alex M. Clark as mayor, defeating Democratic incumbent Philip L. Bayt. Clark became one of the youngest mayors in Indianapolis' history.

== Results ==
Subsequent to losing the election, Bayt resigned as mayor one month before his term expired in order to accept an appointment as judge of Municipal Court 3.

Indianapolis mayoral election, 1955
Party	Candidate	Votes	%
Republican	Alex M. Clark	68,415	55.6
Democratic	Philip L. Bayt (incumbent)	54,744	44.4
Turnout		123,159	42.0
Majority		13,671	11.1
Republican gain from Democratic			

Preceded by 1947	Indianapolis mayoral election 1955	Succeeded by 1955
