= 1955 Indianapolis mayoral election =

Indianapolis mayoral election, 1955
- November 8, 1955
- Turnout: 45.4%
Nominee	Philip L. Bayt	James O. Birr
Party	Democratic	Republican
Popular vote	74,682	58,497
Percentage	56.1%	43.9%
Mayor before election
Alex M. Clark
Republican
Elected mayor
Philip L. Bayt
Democratic

The Indianapolis mayoral election of 1955 took place on November 8, 1955, and saw the election of Philip L. Bayt to a second non-consecutive term. Bayt's opponent was Republican James O. Birr.

== Results ==
Indianapolis mayoral election, 1955
Party	Candidate	Votes	%
Democratic	Philip L. Bayt	7,468	56.1
Republican	James O. Birr	58,497	43.9
Turnout		133,179	45.4
Majority		16,185	12.2
Democratic gain from Republican			

Preceded by 1951	Indianapolis mayoral election 1955	Succeeded by 1959
