= 1947 Indianapolis mayoral election =

Indianapolis mayoral election, 1947
- November 4, 1947
Nominee	Albert G. Feeney	William Wemmer
Party	Democratic	Republican
Popular vote	68,415	54,744
Percentage	55.6%	44.4%
Mayor before election
George L. Denny
Republican
Elected mayor
Albert G. Feeney
Democratic

The Indianapolis mayoral election of 1947 took place on November 4, 1947, and saw the election of Democrat Al Feeney, who defeated Republican William Wemmer. Democrats swept city offices in the coinciding elections. Ahead of the election, a high level of Democratic voter registration caused it to be anticipated that Fenney would have a strong chance of winning.

== Results ==
Indianapolis mayoral election, 1947
Party	Candidate	Votes	%
Democratic	Albert G. Feeney	70,373	53.2
Republican	William Wemmer	62,022	46.9
Turnout		132,395	
Majority		8,351	6.3
Democratic gain from Republican			

Preceded by 1943	Indianapolis mayoral election 1947	Succeeded by 1951
