= John E. Sheffield Jr. =

American politician

John E. Sheffield Jr. was a state legislator in Georgia. He was a segregationist. He proposed a bill to establish a Georgia Sovereignty Commission to counter desegregation efforts, but the bill failed to get enough votes despite a majority supporting it. He represented Brooks County, Georgia.

He married Berry College graduate Melba Griffin who was a receptionist for Georgia governor Marvin Griffin.

He was a candidate in the 1953 United States House of Representatives elections. He was succeeded in the House by Henry L. Reaves in 1963.

He campaigned for Lieutenant Governor of Georgia in 1962 (Electoral history of Lester Maddox).
