= 1954 United States elections =

- ← 1952 1953 1954 1955 1956 → Midterm elections
- Election day: November 2
- Incumbent president: ▌Dwight D. Eisenhower (R)
- Next Congress: 84th

Senate elections
- Overall control: Democratic gain
- Seats contested: 38 of 96 seats (32 Class 2 seats + 9 special elections)
- Net seat change: Democratic +2
- 1954 Senate election results Democratic gain Democratic hold Republican gain Republican hold

House elections
- Overall control: Democratic gain
- Seats contested: All 435 voting seats
- Popular vote margin: Democratic +5.5%
- Net seat change: Democratic +19
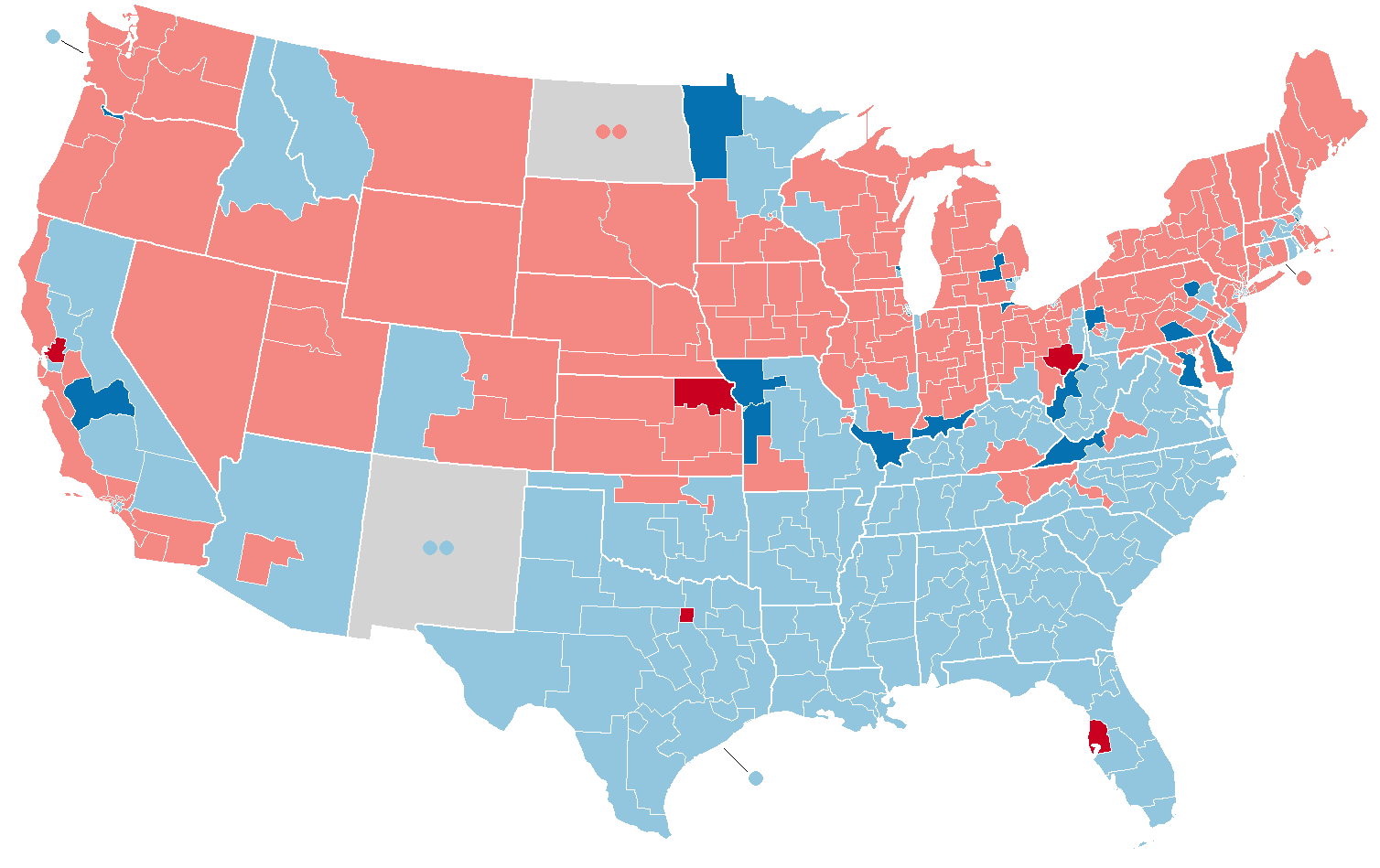

Gubernatorial elections
- Seats contested: 34
- Net seat change: Democratic +8
- 1954 gubernatorial election results Democratic gain Democratic hold Republican hold

Elections were held on November 2, 1954. The election took place in the middle of Republican President Dwight D. Eisenhower's first term. In the election, the Republicans lost the Congressional majorities which they had won in the previous election; Democratic gains were modest, but were enough for the party to win back control of both chambers of Congress.

In the House, the Republicans lost eighteen seats to the Democratic Party, losing control of the chamber. The Republicans would not retake the House until 1994. The Republicans also lost control of the U.S. Senate, losing two seats to the Democrats. The Republicans would not retake control of the Senate until 1980.

A contribution to the Republican reversal was backlash against GOP-driven McCarthyism and the numerous controversies it spawned, including the Army–McCarthy hearings. Other factors included a comment made in Detroit by Defense Secretary Charles Wilson, former president of General Motors, equating unemployed auto workers with "lazy kennel dogs who sit... and yell."

However, it has been pointed out that losses in the midterm election were considerably less than the White House party generally faces in the midterm elections, and this has been attributed to the overall popularity of President Eisenhower, who participated in the campaign along with Vice-President Richard Nixon and other members of the cabinet.

== See also ==
- 1954 United States House of Representatives elections
- 1954 United States Senate elections
- 1954 United States gubernatorial elections
