= 1956 United States elections =

- ← 1954 1955 1956 1957 1958 → Presidential election year
- Election day: November 6
- Incumbent president: ▌Dwight D. Eisenhower (R)
- Next Congress: 85th

Presidential election
- Partisan control: Republican hold
- Popular vote margin: Republican +15.4%
- Electoral vote
- Dwight D. Eisenhower (R): 457
- Adlai Stevenson (D): 73
- 1956 presidential election results. Red denotes states won by Eisenhower, blue denotes states won by Stevenson. Numbers indicate the electoral votes won by each candidate.

Senate elections
- Overall control: Democratic hold
- Seats contested: 35 of 96 seats (32 Class 3 seats + 3 special elections)
- Net seat change: 0
- 1956 Senate results Democratic gain Democratic hold Republican gain Republican hold

House elections
- Overall control: Democratic hold
- Seats contested: All 435 voting members
- Popular vote margin: Democratic +2.5%
- Net seat change: Democratic +2

Gubernatorial elections
- Seats contested: 30
- Net seat change: Democratic +2
- 1956 gubernatorial election results Democratic gain Democratic hold Republican gain Republican hold

Elections were held on Tuesday, November 6, 1956. Incumbent Republican President Dwight D. Eisenhower won reelection in a landslide, while the Democrats retained control of Congress.

In the presidential election, Republican President Dwight D. Eisenhower defeated Democratic former Governor Adlai E. Stevenson of Illinois in a re-match of the 1952 election. Eisenhower won the popular vote by fifteen points and once again won every state outside the Southern United States. At the Democratic convention, Stevenson easily defeated New York Governor W. Averell Harriman, taking the nomination on the first ballot.

In the Senate, the party balance of the chamber remained unchanged as Republican and Democratic gains cancelled each other out. In the House, the Democrats picked up two seats, increasing their majority.

This was the first of two consecutive election cycles in which the winning presidential candidate did not have coattails in either house of Congress.

== See also ==
- 1956 United States presidential election
- 1956 United States House of Representatives elections
- 1956 United States Senate elections
- 1956 United States gubernatorial elections
