= 1953 United States House of Representatives elections =

There were eight special elections to the United States House of Representatives in 1953, during the 83rd United States Congress, giving Democrats two additional seats.

== List of elections ==
District	Incumbent			This race	
District	Member	Party	First elected	Results	Candidates
Georgia 2	Edward E. Cox	Democratic	1924	Incumbent member-elect died December 24, 1952. New member elected February 4, 1953. Democratic hold.	▌ ✓ J. L. Pilcher (Democratic) 35.50%; ▌H. Grady Rawls (Democratic) 31.66%; ▌Harry L. Wingate (Democratic) 19.71%; ▌John E. Sheffield Jr. (Democratic) 10.16%; Others: ▌J. Cheney Robinson (Democratic) 1.17%; ▌Lonnie Brookard (Democratic) 1.13%
Virginia 5	Thomas B. Stanley	Democratic	1946	Incumbent resigned February 3, 1953, to run for Governor of Virginia. New member elected April 14, 1953. Democratic hold.	▌ ✓ William M. Tuck (Democratic) 57.81%; ▌Lorne R. Campbell (Republican) 42.19%
South Carolina 4	Joseph R. Bryson	Democratic	1938	Incumbent died March 10, 1953. New member elected June 2, 1953. Democratic hold.	▌ ✓ Robert T. Ashmore (Democratic) 44.15%; ▌Charles C. Moore (Democratic) 36.93%; ▌Robert C. Wasson (Democratic) 10.80%; ▌Francis M. Easterling (Democratic) 5.40%; ▌John F. Barry (Democratic) 1.73%
Illinois 7	Adolph J. Sabath	Democratic	1906	Incumbent member-elect died November 6, 1952. New member elected July 7, 1953. Democratic hold.	▌ ✓ James Bowler (Democratic) 83.50%; ▌Philip J. Boffa (Republican) 16.49%
Kentucky 2	Garrett Withers	Democratic	1952	Incumbent died April 30, 1953. New member elected August 1, 1953. Democratic hold.	▌ ✓ William Natcher (Democratic); Unopposed
Wisconsin 9	Merlin Hull	Republican	1928; 1930 (lost); 1934	Incumbent died May 17, 1953. New member elected October 13, 1953. Democratic gain.	▌ ✓ Lester Johnson (Democratic) 56.87%; ▌Arthur L. Padrutt (Republican) 43.13%
New Jersey 6	Clifford P. Case	Republican	1944	Incumbent resigned August 16, 1953 to run for Governor of New Jersey. New member elected November 3, 1953. Democratic gain.	▌ ✓ Harrison A. Williams (Democratic) 50.76%; ▌George F. Hetfield (Republican) 49.24%
California 24	Norris Poulson	Republican	1942; 1944 (lost); 1946	Incumbent resigned June 11, 1953, after being elected Mayor of Los Angeles. New member elected November 10, 1953. Republican hold.	▌ ✓ Glenard P. Lipscomb (Republican) 52.28%; ▌George L. Arnold (Democratic) 41.93%; ▌Bud Collier (Republican) 4.40%; ▌Irving Markheim (Democratic) 1.40%
