= 1955 United States gubernatorial elections =

- November 7, 1955 (KY and MS); January 17, 1956 (LA)

3 governorships
	Majority party	Minority party
Party	Democratic	Republican
Seats before	27	21
Seats after	27	21
Seat change	Steady	Steady
Seats up	3	0
Seats won	3	0
- Democratic hold

The 1955 United States gubernatorial elections were held in three states. Kentucky, Louisiana and Mississippi hold their gubernatorial elections in odd numbered years, every 4 years, preceding the United States presidential election year.

== Results ==
State	Incumbent	Party	Status	Opposing candidates
Kentucky	Lawrence Wetherby	Democratic	Term-limited, Democratic victory	Happy Chandler (Democratic) 58.02% Edwin R. Denney (Republican) 41.45% Robert H. Garrison (Prohibition) 0.35% Jesse K. Lewis (Free Citizens Party) 0.19%
Louisiana (Held, 17 January 1956)	Robert F. Kennon	Democratic	Term-limited, Democratic victory	Earl Long (Democratic) unopposed (Democratic primary results); Earl Long 51.44% deLesseps Story Morrison 23.27% Fred Preaus 11.71% Francis Grevemberg 7.60% James M. McLemore 5.88%
Mississippi	Hugh L. White	Democratic	Term-limited, Democratic victory	James P. Coleman (Democratic) unopposed (Democratic primary run-off results); James P. Coleman 55.64% Paul B. Johnson Jr. 44.36%
