= 1959 Indianapolis mayoral election =

Indianapolis mayoral election, 1959
- November 3, 1959
- Turnout: 41.1%
Nominee	Charles H. Boswell	William T. Sharp
Party	Democratic	Republican
Popular vote	70,031	51,994
Percentage	57.4%	42.6%
Mayor before election
Charles H. Boswell
Democratic
Elected mayor
Charles H. Boswell
Democratic

The Indianapolis mayoral election of 1959 took place on November 3, 1959, and saw the reelection of Charles H. Boswell, who had become mayor eleven months earlier, after Philip L. Bayt resigned to become Marion County Prosecutor. Boswell defeated Republican William T. Sharp.

== Results ==
Boswell won election.

1959 was a successful year for Democrats in Indiana's mayoral elections, with the party winning control of the mayoralties of all of the state's top seven most populous cities. This is a feat that the Democratic Party would not replicate until 2003.

Indianapolis mayoral election, 1959
Party	Candidate	Votes	%
Democratic	Charles H. Boswell (incumbent)	70,031	57.4
Republican	William T. Sharp	51,994	42.6
Turnout		122,025	41.1
Majority		18,037	14.7
Democratic hold			

Preceded by 1955	Indianapolis mayoral election 1959	Succeeded by 1963
