= Antelope Club =

Nonprofit social club in Indianapolis, Indiana, U.S.

The Antelope Club
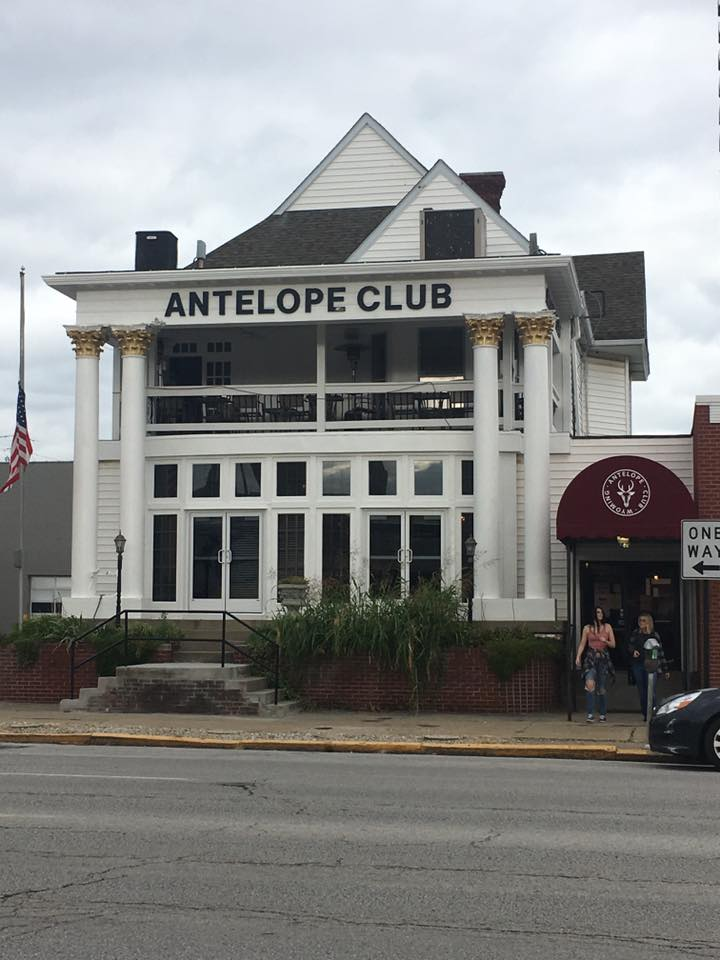
- Type: Private club
- Founded: 1956
- Headquarters: 615 N. Delaware St. Indianapolis, Indiana 46204
- Website: www.theantelopeclub.org

The Antelope Club (legally the Wyoming Antelope Hunter's Protective Association, Inc.) is a non-profit social club in Indianapolis, Indiana. It is governed by a nine-member volunteer board of directors, elected by club members.

The club is organized under United States laws for 501(c)(7) Social and Recreation Clubs. In 2024, it claimed total revenue of $628,300 and total assets of $309,156.

The Antelope Club has membership reciprocity with nearly 100 social and country clubs across the United States, Canada, Europe, and Asia.

== Club history ==
In 1947, a growing group of Indianapolis men began meeting regularly to drink at Jim Hussey's Sportsman's Club at 934 N. Pennsylvania St (in the block known as "Little Broadway"). When they outgrew Hussey's, they began to meet on the second floor of La Rue's Supper Club, at 1121 N. Pennsylvania Ave. There, it was suggested that the men begin an annual trip to Douglas, Wyoming, to hunt Antelope. The meat from these trips would be brought back to Indianapolis and served at an annual 'Man of the Year' party, where one deserving man would be roasted and honored for contributions to the community or the club. Later, other events were organized, including holiday parties, fishing trips, charity fundraisers, and excursions to the Indianapolis Speedway to attend qualifications and the Indianapolis 500.

Charter members of the club included Indianapolis Mayor Alex Clark, Indiana Governor Harold W. Handley, Olympic Silver medalist in swimming Frank McKinney Sr., Sheriff Dan Smith, Ed French (owner of Monarch Beverage), and the first club president, Al Schilling.

The Antelope Club was officially chartered on June 12 of 1956 as the Indiana Chapter of the Wyoming Antelope Club. Mayor Alex Clark was named the 'Grand Antler,' and local business executive Al Schilling was named the first president. The association's charter was drafted by Tom Quinn Sr. at the bar of the Hotel Washington and outlined the club's purpose:

- To protect and preserve wildlife and fish, lakes and streams,
- To promote and encourage athletics among juveniles and juvenile organizations,
- To promote and encourage good fellowship among members,
- To own and operate a facility or facilities to afford the opportunity for personal contact, co-mingling, and socializing among members.

In April 1960, LaRue's came under investigation regarding 18 phone lines that were allegedly used to conduct illegal gambling. The Antelope Club, along with other organizations that met at LaRue's, was expelled.

In February 1963, the club began meeting at space shared with the Mecca Club, which was then located at 1421 North Central Ave. After a split with the Mecca Club (allegedly after a reveler broke and fell out of a second-story window), it was decided that the club should find its own space.

In July 1963, the club held a car raffle to raise $8,400 for a down payment on the house at 615 N. Delaware St. A meeting was held at the Holiday Inn at 4665 West 16th Street in Speedway, Indiana where a motion was made and passed to sell club equity shares for $100 each. Judge Paul Lustgarten purchased the first share, and approximately $22,000 was raised. After extensive renovation to the property, the club grand opening was held on April 10, 1964. The $35,000 mortgage would be paid off in 1977.

In 1966, the Antelope Club donated funds to the Indianapolis Zoo for the purchase of three antelope.

In 1967, an apartment block across Delaware street became available. On June 9, the club took out a $110,000 mortgage and purchased the property. On December 2, the apartment building was demolished, and a parking lot was built.

On August 21, 1969, a fire broke out in the rear of the building, causing approximately $10,000 of damage to the kitchen and roof.

In 1975, Club member Charles "Jug" Eckert took a $1,000 bet that he could eat 100 White Castle hamburgers in a single sitting. Several club members walked the two blocks from the club to the White Castle restaurant at Fort Wayne Ave. and Walnut St., where Eckert reportedly ate 102 hamburgers. This effort earned Eckert a listing in the Guinness Book of World Records for having eaten the most White Castle sliders in a single sitting.

In 1978, the club came under investigation by the Indianapolis Police Department for high-stakes poker games occurring on-site. In July 1978, IPD officers conducted a raid on a game at Riley Towers, which was organized by club members, and which included Marion County Sheriff Joe McAtee.

Like many private clubs, the Antelope Club saw declining membership after 1980, from roughly 1,000 members in 1980 to about 250 in 2004. In early 2005, Jason Barclay and David Wu, staffers of the new Daniels gubernatorial administration were looking for somewhere to socialize. Poking their heads into the Antelope Club and recognizing names such as Alex and Jimmy Clark, Tom Carnegie and Rex Early, they realized they might have found the right place. They joined the club and brought in a whole herd of young Turks who quickly discovered that they enjoyed hearing the stories of the old-timers as much as they enjoyed the club's tenderloins. In May 2017, membership had rebounded to roughly 515.

On January 3, 2016, a fire broke out in the club basement due to faulty wiring. Club Treasurer Evan Shearin was mildly injured when he entered the basement to attempt to combat the fire. The club was closed for several weeks of repair and renovation during which members met regularly on the second floor of The Elbow Room, at 605 N Pennsylvania St. The Antelope Club was re-opened on February 10, 2016.

In January 2017, the Antelope Club was fined $500 by the Indiana Alcohol and Tobacco Commission for illegally serving Yuengling. The fine, stemming from a complaint by a disgruntled club member, was levied just months before Yuengling was legalized for sale in Indiana in March, 2017. The club released an apology to the ATC, the media, and the public.

In March 2017 the mounted Jackalope head, that had been a fixture of the club for decades, was stolen. A reward totaling $550 was offered by club members, but the head has thus far not been recovered. A new Jackalope head was donated by member Sam Goldstein in July 2017.

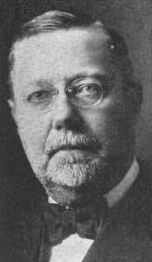
Joseph C. Gardner, 1921

In December 2019, club president Ashley Miller was profiled in the Indianapolis Star as the first female club president.

During the COVID-19 pandemic, the Antelope club closed temporarily, but members held periodic video conferences to socialize and keep in touch during quarantine.

== Building history ==
The building at 615 North Delaware Street was originally constructed in 1898 as a private residence by Joseph C. Gardner and his wife, Minnie Gardner (née Richenmeyer). Joseph Gardner was a worker at, and eventual owner of, his father's sheet-iron company. He later served as the president of the Sheet Metal Contractors Association of Indiana.

City directories list Joseph Gardner residing at the house from 1899 until his death in 1947. It remained vacant until 1952, when it was remodeled to house office space. From 1952 until 1954, two insurance offices, Edward Donaldson's Triangle Insurance Agency and John W. Brouwer's Brouwer Agency, Inc. occupied the house. In 1954, the second floor contained the offices of accountant Donald Weinberg and the Speakman-Devoll Company, who dealt in duplicating machines. The house was again vacant in 1955 before serving as the offices for the Standard Motor Indemnity Insurance Company from 1956 to 1959. The house was vacant once again from 1961 to 1964, when it was purchased by the Antelope Club.

In July 2017, partly funded by a grant from the city of Indianapolis, the club performed a restoration of the building facade. This included re-skinning the awning, replacing signage, repainting, and applying filler to the base of the columns to combat wood rot. The double doors into the dining room were replaced, and second set of doors was installed. Also, the handrail on the brick and concrete steps leading to the sidewalk was replaced.

In early January 2019, the Antelope Club suffered yet another fire. The building was saved, and the club took the opportunity to renovate the bar, dining room, and foyer. New flooring was installed, along with a tin ceiling in the main bar and dining room, new fixtures, and other improvements.

== Architectural features ==
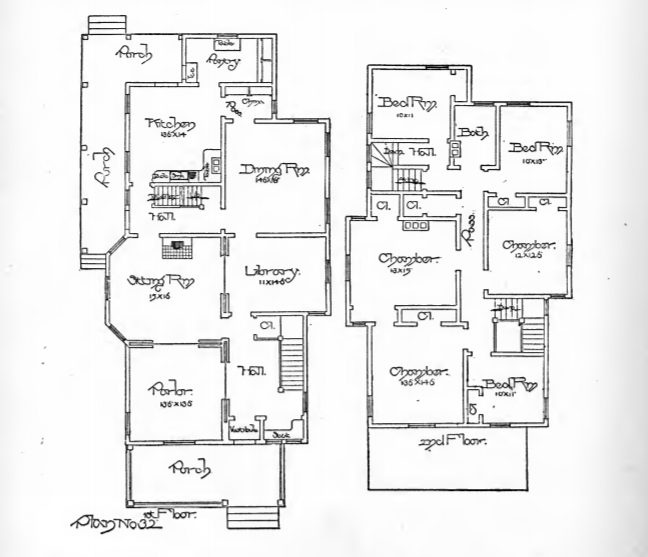
House Plan 32 from "Convenient Houses with Fifty Plans for the Housekeeper"(1889) by Louis H. Gibson

Originally built as a private residence, the Antelope Club is an example of Neo-Classical architecture. The facade includes Corinthian columns, bay windows, and a second-story balcony. Inside the club is a bar, dining room, game room, two meeting and event rooms, an office, and the Al Schilling Cigar Lounge.

The wood-frame structure rests on a red brick foundation and was originally clad in wood clapboards. It reflects the popular Queen Anne style in its varied roofline and projected bay windows. The house originally featured a metal roof, likely provided by the Joseph Gardner Company. The interior was trimmed with oak and featured large rooms that could be accessed by opening pocket doors. As originally built, the Gardner house resembled Plan No. 32 in the book Convenient Houses with Fifty Plans for the Housekeeper (1889), published by Indianapolis architect Louis H. Gibson. A back porch was added in 1915.

Upon purchase by the Antelope Club, remodeling was undertaken to better suit the club's needs. The front parlor and reception hall were combined into one large dining room and the front wall of the first floor was removed, allowing a new bay window to be installed in place of the original front porch. A new portico with four Corinthian columns was constructed across the front of the house, and the roof of the dining room was converted to a second-story balcony. Rooms in the north east of the house were combined to create a bar. New restrooms were installed, and a one-story breezeway was built over the south side yard to serve as a new entrance.

For many years, a large satellite dish was mounted prominently on the roof of the club.

== Notable members ==
- Otis Bowen - former governor of Indiana and U.S. Secretary of Health and Human Services.
- Keith Bulen Indiana state representative, Republican National Committeeman, Marion County GOP chairman, and 1966 Antelope Club Man of the Year.
- Dan Burton - former U.S. Congressman from Indiana.
- Homer E. Capehart - former United States senator.
- Alex Clark - mayor of Indianapolis.
- Harold W. Handley - former governor of Indiana.
- Eric Holcomb - governor of Indiana.
- William H. Hudnut III - U.S. Congressman and Mayor of Indianapolis
- Bill Levin - founder of the First Church of Cannabis.
- Richard Lugar - Former mayor of Indianapolis and United States senator.
- Frank McKinney - Olympic silver medalist in swimming.
- John Mutz - former lieutenant governor of Indiana.
- Dan Quayle - former Indiana Congressman, senator, Vice President of the United States, and 1983 Antelope Club Man of the Year.
- Jim Merritt - Indiana state senator and chairman of the Marion County Republican Party.

== Photo gallery ==
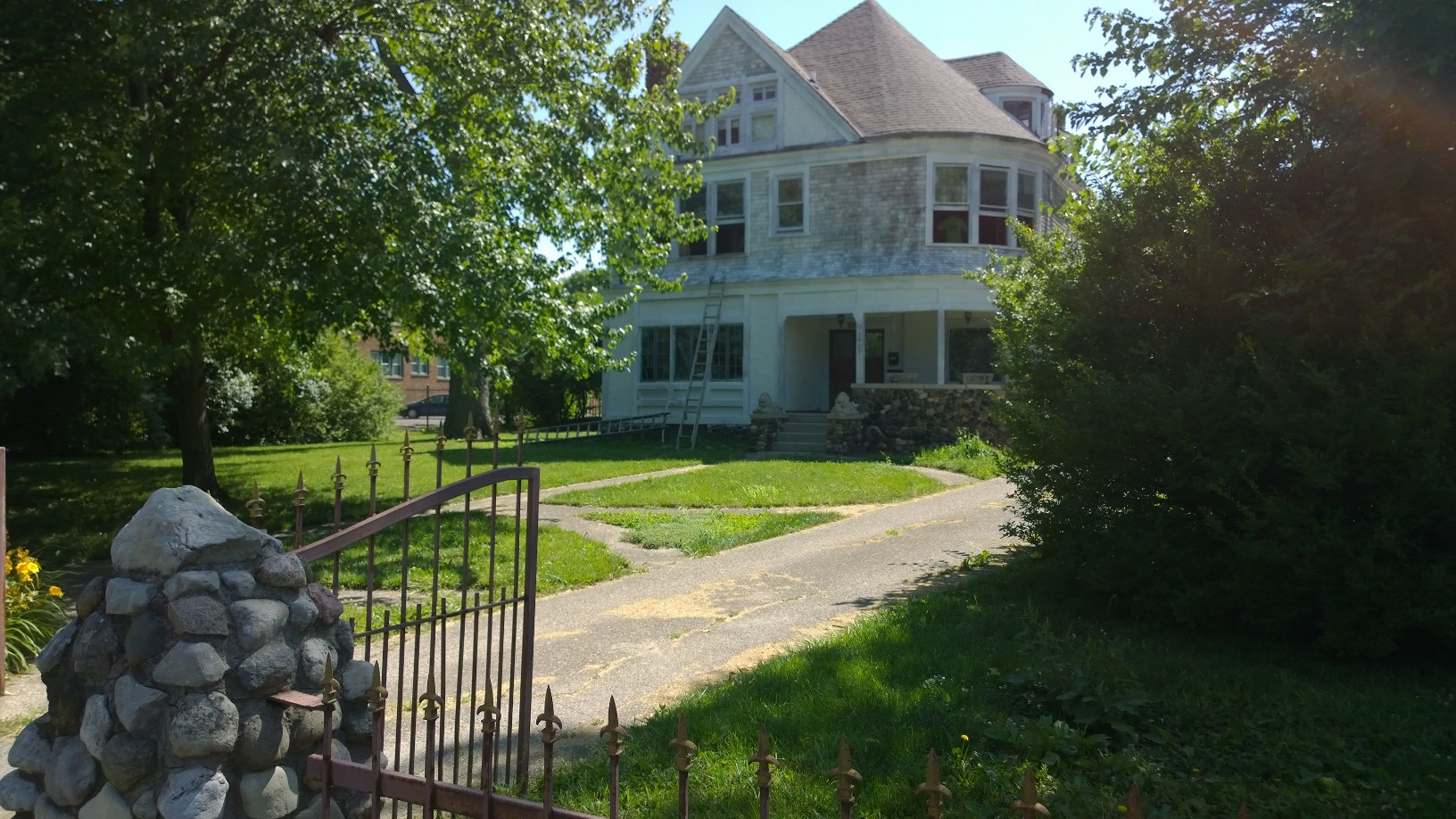
The former site of the Mecca Club at 1421 North Central Ave., which hosted the Antelope Club until the 1963 purchase of the Delaware Street location. June 13, 2016.

Indianapolis Star item reporting on the Antelope Club's dedication of its first headquarters at 1421 North Central Ave. February 24, 1963.

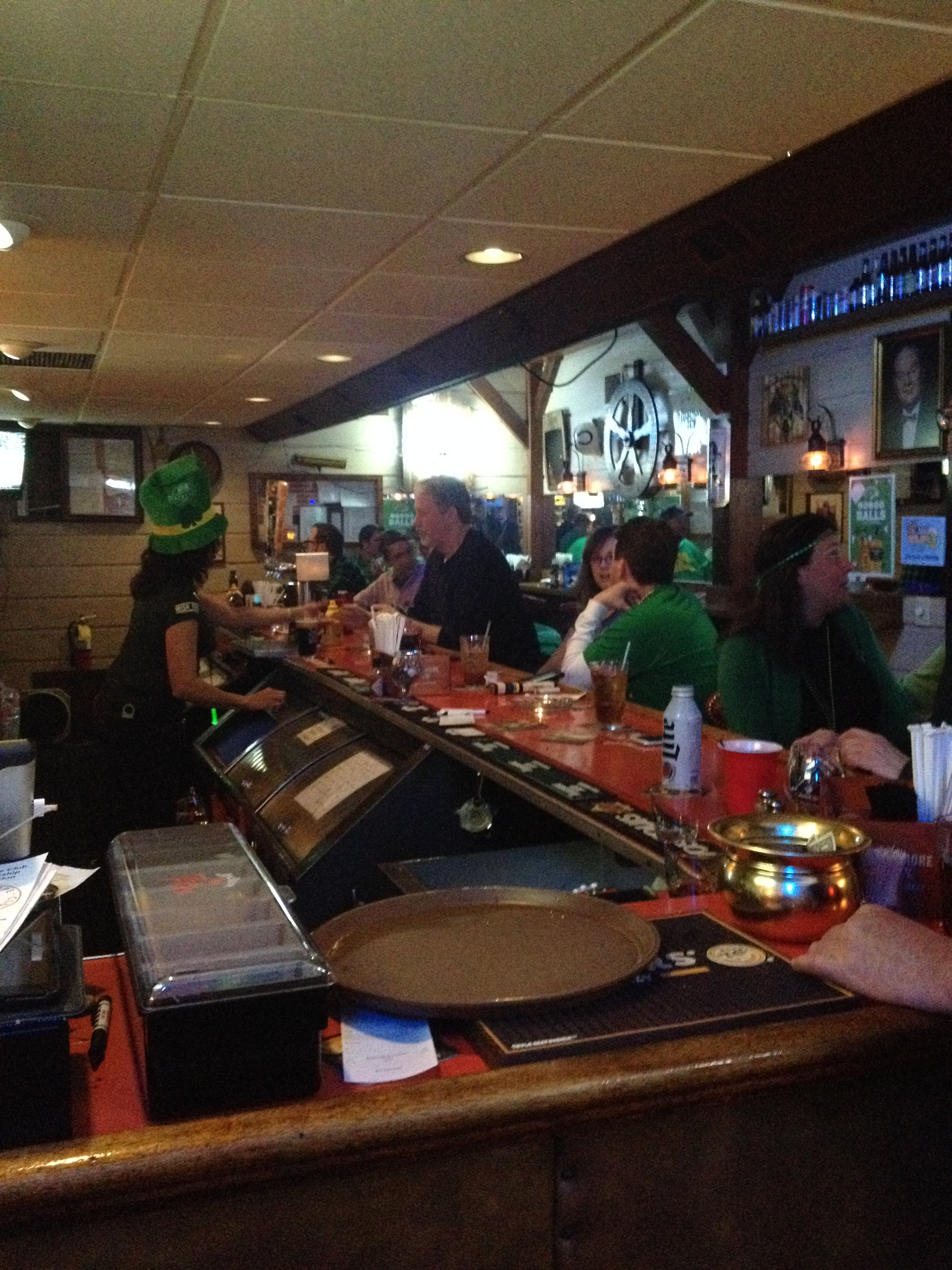
The bar of the Antelope Club on St. Patrick's Day. March 17, 2016.

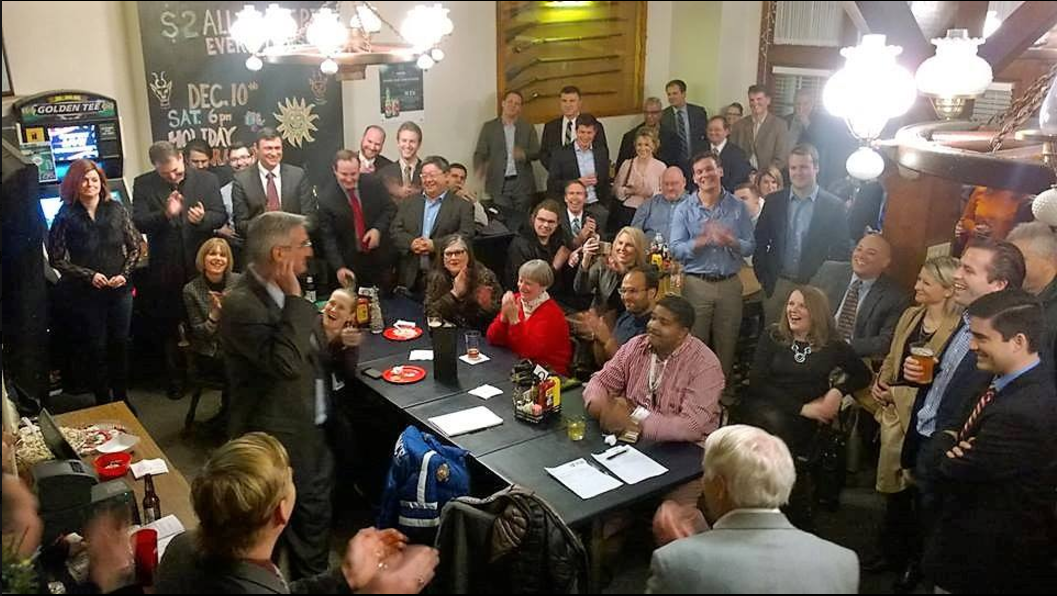
Governor Eric Holcomb speaking in the Antelope Club dining room. December 7, 2016.

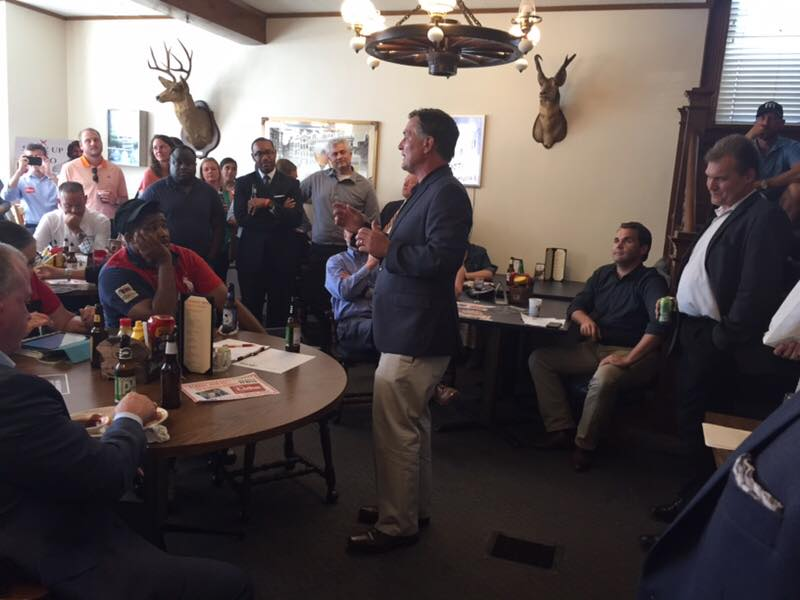
Congressman Luke Messer speaks at the Antelope Club. August 2, 2017

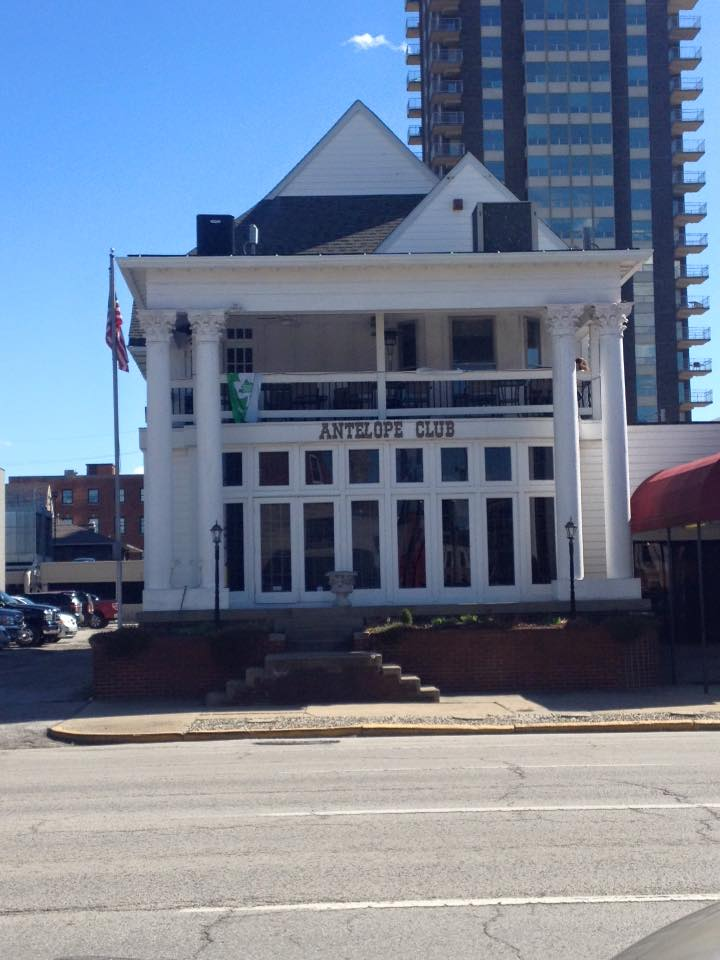
Antelope Club facade 2016, prior to the July 2017 renovation.
