= 1955 Israeli municipal elections =

Local elections in several municipalities and councils in Israel

The 1955 Israeli Municipal elections took place on 26 July 1955 alongside elections to the third Knesset.

These elections were the first in which Mapai ran under its real name, as it ran under the banner of 'the Histadrut list' in 1950.

== Elections by Municipality ==
=== In Cities ===
In Jerusalem, turnout stood at over 70%. Mapai, led by Gershon Agron, won six out of 21 seats in the City Council, as did religious parties. Herut won four seats, the Progressive Party won two, while WIZO, Ahdut HaAvoda and the General Zionists won one seat each. Mapam and Maki did not win any seats.

In Tel Aviv, turnout stood at over 75%. Mapai, led by Minister of Labor Golda Meir, won more than 30 of the vote and 10 out of 31 seats on the City Council, but were defeated by the General Zionists, led by Chaim Levanon, who formed a government with Religious parties and Herut.

In Haifa, Mapai, led by Incumbent Mayor Abba Hushi, won 8 out of 21 seats on the City Council, leading to Hushi's re-election. All other parties won two seats or less, except for the General Zionists, who won three.

In Beersheba, Mapai, led by incumbent Mayor David Tuviyahu, won 4 out of 13 seats on the City Council, leading to Tuviyahu's re-election. Mapam won 3 seats while the National Religious Party won 2. Ahdut HaAvoda and Herut won one seat each, while the General Zionists did not win any seats.

In Lod, incumbent Mapai mayor Pesach Lev was re-elected after his party won 4 out of 13 seats on the City Council.

In Acre, incumbent Mapai Mayor Iosef Gadish was re-elected after his party won 3 out of 13 seats on the City Council.

In Netanya, incumbent General Zionist Mayor Oved Ben-Ami was re-elected after his party won 3 out of 15 seats on the City Council. Mapai tied the General Zionists, winning 3 seats, while all other parties received two or less seats.

In Rishon LeZion, Gershon Mann became the mayor, and was replaced by Hanna Levine in October 1956.

=== In Regional Councils ===
In Even Yehuda, Progressive party candidate Yehuda Bachar, the sole member of his party in a nine-seat council, was elected to lead the council. In Beit Yitzhak, the Progressives won with five out of nine seats.

In Azor, Mapai candidate Avner Garin was elected to lead the Local Council after his party won 3 out of its 9 seats.

In Be'er Ya'akov, Mapai candidate Shalom Rinitz was elected to lead the Local Council after his party won 3 out of its 7 seats.

In Gedera, a Local List, led by Eliyahu Frenkel, was elected to lead the council.

== See also ==
- Municipal elections in Israel
