= 1955 Malayan local elections =

Local elections were held in the Federation of Malaya in 1955.

== Municipal election ==
=== George Town ===
Date: 3 December 1955; Electorate: Turnout: 29.8%
Wards	Elected councillor	Elected party
Alliance 3 (9)
Jelutong	1.	Alliance
Kelawei	1.	Alliance
Tanjong	1.	Alliance

=== Kuala Lumpur ===
Date: Electorate: Turnout:
Wards	Elected councillor	Elected party
?
Bangsar	1.	
Imbi	1.	
Petaling	1.	
Sentul	1.	

=== Malacca ===
Date: Electorate: Turnout:
Wards	Elected councillor	Elected party
?
Bukit China	1.	
Fort	1.	
Tranquerah	1.	

== Town councils election ==
=== Alor Star ===
Date: ~~13 August 1955~~; Electorate: Turnout: nil
Wards	Elected councillor	Elected party	Votes	Majority	Opponent(s)	Party	Votes
Alliance 4 (?)
Kampong	1. Abdullah Abdul Razak; 2. Sheikh Osman Sheikh Ibrahim	Alliance (UMNO); Alliance (UMNO)	Unopposed				
Pekan	1. Lim Pee Hung	Alliance (MCA)	Unopposed				
Seberang	1. Omar F. Mohamed	Alliance (UMNO)	Unopposed				

=== Bandar Maharani, Muar ===
Date: 3 December 1955; Electorate: Turnout:
Wards	Elected councillor	Elected party	Votes	Majority	Opponent(s)	Party	Votes
?
Maharani	1.						
Parit Stongkat	1.						
Sultan Ibrahim	1.						

=== Bandar Penggaram, Batu Pahat ===
Date: 3 December 1955; Electorate: Turnout:
Wards	Elected councillor	Elected party	Votes	Majority	Opponent(s)	Party	Votes
?
Gunong Soga	1.						
Jalan Sultanah	1.						
Kampong Petani	1. 2.						

=== Bukit Mertajam ===
Date: 3 December 1955; Electorate: Turnout:
Wards	Elected councillor	Elected party
?
	1.	
	1.	

=== Butterworth ===
Date: 3 December 1955; Electorate: Turnout:
Wards	Elected councillor	Elected party
?
North	1.	
South	1.	

=== Ipoh-Menglembu ===
Date: 8 December 1955; Electorate: Turnout:
Wards	Elected councillor	Elected party	Votes	Majority	Opponent(s)	Party	Votes
Alliance 4 (11) | PPP 1 (1)
Green Town	1.				Lean Chor Kow; Liew Why Hone		
Menglembu	1.				Baharuddin Aiyub; Choong Pak Keen		
Pasir Puteh	1.				Mohamed Ali Pitchay; Mohamed Yusoff Samad		
Silibin	1. 2.				Ahmad Sham Yunus; Leong Ah Kow; Wong Kok See		

=== Johore Bahru ===
Date: 3 December 1955; Electorate: Turnout:
Wards	Elected councillor	Elected party	Votes	Majority	Opponent(s)	Party	Votes
Alliance 3 (9)
Ayer Molek	1.	Alliance					
Nong Chik	1.	Alliance					
Tebrau	1.	Alliance					

=== Klang ===
Date: ~~3 December 1955~~; Electorate: Turnout: nil
Wards	Elected councillor	Elected party	Votes	Majority	Opponent(s)	Party	Votes
Alliance 3 (9)
Klang North	1. Abdullah Hassan	Alliance (UMNO)	Unopposed				
Klang South	1. A. Karuppiah	Alliance (MIC)	Unopposed				
Port Swettenham	1. Sheikh Hussain Sheikh Ali	Alliance (UMNO)	Unopposed				

=== Kluang ===
Date: 5 November 1955; Electorate: Turnout:
Wards	Elected councillor	Elected party	Votes	Majority	Opponent(s)	Party	Votes
?
Gunong Lambak	1.						
Mengkibol	1.						
Mesjid Lama	1.						

=== Kota Bharu ===
Date: 2 June 1955; Electorate: Turnout:
Wards	Elected councillor	Elected party	Votes	Majority	Opponent(s)	Party	Votes
?
Kubang Pasu	1.						
Kota Lama	1.						
Wakaf Pasu	1.						

=== Kuala Trengganu ===
Date: Electorate: Turnout:
Wards	Elected councillor	Elected party
Alliance 3 (?)
Bukit Besar	1. Endut Abdullah	Alliance (UMNO)
Kuala	1. Abdul Karim Hashim	Alliance (UMNO)
Ladang	1. Abu Bakar Daud	Alliance (UMNO)

=== Kuantan ===
Date: 25 October 1955; Electorate: Turnout:
Wards	Elected councillor	Elected party	Votes	Majority	Opponent(s)	Party	Votes
?
Central Town	1. 2.						
Tanah Puteh	1.						
Telok Sisek	1.						

=== Pasir Mas ===
Date: Electorate: Turnout:
Wards	Elected councillor	Elected party
?
Lemal	1.	
Kampong Bahru	1.	
Pengkalan Pasir	1.	

=== Raub ===
Date: 15 October 1955; Electorate: 1,255; Turnout:
Wards	Elected councillor	Elected party	Votes	Majority	Opponent(s)	Party	Votes
Alliance 12 (12)
Raub Australian Gold Mine	1. Hussain Jali; 2. Tan Cheng Kian; 3. Buyong Salas	Alliance (UMNO); Alliance (MCA); Alliance (UMNO)	Unopposed				
Raub Town	1.Ti Cheng Keng; 2. Abdul Latiff Ismail; 3. M. K. Govindasamy	Alliance (MCA); Alliance (UMNO); Alliance (MIC)			Goh Seng Khoon; Tan Ching Pin	Ind. Ind.	
Sempalit	1. M. Marimuttu; 2. Tan Liew Tong; 3. Kheong Hoy Cheng	Alliance (MIC); Alliance (MCA); Alliance (MCA)	Unopposed				
Tanjong Gadong	1. Chua Yong Guan; 2. Mohamed Arifin Ludin; 3. Saw Sin Hock	Alliance (MCA); Alliance (UMNO); Alliance (MCA)	Unopposed				

=== Segamat ===
Date: Electorate: Turnout:
Wards	Elected councillor	Elected party	Votes	Majority	Opponent(s)	Party	Votes
?
Buloh Kasap	1.						
Gemereh	1.						
Genuang	1.						

=== Seremban ===
Date: Electorate: Turnout:
Wards	Elected councillor	Elected party
?
Lake	1.	
Lobak	1.	
Rahang	1.	
Temiang	1.	

=== Sungei Patani ===
Date: Electorate: Turnout:
Wards	Elected councillor	Elected party
?
Pekan Bahru	1.	
Pekan Lama	1.	
Rural	1.	

=== Taiping ===
Date: 18 December 1955; Electorate: Turnout:
Wards	Elected councillor	Elected party	Votes	Majority	Opponent(s)	Party	Votes
Alliance 3 (9)
Assam Kumbang	1.	Alliance					
Klian Pau	1.	Alliance					
Kota	1.	Alliance					

=== Teluk Anson ===
Date: 10 December 1955; Electorate: Turnout:
Wards	Elected councillor	Elected party	Votes	Majority	Opponent(s)	Party	Votes
?
Changkat Jong	1.						
Denison Road	1.						
Pasir Bedamar	1.						
