= 1955 Soviet Union regional elections =

On February 27, 1955, elections were held for the Supreme Soviets of the Soviet Union's constituent republics.

According to Soviet law, 3,369,000 out of an eligible adult voting population of 123,174,000 were disenfranchised for various reasons.

== See also ==
- 1955 Estonian Supreme Soviet election
