= 1953 Virginia gubernatorial election =

- November 3, 1953
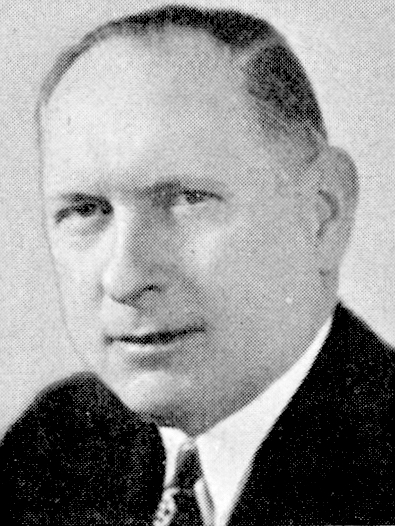

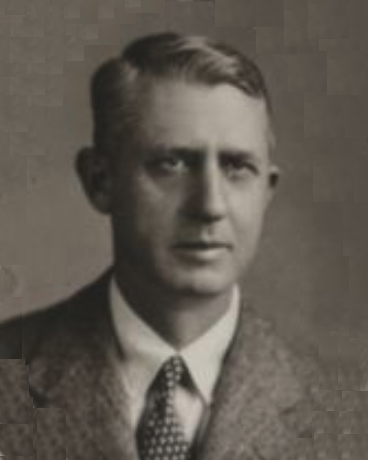
Nominee	Thomas B. Stanley	Ted Dalton
Party	Democratic	Republican
Popular vote	226,998	183,328
Percentage	54.83%	44.28%
- County and independent city results Stanley: 50–60% 60–70% 70–80% 80–90% Dalton: 40–50% 50–60% 60–70% 70–80%
Governor before election
John S. Battle
Democratic
Elected Governor
Thomas B. Stanley
Democratic

In the 1953 Virginia gubernatorial election, incumbent Governor John S. Battle, a Democrat, was unable to seek re-election due to term limits.

== Background ==
For the previous five decades Virginia had almost completely disenfranchised its black and poor white populations through the use of a cumulative poll tax and literacy tests. So restricted was suffrage in this period that it has been calculated that a third of Virginia's electorate during the first half of the twentieth century comprised state employees and officeholders. This limited electorate allowed Virginian politics to be controlled for four decades by the Byrd Organization, as progressive "antiorganization" factions were rendered impotent by the inability of almost all their potential electorate to vote. Historical fusion with the “Readjuster” Democrats, defection of substantial proportions of the Northeast-aligned white electorate of the Shenandoah Valley and Southwest Virginia over free silver, and an early move towards a "lily white" Jim Crow party meant Republicans retained a small but permanent number of legislative seats and local offices in the western part of the state.

From the 1940s the state's politics would be transformed by in-migration from the Northeast to Washington suburbs, which the preceding fall allowed the Republicans to win the state with a margin slightly exceeding their national one, and to elect three Congressmen. All this gave expectations of further GOP growth, especially considering the troubles the Organization had in the previous gubernatorial primary. The victory in a special election of loyal Byrd machine leader William M. Tuck produced debate whether that election was merely a repeat of 1928, as argued by The Daily Press in June or whether there was a major danger for the Democratic Party as suggested in April by The Evening Sun. Virginia's Republicans, however, were always hopeful that the election would not repeat that of 1929. After initially declining to run – with Nile Straughan of Fredericksburg the expected nominee – State Senator Theodore Roosevelt Dalton was unanimously nominated by the GOP on June 21.

== Campaign ==
Dalton campaigned hard throughout the fall, arguing for such reforms as updated election laws, popular election of school boards, more funds for mental health and greater emphasis upon manufacturing. Dalton was widely questioned by his Byrd opponent on the poll tax issue, but a poll late in September showed that his reforms were widely supported by legislative candidates according to the Virginia League of Women Voters.

The campaign would intensify in the final week of September, as Stanley became increasingly critical of Dalton's proposals. Later in October Senator Byrd would claim Dalton was running on a combination of failed bond plans from the neighbouring states of North Carolina and Maryland.

== Democratic primary ==
=== Candidates ===
- Charles R. Fenwick, State Senator from Arlington
- Thomas B. Stanley, former U.S. Representative from Stanleytown

=== Results ===
1953 Virginia Democratic gubernatorial primary
Party	Candidate	Votes	%	±%
Democratic	Thomas B. Stanley	150,499	65.95%	
Democratic	Charles R. Fenwick	77,715	34.05%	
Majority				
Turnout		413,999		
Democratic hold		Swing		

== General election ==
=== Candidates ===
- Thomas B. Stanley, former U.S. Representative from Stanleytown (Democratic)
- Theodore Roosevelt Dalton, State Senator from Radford (Republican)
- Howard Hearnes Carwile, trial lawyer from Richmond City (Independent)

=== Results ===
1953 Virginia gubernatorial election
Party	Candidate	Votes	%	±%
Democratic	Thomas B. Stanley	226,998	54.83%	−15.60%
Republican	Theodore Roosevelt Dalton	183,328	44.28%	+16.84%
Independent	Howard Carwile	3,673	0.89%	
Majority		43,670	10.55%	−32.44%
Turnout		413,999		+57.84%
Democratic hold		Swing		

==== Results by county or independent city ====
1953 Virginia gubernatorial election by county or independent city
	Thomas Bahnson Stanley Democratic		Theodore Roosevelt Dalton Republican		Howard Hearnes Carwile Independent		Margin		Total votes cast
	#	%	#	%	#	%	#	%	Total votes cast
Accomack County	1,866	66.29%	922	32.75%	27	0.96%	944	33.53%	2,815
Albemarle County	1,521	60.50%	983	39.10%	10	0.40%	538	21.40%	2,514
Alleghany County	551	47.50%	607	52.33%	2	0.17%	-56	-4.83%	1,160
Amelia County	715	66.08%	365	33.73%	2	0.18%	350	32.35%	1,082
Amherst County	1,527	70.17%	643	29.55%	6	0.28%	884	40.63%	2,176
Appomattox County	1,377	84.12%	259	15.82%	1	0.06%	1,118	68.30%	1,637
Arlington County	8,405	42.23%	10,903	54.78%	595	2.99%	-2,498	-12.55%	19,903
Augusta County	1,828	56.86%	1,376	42.80%	11	0.34%	452	14.06%	3,215
Bath County	498	50.15%	486	48.94%	9	0.91%	12	1.21%	993
Bedford County	2,427	64.04%	1,347	35.54%	16	0.42%	1,080	28.50%	3,790
Bland County	751	46.30%	858	52.90%	13	0.80%	-107	-6.60%	1,622
Botetourt County	1,261	47.60%	1,380	52.10%	8	0.30%	-119	-4.49%	2,649
Brunswick County	1,595	83.33%	317	16.56%	2	0.10%	1,278	66.77%	1,914
Buchanan County	2,707	55.26%	2,126	43.40%	66	1.35%	581	11.86%	4,899
Buckingham County	864	73.10%	310	26.23%	8	0.68%	554	46.87%	1,182
Campbell County	1,950	66.15%	985	33.41%	13	0.44%	965	32.73%	2,948
Caroline County	926	75.59%	289	23.59%	10	0.82%	637	52.00%	1,225
Carroll County	1,597	34.71%	2,992	65.03%	12	0.26%	-1,395	-30.32%	4,601
Charles City County	538	80.90%	114	17.14%	13	1.95%	424	63.76%	665
Charlotte County	1,496	82.56%	310	17.11%	6	0.33%	1,186	65.45%	1,812
Chesterfield County	2,412	54.99%	1,943	44.30%	31	0.71%	469	10.69%	4,386
Clarke County	689	78.03%	191	21.63%	3	0.34%	498	56.40%	883
Craig County	428	62.76%	251	36.80%	3	0.44%	177	25.95%	682
Culpeper County	1,107	68.84%	494	30.72%	7	0.44%	613	38.12%	1,608
Cumberland County	580	69.88%	243	29.28%	7	0.84%	337	40.60%	830
Dickenson County	2,773	50.27%	2,684	48.66%	59	1.07%	89	1.61%	5,516
Dinwiddie County	1,302	83.57%	253	16.24%	3	0.19%	1,049	67.33%	1,558
Essex County	542	72.65%	196	26.27%	8	1.07%	346	46.38%	746
Fairfax County	5,425	44.37%	6,658	54.45%	144	1.18%	-1,233	-10.08%	12,227
Fauquier County	1,686	75.34%	547	24.44%	5	0.22%	1,139	50.89%	2,238
Floyd County	570	31.05%	1,261	68.68%	5	0.27%	-691	-37.64%	1,836
Fluvanna County	654	68.55%	297	31.13%	3	0.31%	357	37.42%	954
Franklin County	1,921	55.09%	1,560	44.74%	6	0.17%	361	10.35%	3,487
Frederick County	1,457	78.29%	385	20.69%	19	1.02%	1,072	57.60%	1,861
Giles County	1,599	48.43%	1,692	51.24%	11	0.33%	-93	-2.82%	3,302
Gloucester County	893	70.09%	370	29.04%	11	0.86%	523	41.05%	1,274
Goochland County	738	68.33%	338	31.30%	4	0.37%	400	37.04%	1,080
Grayson County	3,336	45.83%	3,893	53.48%	50	0.69%	-557	-7.65%	7,279
Greene County	230	51.00%	219	48.56%	2	0.44%	11	2.44%	451
Greensville County	1,083	75.42%	336	23.40%	17	1.18%	747	52.02%	1,436
Halifax County	2,979	82.70%	608	16.88%	15	0.42%	2,371	65.82%	3,602
Hanover County	1,373	56.16%	1,052	43.03%	20	0.82%	321	13.13%	2,445
Henrico County	4,301	45.44%	5,110	53.98%	55	0.58%	-809	-8.55%	9,466
Henry County	2,131	54.91%	1,724	44.42%	26	0.67%	407	10.49%	3,881
Highland County	473	59.42%	321	40.33%	2	0.25%	152	19.10%	796
Isle of Wight County	1,066	65.40%	546	33.50%	18	1.10%	520	31.90%	1,630
James City County	263	48.70%	269	49.81%	8	1.48%	-6	-1.11%	540
King and Queen County	326	72.93%	107	23.94%	14	3.13%	219	48.99%	447
King George County	509	65.34%	257	32.99%	13	1.67%	252	32.35%	779
King William County	557	69.97%	225	28.27%	14	1.76%	332	41.71%	796
Lancaster County	580	52.02%	508	45.56%	27	2.42%	72	6.46%	1,115
Lee County	3,167	45.69%	3,587	51.75%	177	2.55%	-420	-6.06%	6,931
Loudoun County	1,986	72.85%	699	25.64%	41	1.50%	1,287	47.21%	2,726
Louisa County	1,046	66.97%	495	31.69%	21	1.34%	551	35.28%	1,562
Lunenburg County	1,175	77.40%	336	22.13%	7	0.46%	839	55.27%	1,518
Madison County	578	61.82%	350	37.43%	7	0.75%	228	24.39%	935
Mathews County	517	55.18%	414	44.18%	6	0.64%	103	10.99%	937
Mecklenburg County	2,199	77.95%	608	21.55%	14	0.50%	1,591	56.40%	2,821
Middlesex County	542	66.75%	267	32.88%	3	0.37%	275	33.87%	812
Montgomery County	1,708	35.64%	3,074	64.14%	11	0.23%	-1,366	-28.50%	4,793
Nansemond County	1,374	73.79%	480	25.78%	8	0.43%	894	48.01%	1,862
Nelson County	799	71.98%	305	27.48%	6	0.54%	494	44.50%	1,110
New Kent County	343	64.35%	174	32.65%	16	3.00%	169	31.71%	533
Norfolk County	4,442	57.74%	3,207	41.69%	44	0.57%	1,235	16.05%	7,693
Northampton County	1,295	79.35%	329	20.16%	8	0.49%	966	59.19%	1,632
Northumberland County	477	51.02%	444	47.49%	14	1.50%	33	3.53%	935
Nottoway County	1,438	73.59%	503	25.74%	13	0.67%	935	47.85%	1,954
Orange County	1,039	65.43%	537	33.82%	12	0.76%	502	31.61%	1,588
Page County	1,593	61.96%	955	37.15%	23	0.89%	638	24.82%	2,571
Patrick County	1,720	72.30%	653	27.45%	6	0.25%	1,067	44.85%	2,379
Pittsylvania County	3,784	73.86%	1,317	25.71%	22	0.43%	2,467	48.16%	5,123
Powhatan County	572	69.42%	247	29.98%	5	0.61%	325	39.44%	824
Prince Edward County	1,120	71.43%	441	28.13%	7	0.45%	679	43.30%	1,568
Prince George County	571	72.74%	209	26.62%	5	0.64%	362	46.11%	785
Prince William County	1,382	72.51%	517	27.12%	7	0.37%	865	45.38%	1,906
Princess Anne County	2,200	56.77%	1,663	42.92%	12	0.31%	537	13.86%	3,875
Pulaski County	1,620	41.08%	2,316	58.72%	8	0.20%	-696	-17.65%	3,944
Rappahannock County	616	80.10%	153	19.90%	0	0.00%	463	60.21%	769
Richmond County	363	57.80%	260	41.40%	5	0.80%	103	16.40%	628
Roanoke County	2,184	34.71%	4,092	65.03%	16	0.25%	-1,908	-30.32%	6,292
Rockbridge County	1,162	50.02%	1,154	49.68%	7	0.30%	8	0.34%	2,323
Rockingham County	2,561	63.87%	1,393	34.74%	56	1.40%	1,168	29.13%	4,010
Russell County	2,845	53.92%	2,406	45.60%	25	0.47%	439	8.32%	5,276
Scott County	1,896	33.70%	3,640	64.70%	90	1.60%	-1,744	-31.00%	5,626
Shenandoah County	2,079	48.79%	2,160	50.69%	22	0.52%	-81	-1.90%	4,261
Smyth County	2,147	43.50%	2,749	55.69%	40	0.81%	-602	-12.20%	4,936
Southampton County	1,431	71.98%	545	27.41%	12	0.60%	886	44.57%	1,988
Spotsylvania County	878	61.40%	540	37.76%	12	0.84%	338	23.64%	1,430
Stafford County	609	48.10%	650	51.34%	7	0.55%	-41	-3.24%	1,266
Surry County	596	81.20%	135	18.39%	3	0.41%	461	62.81%	734
Sussex County	1,256	84.24%	222	14.89%	13	0.87%	1,034	69.35%	1,491
Tazewell County	2,072	51.76%	1,908	47.66%	23	0.57%	164	4.10%	4,003
Warren County	1,163	65.04%	614	34.34%	11	0.62%	549	30.70%	1,788
Warwick County	1,631	48.15%	1,723	50.87%	33	0.97%	-92	-2.72%	3,387
Washington County	2,237	50.98%	2,118	48.27%	33	0.75%	119	2.71%	4,388
Westmoreland County	650	61.15%	410	38.57%	3	0.28%	240	22.58%	1,063
Wise County	4,876	62.05%	2,928	37.26%	54	0.69%	1,948	24.79%	7,858
Wythe County	2,586	43.38%	3,350	56.20%	25	0.42%	-764	-12.82%	5,961
York County	749	51.91%	667	46.22%	27	1.87%	82	5.68%	1,443
Alexandria City	4,716	54.19%	3,899	44.81%	87	1.00%	817	9.39%	8,702
Bristol City	1,129	64.26%	626	35.63%	2	0.11%	503	28.63%	1,757
Buena Vista City	406	57.18%	295	41.55%	9	1.27%	111	15.63%	710
Charlottesville City	1,971	53.11%	1,731	46.65%	9	0.24%	240	6.47%	3,711
Clifton Forge City	761	51.25%	719	48.42%	5	0.34%	42	2.83%	1,485
Colonial Heights City	714	68.13%	325	31.01%	9	0.86%	389	37.12%	1,048
Covington City	884	47.15%	985	52.53%	6	0.32%	-101	-5.39%	1,875
Danville City	3,570	69.97%	1,484	29.09%	48	0.94%	2,086	40.89%	5,102
Falls Church City	597	41.49%	809	56.22%	33	2.29%	-212	-14.73%	1,439
Fredericksburg City	1,016	60.87%	646	38.71%	7	0.42%	370	22.17%	1,669
Hampton City	2,905	50.42%	2,808	48.73%	49	0.85%	97	1.68%	5,762
Harrisonburg City	1,380	60.71%	869	38.23%	24	1.06%	511	22.48%	2,273
Hopewell City	1,130	56.27%	866	43.13%	12	0.60%	264	13.15%	2,008
Lynchburg City	3,381	61.07%	2,138	38.62%	17	0.31%	1,243	22.45%	5,536
Martinsville City	1,568	52.08%	1,424	47.29%	19	0.63%	144	4.78%	3,011
Newport News City	2,264	56.29%	1,721	42.79%	37	0.92%	543	13.50%	4,022
Norfolk City	7,181	46.80%	8,075	52.62%	89	0.58%	-894	-5.83%	15,345
Petersburg City	2,225	70.46%	903	28.59%	30	0.95%	1,322	41.86%	3,158
Portsmouth City	4,397	61.57%	2,672	37.41%	73	1.02%	1,725	24.15%	7,142
Radford City	736	27.44%	1,939	72.30%	7	0.26%	-1,203	-44.85%	2,682
Richmond City	16,409	54.33%	13,278	43.96%	517	1.71%	3,131	10.37%	30,204
Roanoke City	6,469	40.32%	9,538	59.44%	39	0.24%	-3,069	-19.13%	16,046
South Norfolk City	1,315	57.65%	923	40.46%	43	1.89%	392	17.19%	2,281
Staunton City	1,405	48.50%	1,482	51.16%	10	0.35%	-77	-2.66%	2,897
Suffolk City	1,018	59.53%	681	39.82%	11	0.64%	337	19.71%	1,710
Virginia Beach City	847	58.74%	593	41.12%	2	0.14%	254	17.61%	1,442
Warwick City	1,631	48.15%	1,723	50.87%	33	0.97%	-92	-2.72%	3,387
Waynesboro City	916	48.01%	980	51.36%	12	0.63%	-64	-3.35%	1,908
Winchester City	1,758	80.02%	434	19.75%	5	0.23%	1,324	60.26%	2,197
Totals	226,998	54.83%	183,328	44.28%	3,680	0.89%	43,670	10.55%	414,006

Counties and independent cities that flipped from Republican to Democratic

- Buchanan

Counties and independent cities that flipped from Democratic to Republican

- Alleghany
- Botetourt
- Arlington
- Bland
- Fairfax
- Giles
- Henrico
- James City
- Lee
- Montgomery
- Pulaski
- Roanoke
- Smyth
- Shenadoah
- Stafford
- Warwick
- Wythe
- Covington (independent city)
- Falls Church (independent city)
- Fredericksburg (independent city)
- Norfolk (independent city)
- Radford (independent city)
- Roanoke (independent city)
- Staunton (independent city)
- Warwick (independent city)
- Waynesboro (independent city)

== Analysis ==
No polls were taken despite the expectations of Republican gains related to the previous year's presidential election. However, in a record gubernatorial vote — though still less than two-thirds that polled at the previous year's presidential election – Stanley won comfortably by just over ten percentage points. This was nonetheless the best Republican gubernatorial performance in Virginia since 1885 when most blacks and poor whites remained enfranchised.

As of 2021, this is the last time that the city of Norfolk voted Republican for Governor.
