= Electoral history of Lester Maddox =

List of elections featuring Lester Maddox as a candidate

Electoral history of Lester Maddox, 75th Governor of Georgia (1967–1971), seventh Lieutenant Governor of Georgia (1971–1975) and 1976 American Independent Party presidential nominee

Democratic primary for Lieutenant Governor of Georgia, 1962:

- Peter Zack Geer — 187,770 (23.90%)
- Lester Maddox — 138,065 (17.58%)
- Peyton S. Hawes — 110,420 (14.06%)
- Culver Kidd — 108,601 (13.83%)
- Ed Wilson — 84,157 (10.71%)
- John E. Sheffield, Jr. — 55,020 (7.00%)
- Winston Burdine — 49,418 (6.29%)
- Spence M. Grayson — 32,900 (4.19%)
- Edmond Barfield — 19,169 (2.44%)

Geer then went to win a runoff

Democratic primary for Governor of Georgia, 1966

- Ellis Arnall — 231,480 (29.38%)
- Lester Maddox — 185,672 (23.56%)
- Jimmy Carter — 164,562 (20.89%)
- James H. Gray — 152,973 (19.41%)
- Garland T. Byrd — 39,994 (5.08%)
- Hole O'Kelley — 13,271 (1.68%)

Democratic primary runoff for Governor of Georgia, 1966:

- Lester Maddox — 443,055 (54.29%)
- Ellis Arnall — 373,004 (45.71%)

Georgia gubernatorial election, 1966:

- Bo Callaway (R) — 453,665 (47.38%)
- Lester Maddox (D) — 450,626 (47.06%)
- Ellis Arnall (D) (write-in) — 51,947 (5.43%)
- Scattering — 1,333 (0.14%)

Since no candidate received more than 50% of votes cast, Maddox was selected over Callaway by state legislature

Democratic primary for Lieutenant Governor of Georgia, 1970:

- Lester Maddox — 397,424 (51.36%)
- George T. Smith (inc.) — 253,738 (32.79%)
- Charlie Jones — 81,613 (10.55%)
- D. F. Glover — 40,993 (5.30%)

Lieutenant Governor of Georgia, 1970:

- Lester Maddox (D) — 733,797 (73.59%)
- Frank G. Miller (R) — 263,415 (26.42%)

Democratic primary for Governor of Georgia, 1974:

- Lester Maddox — 310,384 (36.32%)
- George Busbee — 177,997 (20.83%)
- Bert Lance — 147,026 (17.20%)
- David Gambrell — 66,000 (7.72%)
- George T. Smith — 43,196 (5.05%)
- Harry Jackson — 42,121 (4.93%)
- Bobby Rowan — 31,696 (3.71%)
- Ronnie Thompson — 23,933 (2.80%)
- B. J. Parker — 4,650 (0.54%)
- Bud Herrin — 3,419 (0.40%)
- Thomas J. Irwin — 2,224 (0.26%)
- Jenning Thompson — 1,987 (0.23%)

Democratic primary runoff for Governor of Georgia, 1974:

- George Busbee — 551,106 (59.86%)
- Lester Maddox — 369,608 (40.14%)

American Independent Party presidential convention, 1976:

- Lester Maddox — 177 (52.21%)
- Robert J. Morris — 80 (23.60%)
- John Rarick — 80 (23.60%)
- Others — 3 (0.89%)

1976 United States presidential election:

- Jimmy Carter/Walter Mondale (D) — 40,831,881 (50.1%) and 297 electoral votes (23 states and D.C. carried)
- Gerald Ford/Bob Dole (R) — 39,148,634 (48.0%) and 240 electoral votes (27 states carried)
- Ronald Reagan/Bob Dole (R) — 1 electoral vote (faithless elector)
- Eugene McCarthy (Independent) — 740,460 (0.9%)
- Roger MacBride/David Bergland (Libertarian) — 172,553 (0.2%)
- Lester Maddox/William Dyke (American Independent) — 170,274 (0.2%)
- Thomas J. Anderson/Rufus Shackelford (American) — 158,271 (0.2%)
- Peter Camejo/Willie Mae Reid (Socialist Workers) — 90,986 (0.1%)

Democratic primary for Governor of Georgia, 1990:

- Zell Miller — 434,405 (41.28%)
- Andrew Young — 303,159 (28.81%)
- Roy Barnes — 219,136 (20.82%)
- Lauren McDonald — 64,212 (6.10%)
- Lester Maddox — 31,403 (2.98%)

== See also ==
Electoral history of Jimmy Carter
