= 1955 Andorran parliamentary election =

- 16 December 1955 (first round); 24 December 1955 (second round)
- 12 of the 24 seats in the General Council
Party	Vote %	Seats	+/–
Independents	100	12	0
This lists parties that won seats. See the complete results below.

Parliamentary elections were held in Andorra on 16 December 1955 to renew half of the members of the 24-seat General Council. In constituencies where no candidate won in the first round, a second round was held on 24 December.

== Electoral system ==
Half of the membership of the 24-seat General Council was renewed every two years. Each of the six parish had four seats, except Andorra la Vella, which was divided into two two-seat constituencies, Andorra and Les Escaldes. At each election each parish elected two members, except Andorra and Les Escaldes, which elected one.

In the two-seat constituencies voters could cast two votes. Although candidates ran on lists, in some parishes votes could split their two votes between candidates on different lists. The elections were held using the two-round system, with candidates requiring a majority of the valid vote to be elected in the first round.

Voting was limited to men over 25 with Andorran citizenship, and men who were married to a woman with Andorran citizenship and had at least one adult child. Candidates had to be at least 30 years old.

== Results ==
Constituency	Elected members	Elected in
Andorra la Vella	Esteve Armengol	First round
Canillo	Francesc Areny	First round
Canillo	Bonaventure Bonell	First round
Encamp	Serafí Reig	First round
Encamp	Roc Torres	First round
La Massana	Joan Fité	First round
La Massana	Joan Gilabert	First round
Les Escaldes	Adolf Alturé	Second round
Ordino	Manel Font	First round
Ordino	Pere Naudi	First round
Sant Julià de Lòria	Lluís Duró	First round
Sant Julià de Lòria	Julià Reig	First round
Source: La Vanguardia, La Vanguardia

== Aftermath ==
The elected members took the oath of office on 28 December prior to taking office on 1 January
