= 1952 United States elections =

- ← 1950 1951 1952 1953 1954 → Presidential election year
- Election day: November 4
- Incumbent president: ▌Harry S. Truman (D)
- Next Congress: 83rd

Presidential election
- Partisan control: Republican gain
- Popular vote margin: Republican +10.9%
- Electoral vote
- Dwight D. Eisenhower (R): 442
- Adlai Stevenson (D): 89
- 1952 presidential election results. Red denotes states won by Eisenhower, blue denotes states won by Stevenson. Numbers indicate the electoral votes won by each candidate.

Senate elections
- Overall control: Republican gain
- Seats contested: 35 of 96 seats (32 Class 1 seats + 4 special elections)
- Net seat change: Republican +2
- 1952 Senate results Democratic gain Democratic hold Republican gain Republican hold

House elections
- Overall control: Republican gain
- Seats contested: All 435 voting members
- Popular vote margin: Democratic +0.5%
- Net seat change: Republican +22

Gubernatorial elections
- Seats contested: 30
- Net seat change: Republican +5
- 1952 gubernatorial election results Democratic hold Republican gain Republican hold

Elections were held on November 4, 1952, during the Cold War and the Korean War. The General of the Army Dwight D. Eisenhower won the White House in a landslide over Democratic governor Adlai Stevenson of Illinois. Meanwhile, Republicans narrowly took control of both chambers of Congress, giving Republicans their first trifecta since the Great Depression. This is the last election until 2000 in which the Republicans held both chambers of Congress and the presidency at the same time. For the rest of the 20th century, the Republicans would often still win the presidency without full control of Congress.

Republican nominee Five-star general Dwight D. Eisenhower defeated Democratic governor Adlai Stevenson of Illinois. Eisenhower won the popular vote by eleven points, and carried every state outside the Southern United States. Eisenhower took the Republican nomination on the first ballot, defeating Ohio senator Robert A. Taft and California governor Earl Warren. After incumbent president Harry S. Truman declined to seek re-election, Stevenson won the Democratic nomination on the third ballot, defeating Tennessee senator Estes Kefauver, Georgia senator Richard Russell Jr., and former commerce secretary W. Averell Harriman. Eisenhower was the first professional soldier to be elected president since Ulysses S. Grant.

The Republicans gained twenty-two seats in the U.S. House of Representatives, gaining a majority over the Democrats. The House elections took place after the 1950 United States census and the subsequent congressional re-apportionment. The Republicans also became the majority in the U.S. Senate, gaining two seats.

The longevity of Democratic rule of the White House and the unpopularity of President Truman and the war in Korea are credited for the Republican sweep.

As of 2024, this marked the third and final time in American history where one party flipped the White House and both chambers of Congress in a single election, along with 1800 and 1840. This would also be the last time the Republicans won unified control of Congress until 1994. (Note: The Republicans won the Senate majority in 1980 and held it until 1987, but the Democrats retained the House majority during that period; they would not lose the House majority until 1994.) This was the first presidential election where the winning Republican had coattails in both houses of Congress since 1928, and the second consecutive election with coattails in both houses. This is the last time the House changed hands in a presidential year, and the last time both houses simultaneously did so.

== See also ==
- 1952 United States presidential election
- 1952 United States House of Representatives elections
- 1952 United States Senate elections
- 1952 United States gubernatorial elections
