= Edwin R. Denney =

American politician (1904–1986)

Edwin Ray Denney (March 8, 1904 - June 22, 1986) was a Republican politician from Kentucky. He was born in Wayne County to Joseph Ryan Denney and Hattie Lovelace. He graduated from the University of Kentucky College of Law in 1932 and practiced law in Lexington and Mount Sterling. Denney served as minority floor leader in the Kentucky House of Representatives as a representative from Rockcastle County before serving as a Circuit Judge from 1946 to 1947 and as United States Attorney for the Eastern District of Kentucky from 1953 to 1955. He resigned as U.S. District Attorney to seek the Republican nomination for Governor of Kentucky in the 1955 election, which he received. Hoping to exploit divisions in the Democratic Party from its hotly contested primary that year, Denney campaigned on a progressive platform and attacked the character of his opponent, former Democratic governor Happy Chandler. Denney lost the election with 322,671 votes (41.7%) to Chandler's 451,647 (58.3%). Chandler's victory margin of 129,000 votes was the largest landslide in a Kentucky gubernatorial election up to that time. Denney died on June 22, 1986, at the age of 82.

== External sources ==
- The Kentucky Encyclopedia

Party political offices
Preceded by Eugene Siler	Republican nominee for Governor of Kentucky; 1955	Succeeded by John M. Robsion Jr.
