= 1955 Liberian constitutional referendum =

A constitutional referendum was held in Liberia on 3 May 1955. The changes to the constitution would grant women in the Provinces the right to vote (other women had been granted the right to vote in a 1946 referendum), grant all women the right to be elected to Parliament, and remove the section detailing that the Chief Justice would oversee any impeachment of the President or Vice-President. The changes were approved by voters.

== Constitutional change ==
The proposed changes would be to Chapters I and II.

Section	Original text	New text
Chapter I article 11 section 2	When applied to Voters in the Provinces of the hinterland of the Republic, "possessing real estate" shall be construed to include possessing a hut on which he pays the hut tax.	When applied to Voters in the Provinces of the hinterland of the Republic, "possessing real estate" shall be construed to include possessing a hut on which he or she pays the hut tax
Chapter II article 2 section 2	No person shall be a representative who has not resided in the County or Province two whole years immediately previous to his election, and who shall not when elected be an inhabitant of the County or Province, and who does not own unencumbered real estate of not less value than one thousand dollars in the County in which he resides or who in the Provinces shall not own a hut in which he resides and for which he pays the hut tax, and who shall not have attained the age of twenty-three years.	No person shall be a representative who has not resided in the County or Province two whole years immediately previous to his or her election, and who shall not when elected be an inhabitant of the County or Province, and who does not own unencumbered real estate of not less value than one thousand dollars in the County in which he or she resides or who in the Provinces shall not own a hut in which he or she resides and for which he or she pays the hut tax, and who shall not have attained the age of twenty-three years.
Chapter II article 5 section 2	No person shall be a Senator, who shall not have resided three whole years immediately previous to his election in the Republic of Liberia, and who shall not when elected, be an inhabitant of the county which he represents, and who not own unencumbered real estate of not less value than one thousand two hundred dollars in the County, and who shall not have attained the age of twenty-five years.	No person shall be a Senator, who shall not have resided three whole years immediately previous to his or her election in the Republic of Liberia, and who shall not when elected, be an inhabitant of the county which he or she represents, and who not own unencumbered real estate of not less value than one thousand two hundred dollars in the County, and who shall not have attained the age of twenty-five years.
Chapter III article 6 section 3	When either the President or Vice President is to be tried, the Chief Justice shall preside.	

A two-thirds majority in the vote was necessary for the changes to be approved.
