= 1955 Cleveland mayoral election =

Cleveland mayoral election, 1955
- November 8, 1955
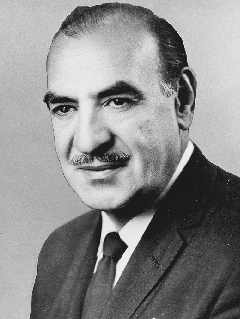
Nominee	Anthony J. Celebrezze
Party	Democratic
Popular vote	161,213
Percentage	100%
Mayor before election
Anthony J. Celebrezze
Democratic
Elected mayor
Anthony J. Celebrezze
Democratic

The Cleveland mayoral election of 1955 saw the re-election of Anthony J. Celebrezze. Mayor Celebrezze ran unopposed in the general election by virtue of having captured a majority of votes in the primary election, under the laws of the city charter.

== General election ==
1955 Cleveland mayoral election (general election)
Party	Candidate	Votes	%
Democratic	Anthony J. Celebrezze (incumbent)	161,213	100%
