= Alex Clark (politician) =

American politician

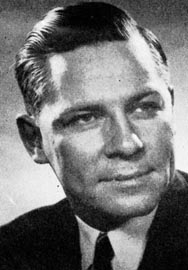
- Indiana, Indiana, Mayor Alex Clark, 1949.

39th Mayor of Indianapolis
- In office January 1, 1952 – January 1, 1956
- Preceded by: Christian J. Emhardt
- Succeeded by: Philip L. Bayt Jr.

Personal details
- Born: March 22, 1916 Indianapolis, Indianapolis
- Died: February 14, 1991 (aged 74) Argentina
- Party: Republican
- Education: Depauw University, Indiana University Law School

Alex M. Clark (March 22, 1916 – February 14, 1991) was an American politician. He became the youngest mayor of Indianapolis in 1951. He served one term and later ran again in 1967, losing in the primary to eventual winner Richard Lugar. He was a World War II veteran, and a former POW. In 1956 he and a number of friends formed the Wyoming Antelope Hunters Club in Indianapolis, which is still an active social club today. Prior to being mayor, Clark was a deputy prosecutor and judge in Marion County, Indiana.

Clark died in Argentina in 1991 of a head injury while on a cruise, returning from Antarctica in pursuit of his goal to visit every continent.

Political offices
Preceded by Christian J. Emhardt	Mayor of Indianapolis; 1952–1955	Succeeded by Philip L. Bayt, Jr.
