= 1955 United States House of Representatives elections =

There were two special elections to the United States House of Representatives in 1955 during the 84th United States Congress.

== List of elections ==
Elections are listed by date and district.

District	Incumbent			This race	
District	Member	Party	First elected	Results	Candidates
Florida 6	Dwight L. Rogers	Democratic	1944	Incumbent member-elect died December 1, 1954. New member elected January 11, 1955. Democratic hold.	▌ ✓ Paul Rogers (Democratic) 58.69%; ▌J. Herbert Burke (Republican) 41.31%
Michigan 15	John Dingell Sr.	Democratic	1932	Incumbent died September 19, 1955. Primary elections held November 8, 1855. New member elected December 13, 1955 to finish his father's term. Democratic hold.	▌ ✓ John Dingell Jr. (Democratic) 76.13%; ▌Thomas E. Brennan (Republican) 23.65%
