= 1955 Kentucky gubernatorial election =

- November 8, 1955
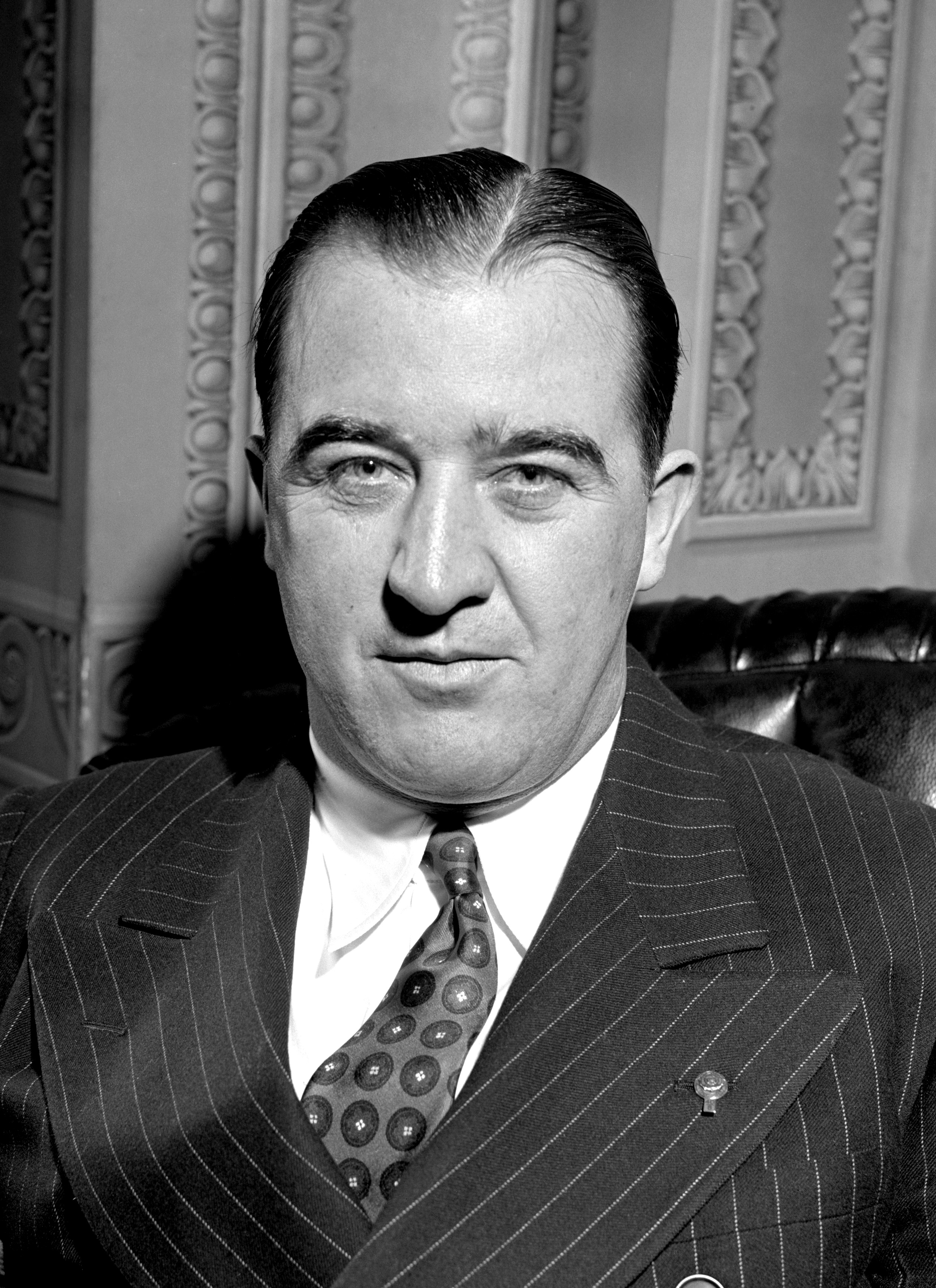

Nominee	Happy Chandler	Edwin R. Denney
Party	Democratic	Republican
Popular vote	451,647	322,671
Percentage	58.02%	41.45%
- Chandler: 50–60% 60–70% 70–80% 80–90% >90% Denney: 50–60% 60–70% 70–80%
Governor before election
Lawrence Wetherby
Democratic
Elected Governor
Happy Chandler
Democratic

The 1955 Kentucky gubernatorial election was held on November 8, 1955. Democratic nominee Happy Chandler defeated Republican nominee Edwin R. Denney with 58.02% of the vote.

== Primary elections ==
Primary elections were held on August 6, 1955.

=== Democratic primary ===
==== Candidates ====
- Happy Chandler, former United States Senator
- Bert Combs, Judge of the Kentucky Court of Appeals
- Jesse N. R. Cecil

==== Results ====
Primary results by county Chandler: 50%–60%; 60%–70%; 70%–80%; Combs: 40%–50%; 50%–60%; 60%–70%; 70%–80%

Democratic primary results
Party	Candidate	Votes	%
Democratic	Happy Chandler	259,875	51.40
Democratic	Bert Combs	241,754	47.82
Democratic	Jesse N. R. Cecil	3,965	0.78
Total votes		505,594	100.00

=== Republican primary ===
==== Candidates ====
- Edwin R. Denney, former United States Attorney for the Eastern District of Kentucky
- James L. Clay

==== Results ====
Primary results by county Denney: 50%–60%; 60%–70%; 70%–80%; 80%–90%; 90%–100%; Clay: 50%–60%

Republican primary results
Party	Candidate	Votes	%
Republican	Edwin R. Denney	77,097	79.23
Republican	James L. Clay	20,207	20.77
Total votes		97,304	100.00

== General election ==
=== Candidates ===
Major party candidates

- Happy Chandler, Democratic
- Edwin R. Denney, Republican

Other candidates

- Robert H. Garrison, Prohibition
- Jesse K. Lewis, Free Citizens

=== Results ===
1955 Kentucky gubernatorial election
Party	Candidate	Votes	%	±%
Democratic	A. B. Chandler	451,647	58.02	+3.42
Republican	Edwin R. Denney	322,671	41.45	−3.95
Prohibition	Robert H. Garrison	2,687	0.35	N/A
Free Citizens	Jesse K. Lewis	1,483	0.19	N/A
Total votes		778,488	100.0	N/A
Democratic hold				
