= 1955 United Kingdom local elections =

Elections to the municipal and county councils of England, Wales, Northern Ireland and Scotland were held in 1955.

== 1955 county council elections ==
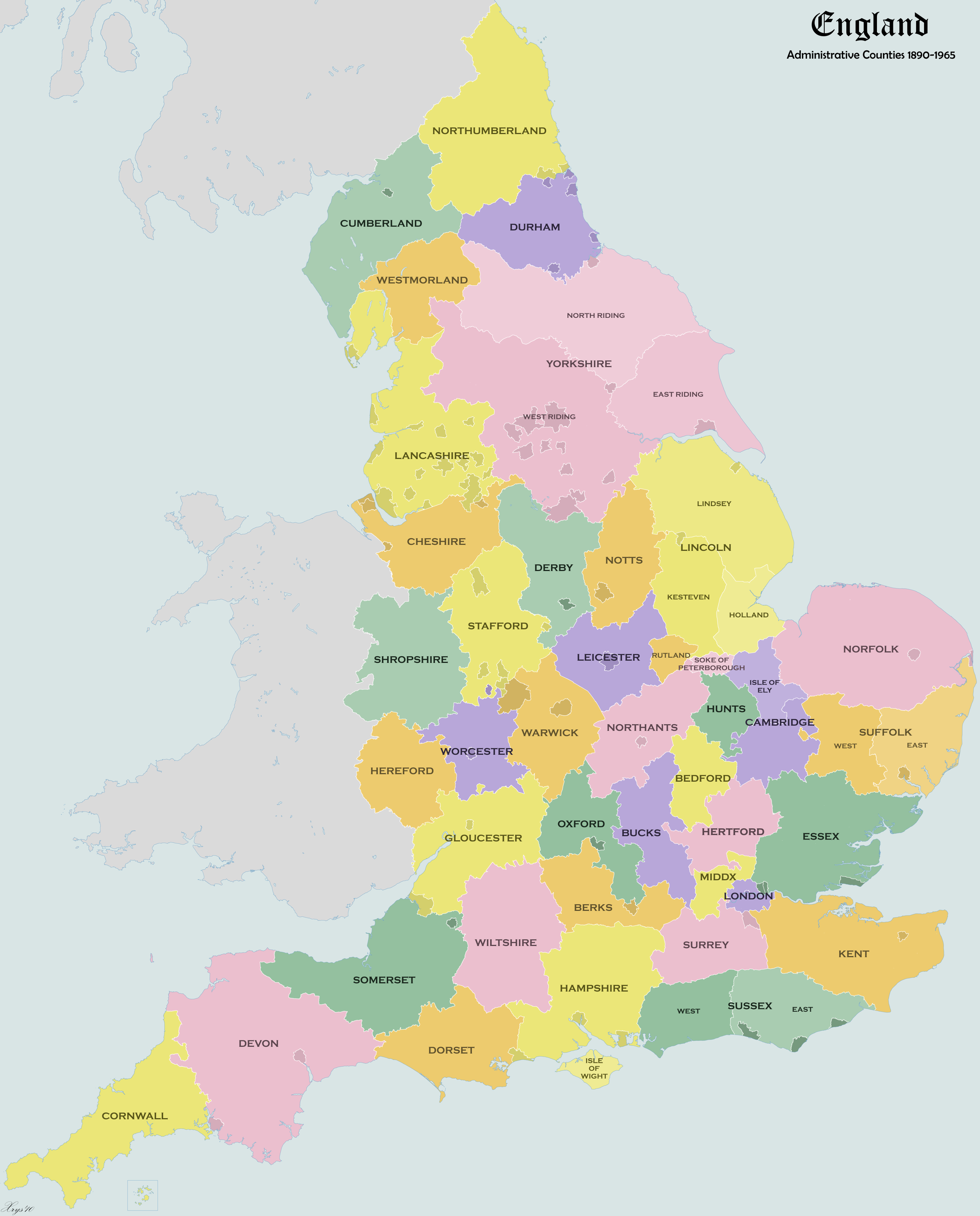
Map of County and Borough Councils in England.

=== English county councils ===
Council	Previous control	Result	Details
Bedfordshire	No overall control (Labour largest party)	No overall control (Conservatives largest party)	Conservatives 25 (Liberal-Conservatives 13, Conservatives 12), Independents 22, Labour 21, Liberal 1
Berkshire	No overall control	No overall control	Independent 26, Conservatives 25, Labour 7
Buckinghamshire	No overall control	No overall control	Independent 26 (-2), Conservative 21 (+4), Labour 14 (-2) Liberal 1
Cambridgeshire	No overall control	Independent	Independent 27 (+1), Conservatives 16, Labour 9 (-1)
Cheshire	Conservative	Conservative	Details
Cornwall	Independent	Independent	Election not run on political lines
Cumberland	No overall control - Anti-Labour administration	No overall control - Anti-Labour administration	Anti-Labour (Independents and Conservatives) 37 (+1), Labour 24 (-1)
Derbyshire	Labour	Labour	Details
Devon	Independent	Independent	Independents held control
Dorset	Independent	Independent	Independents held control
Durham	Labour	Labour	Details
East Suffolk	Independent	Independent	Independents held control
East Sussex	No overall control	Conservative	Conservative gain: previously held 26 of 52 seats.
Essex	Labour	Conservative	Details
Gloucestershire	No overall control	No overall control	Details
Hampshire	Independent	Independent	Independents held control
Herefordshire	Independent	Independent	Independent 49 (-1), Labour 5 (+1)
Hertfordshire	Conservative	Conservative	Details
Holland	Independent	Independent	Independents held control.
Huntingdonshire	Independent	Independent	Independents held control.
Isle of Ely	Independent	Independent	Independents held control
Isle of Wight	No overall control	No overall control	Conservatives 15, Labour 5, Independents 16
Kent	Conservative	Conservative	Details
Kesteven	Independent	Independent	Details
Lancashire	Labour	Conservative	Conservatives 71 (+21), Labour 46 (-18), Progressives and Independents 4 (-3)
Leicestershire	No overall control - Independent/Conservative administration	No overall control - Independent/Conservative administration	Conservatives and Independents 49 (+3), Labour 14 (-4), Liberals 1 (+1)
Lindsey	No overall control - Independent/Conservative administration	No overall control - Independent/Conservative administration	Independents and Conservatives 50 (+1), Labour 14 (-1)
London	Labour	Labour	Details
Middlesex	Conservative	Conservative	Details
Northamptonshire	No overall control	No overall control	Conservative 29, Labour 21, Independent 13, Liberal 4
Northumberland	Labour	Labour	Labour 37 (-3), Independents 32 (+2), Conservatives 3 (+1)
Nottinghamshire	Labour	Labour	Labour hold
Rutland	Independent	Independent	Independent 20 (-1), Labour 1 (+1)
Shropshire	Independent	Independent	Independents 45 (+1), Labour 8 (+1), Conservatives 6. Two new electoral divisions.
Soke of Peterborough	Conservative	Conservative	Details
Somerset	Independent	Independent	Independents held control
Staffordshire	Labour	No overall control	Details
Surrey	Conservative	Conservative	Details
Warwickshire	No overall control	No overall control	Conservative 31, Labour 15, Independents 17
West Suffolk	Independent	Independent	Independents held control
West Sussex	Independent	Independent	Independents 34 (-1), Conservatives 24, Labour 2 (+1)
Westmorland	Independent	Independent	Independents 44, Labour 2
Wiltshire	Independent	Independent	Independents held control
Worcestershire	No overall control	No overall control	Conservatives 33, Labour 19, Independents 15
Yorkshire East Riding	Independent	Independent	Independents held control
Yorkshire North Riding	Independent	Independent	Independents 47 (+4), Labour 12 (-4), Conservatives 7
Yorkshire West Riding	Labour	No overall control	Details

=== Welsh county councils ===
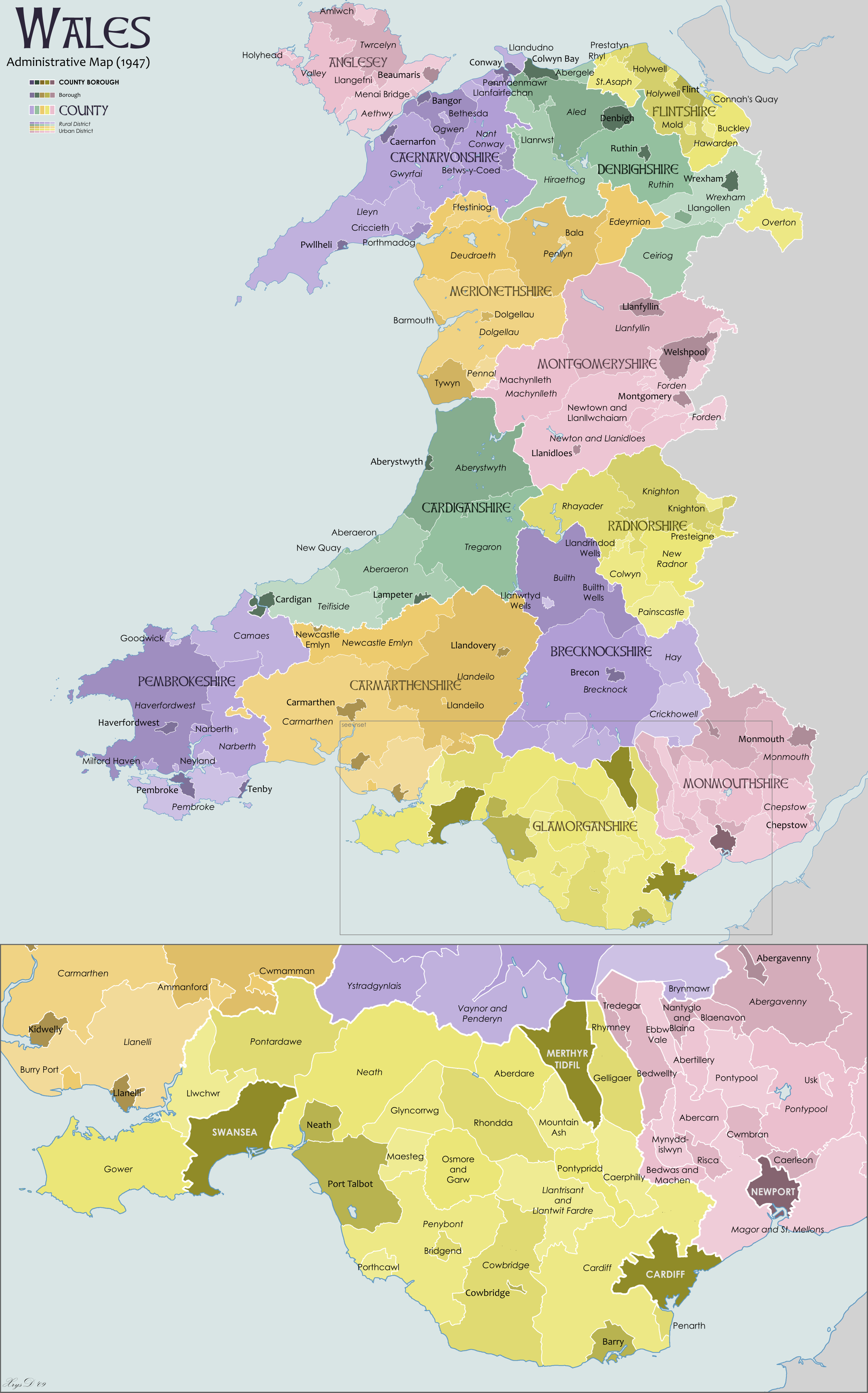
Map of Welsh local government divisions.

Council	Previous control	Result	Details
Anglesey	Independent	Independent	Election not run on political lines
Brecknockshire	No overall control - Anti-Labour administration	No overall control - Anti-Labour administration	Labour 20(-1), Liberal 14 (+2), Conservatives 10 (-1), Independents 10
Carnarvonshire	Independent	Independent	Election not run on political lines
Cardiganshire	Independent	Independent	Election not run on political lines
Carmarthenshire	Labour	No overall control	Details
Denbighshire	Independent	Independent	Independents 39, Labour 20, Conservative & National Liberal 5, Liberal 4, Miner 1
Flintshire	Independent	Independent	Independents held control
Glamorgan			Details
Merionethshire	Independent	Independent	Independents held control
Monmouthshire	Labour	Labour	Details
Montgomeryshire	Independent	Independent	Independents held control
Pembrokeshire	Independent	Independent	Independents held control
Radnorshire	Independent	Independent	Independents held control

=== Scottish county councils ===
Council	Previous control	Result	Details
Aberdeenshire			Details
Argyllshire			Details
Ayrshire	Labour	Labour	Details
Dunbartonshire		Moderates	Details
Fife	No overall control	Labour	Details
Midlothian	Labour	Labour	Details
Stirlingshire	Labour	Labour	Details

== 1955 Borough elections ==
Summary of results
The results for the boroughs were:

Party	Councillors			
Party	Gains	Losses	% Gains	% Losses
Conservative Party	346	36		
Labour Party	49	390		
Liberal Party	16	8		
Independents	75	50		
Communist Party of Great Britain	None	2	None	100%

=== English Boroughs ===
Elections to borough councils in England were as follows:

==== A ====
Council	Previous control	Result	Details
Abingdon	Independents	Independents	Independents 17 (-2), Labour 4 (+1), Conservatives 3 (+1)
Accrington	Labour Party	Labour Party	Labour 19 (-4), Conservatives 12 (+3), Liberals 2 (+1)
Acton	Labour Party	Labour Party	Labour 26 (-2), Conservatives 6 (+2)
Aldeburgh	Independents	Independents	Independents 16
Aldershot	Conservative Party	Conservative Party	Conservatives 24 (+2), Independents 6, Labour 2 (-2)
Altrincham	Conservative Party	Conservative Party	Conservatives 18, Independents 8, Labour 6
Andover	No overall control	No overall control	Labour 7, Independents 5, Conservatives 4
Appleby	Independents	Independents	Independents 16; No seats contested
Arundel	Independents	Independents	Independents 16
Ashton-under-Lyne	Labour Party	Labour Party	Labour 27 (-2), Conservatives 16 (+2), Liberals 1
Aylesbury	No overall control	No overall control	Labour 9 (-1), Independents 8, Conservatives 7 (+1)

==== B ====
Council	Previous control	Result	Details
Bacup	No overall control	No overall control	Liberals 10 (-2), Labour 8 (+2), Conservatives 6
Banbury	Conservative Party	Conservative Party	Conservatives 16 (+2), Labour 5 (-2)
Barking	Labour Party	Labour Party	Labour 26 (-1), Conservatives 6 (+1)
Barnes	Conservative Party	Conservative Party	Conservatives 26 (+1), Labour 5 (-1), Independents 1
Barnsley (County Borough)	Labour Party	Labour Party	Labour 36 (-1), Citizens 4 (+1)
Barnstaple	Independents	Independents	Independents 18, Labour 6
Barrow-in-Furness (County Borough)	Labour Party	Labour Party	Labour 26, Conservatives 6
Basingstoke	Labour Party	Labour Party	Labour 9, Conservatives 5, Independents 1, 1 vacancy
Bath (County Borough)	Conservative Party	Conservative Party	Conservatives 30 (+1), Labour 17 (-1), Liberals 5, Independents 4
Batley	Labour Party	Labour Party	Labour 21 (+1), Independents 6 (-1), Conservatives 1
Bebington	Conservative Party	Conservative Party	Conservatives 30 (+1), Labour 9 (-1), Liberals 5, Independents 1
Beccles	Conservative Party	Conservative Party	Conservatives 11, Independents 4 (+1), Labour 1 (-1)
Beckenham	Conservative Party	Conservative Party	Conservatives 24 (+1), Independents 6, Labour 2 (-1)
Beddington and Wallington	Independents	Independents	Independents 27 (+2), Labour 1 (-2)
Bedford	Conservative Party	Conservative Party	Conservatives 18 (+1), Labour 8 (-1), Independents 1, 1 vacancy
Berwick-upon-Tweed	Independents	Independents	Independents 18 (+1), Labour 6 (-1)
Beverley	Independents	Independents	Independents 19 (-1), Labour 5 (+1)
Bewdley	Independents	Independents	Independents 12 (+1), Labour 0 (-1)
Bexhill	Conservative Party	Conservative Party	Conservatives 17, Labour 4, Independents 3
Bexley	Conservative Party	Conservative Party	Conservatives 21 (+1), Labour 9 (-1)
Bideford	Independents	Independents	Independents 15, Labour 1
Bilston	Labour Party	Labour Party	Labour 21 (-2), Conservatives 5 (+2)
Birkenhead (County Borough)	Labour Party	Labour Party	Labour 42 (-2), Conservatives 22 (+2)
Birmingham (County Borough)	Labour Party	Labour Party	Labour 81 (-11), Conservatives 70 (+11), Independents 1
Bishop's Castle	Independents	Independents	Independents 15, Labour 1
Blackburn (County Borough)	Labour Party	Labour Party	Labour 33 (-2), Conservatives 21 (+2), Liberals 1
Blackpool (County Borough)	Conservative Party	Conservative Party	Conservatives 37 (+3), Liberals 16 (-2), Labour 1 (+1)
Blandford Forum	Independents	Independents	Independents 15 (-1), Labour 1 (+1); All seats uncontested
Blyth	Labour Party	Labour Party	Labour 24 (-4), Independents 6 (+4)
Bodmin	Independents	Independents	Independents 16
Bolton (County Borough)	Labour Party	Conservative Party	Conservatives 49 (+9), Labour 41 (-9), Liberals 2
Bootle (County Borough)	Labour Party	Labour Party	Labour 35 (-5), Conservatives 21 (+5)
Boston	Conservative Party	Conservative Party	Conservatives 15 (+1), Labour 4, Liberals 5, Independents 4 (+1)
Bournemouth (County Borough)	Conservative Party	Conservative Party	Conservatives 51 (+1), Independents 6, Labour 3 (+1)
Brackley	Independents	Independents	Independents 16
Bradford (County Borough)	Labour Party	Labour Party	Labour 42 (-5), Conservatives 32 (+1), Liberals 6
Brentford and Chiswick	Conservative Party	Conservative Party	Conservatives 21 (+2), Labour 13 (-2), Ratepayers 1
Bridgnorth	Independents	Independents	Independents 12; Only 1 seat contested
Bridlington	Independents	Independents	Independents 24
Bridport	Independents	Independents	Independents 23, 1 vacancy No seats contested.
Brighouse	No overall control	No overall control (Anti-Labour Coalition)	Labour 13 (-1), Conservatives 13 (+1), Independents 2, Liberals 1
Brighton (County Borough)	Conservative Party	Conservative Party	Conservatives 51, Labour 22, Independents 3
Bristol (County Borough)	Labour Party	Labour Party	Labour 70, Independents 42
Bromley	Conservative Party	Conservative Party	Conservatives 19 (+1), Independents 7, Labour 2 (-1)
Buckingham	Independents	Independents	Independents 14, Labour 2
Burnley (County Borough)	Labour Party	Labour Party	Labour 29 (-3), Conservatives 16 (+4), Liberals 3 (-1)
Burton upon Trent (County Borough)	Labour Party	No overall control	Labour 15 (-1), Independents 13 (-1), Conservatives 4 (+2)
Bury (County Borough)	Conservative Party	Conservative Party	Conservatives 28 (+6), Labour 12 (-6), Liberals 3, Independents 1
Bury St Edmunds	Independents	Independents	Independents 13, Conservatives 9, Labour 2
Buxton	No overall control	No overall control	Independents 10, Labour 5 (+1), Conservatives 5 (-1)

==== C ====
Council	Previous control	Result	Details
Calne	Independents	Independents	Independents 12, Conservatives 2, Labour 2 No seats contested
Cambridge	Conservative Party	Conservative Party	Conservatives 36 (+2), Labour 11 (-2), Independents 9
Canterbury (County Borough)	Conservative Party	Conservative Party	Conservatives 15 (+2), Independents 9 No seats contested
Carlisle (County Borough)	Labour Party	Labour Party	Labour 20 (-1), Conservatives 17 (+1), Independents 1
Castleford	New borough	Labour Party	Labour 30, 10 aldermanic vacancies to be filled
Chatham	Conservative Party	Conservative Party	Conservatives 14, Labour 10
Chard	Labour Party	Labour Party	Labour 10 (+1), Independents 6, Conservatives 0 (-1)
Chelmsford	No overall control	Conservative Party	Conservatives 23 (+2), Labour 9 (-2), Independents 5
Cheltenham	Conservative Party	Conservative Party	Conservatives 23 (+2), Labour 9 (+1), Independents 3; 3 new seats
Chester (County Borough)	Conservative Party	Conservative Party	Conservatives 30 (+1), Labour 21 (-1), Liberals 4, Independent Labour 1
Chesterfield	Labour Party	Labour Party	Labour 30 (-1), Independents 13 (+1), Conservatives 5
Chichester	Independents	Independents	Independents 15 (+2), Conservatives 7, Labour 2 (-2)
Chingford	Ratepayers' Association	Ratepayers' Association	Ratepayers 21 (+3), Labour 7 (-3)
Chippenham	No overall control	No overall control	Independents 11, Labour 7, Liberals 3, Conservatives 3
Chipping Norton	Conservative Party	Conservative Party	Conservatives 10 (+1), Labour 2 (-1), Independents 4
Chorley	Conservative Party	Conservative Party	Conservatives 18, Labour 114
Christchurch	Conservative Party	Conservative Party	Conservatives 10 (-2), Independents 9 (+2)
Cleethorpes	No overall control	No overall control	Conservatives 10 (+1), Independents 8, Liberals 2, Labour 0 (-1)
Clitheroe	Conservative Party	Conservative Party	Conservatives 11 (+2), Labour 5 (-2)
Colchester	No overall control	No overall control	Conservatives 18 (+2), Labour 16 (-2), Liberals 2
Colne	Labour Party	Labour Party	Labour 15 (-2), Conservatives 6 (+2), Liberals 2
Congleton	Conservative Party	Conservative Party	Conservatives 15, Labour 13
Coventry (County Borough)	Labour Party	Labour Party	Labour 41 (-5), Conservatives 22 (+5), Independents 1
Crewe	Labour Party	Labour Party	Labour 27 (-2), Conservatives 5 (+2)
Crosby	Conservative Party	Conservative Party	Conservatives 37, Labour 6, Independents 5
Croydon (County Borough)	Ratepayers' Association	Ratepayers' Association	Ratepayers 38 (+2), Labour 16 (-4), Independents 8, Conservatives 2 (+2)

==== D ====
Council	Previous control	Result	Details
Dagenham	Labour Party	Labour Party	Labour 18, Conservatives 3, 7 aldermen to be chosen. All new seats.
Darlington (County Borough)	No overall control	Independents	Independents 24 (+2), Labour 20 (-2)
Dartford	Labour Party	Labour Party	Labour 17 (-1), Independents 4, Conservatives 3 (+1)
Dartmouth	Independents	Independents	Independents 9 (-1), Conservatives 5, Liberals 2 (+1); No seats contested
Darwen	Conservative Party	Conservative Party	Conservatives 13 (+3), Labour 7 (-3), Independents 1
Daventry	Labour Party	Independents	Independents 8 (+3), Labour 7 (-3), Conservatives 1
Deal	Conservative Party	Conservative Party	Conservatives 20, Labour 6, Independents 5
Derby (County Borough)	Labour Party	Labour Party	Labour 42 (-1), Conservatives 22 (+2)
Devizes	Independents	Independents	Independents 18 (-2), Conservatives 5 (+2), Labour 1
Dewsbury (County Borough)	Labour Party	Labour Party	Labour 22 (-1), Municipal Association and Independents 14 (+1)
Doncaster (County Borough)	Labour Party	Labour Party	Labour 29 (-3), Independents 8 (+3), Conservatives 1
Dorchester	Independents	Independents	Independents 19, Labour 5
Dover	No overall control	Conservative Party	Conservatives 11 (+1), Labour 9 (-1), Independents 1
Droitwich	Independents	Independents	Independents 15 (-1), Residents Association 1 (+1)
Dudley (County Borough)	Labour Party	Conservative Party	Conservatives 23 (+5), Labour 20 (-6), Independents 1 (+1)
Dukinfield	Labour Party	Labour Party	Labour 15 (-1), Conservatives 5 (+1), Liberals 4
Dunstable	No overall control (Labour largest party)	No overall control (United Conservatives and Liberals largest party)	United Conservatives and Liberals 11 (+3), Independents 7, Labour 6 (-3)
Durham	Independents	Independents	Independents 23 (-1), Labour 5 (+1)

==== E ====
Council	Previous control	Result	Details
Ealing	Conservative Party	Conservative Party	Conservatives 40 (+4), Labour 20 (-4)
Eastbourne (County Borough)	Conservative Party	Conservative Party	Conservatives 28 (+1), Labour 8 (-1)
East Ham (County Borough)	Labour Party	Labour Party	Labour 39 (-1), Conservatives 1 (+1)
Eastleigh	Labour Party	Labour Party	Labour 20, Conservatives 5 (+1), Independents 3 (-1)
East Retford	Independents	Independents	Independents 17 (-1), Labour 5 (+1), Conservatives 2
Eccles	Labour Party	Labour Party	Labour 23 (-2), Conservatives 9 (+2)
Edmonton	Labour Party	Labour Party	Labour 24, Conservatives 8
Ellesmere Port	New Borough	No overall control	Labour 12, Conservatives 8, Independents 4 (8 aldermen to be chosen)
Enfield	New Borough	Labour Party	Labour 16, Conservatives 14, (10 aldermen to be chosen)
Epsom and Ewell	Residents Association	Residents Association	Residents 34, Conservatives 3 (+1), Labour 3 (-1)
Erith	Labour Party	Labour Party	Labour 21 (-1), Independents 3 (+1)
Evesham	Independents	Independents	Independents 14, Labour 1 Only one seat contested
Exeter (County Borough)	Conservative Party	Conservative Party	Conservatives 42 (+1), Labour 16, Liberals 6, Independents 4 (-1)
Eye	Independents	Independents	Independents 16

==== F ====
Council	Previous control	Result	Details
Falmouth	Independents	Independents	Independents 11, Labour 5 No contest
Farnworth	Labour Party	Labour Party	Labour 23, Conservatives 1
Faversham	Independents	Independents	Independents 9, Labour 4, Conservatives 3
Finchley	Conservative Party	Conservative Party	Conservatives 29, Labour 3
Fleetwood	No overall control	No overall control	Conservatives 8 (+1), Independents 7 (+1), Liberals 5, Labour 3 (-2)
Folkestone	Conservative Party	Conservative Party	Conservatives 24, Labour 10, Independents 2
Fowey	Independents	Independents	Independents 16; No contest

==== G ====
Council	Previous control	Result	Details
Gateshead (County Borough)	Labour Party	Labour Party	Labour 27 (-1), Independents 13 (+1)
Gillingham	Conservative Party	Conservative Party	Conservatives 20 (+2), Labour 8 (-2)
Glastonbury	No overall control	No overall control	Conservatives 8, Labour 7, Independents 1 No contest
Glossop	No overall control	No overall control	Labour 10, Liberals 7, Conservatives 5, Independents 2
Gloucester (County Borough)	No overall control	No overall control	Conservatives 17, Labour 15 (-1), Liberals 4 (+1), Independents 4
Godalming	No overall control	Conservative Party	Conservatives 14 (+2), Labour 6 (-2), Independents 4
Godmanchester	Independents	Independents	Independents 15, Labour 1 No contest
Goole	Labour Party	Independents	Independents 12 (+2), Labour 10 (-2)
Gosport	Conservative Party	Conservative Party	Conservatives 18 (+1), Independents 14 (+1), Labour 8 (-2)
Grantham	Labour Party	Labour Party	Labour 15 (-1), Conservatives 7 (+2), Independents 12 (-1)
Gravesend	Conservative Party	Conservative Party	Conservatives 25, Labour 6, Independents 1
Great Torrington	Independents	Independents	Independents 16; No contest
Great Yarmouth (County Borough)	No overall control	No overall control	Conservatives 23 (+1), Labour 23, Independents 1 (-1)
Grimsby (County Borough)	Labour Party	Labour Party	Labour 33 (-1), Conservatives 17 (+1), Liberals 3, Independents 3
Guildford	Independents	Independents	Independents 19, Labour 7, Conservatives 6 No contest

==== H ====
Council	Previous control	Result	Details
Halesowen	No overall control	No overall control	Independents 7 (-1), Conservatives 6 (+1), Labour 5 (+1), Liberals 2 (-1)
Halifax (County Borough)	No overall control	No overall control	Labour 21 (-4), Conservatives 20 (+4), Liberals 19
Harrogate	Conservative Party	Conservative Party	Conservatives 32, Labour 3, Independents 1
Harrow	Conservative Party	Conservative Party	Conservatives 43, Labour 17
Hartlepool	Labour Party	Labour Party	Labour 16, Conservatives 5 (-1), Independents 3 (+1)
Harwich	Independents	Independents	Independents 11, Labour 3, Conservatives 1, Liberals 1
Haslingden	No overall control (Conservative - Liberal administration)	No overall control (Conservative - Liberal administration)	Conservatives 10 (+1), Labour 7 (+1), Liberals 6 (-1), Independents 1 (-1)
Hastings (County Borough)	Conservative Party	Conservative Party	Conservatives 26, Labour 7 (-2), Liberals 2 Independents 5 (+2)
Hedon	Independents	Independents	Independents 12
Helston	Independents	Independents	Independents 16
Hemel Hempstead	No overall control	No overall control	Conservatives 12, Labour 9, Independents 3
Hendon	Conservative Party	Conservative Party	Conservatives 29, Labour 7
Henley-on-Thames	Independents	Independents	Independents 15, Labour 1
Hereford	No overall control	No overall control	Independents 9 (+1), Conservatives 8, Labour 7 (-1)
Hertford	Independents	Independents	Independents 12, Conservatives 8 (+2), Labour 0 (-2)
Heston and Isleworth	Conservative Party	Conservative Party	Conservatives 27 (+4), Labour 8 (-4), Independents 1
Heywood	No overall control	No overall control	Conservatives 15 (+2), Labour 12 (-2), Liberals 9
Higham Ferrers	Independents	Independents	Independents 9, Labour 5, Liberals 2
High Wycombe	No overall control	No overall control	Labour 16, Conservatives 11, Independents 5
Honiton	Independents	Independents	Independents 23, Labour 1
Hornsey	Conservative Party	Conservative Party	Conservatives 32, Labour 16
Hove	Conservative Party	Conservative Party	Conservatives 38 (+1), Labour 2 (-1)
Huddersfield (County Borough)	No overall control	No overall control	Liberals 28 (+1), Conservatives 17 (+2), Labour 15 (-3)
Hull (County Borough)	Labour Party	Labour Party	Labour 56 (-2), Conservatives 27 (-2), Independents 1
Huntingdon	Independents	Independents	Independents 11 (-1), Conservatives 4, Labour 1 (+1)
Hyde	Labour Party	Labour Party	Labour 12, Conservatives 11
Hythe	Conservative Party	Conservative Party	Conservatives 10, Labour 3, Independents 3

==== I ====
Council	Previous control	Result	Details
Ilford	Conservative Party	Conservative Party	Conservatives 31 (+1), Labour 13 (-1), Independents 2
Ilkeston	Labour Party	Labour Party	Labour 17 (-1), Independents 4, Conservatives 2 (+1), Liberals 1
Ipswich (County Borough)	Labour Party	No overall control	Conservatives 28 (+3), Labour 26 (-3), Liberals 2

==== J ====
Council	Previous control	Result	Details
Jarrow	Labour Party	Labour Party	Labour 22, Conservatives 6

==== K ====
Council	Previous control	Result	Details
Keighley	No overall control	No overall control	Conservatives 17, Labour 14, Liberals 7, Independents 2
Kendal	Independents	Independents	Independents 21, Labour 3
Kettering	Labour Party	Labour Party	Labour 21, Conservatives 11, Liberals 4
Kidderminster	Conservative Party	Conservative Party	Conservatives 17 (+1), Labour 11 (-1)
King's Lynn	Conservative Party	Conservative Party	Conservatives 16 (+2), Labour 8 (-1), Independents 0 (-1)
Kingston-upon Hull: see Hull
Kingston-upon-Thames	Conservative Party	Conservative Party	Conservatives 27, Independents 5

==== L ====
Council	Previous control	Result	Details
Lancaster	No overall control (Conservative-Independent administration)	No overall control (Conservative-Independent administration)	Conservatives 11 (+2), Labour 12 (-2), Independents 8, Liberals 1
Launceston	Independents	Independents	Independents 16; No Contest
Leamington Spa	Conservative Party	Conservative Party	Conservatives 25 (+1), Labour 1 (+1), Independents 1 (-2)
Leeds (County Borough)	Labour Party	Labour Party	Labour 68 (-3), Conservatives 44 (+3)
Leicester (County Borough)	Labour Party	Labour Party	Labour 37 (-5), Conservatives 27 (+5)
Leigh	Labour Party	Labour Party	Labour 23, Liberals 5, Conservatives 4
Leominster	No overall control	No overall control	Conservatives 7, Independents 4, Labour 3, Liberals 2
Lewes	Independents	Independents	Independents 17 (-1), Labour 5, Conservatives 1 (+1), 1 vacancy
Leyton	Labour Party	Labour Party	Labour 34, Conservatives 6
Lichfield	Independents	Independents	Independents 23, Labour 1
Lincoln (County Borough)	No overall control (Independent-Conservative administration)	No overall control (Independent-Conservative administration)	Independents 12, Labour 12 (-1), Conservatives 4 (+1)
Liskeard	Independents	Independents	Independents 16; No Contest
Liverpool (County Borough)	No overall control	No overall control	Conservatives 80 (+1), Labour 74 (-1), Protestants 3, Liberals 2, Independents 1
Lostwithiel	Independents	Independents	Independents 16
Loughborough	Labour Party	Labour Party	Labour 18, Conservatives 9, Independents 1
Louth	Independents	Independents	Independents 18, Vacant 6
Lowestoft	No overall control	No overall control	Labour 19 (+1), Conservatives 16, Liberals 2, Independents 3 (-1)
Ludlow	Independents	Independents	Independents 15, Conservatives 1 (+1), Labour 0 (-1)
Luton	Liberal-Conservatives	Liberal-Conservatives	Liberal-Conservatives 21 (+3), Labour 14 (-3), Independents 1
Lydd	Independents	Independents	Independents 16
Lyme Regis	Independents	Independents	Independents 16
Lymington	Independents	Independents	Independents 32 (+1), Conservatives 4 (-1)
Lytham St Annes	Conservative Party	Conservative Party	Conservatives 27, Independents 4, 1 vacancy

==== M ====
Council	Previous control	Result	Details
Macclesfield	Conservative Party	Conservative Party	Conservatives 33 (+2), Labour 14 (-1), Independents 1 (-1)
Maidenhead	Conservative Party	Conservative Party	Conservatives 17, Labour 1, Liberals 1, Independents 1
Maidstone	No overall control	Conservative Party	Conservatives 16 (+2), Labour 7 (-2), Independents 5
Malden and Coombe	Conservative Party	Conservative Party	Conservatives 30, Labour 5, 1 vacancy
Maldon	No overall control	No overall control	Labour 10, Independent - Conservatives 10
Malmesbury	Independents	Independents	Independents 16
Manchester (County Borough)	Labour Party	Labour Party	Labour 85 (-4), Conservatives 63 (+4), Liberals 4
Mansfield	Labour Party	Labour Party	Labour 18 (-2), Conservatives 6 (+2)
Margate	Conservative Party	Conservative Party	Conservatives 26 (+1), Independents 10, Labour 4 (-1)
Marlborough	Independents	Independents	Independents 13, Labour 2, Conservatives 1
Middlesbrough (County Borough)	Labour Party	Labour Party	Labour 41 (-1), Conservatives 20, Liberals 6 (+1), Independents 1
Middleton	Conservative Party	Conservative Party	Conservatives 14 (+2), Labour 5 (-2), Liberals 4, Independents 1
Mitcham	Labour Party	Labour Party	Labour 23 (-3), Conservatives 12 (+2), Independents 1 (+1)
Morecambe and Heysham	Conservative Party	Conservative Party	Conservatives 21, Independents 12 (-1), Labour 3 (+1)
Morley	Labour Party	Independents	Independents 23 (+2), Labour 21 (-2)
Morpeth	Independents	Independents	Independents 14, Labour 2
Mossley	Liberal Party	Liberal Party	Liberals 14 (-1), Conservatives 9 (+1), Labour 1

==== N ====
Council	Previous control	Result	Details
Nelson	Labour Party	Labour Party	Labour 26 (-3), Conservatives 5 (+3), Independents 1
Newark on Trent	No overall control	No overall control	Conservatives 10, Independents 8, Labour 6
Newbury	Independents	Independents	Independents 21, Conservatives 2, Labour 1
Newcastle-under-Lyme	Labour Party	Labour Party	Labour 44 (+1), Independents 12 (+1), Conservatives 3
Newcastle upon Tyne (County Borough)	Progressive Party	Progressive Party	Progressive Party 44 (+1), Labour 30 (-2), Conservatives 2 (-1)
Newport, Isle of Wight	Independents	Independents	Independents 16 (+1), Conservatives 6, Labour 2 (-1)
New Romney	Independents	Independents	Independents 16
New Windsor	Conservative Party	Conservative Party	Conservatives 39 (+5), Labour 17 (-5), Independents (elected by University) 12
Northampton (County Borough)	Labour Party	Conservative Party	Conservatives 25 (+3), Labour 22 (-3), Liberals 1
Norwich (County Borough)	Labour Party	Labour Party	Labour 37 (-2), Conservatives 23 (+2), Liberals 3, Independents 1
Nottingham (County Borough)	Labour Party	Labour Party	Conservatives 35 (+5), Labour 33 (-5)
Nuneaton	Labour Party	Labour Party	Labour 20 (-3), Conservatives 11 (+3), Independents 1

==== O ====
Council	Previous control	Result	Details
Okehampton	Independents	Independents	Independents 16
Oldbury	Labour Party	Labour Party	Labour 20 (-1), Conservatives 4, Independents 2, Liberals 2 (+1)
Oldham (County Borough)	Labour Party	Labour Party	Labour 32, Conservatives 18, 2 vacancies
Ossett	Independents	Independents	Independents 11 (+1), Labour 5 (-1)
Oswestry	Independents	Independents	Independents 15, Conservatives 4, Labour 3, Liberals 2
Oxford (County Borough)	Conservative Party	Conservative Party	Conservatives 39, Labour 17, Independents (elected by university of Oxford) 12

==== P ====
Council	Previous control	Result	Details
Penryn	Independents	Independents	Independents 12 (-1), Labour 4 (+1)
Penzance	Independents	Independents	Independents 27, Labour 5
Peterborough	Conservative Party	Conservative Party	Conservatives 19 (-1), Labour 17 (+1)
Plymouth (County Borough)	Labour Party	Labour Party	Labour 44 (-4), Conservatives 36 (+4)
Pontefract	Labour Party	Labour Party	Labour 14 (+1), Conservative-Liberals 5 (-1), Conservatives 4, Independents 1
Poole	Conservative Party	Conservative Party	Conservatives 26, Labour 13, Liberals 1
Portsmouth (County Borough)	Conservative Party	Conservative Party	Conservatives 48 (+4), Labour 14 (-4), Independents 2
Preston (County Borough)	Labour Party	Labour Party	Labour 35 (-4), Conservatives 11 (+4), Independents 2
Prestwich	Conservative Party	Conservative Party	Conservatives 14 (+1), Independents 8 (-1), Independent Progressives 2
Pudsey	Conservative Party	Conservative Party	Conservatives 16, Labour 7, Liberals 7, Independents 1, 1 vacancy

==== Q ====
Council	Previous control	Result	Details
Queenborough	No overall control	No overall control	Labour 5 (-1), Conservative 5 (+1), Independents 2, 4 vacancies

==== R ====
Council	Previous control	Result	Details
Radcliffe	Conservative Party	Conservative Party	Conservatives 26 (+5), Labour 9 (-5)
Ramsgate	No overall control	No overall control	Independents 14 (-1), Conservatives 10, Labour 8 (+1)
Rawtenstall	No overall control	Labour Party	Labour 12 (+1), Conservatives 10 (+2), Independents 1 (-1), Communists 0 (-2), 1 vacancy
Reading (County Borough)	Labour Party	Conservative Party	Conservatives 26 (+2), Labour 25 (-2), Independents 1
Redcar	Independents	Independents	Independents 15, Labour 8 (+1), Conservatives 1 (-1)
Reigate	No overall control	No overall control	Conservatives 12 (+1), Independents 9 (-1), Labour 7
Richmond, Surrey	Conservative Party	Conservative Party	Conservatives 30 (+1), Labour 8 (-1), Independents 2
Richmond, Yorkshire	Independents	Independents	Independents 16
Ripon	Conservative Party	Conservative Party	Conservatives 13, Independents 3
Rochdale (County Borough)	No overall control	No overall control	Labour 17 (-5), Liberal 16 (+2), Conservatives 13 (+3)
Rochester	Conservative Party	Conservative Party	Conservatives 19 (+1), Labour 7 (-1), Independents 2
Romford	Labour Party	Labour Party	Labour 21 (-2), Conservatives 13 (+2), Independents 2
Romsey	Conservative Party	Conservative Party	Conservatives 15, Labour 1
Rotherham (County Borough)	Labour Party	Labour Party	Labour 36, Independents 3, Conservatives 1
Rowley Regis	Labour Party	Labour Party	Labour 31 (+1) Independents 1 (-1)
Rugby	No overall control	No overall control	Conservatives 12, Labour 12 (-1), Independents 6, Liberals 2 (+1)
Ryde	Independents	Independents	Independents 17 (+1), Conservatives 10 (-1), Labour 1
Rye	Independents	Independents	Independents 15, Conservatives 1 No contests

==== S ====
Council	Previous control	Result	Details
Saffron Walden	No overall control	Independents	Independents 9 (+1), Conservatives 5 (-1), Labour 2
St Albans	Conservative Party	Conservative Party	Conservatives 21 (+3), Labour 3 (-2), Independents 0 (-1)
St Helens (County Borough)	Labour Party	Labour Party	Labour 33 (-1), Conservatives 7 (+1)
St Ives, Cornwall	Independents	Independents	Independents 16
St Ives, Huntingdonshire	Independents	Independents	Independents 16. No contest.
Sale	Conservative Party	Conservative Party	Conservatives 27 (+1), Labour 5 (-1)
Salford (County Borough)	Labour Party	Labour Party	Labour 52 (-4), Conservatives 12 (+4)
Salisbury (New Sarum)	Independents	Independents	Independents 24 (-1), Conservatives 8 (+2), Labour 1 (-1), Liberals 1
Saltash	Independents	Independents	Independents 15, Labour 1
Sandwich	Independents	Independents	Independents 14, Labour 2
Scarborough	Conservative Party	Conservative Party	Conservatives 18, Labour 3, Independents 2, Liberals 1
Scunthorpe	Labour Party	Labour Party	Labour 27, Conservatives 3, Independents 2
Shaftesbury	Independents	Independents	Independents 16
Sheffield (County Borough)	Labour Party	Labour Party	Labour 71 (-2), Conservative-Liberals 29 (+2)
Shrewsbury	No overall control	No overall control	Conservatives 22, Labour 13, Independents 7, Liberals 2
Slough	Labour Party	Labour Party	Labour 25 (1), Conservatives 15 (+1), Independents 2, Liberals 1
Smethwick (County Borough)	Labour Party	Labour Party	Labour 26 (-2), Conservatives 6 (+2)
Solihull	Independents	Independents	Independents 37, Conservatives 3
Southall	Labour Party	Labour Party	Labour 17 (-1), Conservatives 7 (+1)
Southampton (County Borough)	Labour Party	Labour Party	Labour 40 (-2), Conservatives 31 (+2), Independents 1
Southend-on-Sea (County Borough)	Conservative Party	Conservative Party	Conservatives 45 (+1), Labour 14 (-1), Independents 2
Southgate	Independents	Independents	Independents 18, Conservatives 10
South Molton	Independents	Independents	Independents 16
Southport (County Borough)	Conservative Party	Conservative Party	Conservatives 50 (+1), Liberals 7, Labour 3 (-1)
South Shields (County Borough)	Labour Party	Labour Party	Labour 40, Progressive Party 19, 1 vacancy
Southwold	Independents	Independents	Independents 16
Spenborough	New borough	No overall control	Independents 17, Conservative & National Liberals 10, Labour 10, Conservatives 2, Liberals 1.
Stafford	Labour Party	Labour Party	Labour 19 (-2), Independents 13 (+2), Conservatives 2
Stalybridge	Conservative Party	Conservative Party	Conservatives 17 (+1), Labour 15 (-1)
Stamford	Conservative Party	Conservative Party	Conservatives 15, Labour 5, Independents 2, Liberals 1
Stockport (County Borough)	Labour Party	Labour Party	Labour 39 (-1), Conservatives 33 (+1)
Stockton-on-Tees	Labour Party	Labour Party	Labour 28 (-1), Conservatives 14 (+1), Liberals 2
Stoke-on-Trent (County Borough)	Labour Party	Labour Party	Labour 78, Conservatives 9, Independents 9. New wards - increase from 84 to 96 members. Previous council: Labour 74, Conservatives 3, Independents 7.
Stourbridge	No overall control - Conservative Party / Independent coalition	No overall control - Conservative Party / Independent coalition	Conservatives & Independents 15, Labour 9
Stratford-upon-Avon	Independents	Independents	Independents 25, Labour 3
Stretford	Conservative Party	Conservative Party	Conservatives 22 (+2), Labour 10 (-2)
Sudbury	Independents	Independents	Independents 14 (-1), Labour 2 (+1)
Sunderland (County Borough)	Labour Party	Labour Party	Labour 50 (-2), Conservatives 16 (+2), Independents 6
Surbiton	Conservative Party	Conservative Party	Conservatives 27 (+1), Labour 7 (-1), Independents 2
Sutton and Cheam	Conservative Party	Conservative Party	Conservatives 33, Labour 3
Sutton Coldfield	Conservative Party	Conservative Party	Conservatives 19, Independents and Ratepayers 9
Swindon	Labour Party	Labour Party	Labour 25 (-1), Independents 19 (+1), Conservatives 2, 2 vacancies
Swinton and Pendlebury	Labour Party	Labour Party	Labour 19, Conservatives 8 (+1), Independents 1 (-1)

==== T ====
Council	Previous control	Result	Details
Tamworth	Labour Party	Labour Party	Labour 17 (-1), Conservatives 9, Independents 7 (+1)
Taunton	No overall control	No overall control	Independents 10, Labour 8, Conservatives 6
Tenterden	Independents	Independents	Independents 15, Labour 1
Tewkesbury	No overall control	No overall control	Conservatives 8 (+1), Liberals 5, Labour 3 (-1)
Thetford	No overall control	No overall control	Conservatives 8, Independents 5, Labour 3
Thornaby-on-Tees	Labour Party	Labour Party	Labour 18, Conservatives 3, Independents 3
Tipton	Labour Party	Labour Party	Labour 13 (-2), Conservatives 6 (+2), Independents 2, 3 vacancies
Tiverton	Independents	Independents	Independents 20, Labour 4
Todmorden	No overall control	No overall control	Labour 10, Conservatives 7, Independents 7
Torquay	Conservative Party	Conservative Party	Conservatives 20 (+1), Independents 16, Labour 0 (-1)
Totnes	Independents	Independents	Independents 14, Labour 2
Tottenham	Labour Party	Labour Party	Labour 39 (-1), Conservatives 2 (+1), 3 vacancies
Truro	Independents	Independents	Independents 19 (-1), Labour 5 (+1)
Tunbridge Wells	Conservative Party	Conservative Party	Conservatives 23, Labour 7, Independents 2
Twickenham	Conservative Party	Conservative Party	Conservatives 42 (+3), Labour 2 (-3)
Tynemouth (County Borough)	Independents	Independents	Independents 27 (+1), Labour 9 (-1)

==== U ====
Council	Previous control	Result	Details
Uxbridge	New borough	No overall control - Conservative - Independent coalition	Conservatives and Independents 20, Labour 16

==== W ====
Council	Previous control	Result	Details
Wakefield (County Borough)	Labour Party	Labour Party	Labour 28 (-1), Conservatives 16 (+1)
Wallasey (County Borough)	Conservative Party	Conservative Party	Conservatives 36 (-1), Labour 19 (-1), Liberals 6 (+2), Independents 2, 1 vacancy
Wallingford	Independents	Independents	Independents 16; No contests
Wallsend	Labour Party	Labour Party	Labour 30, Independents 6
Walsall (County Borough)	Labour Party	No overall control - Independent/Conservative coalition	Independents/Conservatives 20 (+3), Labour 20 (-3)
Walthamstow	Labour Party	Labour Party	Labour 18, Conservatives 3, Independents 3
Wanstead and Woodford	Conservative Party	Conservative Party	Conservatives 20 (+1), Independents 10, Labour 2 (-1)
Wareham	Independents	Independents	Independents 12, Conservatives 3, Liberals 1 No contests
Warrington (County Borough)	Labour Party	Labour Party	Labour 27 (-2), Conservatives 9 (+2)
Warwick	Conservative Party	Conservative Party	Conservatives 14 (-2), Labour 6 (+1), Independents 2 (+1), Liberals 2
Watford	Conservative Party	Conservative Party	Conservatives 25 (+2), Labour 19 (-2)
Wednesbury	Labour Party	Labour Party	Labour 16 (-1), Conservatives 4 (+1)
Wells	Independents	Independents	Independents 14 (-1), Labour 2 (+1)
Wembley	Conservative Party	Conservative Party	Conservatives 42 (+3), Labour 6 (-3)
Wenlock	No overall control	No overall control	Independents 16, Labour 16
West Bromwich (County Borough)	Labour Party	Labour Party	Labour 35 (-2), Independents 6, Conservatives 3 (+2)
West Ham (County Borough)	Labour Party	Labour Party	Labour 64
West Hartlepool (County Borough)	Labour Party	Labour Party	Labour 18, Conservatives 14 (+1), Independents 0 (-1)
Weston-super-Mare	No overall control	No overall control	Conservatives 12, Independents 11 (+1), Labour 1 (-1)
Weymouth and Melcombe Regis	Conservative Party	No overall control	Conservatives 20 (-1), Labour 16 (+1), Independents 3, Liberals 1
Whitehaven	Labour Party	Labour Party	Labour 20 (-1), Conservatives 4 (+1)
Whitley Bay	Conservative Party	Conservative Party	Conservatives 23 (+1), Independents 5 (-1) Labour 4
Widnes	Labour Party	Labour Party	Labour 17 (-2), Conservatives 12 (+2), Independents 3
Wigan (County Borough)	Labour Party	Labour Party	Labour 48, Conservatives 8
Willesden	Labour Party	Labour Party	Labour 36, Conservatives 17
Wilton	Independents	Independents	Independents 13 (-1), Labour 3 (+1)
Wimbledon	Conservative Party	Conservative Party	Conservatives 25, Labour 7
Winchester	No overall control	Conservative Party	Conservatives 14 (+2), Independents 6 (-1), Labour 4 (-1)
Wisbech	Conservative Party	Conservative Party	Conservatives 20 (-3), Independents 6 (+1), Liberals 4, Labour 2 (+2)
Wokingham	No overall control	No overall control	Conservatives 12, Independents 10 (-1), Labour 2 (+1)
Wolverhampton (County Borough)	Labour Party	Labour Party	Labour 34 (-3), Conservatives 26 (+4), Ratepayers 0 (-1)
Wood Green	Labour Party	Labour Party	Labour 14 (-1), Conservatives 7 (+1), Independents 3
Woodstock	Independents	Independents	Independents 15, Labour 1
Worcester (County Borough)	Conservative Party	Conservative Party	Conservatives 27 (-3), Labour 11 (+3), Independents 1, Liberals 1
Workington	Labour Party	Labour Party	Labour 26, Independents 6 No contests
Worksop	Labour Party	Labour Party	Labour 13, Independents 8, Conservatives 3
Worthing	Conservative Party	Conservative Party	Conservatives 25 (-1), Independents 14 (+1)

==== Y ====
Yeovil	Independents	Independents	Independents 16, Labour 8
York (County Borough)	Labour Party	Conservative Party	Conservatives 26 (+4), Labour 23 (-4), Independents 2, 1 vacancy

=== Welsh Boroughs ===
The following were the results in the Welsh borough council elections:

Council	Previous control	Result	Details
Abergavenny	Conservative Party	Conservative Party	Conservatives 11, Labour 5, Independent 1
Aberystwyth	Independents	Independents	Independents 9 (+1), Labour 5 (-1)
Bangor	Independents	Independents	Independents 20 (-1), Liberals 6 (+1), Labour 2
Barry	Labour Party	Labour Party	Labour 19 (+1), Independents 9 (-1)
Beaumaris	Independents	Independents	Independents 16
Brecon	No overall control	No overall control	Labour 6, Conservatives 4, Liberals 3, Independents 3. All seats unopposed.
Caernarvon	Independents	Independents	Independents 19 (-1), Labour 5 (+1)
Cardiff (County Borough)	No overall control	No overall control	Conservatives 25, Labour 19 (-1), Ratepayers 8 (+1), Independents 2, Liberals 1. 1 vacancy.
Cardigan	Independents	Independents	Independents 16
Carmarthen	Independents	Independents	Independents 14, Labour 10
Colwyn Bay	Conservative Party	Conservative Party	Conservatives 19 (-1), Independents 6 (+1), Labour 3
Conway	Independents	Independents	Independents 18, Labour 2
Cowbridge	Independents	Independents	Independents 14, Conservatives 1, Labour 1
Denbigh	Independents	Independents	Independents 14, Labour 2
Flint	No overall control. Labour Minority administration	No overall control. Anti-Labour administration	Labour 11 (-1), Conservatives 8 (+1), Liberal 1, Independents 4
Haverfordwest	Independents	Independents	Independents 12, Labour 4
Kidwelly	Labour minority administration	Independents	Independents 9, Labour 7
Lampeter	Independents	Independents	Independents 16
Llandovery	Independents	Independents	Independents 16
Llanelly	Labour Party	Labour Party	Labour 19 (-1), Independents 4 (+1)
Llanfyllin	Independents	Independents	Independents 16
Llanidloes	Labour minority administration	Independents	Independents 9 (+1) Labour 7 (-1)
Merthyr Tydfil (County Borough)	Labour Party	Labour Party	Labour 32
Monmouth	No overall control	No overall control	Conservatives 7, Independents 5, Labour 4 All seats uncontested
Montgomery	Independents	Independents	Independents 8
Neath	Labour Party	Labour Party	Labour 14 (-1), Non Party Citizens' Guild 7 (+1)
Newport (County Borough)	Labour Party	Labour Party	Labour 24 (-4), Conservatives 14 (+4), Independents 2
Pembroke	Independents	Independents	Independents 22, Labour 2
Port Talbot	Labour Party	Labour Party	Labour 22, Independents 2
Pwllheli	Independents	Independents	Independents 16. All seats uncontested
Rhondda	New borough	Labour Party	Labour 32, Independent 1
Ruthin	Independents	Independents	Independents 16
Swansea (County Borough)	Labour Party	Labour Party	Labour 45, Independents 14, People's Party 1
Tenby	Independents	Independents	Independents 16
Welshpool	Independents	Independents	Independents 14, Labour 2
Wrexham	No overall control	No overall control	Independents 13, Labour 12, Liberals 7, Conservatives and National Liberals 4

== See also ==
- United Kingdom national and local elections
- United Kingdom by-election records
