= West Riding (disambiguation) =

West Riding most commonly refers to:

West Riding of Yorkshire, one of three former administrative counties making up Yorkshire in England.

West Riding may also refer to:

== Government ==
- West Riding County Council
- Eastern West Riding of Yorkshire (UK Parliament constituency)
- West Riding of Yorkshire, a UK Parliamentary constituency that existed from 1832 – 1865
- 1952 West Riding County Council election
- 1955 West Riding County Council election

== Military ==
- West Riding Artillery
- West Riding Heavy Battery, Royal Garrison Artillery
- West Riding Yeomanry –Two cavalry regiments formed in 1794, disbanded at the Peace of Amiens in 1802, consisting of:

- Southern Regiment of West Riding Yeomanry was reformed in 1803 and became the Yorkshire Dragoons in 1889.
- Northern Regiment of West Riding Yeomanry was reformed in 1802 and became the Yorkshire Hussars in 1819.

== Organizations & Other ==
- West Riding Automobile Company, a subsidiary of the Yorkshire (West Riding) Electric Tramways Company which began operating in 1922
- West Riding House, a 20 storey commercial building
- West Riding Limited, a named passenger train that began service in 1937
- Stanley Royd Hospital, earlier the West Riding Paupers Lunatic Asylum, a facility that operated from 1818 to 1995.

== Places ==
- West Riding of Lindsey, a former subdivision of Lincolnshire, England
- West Riding of County Cork in Ireland
- West Riding of County Galway in Ireland

== Sports ==
- West Riding County Amateur Football League
- West Riding County Women's Football League
- West Riding County Cup
- West Riding County Football Association
