= Horsfall baronets of Hayfield (1909) =

The Horsfall baronetcy, of Hayfield in the Parish of Kildwick in the West Riding of the County of York, is a title in the Baronetage of the United Kingdom. It was created on 27 November 1909 for John Horsfall. He was a worsted spinner and banker and also served as Chairman of the West Riding County Council.

== Horsfall baronets, of Hayfield (1909) ==
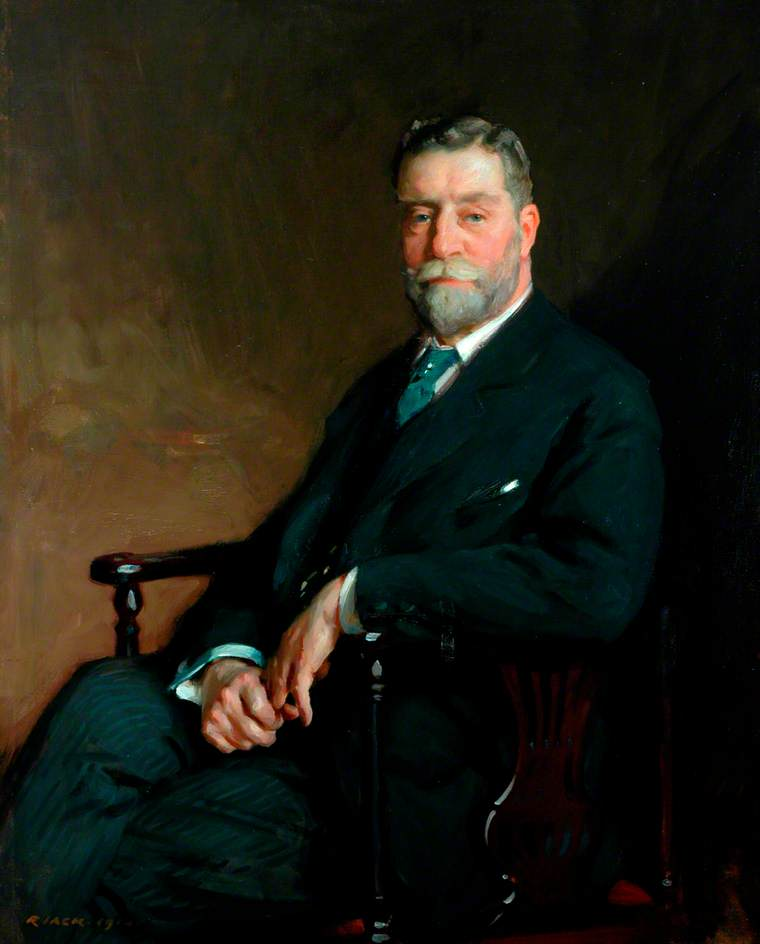
Portrait of John Cousin Horsfall, 1914

- Sir John Cousin Horsfall, 1st Baronet (1846–1920)
- Sir (John) Donald Horsfall, 2nd Baronet (1891–1975)
- Sir John Musgrave Horsfall, MC, JP, 3rd Baronet (1915–2005)
- Sir Edward John Wright Horsfall, 4th Baronet (born 1940)

The heir apparent is the present holder's son David Edward Horsfall (born 1966).

== Notes ==
Baronetage of the United Kingdom
| Preceded by Bell baronets | Horsfall baronets of Hayfield; 27 November 1909 | Succeeded by Kleinwort baronets |
