= 1955 Kesteven County Council election =

1955 UK local government election

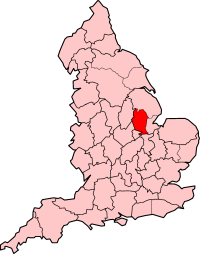
The administrative county of Kesteven (1889–1974), shown within England.

Elections to Kesteven County Council were held on Saturday, 2 April 1955. Kesteven was one of three divisions of the historic county of Lincolnshire in England; it consisted of the ancient wapentakes (or hundreds) of Aswardhurn, Aveland, Beltisloe, Boothby Graffoe, Flaxwell, Langoe, Loveden, Ness, and Winnibriggs and Threo. The Local Government Act 1888 established Kesteven as an administrative county, governed by a Council; elections were held every three years from 1889, until it was abolished by the Local Government Act 1972, which established Lincolnshire County Council in its place.

The County Council was divided into 60 electoral divisions. 45 independents and 15 Labour candidates were returned in the 1955 elections.

== Results by division ==
The following were the results of the election held on 2 April 1955:

Division	Candidate	Party	Votes	Retiring member?
Ancaster	Robert William Chadburn	Ind		r
Bassingham	W. D. G. Battersby			r
Bennington	Christopher Ullyatt	Lab		
Billingborough	The Rev. Leslie Ronald Swingler	Ind		r
Billinghay	Bertie Tomlinson	Ind		
Bourne no. 1	H. L. Hudson			r
Bourne no. 2	Dr G. A. F. Holloway			
Bracebridge	Herbert Edward Hough	Lab	453	
Bracebridge	Alice Rooke	Ind	416	r
Branston	W. E. Young			r
Bytham	J. H. Turner			r
Caythorpe	John William Oxby	Ind	443	r
Caythorpe	Mrs Dorothy Lily Pamblett	Ind	203	
Claypole	Brig. F. McCallum			r
Colsterworth	Charles Bulstridge Bailey	Ind	327	r
Colsterworth	Constance Lily Jacques	Ind	226	
Colsterworth	Gordon Suter	Lab	100	
Corby	John Hedley Lewis			r
Cranwell	John Edwin Mountain	Ind		r
Deeping St James	J. J. L. MacKirdy			
Dunston	J. Ireson			r
Gonerby and Barrowby	Philip Newton	Ind	371	
Gonerby and Barrowby	John Edward Snell	Lab	335	r
Grantham no. 1	A. E. Bellamy	Lab		r
Grantham no. 2	W. Bevan	Lab		r
Grantham no. 3	J. W. Harrison	Lab		r
Grantham no. 4	K. H. Jennings	Lab		r
Grantham no. 5	J. W. Browse			
Grantham no. 6	Mrs A. S. Chantry	Lab		r
Grantham no. 7	Arthur Syddall	Ind	440	r
Grantham no. 7	George Ernest Waltham	Lab	222	
Grantham no. 8	Mrs D. Shipman			r
Grantham no. 9	M. W. Patterson	Lab		r
Grantham no. 10	Cyril Welbourne	Lab		
Heckington	George Henry Dunmore	Ind		r
Helpringham	Sydney Percy King	Lab		r
Kyme	Ernest Leonard Lamyman	Ind		r
Leadenham	Col. William Reeve	Ind		
Market Deeping	F. R. Wade			r
Martin	J. F. Vickers			r
Metheringham	Frederick Cooling Townsend	Ind	439	r
Metheringham	Frederick Archie Burgon	Lab	332	
Morton	Jack Manton	Lab	311	
Morton	Alan Shaw	Ind	265	r
Navenby	Richard Baden Naylor	Ind		r
North Hykeham	Sydney Roe	Ind	567	r
North Hykeham	Frederick Albert Baker	Lab	401	
Osbournby	Mrs Nellie Robson	Ind		r
Ponton	Lt-Col. R. W. Newton			r
Rippingale	Harold Scarborough	Lab	304	
Rippingale	John Alexander Galletly	Ind	278	
Ropsley	Mrs J. P. Dixon			r
Ruskington	Benjamin Ebenezer Brighton	Ind		r
Scopwick	Horace Waudby	Ind		r
Skellingthorpe	R. C. Turner			r
Sleaford no. 1	Edgar Wilfred Elmore	Ind		r
Sleaford no. 2	Cecil John Barnes	Ind	502	r
Sleaford no. 2	John Mathieson Klingberg	Lab	458	
Sleaford no. 3	William Middleton	Ind		r
Stamford no. 1	Mrs G. M. Boyfield			r
Stamford no. 2	William Arthur James Darnes	Lab	459	
Stamford no. 2	Harry Skells	Ind	173	r
Stamford no. 3	J. H. W. Taylor			r
Stamford no. 4	P. K. Banks			r
Stamford no. 5	A. T. West	Lab		
Swinderby	P. W. Spray			r
Thurlby	G. A. Griffin			r
Uffington	The Rev. R. Burman			
Washingborough	H. A. Lillie			
Welby	Herbert Vian Clark	Ind	426	
Welby	Reginald Edgar Burnett	Lab	260	
Wilsford	Henry Pryor Kelway	Ind		
Woolsthorpe	FitzHerbert Wright			r
