= 1955 Ayrshire County Council election =

1955 Scottish local government election

The administrative county of Ayrshire (1889–1974), shown within northern Britain.

Elections to Ayrshire County Council were held on 10 May 1955. The Local Government (Scotland) Act 1889 established Ayrshire as an administrative county, governed by a County Council.

Following the election the council was composed of 25 Labourites, 16 Progressives/Moderates, and an Independent. The former council had composed 24 Labourites, 15 Progressives/Moderates, and an Independent. Due to the splitting of several larger divisions 3 new seats had to be filled.

== Aggregate results ==
Ayrshire County Council election, 1955 Contested Seats
Party	Seats	Gains	Losses	Net gain/loss	Seats %	Votes %	Votes	+/−
Labour	25							
Moderates	16							
Independent	1							

== Results by division ==
=== Beith East ===
Beith East
Party	Candidate	Votes	%	±%
Moderates	M. G. Boyd			
Labour	R. B. Neill	399		
Moderates gain from Labour		Swing		

=== Beith West ===
Beith West
Party	Candidate	Votes	%	±%
Independent Labour	R. McInnes	886		
Moderates	J. Beggs	449		
Moderates hold		Swing		

=== Coylton ===
Coylton
Party	Candidate	Votes	%	±%
Labour	J. Hodge	638		
Independent	W. Ferguson	304		
Moderates	J. Hamilton	124		
Labour hold		Swing		

=== West Kilbride North ===
West Kilbride North
Party	Candidate	Votes	%	±%
Moderates	L. Gale	420		
Labour	G. Goldie	203		
Moderates win (new seat)				
