= 1952 West Riding County Council election =

1952 UK local government election

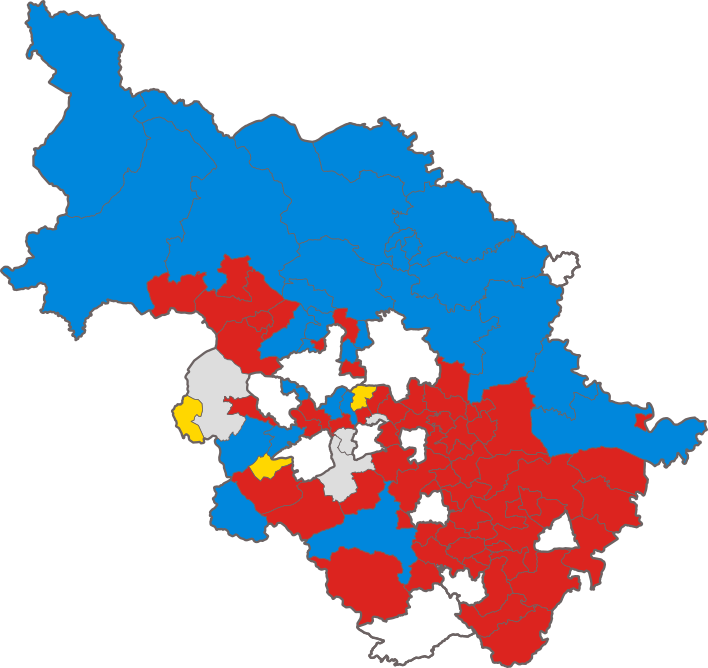
Map of the results of the election in each division

The 1952 West Riding County Council election was held on Saturday, 5 April 1952. The election took place in the administrative county of the West Riding of Yorkshire, which excluded the county boroughs of Barnsley, Bradford, Dewsbury, Doncaster, Halifax, Huddersfield, Leeds, Rotherham, Sheffield, Wakefield and York. The whole council of ninety-six members was up for election, with each county electoral division returning one councillor.

After the election the composition of the council was:

- Labour Party: 61
- Conservative Party: 28
- Independents: 4
- Liberal Party: 3

== Results by division ==
=== Adwick-le-Street ===
Adwick-le-Street
Party	Candidate	Votes	%	±%
Labour	J. W. Lane (Unopposed)	N/A		

=== Aireborough ===
Aireborough
Party	Candidate	Votes	%	±%
Labour	J. E. Bowes	4,739		
Conservative	R. Martin	3,595		

=== Askern ===
Askern
Party	Candidate	Votes	%	±%
Labour	M. Thompson (Unopposed)	N/A		

=== Aston ===
Aston
Party	Candidate	Votes	%	±%
Labour	W. Cloke	3,386		
Conservative	D. Marcroft	635		

=== Baildon ===
Baildon
Party	Candidate	Votes	%	±%
Conservative	P. Oates	2,902		
Labour	R. Lawrie	1,472		

=== Barnoldswick ===
Barnoldswick
Party	Candidate	Votes	%	±%
Labour	P. Carradice	4,216		
Conservative	H. Hogarth	2,995		

=== Barwick ===
Barwick
Party	Candidate	Votes	%	±%
Conservative	F. G. W. Lane Fox	3,315		
Labour	V. P. Richardson	1,679		

=== Batley No. 1 ===
Batley No. 1
Party	Candidate	Votes	%	±%
Labour	H. Westerby (Unopposed)	N/A		

=== Batley No. 2 ===
Batley No. 2
Party	Candidate	Votes	%	±%
Independent	Laura I. Fitzpatrick (Unopposed)	N/A		

=== Bentley ===
Bentley
Party	Candidate	Votes	%	±%
Labour	S. E. Keers (Unopposed)	N/A		

=== Birstall ===
Birstall
Party	Candidate	Votes	%	±%
Liberal	W. A. Ogilvy (Unopposed)	N/A		

=== Bingley ===
Bingley
Party	Candidate	Votes	%	±%
Conservative	H. Whitehead (Unopposed)	N/A		

=== Brighouse North ===
Brighouse North
Party	Candidate	Votes	%	±%
Labour	H. S. Wilkinson	3,634		
Conservative	J. W. Sutcliffe	2,548		

=== Brighouse South ===
Brighouse South
Party	Candidate	Votes	%	±%
Labour	M. Clamp	2,871		
Conservative	H. Postlethwaite	2,146		

=== Castleford No. 1 ===
Castleford No. 1
Party	Candidate	Votes	%	±%
Labour	M. Whittock (Unopposed)	N/A		

=== Castleford No. 2 ===
Castleford No. 2
Party	Candidate	Votes	%	±%
Labour	C. Dews (Unopposed)	N/A		

=== Colne Valley No. 1 ===
Colne Valley No. 1
Party	Candidate	Votes	%	±%
Liberal	A. E. Whiteley (Unopposed)	N/A		

=== Colne Valley No. 2 ===
Colne Valley No. 2
Party	Candidate	Votes	%	±%
Labour	Jessie Smith	3,418		
Conservative	G. Wimpenny	2,195		

=== Conisborough ===
Conisborough
Party	Candidate	Votes	%	±%
Labour	B. Roberts (Unopposed)	N/A		

=== Craven ===
Craven
Party	Candidate	Votes	%	±%
Conservative	A. Knowles-Fitton (Unopposed)	N/A		

=== Crofton ===
Crofton
Party	Candidate	Votes	%	±%
Labour	A. Dwyer (Unopposed)	N/A		

=== Cudworth ===
Cudworth
Party	Candidate	Votes	%	±%
Labour	J. Berry (Unopposed)	N/A		

=== Dalton ===
Dalton
Party	Candidate	Votes	%	±%
Labour	J. H. Townend	2,269		
Conservative	J. Brittain	571		

=== Darfield and Thurnscoe ===
Darfield and Thurnscoe
Party	Candidate	Votes	%	±%
Labour	H. Clarney	2,661		
Conservative	A. W. Bramham	650		

=== Darton ===
Darton
Party	Candidate	Votes	%	±%
Labour	C. Skelton	1,690		
Conservative	J. Johnson	628		
Independent	S. Homer	87		

=== Dearne ===
Dearne
Party	Candidate	Votes	%	±%
Labour	E. Davies	1,758		
Conservative	G. Roberts	268		

=== Denby Dale ===
Denby Dale
Party	Candidate	Votes	%	±%
Labour	J. Hibbert	1,840		
Independent	C. H. Moxon	1,202		

=== Ecclesfield ===
Ecclesfield
Party	Candidate	Votes	%	±%
Labour	J. W. Trickett	2,465		
Conservative	F. Scampton	786		

=== Edlington ===
Edlington
Party	Candidate	Votes	%	±%
Labour	J. Yorke (Unopposed)	N/A		

=== Elland ===
Elland
Party	Candidate	Votes	%	±%
Conservative	H. Cockroft (Unopposed)	N/A		

=== Featherstone ===
Featherstone
Party	Candidate	Votes	%	±%
Labour	E. Rowley (Unopposed)	N/A		

=== Garforth ===
Garforth
Party	Candidate	Votes	%	±%
Labour	R. B. Holt (Unopposed)	N/A		

=== Goole ===
Goole
Party	Candidate	Votes	%	±%
Labour	G. T. Medcalf	3,610		
Conservative	R. Jolly	2,592		

=== Harrogate No. 1 ===
Harrogate No. 1
Party	Candidate	Votes	%	±%
Conservative	H. J. Craven (Unopposed)	N/A		

=== Harrogate No. 2 ===
Harrogate No. 2
Party	Candidate	Votes	%	±%
Conservative	J. C. Hunter (Unopposed)	N/A		

=== Harrogate No. 3 ===
Harrogate No. 3
Party	Candidate	Votes	%	±%
Conservative	J. S. Tennant (Unopposed)	N/A		

=== Hatfield and Stainforth ===
Hatfield and Stainforth
Party	Candidate	Votes	%	±%
Labour	R. Kelley (Unopposed)	N/A		

=== Hebden Bridge ===
Hebden Bridge
Party	Candidate	Votes	%	±%
Independent	J. W. Sutcliffe	1,840		
Labour	P. Sowden	1,625		

=== Heckmondwike ===
Heckmondwike
Party	Candidate	Votes	%	±%
Conservative	C. Thackray	2,356		
Labour	A. S. Thornton	2,174		

=== Hemsworth ===
Hemsworth
Party	Candidate	Votes	%	±%
Labour	A. Bednall (Unopposed)	N/A		

=== Holmfirth ===
Holmfirth
Party	Candidate	Votes	%	±%
Labour	N. Denton (Unopposed)	N/A		

=== Horbury ===
Horbury
Party	Candidate	Votes	%	±%
Labour	H. Lloyd	3,031		
Independent	G. Senior	2,303		

=== Horsforth ===
Horsforth
Party	Candidate	Votes	%	±%
Conservative	H. E. Thackray (Unopposed)	N/A		

=== Hoyland ===
Hoyland
Party	Candidate	Votes	%	±%
Labour	A. E. Wilkinson (Unopposed)	N/A		

=== Ilkley ===
Ilkley
Party	Candidate	Votes	%	±%
Conservative	N. Geldard (Unopposed)	N/A		

=== Keighley No. 1 ===
Keighley No. 1
Party	Candidate	Votes	%	±%
Labour	F. McNulty	3,300		
Conservative	C. Berry	2,763		

=== Keighley No. 2 ===
Keighley No. 2
Party	Candidate	Votes	%	±%
Labour	G. S. Mason	2,390		
Liberal	W. E. Walton	2,351		
Independent	S. Unwin	544		

=== Keighley No. 3 ===
Keighley No. 3
Party	Candidate	Votes	%	±%
Labour	A. Harrison	2,824		
Conservative	A. W. Tack	2,368		

=== Kirkburton ===
Kirkburton
Party	Candidate	Votes	%	±%
Independent	G. T. Haigh	2,668		
Labour	J. A. Lawton	3,085		

=== Kiveton Park ===
Kiveton Park
Party	Candidate	Votes	%	±%
Labour	Alice Rastall	3,740		
Independent	E. K. P. C. Rigden	543		

=== Knaresborough ===
Knaresborough
Party	Candidate	Votes	%	±%
Conservative	A. C. Crowther			

=== Knottingley ===
Knottingley
Party	Candidate	Votes	%	±%
Labour	J. Blackburn	4,104		
Conservative	E. K. Thirkettle	2,248		

=== Maltby and Tickhill ===
Maltby and Tickhill
Party	Candidate	Votes	%	±%
Labour	T. Cheetham	2,627		
Conservative	C. Line	756		

=== Mexborough ===
Mexborough
Party	Candidate	Votes	%	±%
Labour	G. M. Hanson (Unopposed)	N/A		

=== Mirfield ===
Mirfield
Party	Candidate	Votes	%	±%
Independent	J. Hardy	2,648		
Labour	M. Day	2,455		

=== Morley No. 1 ===
Morley No. 1
Party	Candidate	Votes	%	±%
Labour	M. Barnes	2,330		
Independent	T. Barker	1,564		

=== Morley No. 2 ===
Morley No. 2
Party	Candidate	Votes	%	±%
Labour	H. Rankin	3,097		
Independent	J. Wilcock	1,616		

=== Normanton ===
Normanton
Party	Candidate	Votes	%	±%
Labour	W. E. Metcalfe (Unopposed)	N/A		

=== Ossett ===
Ossett
Party	Candidate	Votes	%	±%
Labour	W. M. Hyman	3,556		
Conservative	H. Smith	2,597		

=== Otley ===
Otley
Party	Candidate	Votes	%	±%
Conservative	H. Guy	3,247		
Labour	A. M. Pickering	2,402		

=== Pateley Bridge ===
Pateley Bridge
Party	Candidate	Votes	%	±%
Conservative	J. L. Barran (Unopposed)	N/A		

=== Penistone ===
Penistone
Party	Candidate	Votes	%	±%
Conservative	A. Goldthorpe	2,073		
Independent	S. Palmer	2,035		

=== Pontefract ===
Pontefract
Party	Candidate	Votes	%	±%
Labour	G. Wright	3,455		
Conservative	W. Storey	1,512		

=== Pudsey No. 1 ===
Pudsey No. 1
Party	Candidate	Votes	%	±%
Conservative	J. Fuller Smith (Unopposed)	N/A		

=== Pudsey No. 2 ===
Pudsey No. 2
Party	Candidate	Votes	%	±%
Labour	H. V. Waldegrave	2,290		
Conservative	J. O. Cowgill	2,245		
Liberal	W. C. Knowison	1,467		

=== Queensbury ===
Queensbury
Party	Candidate	Votes	%	±%
Conservative	M. E. McCreath	2,360		
Labour	P. Hemingway	2,035		

=== Rawmarsh ===
Rawmarsh
Party	Candidate	Votes	%	±%
Labour	J. E. Payne (unopposed)	N/A		

=== Ripon ===
Ripon
Party	Candidate	Votes	%	±%
Conservative	E. B. Eccles (unopposed)	N/A		

=== Ripponden ===
Ripponden
Party	Candidate	Votes	%	±%
Conservative	S. Stott			

=== Rossington ===
Rossington
Party	Candidate	Votes	%	±%
Labour	R. E. Hughes (unopposed)	N/A		

=== Rothwell ===
Rothwell
Party	Candidate	Votes	%	±%
Labour	W. H. Turner (unopposed)	N/A		

=== Saddleworth ===
Saddleworth
Party	Candidate	Votes	%	±%
Conservative	E. E. Smith	3,531		
Labour	F. G. Battye	3,115		

=== Sedbergh ===
Sedbergh
Party	Candidate	Votes	%	±%
Conservative	W. H. Illingworth (unopposed)	N/A		

=== Selby ===
Selby
Party	Candidate	Votes	%	±%
Conservative	C. E. Anson (unopposed)	N/A		

=== Settle ===
Settle
Party	Candidate	Votes	%	±%
Conservative	W. Knowles (unopposed)	N/A		

=== Silsden ===
Silsden
Party	Candidate	Votes	%	±%
Labour	R. A. D. Warren	2,988		
Conservative	N. Fortune	2,950		

=== Shipley East ===
Shipley East
Party	Candidate	Votes	%	±%
Labour	T. Wilcock	3,369		
Conservative	L. P. Warne	955		

=== Shipley West ===
Shipley West
Party	Candidate	Votes	%	±%
Conservative	G. Waddilove	3,754		
Labour	C. V. Barber	1,611		

=== Skipton ===
Skipton
Party	Candidate	Votes	%	±%
Labour	M. P. Banks	3,378		
Conservative	M. Mitchell	2,435		

=== Snaith ===
Snaith
Party	Candidate	Votes	%	±%
Conservative	J. Martinson	1,824		
Labour	J. Street	1,400		

=== South Elmsall ===
South Elmsall
Party	Candidate	Votes	%	±%
Labour	W. King (unopposed)	N/A		

=== South Kirkby ===
South Kirkby
Party	Candidate	Votes	%	±%
Labour	A. Flavell (unopposed)	N/A		

=== Sowerby Bridge ===
Sowerby Bridge
Party	Candidate	Votes	%	±%
Labour	F. Barker	2,212		
Independent	E. Cockroft	1,447		

=== Spenborough No. 1 ===
Spenborough No. 1
Party	Candidate	Votes	%	±%
Conservative	F. Morton	2,664		
Labour	F. Kirkman	2,441		

=== Spenborough No. 2 ===
Spenborough No. 2
Party	Candidate	Votes	%	±%
Labour	Dorothy Greenald	3,190		
Liberal	H. W. Edwards	2,892		

=== Stanley ===
Stanley
Party	Candidate	Votes	%	±%
Labour	J. E. Howe (unopposed)	N/A		

=== Stocksbridge ===
Stocksbridge
Party	Candidate	Votes	%	±%
Labour	A. Sweeney	2,121		
Conservative	Helen Green	1,919		

=== Swinton ===
Swinton
Party	Candidate	Votes	%	±%
Labour	M. Creighton (unopposed)	N/A		

=== Tadcaster ===
Tadcaster
Party	Candidate	Votes	%	±%
Conservative	D. W. Atkinson	2,630		
Labour	W. Tomlinson	1,590		

=== Thorne ===
Thorne
Party	Candidate	Votes	%	±%
Labour	G. H. Nicholson (unopposed)	N/A		

=== Todmorden ===
Todmorden
Party	Candidate	Votes	%	±%
Liberal	J. de Ville Mather (unopposed)	N/A		

=== Wath-on-Dearne ===
Wath-on-Dearne
Party	Candidate	Votes	%	±%
Labour	W. Cutts (unopposed)	N/A		

=== Wetherby ===
Wetherby
Party	Candidate	Votes	%	±%
Conservative	S. Porteous (unopposed)	N/A		

=== Whitwood ===
Whitwood
Party	Candidate	Votes	%	±%
Labour	E. Taylor (unopposed)	N/A		

=== Wombwell ===
Wombwell
Party	Candidate	Votes	%	±%
Labour	T. A. Newsome (unopposed)	N/A		

=== Worsborough ===
Worsborough
Party	Candidate	Votes	%	±%
Labour	C. W. Boland	3,062		
Conservative	K. S. Dickinson	659		
