= 1955 Durham County Council election =

1955 UK local government election

Elections to Durham County Council were held on in April 1955. The Labour party maintained their dominance, although their presence was reduced from 77 to 74 of the councils 88 councillors. All 29 Alderman remained Labour. Of the 74 Labour councillors returned, 48 were returned unopposed.

== Aggregate results ==
This section summarises the detailed results which are noted in the following sections.

This table summarises the result of the elections in all electoral divisions. 88 councillors were elected. Councillors are listed first, then aldermen, meaning that "74 + 29" means 74 Councillors and 29 Aldermen.

Durham County Council election, 1955
Party	Seats	Gains	Losses	Net gain/loss	Seats %	Votes %	Votes	+/−
Labour	74 + 29							
Other parties	14 + 0							
