= 1955 Midlothian County Council election =

1955 Scottish local government election

- May 10, 1955

16 of 39 landward seats 32 seats needed for a majority
| | First party | Second party | Third party |
|---|---|---|---|
| Party | Labour | Progressives | Communist |
| Seats won | 5 | 8 | 2 |
| Seats after | 44 | 15 | 2 |
| Seat change | ▼2 | ▼1 | ▲2 |
| Popular vote | 3,566 | 3,586 | 591 |
| Percentage | 43.12% | 43.36% | 7.15% |
| | Fourth party |
| Party | Independent |
| Seats won | 1 |
| Seats after | 1 (Note: The independent grouped with the Progressives) |
| Seat change | ▲1 |
| Popular vote | 527 |
| Percentage | 6.37% |

Elections to Midlothian County Council were held on 10 May 1955. Midlothian was one of the four divisions that made up the historic region of Lothian in Scotland. The Local Government (Scotland) Act 1889 established Midlothian as an administrative county, governed by a County Council.

The county was divided into 39 landward divisions, each of which returned one member. In 1955 there were contests in 16 of these. The other 23 members were elected from the burghs.

The election marked the first time Communists had been elected to the council, with both Communists defeating Labour. However, following the election, Labour still commanded a large majority on the council.

== Results by division ==
Addiewell
| Party | Candidate | Votes | % |
|---|---|---|---|
| Labour | Frank West | 336 | 72.10 |
| Progressives | A. C. Halliday | 130 | 27.90 |
| Majority | | 206 | |
| Turnout | | 466 | 48 |
| Labour hold | | | |

Bilston
| Party | Candidate | Votes | % |
|---|---|---|---|
| Progressives | Agnes B. R. Stanley | 318 | 69.74 |
| Labour | William Newbigging | 138 | 30.26 |
| Majority | | 180 | |
| Turnout | | 456 | 51 |
| Progressives hold | | | |

Borthwick and Temple
| Party | Candidate | Votes | % |
|---|---|---|---|
| Progressives | Thomas C. Garden | 328 | 59.96 |
| Labour | Daniel Cochrane (incumbent) | 219 | 40.04 |
| Majority | | 109 | |
| Turnout | | 547 | 51 |
| Progressives gain from Labour | | | |

Briech
| Party | Candidate | Votes | % |
|---|---|---|---|
| Communist | Alexander Grierson | 334 | 62.90 |
| Labour | A. Colleary | 164 | 30.89 |
| Independent | Rose Moore | 33 | 6.21 |
| Majority | | 170 | |
| Turnout | | 531 | 66 |
| Communist gain from Labour | | | |

Glencourse
| Party | Candidate | Votes | % |
|---|---|---|---|
| Progressives | M. I. H. Mackenzie-Inglis (incumbent) | 414 | 90.00 |
| Labour | John J. Hamilton | 46 | 10.00 |
| Majority | | 368 | |
| Turnout | | 460 | 52 |
| Progressives hold | | | |

Kirkhill
| Party | Candidate | Votes | % |
|---|---|---|---|
| Progressives | John Jardine (incumbent) | 505 | 86.62 |
| Labour | Robert McLachlan | 78 | 13.38 |
| Majority | | 427 | |
| Turnout | | 583 | 58 |
| Progressives hold | | | |

Kirknewton North
| Party | Candidate | Votes | % |
|---|---|---|---|
| Labour | James White | 287 | 58.33 |
| Progressives | William S. How | 205 | 41.67 |
| Majority | | 82 | |
| Turnout | | 492 | 46 |
| Labour gain from Progressives | | | |

Limefield and Parkhead
| Party | Candidate | Votes | % |
|---|---|---|---|
| Labour | William G. Rankine | 309 | 52.64 |
| Progressives | T. Fairley | 278 | 47.36 |
| Majority | | 31 | |
| Turnout | | 587 | 51 |
| Labour gain from Progressives | | | |

Melville
| Party | Candidate | Votes | % |
|---|---|---|---|
| Progressives | Edward M. P. Collett | 255 | 53.68 |
| Labour | Bernard Mackay | 220 | 43.32 |
| Majority | | 35 | |
| Turnout | | 475 | 50 |
| Progressives hold | | | |

Mid-Calder
| Party | Candidate | Votes | % |
|---|---|---|---|
| Labour | John Stoddard | 245 | 56.45 |
| Independent | John Mitchell | 189 | 43.55 |
| Majority | | 56 | |
| Turnout | | 434 | |
| Labour hold | | | |

Newbattle (2nd Division)
| Party | Candidate | Votes | % |
|---|---|---|---|
| Independent | Stuart B. Syme | 283 | 51.93 |
| Labour | Robert B. Pilmer | 207 | 37.89 |
| Independent | John McFarlane | 55 | 10.09 |
| Majority | | 76 | |
| Turnout | | 545 | |
| Independent gain from Labour | | | |

Newbridge
| Party | Candidate | Votes | % |
|---|---|---|---|
| Progressives | Richard R. Killick | 301 | 54.14 |
| Labour | William Cannon | 255 | 45.86 |
| Majority | | 46 | |
| Turnout | | 556 | 70 |
| Progressives hold | | | |

Polbeth
| Party | Candidate | Votes | % |
|---|---|---|---|
| Communist | James McArthur | 257 | 53.54 |
| Labour | Bernard Hampson (incumbent) | 223 | 46.46 |
| Majority | | 34 | |
| Turnout | | 480 | 49 |
| Communist gain from Labour | | | |

Polton and Rosslynlee
| Party | Candidate | Votes | % |
|---|---|---|---|
| Labour | Robert Anderson (incumbent) | 391 | 71.35 |
| Progressives | Frederick L. Johnston | 157 | 28.65 |
| Majority | | 234 | |
| Turnout | | 548 | 61 |
| Labour hold | | | |

Roslin
| Party | Candidate | Votes | % |
|---|---|---|---|
| Progressives | Alexander F. Noble (incumbent) | 350 | 54.43 |
| Labour | Patrick Tague | 293 | 45.57 |
| Majority | | 57 | |
| Turnout | | 643 | 68 |
| Progressives hold | | | |

West Calder
| Party | Candidate | Votes | % |
|---|---|---|---|
| Progressives | John Wardrop | 345 | 69.00 |
| Labour | A. McCallum | 155 | 31.00 |
| Majority | | 190 | |
| Turnout | | 500 | 53 |
| Progressives hold | | | |
