= West Riding County Council =

Former local authority in England

- Coat of arms

Type
- Type: County council

History
- Founded: 1 April 1889
- Disbanded: 31 March 1974

Motto
- Audi Consilium

Meeting place
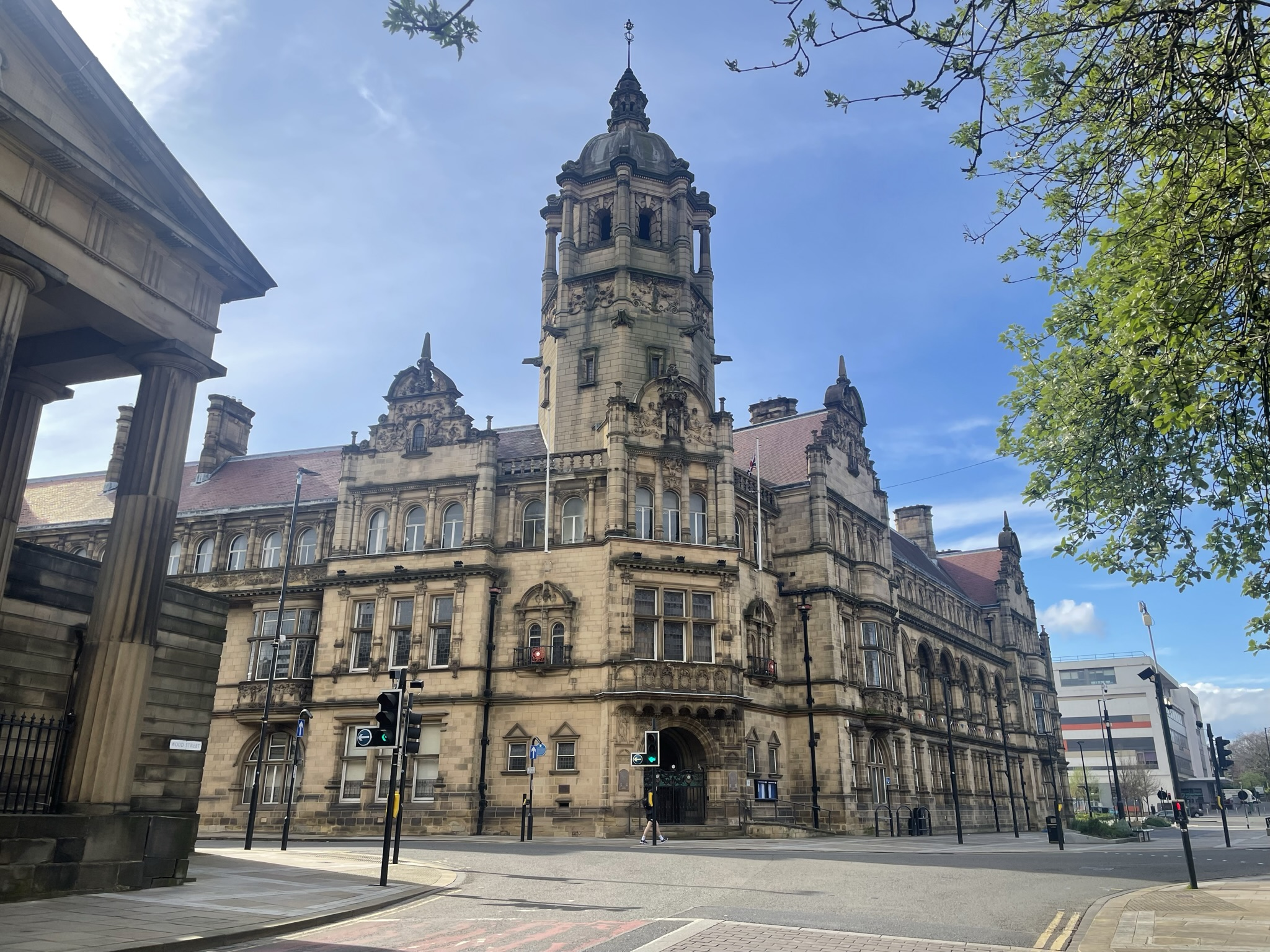
- County Hall, Wakefield

West Riding County Council (WRCC) was the county council of the administrative county of the West Riding of Yorkshire from 1 April 1889 to 31 March 1974. The council met at County Hall in Wakefield.

The county council had jurisdiction over the administrative county of the West Riding and therefore did not include county boroughs which were independent of the county council but associated with the county for other purposes. At the time of its formation in 1889 there were six county boroughs; Bradford, Halifax, Huddersfield, Leeds, Sheffield and York. The administrative county was reduced when the county boroughs of Rotherham (1902), Barnsley (1913), Dewsbury (1913), Wakefield (1915) and Doncaster (1927) were formed.

== Responsibilities and service provision ==
The County Council was responsible for the provision of services that included; health services (mothers & infants, children and school health services), welfare services for the young, elderly and infirm, the provision of ambulance services, primary and secondary education, library services, the police and fire services, highways and bridges, weights & measures and planning. To support these activities the Council administered specialist services that included finance, the County Architects Department and the Registration of Births, Deaths and Marriages.

Although not an elected politician, Sir Alec Clegg exerted substantial influence as Chief Education Officer from 1945 to 1974, directing innovative reforms in schooling and teacher training that defined much of the council's legacy in public administration.

== Political control ==
The county council consisted of elected councillors and co-opted county aldermen. The entire body of county councillors was elected every three years. Aldermen were additional members, there being a ratio of one alderman to three councillors. Aldermen had a six-year term of office, and one half of their number were elected by the councillors immediately after the triennial elections. This was the same in all county councils at this time, as defined by the Local Government Act 1888.

From the establishment of the county council in 1889 onwards the Liberal party won overall control of the council at successive county council elections, dominating the council from 1889 to 1914. Liberal domination of the council however was peppered with several years of no overall control; in 1903 and after 1912. At no point did the Liberals lose their administrative control of the council, and in the years it lacked an overall majority it relied on support from Independent and Liberal Unionist councilors.

Election	Party in control	Council Type
1889	Liberal	County Council
1892	Liberal	County Council
1895	Liberal	County Council
1898	Liberal	County Council
1901	Liberal	County Council
1904	Liberal	County Council
1907	Liberal	County Council
1910	Liberal	County Council
1913	No overall control	County Council
1919		County Council
1922		County Council
1925		County Council
1928		County Council
1931	Socialist	County Council
1934		County Council
1937		County Council
1946	Labour	County Council
1949	No overall control	County Council
1952	Labour	County Council
1955	No overall control	County Council
1958		County Council
1961		County Council
1964		County Council
1967		County Council
1970		County Council

=== Chairmen ===
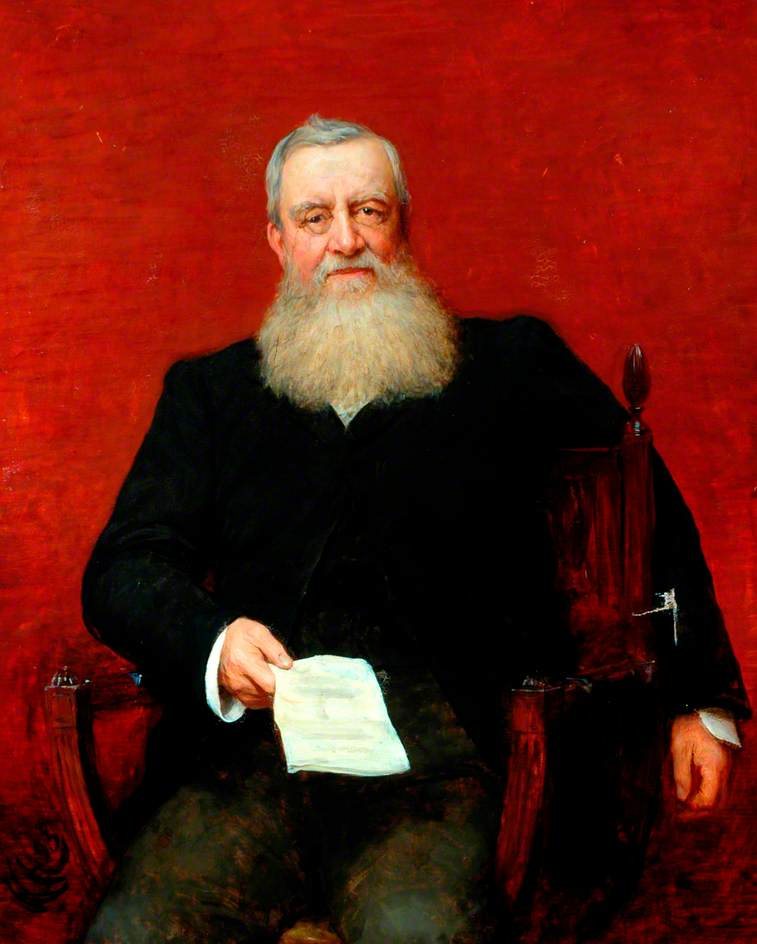
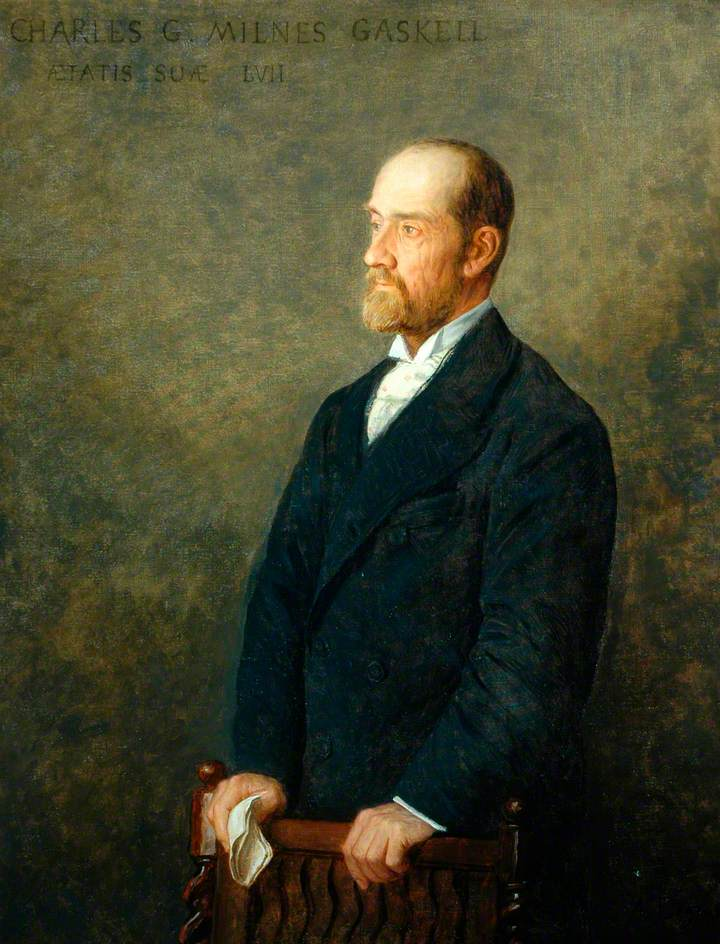
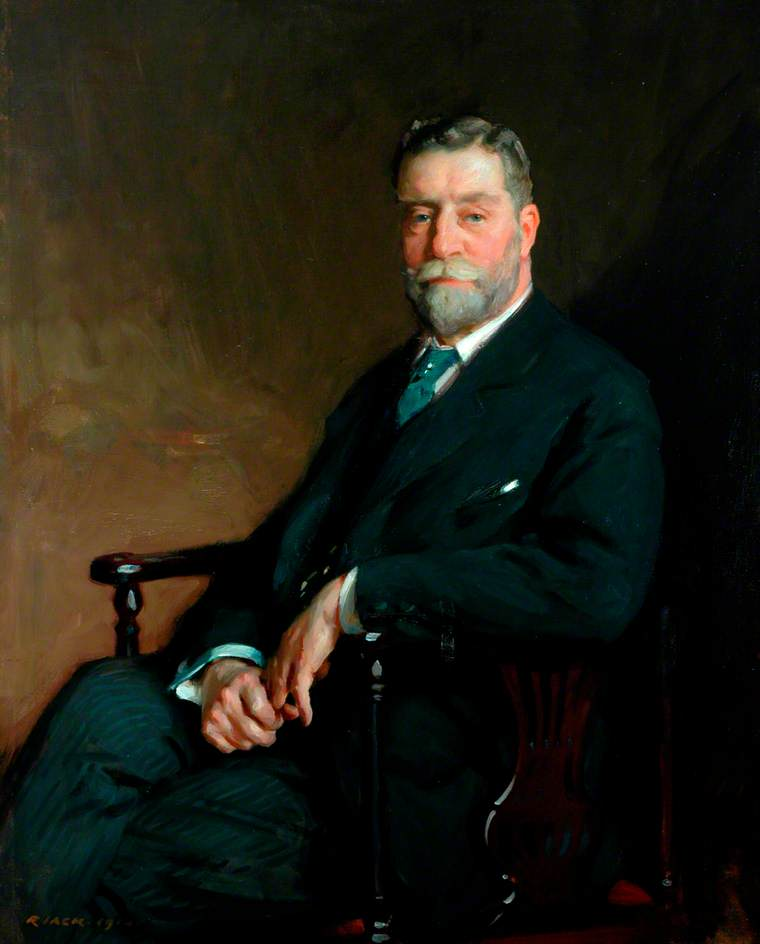
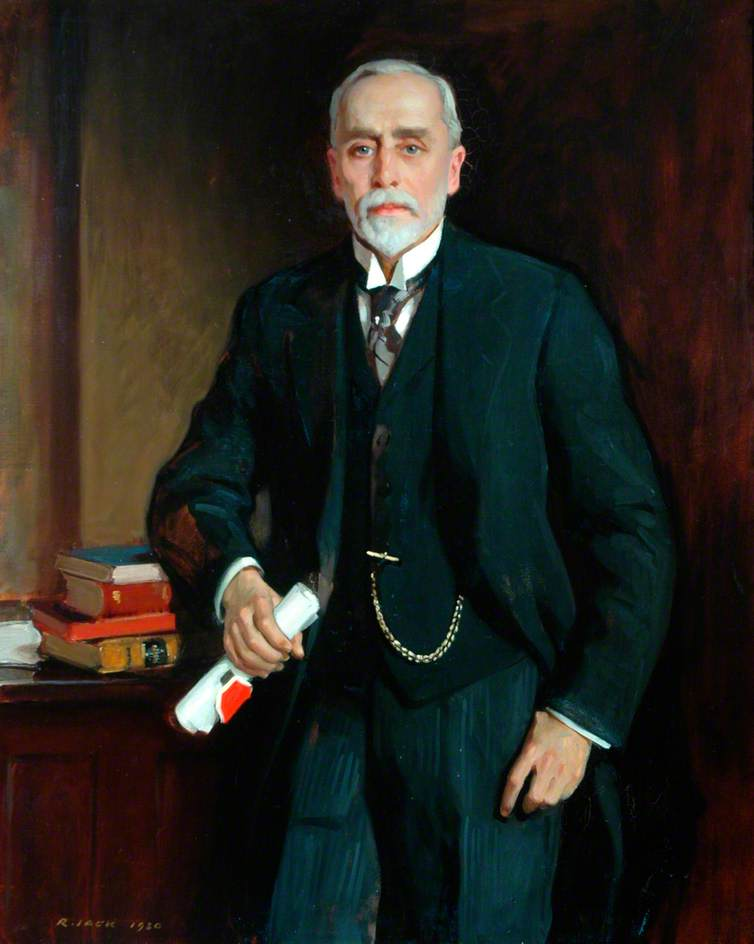
Portraits of the first four chairmen. Clockwise from top left: Ripon, Gaskell, Hinchcliffe, Horsfall.

The Chairman was the formal head of the council, though significant power was exercised through committees. The Chairman was elected annually by the council from the members or aldermen and presided over meetings. Portraits of many chairmen are held at County Hall, Wakefield.

Chairman	From	To
Marquess of Ripon	1889	1893
Charles Milnes Gaskell	1893	1910
John C Horsfall	1910	1916
James Hinchcliffe	1916	1933
G Bernard Lomas-Walker	1933	1937
William Cartwright	1937	1946
Thomas Tomlinson	1946	1949
J H Armistead	1949	1952
Thomas Tomlinson	1952	1955
Joseph Hudson	1955	1958
Walter Hyman	1958	1964
Jessie Smith	1964	1967
Joseph Hudson	1967	1970
Thomas Harold Ives	1970	1974
