= 1955 West Riding County Council election =

1955 UK local government election

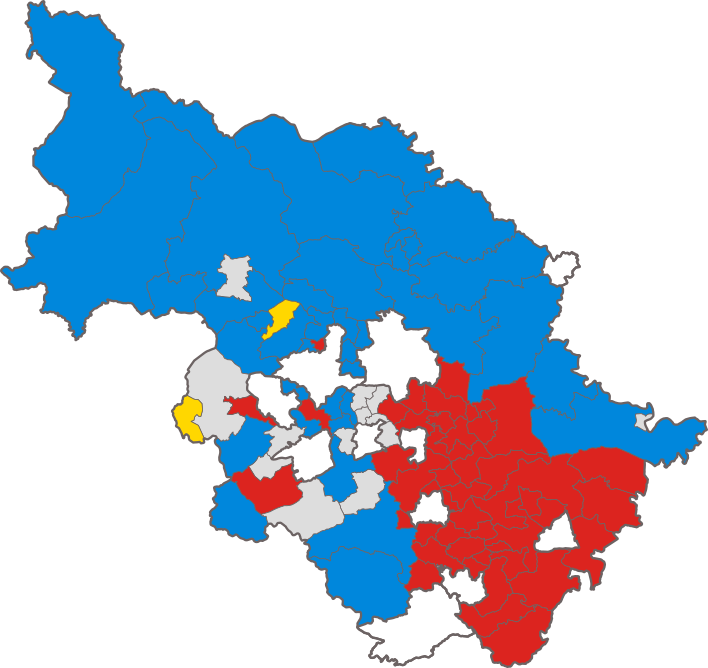
Map of the results of the election in each division.

The 1955 West Riding County Council election was held on Saturday, 2 April 1955. The election took place in the administrative county of the West Riding of Yorkshire, which excluded the county boroughs of Barnsley, Bradford, Dewsbury, Doncaster, Halifax, Huddersfield, Leeds, Rotherham, Sheffield, Wakefield and York. The whole council of ninety-six members was up for election, with each county electoral division returning one councillor.

After the election the composition of the council was;

- Labour Party: 44
- Conservative Party: 37
- Independents: 13
- Liberal Party: 2

== Results by division ==
The winning candidates in each division are shown in the table below.

Division	Party	Councillor	Majority
Adwick-le-Street	Labour	T. Baynham	Unopposed
Aireborough	Conservative	W. Hudson	643
Askern	Labour	M. Thompson	Unopposed
Aston	Labour	C. T. Broughton	Unopposed
Baildon	Conservative	P. Oates	2,154
Barnoldswick	Conservative	A. H. Clegg	445
Barwick	Conservative	F. G. W. Lane Fox	1,728
Batley No. 1	Independent	M. G. M. Newman	472
Batley No. 2	Independent	L. I. Fitzpatrick	Unopposed
Bentley	Labour	S. E. Keers	Unopposed
Bingley	Conservative	H. Whitehead	Unopposed
Birstall	Independent	W. A. Ogilvy	348
Brighouse North	Labour	H. Womersley	41
Brighouse South	Conservative	M. D. Middleton	556
Castleford No. 1	Labour	G. East	Unopposed
Castleford No. 2	Labour	C. Dews	Unopposed
Colne Valley No. 1	Independent	H. E. Eastwood	697
Colne Valley No. 2	Labour	R. Redfern	Unopposed
Conisbrough	Labour	J. Prendergast	Unopposed
Craven	Conservative	A. K. Fitton	Unopposed
Crofton	Labour	W. Henry	Unopposed
Cudworth	Labour	J. Berry	Unopposed
Dalton	Labour	H. Harrison	1,530
Darfield and Thurnscoe	Labour	H. Clarney	Unopposed
Darton	Labour	F. Morris	1,022
Dearne	Labour	J. F. Oldham	Unopposed
Denby Dale	Independent	R. K. Beever	330
Ecclesfield	Labour	E. Ratcliffe	514
Edlington	Labour	J. Yorke	866
Elland	Independent	H. Cockroft	Unopposed
Featherstone	Labour	E. Rowley	Unopposed
Garforth	Labour	R. B. Holt	Unopposed
Goole	Independent	E. L. England	343
Harrogate No. 1	Conservative	R. Martin	1,234
Harrogate No. 2	Conservative	J. C. Hunter	1,657
Harrogate No. 3	Conservative	J. S. Tennant	2,871
Hatfield and Stainforth	Labour	R. Kelley	Unopposed
Hebden Bridge	Independent	H. H. Sutcliffe	651
Heckmondwike	Conservative	C. Thackray	Unopposed
Hemsworth	Labour	H. Miles	Unopposed
Holmfirth	Independent	N. Denton	1,539
Horbury	Labour	H. V. Bennett	1,425
Horsforth	Conservative	H. E. Thackray	Unopposed
Hoyland	Labour	Sir Thomas Tomlinson	Unopposed
Ilkley	Conservative	N. Geldard	Unopposed
Keighley No. 1	Conservative	A. W. Tack	878
Keighley No. 2	Liberal	M. E. Rhodes	945
Keighley No. 3	Conservative	L. Hardaker	454
Kiveton Park	Labour	W. Holmes	Unopposed
Knaresborough	Conservative	A. C. Crowther	Unopposed
Knottingley	Labour	J. Blackburn	1,190
Kirkburton	Conservative	J. A. Stephens	633
Maltby and Tickhill	Labour	T. Cheetham	1,428
Mexborough	Labour	G. M. Hanson	77
Mirfield	Independent	G. M. Hanson	643
Morley No. 1	Independent	J. Rhodes	188
Morley No. 2	Labour	H. Rankin	511
Normanton	Labour	W. E. Metcalf	3,538
Ossett	Independent	H. Smith	478
Otley	Conservative	H. Guy	Unopposed
Pateley Bridge	Conservative	Sir John Barran	Unopposed
Penistone	Conservative	A. Goldthorpe	226
Pontefract	Labour	G. Wright	778
Pudsey No. 1	Conservative	J. Fuller Smith	Unopposed
Pudsey No. 2	Conservative	J. O. Cowgill	1,371
Queensbury and Shelf	Conservative	A. Craven	456
Rawmarsh	Labour	J. E. Payne	Unopposed
Ripon	Conservative	E. B. Eccles	Unopposed
Ripponden	Conservative	S. Stott	610
Rossington	Labour	W. A. Morris	Unopposed
Rothwell	Labour	T. S. Dawson	Unopposed
Saddleworth	Conservative	E. E. Smith	1,554
Sedbergh	Conservative	W. Illingworth	Unopposed
Selby	Conservative	C. E. Anson	Unopposed
Settle	Conservative	F. J. Cornthwaite	Unopposed
Shipley West	Conservative	G. Waddilove	Unopposed
Shipley East	Labour	S. Derbyshire	Unopposed
Silsden	Conservative	N. Fortune	1,099
Skipton	Independent	J. W. Atkinson	291
Snaith	Conservative	J. Martinson	548
South Elmsall	Labour	G. Guest	Unopposed
South Kirkby	Labour	H. Ebery	Unopposed
Sowerby Bridge	Labour	F. Barker	538
Spenborough No. 1	Conservative	F. Morton	2,016
Spenborough No. 2	Conservative	J. Smith	1,212
Stanley	Labour	J. E. Howe	Unopposed
Stocksbridge	Conservative	H. E. Green	483
Swinton	Labour	A. Newsam	Unopposed
Tadcaster	Conservative	D. W. Atkinson	1,345
Thorne	Labour	G. H. Nicholson	Unopposed
Todmorden	Liberal	J. de Ville Mather	Unopposed
Wath on Dearne	Labour	W. Cutts	Unopposed
Wetherby	Conservative	D. A. Crockatt	Unopposed
Whitwood	Labour	A. Pickersgill	Unopposed
Wombwell	Labour	J. W. Mellor	Unopposed
Worsborough	Labour	C. W. Boland	1,741
