= List of presidents of the United States by military service =

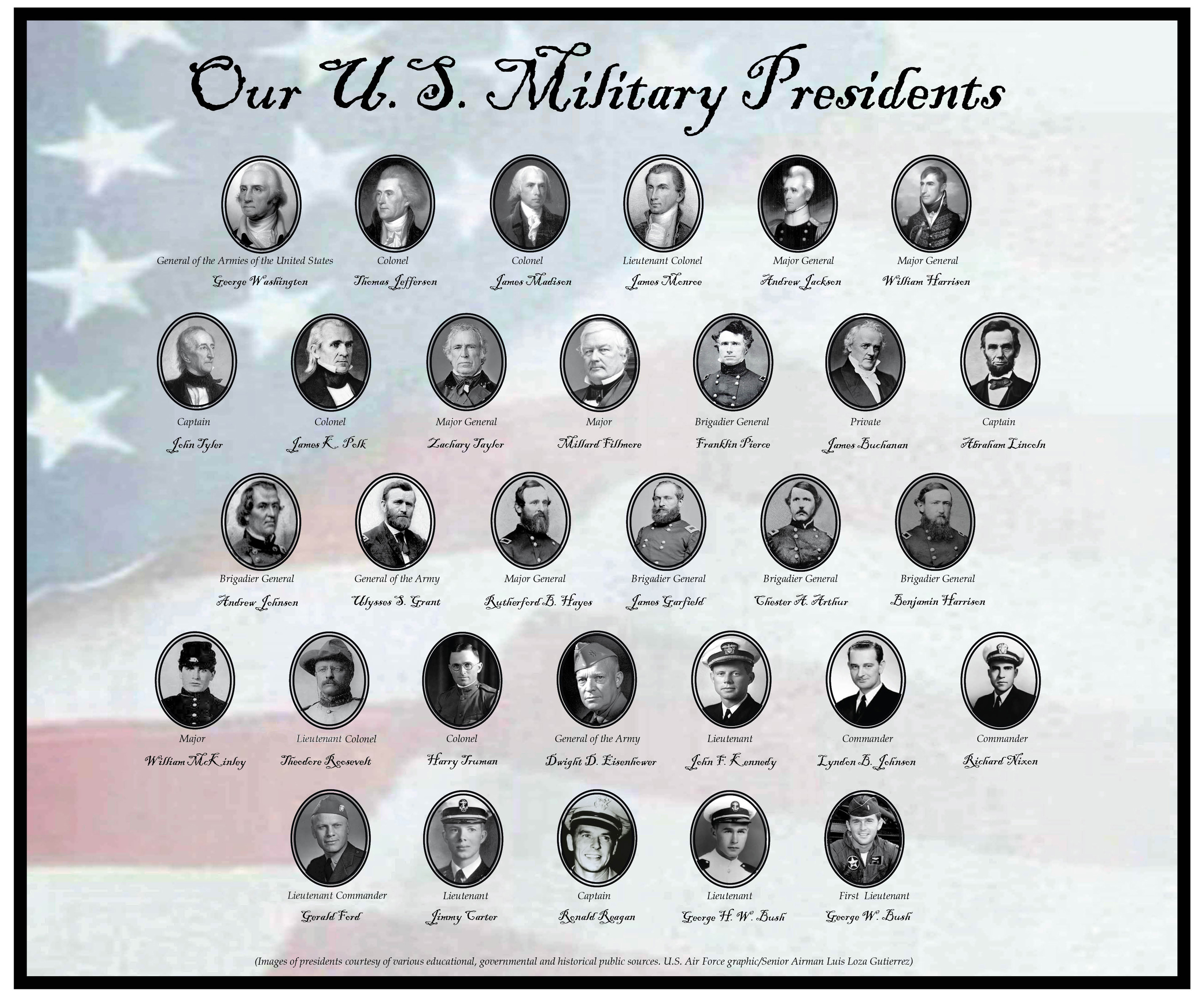
2012 US Air Force graphic depicting military-veteran presidents

Of the 45 men who have served as president of the United States, 30 had prior military service, and 16 had none. Their ranks range from private in a state militia to general of the army. Many presidents gained prominence through service in major conflicts such as the American Revolutionary War, the American Civil War, and World War II. In contrast, several later wars, including the Vietnam War and the Global War on Terror, produced few presidents with direct combat experience, reflecting broader changes in military structure, conscription, and civil–military relations.

== History ==
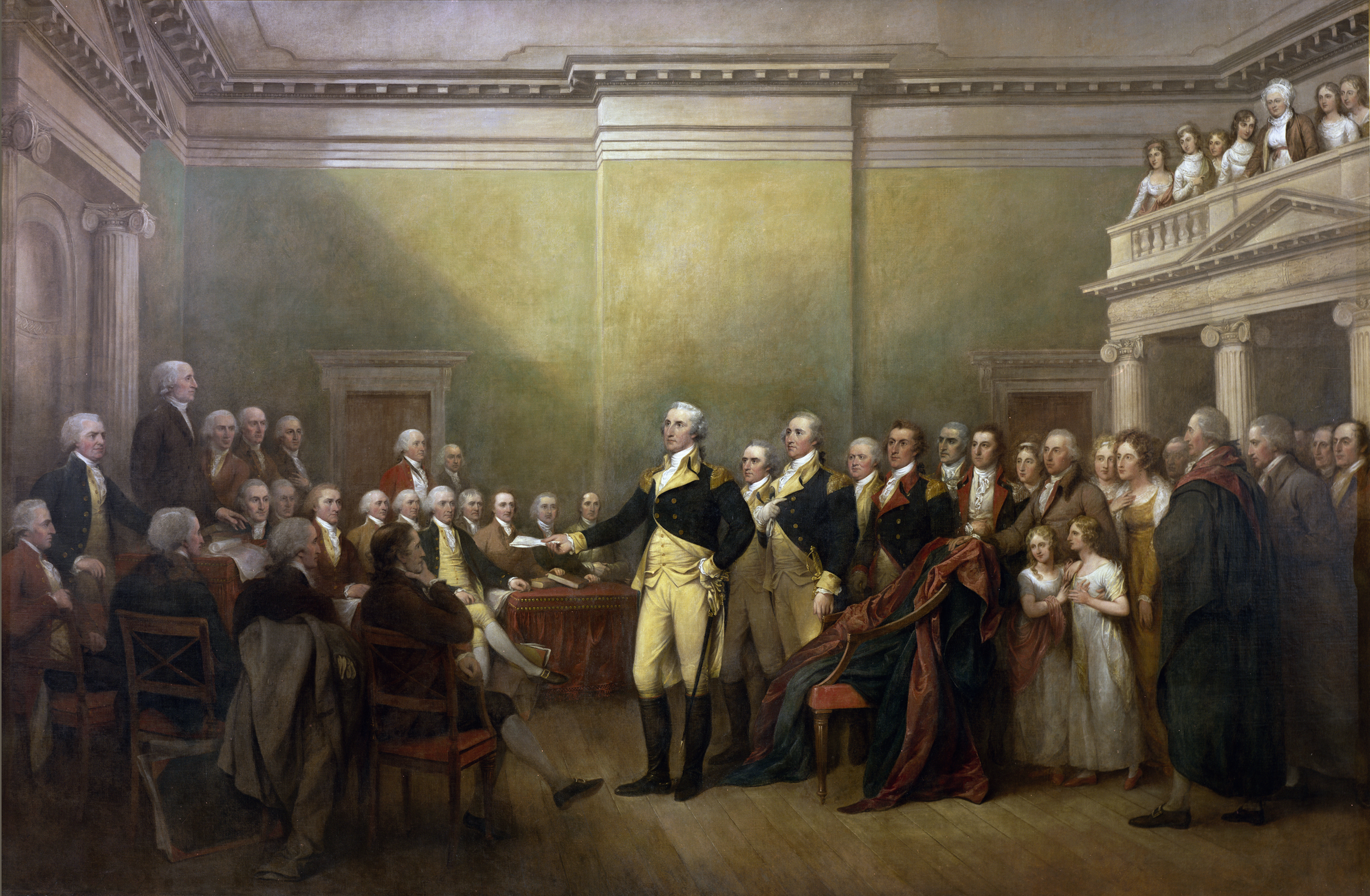
General George Washington Resigning His Commission (1824) by John Trumbull

Though the president of the United States is commander-in-chief of the United States Armed Forces, prior military service is not a prerequisite for holding the office.

=== Civil War-veteran presidents ===
After the American Civil War, public perception of an individual's appropriateness for the presidency was influenced by their combat history. After a spate of such veteran-presidents, that influence diminished before disappearing entirely.

=== World War II-veteran presidents ===
So great was the influence of World War II on US politics, Dwight D. Eisenhower won the 1952 presidential election without any political experience. This halo effect of the war benefited the successful political campaigns of John F. Kennedy, Richard Nixon, Lyndon B. Johnson, Ronald Reagan, and Jimmy Carter. However, after the 1988 presidential election, the shine had dulled on military-veteran politicians, and through 2012, "the candidate with the better military record lost." As of December 2018, George H. W. Bush was the most recent president to have served in combat (as an aircraft carrier-based bomber pilot in World War II).

=== Wars without presidents ===
==== Vietnam War ====
The 48-year tenure of veteran presidents after World War II was a result of that conflict's "pervasive effect […] on American society." In the late 1970s and 1980s, almost 60 percent of the United States Congress had served in World War II or the Korean War, and it was expected that a Vietnam veteran would eventually accede to the presidency. Yet, in the chronology of "major conflicts" involving the United States, the Vietnam War is the first to not produce a veteran president, an event that veteran and author Matt Gallagher called "no small feat for a country spawned in armed revolution." By 2017, a "bamboo ceiling" was described as holding down and preventing those who served in Vietnam from becoming president.

Barack Obama's 2006 book The Audacity of Hope argues that baby boomers never left behind the anti-military psychodrama of the 1960s, and that played out in national politics. During Bill Clinton's 1992 presidential campaign, James Carville succeeded in releasing Clinton's 1969 letter that "outlined his opposition to the [Vietnam] war and his decision to try his chances with the draft." The positive effects of this release proved the diminished cachet of military service in presidential politics. Donald Trump's 2016 campaign further cemented this; Trump was elected that November despite bragging about evading the draft, slandering Senator John McCain and other prisoners of war, and publicly feuding with Gold Star parents Khizr and Ghazala Khan. Of this, Gallagher said, "What'd once been sacred territory in American politics is now anything but."

In 2015, journalist James Fallows described the contemporary American's attitude toward their military as "we love the troops, but we'd rather not think about them". That same year, Ken Harbaugh (veteran and chief operating officer of Team Rubicon) claimed to speak on behalf of veterans when expressing his dismay, and argued that all voters should be concerned, that the 2016 United States presidential election had no likely candidates with military experience. In 2018, Gallagher noted that when given the opportunity to elect Vietnam veterans (Al Gore, McCain, and John Kerry), the US electorate did not do so. He called this emblematic of the public's "vague sense of gratitude for service members" that eschews interest or understanding: "'Thank you for your service,' but spare the details, please."

==== Global War on Terror ====
With the all-volunteer United States Armed Forces of 2018 comprising 0.5 percent of the US populace, and "the inherent politicization of the wars [current and future politicians] fought in", Gallagher doubted the viability of future veteran-presidents; "If a Global War on Terror veteran does someday lead the White House, it’ll be in spite of their time in uniform, not assisted by it."

== Politics ==
=== Asset ===
George Washington, William Henry Harrison, and Ulysses S. Grant were all career soldiers whose presidential aspirations benefited from their popularity as successful wartime general officers. Áine Cain of Military.com called veteran presidents "fitting", given their responsibility at the head of the military's command hierarchy.

=== Detriment ===
Military service has also been a political millstone for individuals seeking the presidency.

George W. Bush's service with the Air National Guard was a point of political contention in his 2000 and 2004 campaigns. Kerry's tours in Vietnam were similarly questioned. McCain's 2000 and 2008 presidential campaigns saw the retired captain's service used against him. Donald Trump's five deferments from conscription during the Vietnam War dogged his first presidential campaign. Joe Biden received criticism during his 2020 presidential campaign for his five student draft deferments.

Presidents Bill Clinton, George W. Bush, and Donald Trump all received criticism for deploying the armed forces in combat while having not served in that capacity themselves.

== Policy ==
As noted in The Atlantic, presidents' military histories influence their policy-making in office.

== List of presidents ==
| No. (term) | President | Highest rank | Last service | Ref. |
|---|---|---|---|---|
| 1 (1789–1797) | George Washington | General of the Armies | United States Army | |
| 2 (1797–1801) | John Adams | —N/a | | |
| 3 (1801–1809) | Thomas Jefferson | Colonel | Virginian militia | |
| 4 (1809–1817) | James Madison | Colonel | Virginian militia | |
| 5 (1817–1825) | James Monroe | Colonel | Virginian militia | |
| 6 (1825–1829) | John Quincy Adams | —N/a | | |
| 7 (1829–1837) | Andrew Jackson | Major general | United States Army | |
| 8 (1837–1841) | Martin Van Buren | —N/a | | |
| 9 (1841) | William Henry Harrison | Major general | United States Army | |
| 10 (1841–1845) | John Tyler | Captain | Virginian militia | |
| 11 (1845–1849) | James K. Polk | Colonel | Tennessee Militia | |
| 12 (1849–1850) | Zachary Taylor | Major general | United States Army | |
| 13 (1850–1853) | Millard Fillmore | Major | New York Militia | |
| 14 (1853–1857) | Franklin Pierce | Brigadier general | United States Army | |
| 15 (1857–1861) | James Buchanan | Private | Pennsylvania militia | |
| 16 (1861–1865) | Abraham Lincoln | Captain | Illinois State Militia | |
| 17 (1865–1869) | Andrew Johnson | Brigadier general | Union army (Volunteers) | |
| 18 (1869–1877) | Ulysses S. Grant | General of the Armies | Union army | |
| 19 (1877–1881) | Rutherford B. Hayes | Major general | Union army (Volunteers) | |
| 20 (1881) | James A. Garfield | Major general | Union army | |
| 21 (1881–1885) | Chester A. Arthur | Brigadier general | New York Militia | |
| 22 (1885–1889) | Grover Cleveland | —N/a | | |
| 23 (1889–1893) | Benjamin Harrison | Brigadier general | Union army | |
| 24 (1893–1897) | Grover Cleveland | —N/a | | |
| 25 (1897–1901) | William McKinley | Captain | Union army (Volunteers) | |
| 26 (1901–1909) | Theodore Roosevelt | Colonel | United States Army (Volunteers) | |
| 27 (1909–1913) | William Howard Taft | —N/a | | |
| 28 (1913–1921) | Woodrow Wilson | —N/a | | |
| 29 (1921–1923) | Warren G. Harding | —N/a | | |
| 30 (1923–1929) | Calvin Coolidge | —N/a | | |
| 31 (1929–1933) | Herbert Hoover | —N/a | | |
| 32 (1933–1945) | Franklin D. Roosevelt | —N/a | | |
| 33 (1945–1953) | Harry S. Truman | Colonel | United States Army Reserve | |
| 34 (1953–1961) | Dwight D. Eisenhower | General of the Army | United States Army | |
| 35 (1961–1963) | John F. Kennedy | Lieutenant | United States Naval Reserve | |
| 36 (1963–1969) | Lyndon B. Johnson | Commander | United States Naval Reserve | |
| 37 (1969–1974) | Richard Nixon | Commander | United States Naval Reserve | |
| 38 (1974–1977) | Gerald Ford | Lieutenant commander | United States Naval Reserve | |
| 39 (1977–1981) | Jimmy Carter | Lieutenant | United States Navy | |
| 40 (1981–1989) | Ronald Reagan | Captain | United States Army Reserve | |
| 41 (1989–1993) | George H. W. Bush | Lieutenant | United States Naval Reserve | |
| 42 (1993–2001) | Bill Clinton | —N/a | | |
| 43 (2001–2009) | George W. Bush | First lieutenant | Texas Air National Guard | |
| 44 (2009–2017) | Barack Obama | —N/a | | |
| 45 (2017–2021) | Donald Trump | —N/a | | |
| 46 (2021–2025) | Joe Biden | —N/a | | |
| 47 (2025–present) | Donald Trump | —N/a | | |

== See also ==
- List of presidents of the United States by military rank
