= Kaboom (book) =

Military blog

- Official cover
- Author: Matt Gallagher
- Cover artist: Alex Camlin
- Language: English
- Series: Iraq War
- Subject: Military
- Genre: Non-fiction
- Publisher: Da Capo Press
- Publication date: March 23, 2010
- Publication place: United States
- Pages: 310
- ISBN: 978-0-306-81967-4
- OCLC: 706029541
- Dewey Decimal: 956.704434092
- LC Class: DS79.76 .G343 2010

Kaboom: A Soldier's War Journal was a popular military blog from November 2007 to June 2008, before it was shut down by the writer's military chain of command. The author of the online journal, who went by the pseudonym of LT G, wrote about the front-line experiences in the Iraq War as a United States Army soldier. A scout platoon leader, LT G often incorporated the trials and tribulations of his platoon in his writings, offering a brash and brutally honest perspective of modern warfare. Kaboom was shut down, and subsequently deleted, after LT G made a post detailing his turning down of a promotion in an effort to stay with his soldiers.

Before Kaboom was shut down, it was one of the few military blogs to garner attention and press coverage from the print media. This can be attributed to LT G's literary writing style. In a nationally published story chronicling the rise and fall of Kaboom, LT G was revealed to be Matt Gallagher, a young Army officer who had been promoted to captain soon after his blog was shut down.

== Kaboom: Embracing the Suck in a Savage Little War ==
In May 2009, Da Capo Press announced they had signed Gallagher to a book deal. The book, entitled Kaboom: Embracing the Suck in a Savage Little War, was published on April 1, 2010. A war memoir that blends traditional memoir and creative nonfiction techniques, Kaboom chronicles Gallagher's fifteen-month deployment with 2-14 Cavalry and 1-27 Infantry during the Surge.

It received widespread critical acclaim. Michiko Kakutani in The New York Times praised Gallagher for "his love of language, acquired as an avid reader, and his elastic voice as a writer - his ability to move effortlessly between the earnest and the irreverent, the thoughtful and the comic."

In The Wall Street Journal, Bing West wrote that "Understanding that comedy best captures the irony of the human condition, Mr. Gallagher pokes fun at himself, his soldiers and those above him ... Without a trace of sentimentality, Mr. Gallagher draws the reader into the everyday complexities of leading soldiers from every strata of American society ... Mr. Gallagher is too modest, and too ironic, to tout his own accomplishments, so I'll do it for him: He is a classic representative of the U.S. military, a force that imposed its will, both physical and moral, to shatter al Qaeda."

Noted Middle Eastern scholar and author Andrew Exum wrote that Kaboom "may well be the best memoir to have been written about the wars in Iraq and Afghanistan ... Kaboom is laugh-out loud funny. And brutal." Patrick Hennessey, author of The Junior Officers' Reading Club, wrote in The Financial Times that Kaboom is "Surely the Jarhead of the second Gulf war."
