= List of presidents of the United States by military rank =

The United States Constitution names the president of the United States the commander-in-chief of the United States Armed Forces. Many presidents, however, also served in the military before taking office. All but 13 of the 45 (Note: As of 2025, there have been 45 presidents and 47 presidencies, owing to the nonconsecutive terms of Grover Cleveland and Donald Trump.) persons to become president have served.

Of the 32 presidents with military service, 31 have been commissioned officers, of whom five began their careers as regular officers (Jimmy Carter transferred to the Navy Reserve after five years in the Navy). There have been 13 presidents who held general officer rank (four regular officers, six militia officers, three volunteers).

== Table of United States presidents by military rank ==
=== General of the Armies ===
| Rank order | Highest rank | Branch | President | Service experience | Service notes |
|---|---|---|---|---|---|
| 1 | No official insignia (Note: John J. Pershing, the only person to receive the rank while still on active service, only ever wore four silver stars like other 4-star generals.) General of the Armies of the United States | (Kingdom of Great Britain); Virginian militia (1752–1758) Continental Army (1775–1783); United States Army (1798–1799) | George Washington (Note: See Military career of George Washington for additional information.) | French and Indian War (1754–1758) (Note: Washington attained the rank of colonel in the French and Indian War; see George Washington in the French and Indian War for additional information.); Revolutionary War (1775–1783) (Note: For additional information, see George Washington in the American Revolution.); Whiskey Rebellion (1791–1794) – Thanks of Congress | Served in the Virginian militia (1752–1758) during the French and Indian War; Served as commander in chief of the Continental Army (1775–1783) during the Revolutionary War, with the rank of "General and Commander in Chief." Washington was a lieutenant general in the United States Army at his death.; In 1976, as part of the Bicentennial, then-president Gerald Ford posthumously appointed Washington as General of the Armies, a rank that ensured he would forever rank above all other officers. |
| 1 | No official insignia General of the Armies of the United States | United States Army (Regular Army) | Ulysses S. Grant | Mexican–American War; Civil War – Thanks of Congress | Graduated West Point; first lieutenant general since Washington, appointed as four-star General of the Army in 1866. In 2022 Grant was promoted by the United States Congress to General of the Armies to celebrate the 200th anniversary of his birth. The rank of General of the Armies is considered senior to General of the Army. Grant became the third person to become General of the Armies after John J. Pershing and George Washington. Grant and Pershing are outranked by only Washington. |

=== General of the Army (Special grade; OF-10) ===
| Rank order | Highest rank | Branch | President | Combat experience | Service notes |
|---|---|---|---|---|---|
| 2 | General of the Army | United States Army (Regular Army) | Dwight D. Eisenhower | Supreme Commander of the Allied Invasion of Europe, primarily the Battles for Normandy, France and Germany World War II – Army Distinguished Service Medal (5) Navy Distinguished Service Medal | Graduated West Point; served 1915–1952, resigned to run for president. Commission and rank restored by Congress in 1961. Commissioned but inactive until death. Served stateside during World War I and as Supreme Allied Commander during World War II |

=== Major General (O-8; OF-7) ===
| Rank order | Highest rank | Branch | President | Combat experience | Service notes |
|---|---|---|---|---|---|
| 3 | Major General | United States Army; North Carolina Militia; Tennessee Militia | Andrew Jackson | Revolutionary War; Creek War; War of 1812; First Seminole War – Thanks of Congress | Served at age 13 as a militia messenger during the Revolutionary War; was captured, becoming the only president to have been held as a prisoner of war (Washington had surrendered in the French and Indian War but was immediately paroled); served in the War of 1812, attaining the rank of major general and became a national hero after his success at the Battle of New Orleans. |
| 3 | Major General | United States Army | William H. Harrison | Northwest Indian War; War of 1812 – Thanks of Congress | Dates of service: 1791–1798, 1812–1814. Became a national hero after success at the Battle of the Thames |
| 3 | Major General | United States Army | Zachary Taylor | War of 1812; Black Hawk War; Second Seminole War; Mexican–American War – Thanks of Congress | Became a national hero because of his achievements in the Mexican–American War |
| 3 | Major General of Volunteers | United States Army (volunteers) | James A. Garfield | Civil War | His heroic ride at the Battle of Chickamauga later helped him to be elected president. |
| 3 | Major General | American Red Cross (Under jurisdiction of the U.S. War Department) | William Howard Taft | None | He was Secretary of War under President Theodore Roosevelt from 1904 to 1908. Taft also joined a Connecticut Home Guard unit during World War I. He was commissioned with a military rank in the American Red Cross by President Wilson August 1917. |

=== Brigadier General (O-7; OF-6) ===
| Rank order | Highest rank | Branch | President | Combat experience | Service notes |
|---|---|---|---|---|---|
| 4 | Brigadier General | United States Army; New Hampshire Militia | Franklin Pierce | Mexican–American War | Served in the New Hampshire Militia from 1831 to 1847 and attained the rank of colonel. Appointed to command the 9th Infantry Regiment during army expansion for the Mexican–American War. Subsequently promoted to brigadier general and command of a brigade |
| 4 | Brigadier General | New York State Militia | Chester A. Arthur | Inspector general of the New York Militia – Civil War | Joined militia as judge advocate of 2nd Brigade. Appointed quartermaster general on governor's staff, and later appointed inspector general. Offered command of brigade raised in New York City, but governor declined to allow him to leave state service. Left service in 1863 after the new governor appointed a successor |
| 4 | Brigadier General | United States Army | Andrew Johnson | Military Governor of Tennessee – Civil War | Served in the 90th Regiment of Tennessee Militia in 1830s. Later appointed colonel |
| 4 | Brigadier General | United States Army (volunteers) | Rutherford B. Hayes | Civil War | Successful leadership in Virginia/West Virginia region; wounded at the Battle of South Mountain. Later appointed brevet major general |
| 4 | Brigadier General | United States Army; Indiana State Militia | Benjamin Harrison | Civil War | Battle of Perryville; Atlanta campaign Battle of Nashville |

=== Colonel (O-6; OF-5) ===
| Rank order | Highest rank | Branch | President | Combat experience | Service notes |
|---|---|---|---|---|---|
| 5 | Colonel | Virginia State Militia; Albemarle County | Thomas Jefferson | None | Like other Virginia gentlemen, he had militia duties, and did administrative work. |
| 5 | Colonel | Virginia Colonial Militia; Orange County | James Madison | None | Left the militia to enter the Virginia legislature (Some sources claim Madison briefly assumed command of an artillery battery during the British assault on Washington during the War of 1812. If true, he would join Washington as having seen military service as commander-in-chief.) |
| 5 | Colonel | Continental Army; Virginia State Militia | James Monroe | Revolutionary War | Dates of service: 1776–1779. Wounded and nearly died in the Battle of Trenton. Returned to Virginia to recruit and lead a regiment as a militia lieutenant colonel, but the regiment was never raised. Commissioned as a colonel during the British invasion of Virginia in 1780 to command the militia raised in response and act as liaison to the Continental Army in North Carolina. Appointed As Secretary of State during the War of 1812, scouted and deployed troops during the British invasion of Washington |
| 5 | Colonel | Tennessee Militia | border[ James K. Polk | None | Captain in a cavalry unit beginning in 1821. Subsequently appointed colonel on staff of Governor William Carroll |
| 5 | Colonel | United States Army | Theodore Roosevelt | Spanish–American War – Medal of Honor (posthumously; 2001) | Commissioned as a second lieutenant in the New York National Guard's 8th Regiment in 1882. Company commander with rank of captain when he resigned in 1886. Battlefield promotion to colonel the day before leading his Famous charge up San Juan Hill. Posthumously awarded the Medal of Honor. As ex-president, volunteered for service in World War I, but President Wilson declined. |
| 5 | Colonel | United States Army | Harry S. Truman | World War I – Armed Forces Reserve Medal (2) | Served 1905–1911, then in World War I, 129th Field Artillery (1917–1919), Army Reserves (1919–1953) |

=== Commander (O-5; OF-4) ===
| Rank order | Highest rank | Branch | President | Combat experience | Service notes |
|---|---|---|---|---|---|
| 6 | Commander | United States Navy (Reserve) | Lyndon B. Johnson | World War II – Silver Star | Awarded the Silver Star by General Douglas MacArthur for his role as an observer on a Martin B-26 Marauder bomber mission. This award has been the subject of controversy. |
| 6 | Commander | United States Navy (Reserve) | Richard Nixon | World War II – Navy and Marine Corps Commendation Medal | Served 1942–1945 on various islands in the South Pacific and commanded SCAT units. United States Naval Reserve (1946–1966) |

=== Major/Lieutenant Commander (O-4; OF-3) ===
| Rank order | Highest rank | Branch | President | Combat experience | Service notes |
|---|---|---|---|---|---|
| 7 | Major | New York State Militia | Millard Fillmore | None | Years of service: 1820s–1830s, 1860s–1870s |
| 7 | Brevet major | United States Army (volunteers) | William McKinley | Civil War | Served in the Army of the Potomac, originally with the 23rd Ohio Infantry, the same unit as President Rutherford B. Hayes. First major engagement in West Virginia in 1861 and was present at the surrender of the Army of Northern Virginia |
| 7 | Lieutenant Commander | United States Navy (Reserve) | Gerald Ford | World War II – American Campaign Medal Asiatic–Pacific Campaign Medal | Years of service: 1942–1946. Served on USS Monterey. Earned 10 battle stars |

=== Captain / Lieutenant (naval) (O-3; OF-2) ===
| Rank order | Highest rank | Branch | President | Combat experience | Service notes |
|---|---|---|---|---|---|
| 8 | Captain | Virginia State Militia | John Tyler | War of 1812 | Raised a company for the defense of Richmond in 1813 |
| 8 | Captain | Illinois State Militia | Abraham Lincoln | Black Hawk War | Initially elected to command a company as a captain. Was mustered in and out of service during the Black Hawk War, going from Captain to Private and finishing his service in an independent spy company commanded by Captain Jacob Early. Honorably discharged without seeing combat. Also served in Stillman's Run and the Battle of Kellogg's Grove |
| 8 | Captain | United States Army Air Forces (Reserve) | Ronald Reagan | None | Served as a second lieutenant in the U.S. Army Reserve; served in the United States Army Air Forces during World War II, attaining the rank of captain. Was barred from combat because of poor eyesight. Narrated pre-flight training films under the Army Air Forces Motion Picture Unit |
| 8 | Lieutenant | United States Navy (Reserve) | John F. Kennedy | World War II – Navy and Marine Corps Medal | Commanded a PT boat. Earned the Navy and Marine Corps Medal for heroism in the PT-109 Incident |
| 8 | Lieutenant | United States Navy (Reserve) | George H. W. Bush | World War II –Distinguished Flying Cross | Years of service: 1942–1955 (on active service 1942–1945). Second youngest pilot in the United States Navy during World War II (Three days before turning 19). Earned the Distinguished Flying Cross |
| 8 | Lieutenant | United States Navy (Reserve) | Jimmy Carter | World War II – China Service Medal | Years of service: 1946–1961 (on active service 1946–1953). Graduated 59th in class of 1946 out of 820, United States Naval Academy at Annapolis, Submarine service (Nuclear Specialist). Midshipman during World War II, served during the Korean War, but never sent to Korea |

=== First lieutenant (O-2; OF-1) ===
| Rank order | Highest rank | Branch | President | Combat experience | Service notes |
9
| 9 | First lieutenant | United States; Air Force (Air National Guard) | George W. Bush | None – Air and Space Outstanding Unit Award | Performed Air National Guard duty as an F-102 pilot through April 1972, logging 336 hours, when he lost his authorization to be a pilot for failing to meet attendance and physical examination requirements He was later discharged eight months short of his six-year service requirement. |

=== Private (E-1; OR-1) ===
| Rank order | Highest rank | Branch | President | Combat experience | Service notes |
|---|---|---|---|---|---|
| 10 | Private | Pennsylvania Militia | James Buchanan | War of 1812 | Joined a volunteer light dragoon unit and served in the defense of Baltimore. Only future president with military service who did not serve as an officer |

=== Did not serve ===
| President | Service notes |
|---|---|
| John Adams | Adams was 41 years old when the Revolutionary War broke out and did not serve in the field. In addition to his diplomatic duties during the war, he served an executive role in managing the distribution of ammunition and other supplies for the Continental Army and coordinating strategic communication among the generals of the various theaters. He is sometimes called the "de facto Secretary of War" during this time. |
| John Quincy Adams | The U.S. did not fight any major wars during the time when Adams was of the usual age for military service (18 to 34) and the peacetime armed forces were very small during this time. It would not have been expected for a member of a prominent, wealthy family to serve unless a war broke out. |
| Martin Van Buren | Van Buren was a member of the New York state senate when the War of 1812 began and was involved in the military justice system and on issues of military administration during the war. |
| Grover Cleveland | Drafted during the Civil War, but paid $150 for a substitute (a legal option under the terms of the Enrollment Act of 1863, and his substitute survived the war) |
| Woodrow Wilson | The U.S. did not fight any major wars during the time when Wilson was of the usual age for military service (18 to 34) and the peacetime armed forces were very small during this time. Wilson was in his mid-40s and working as a professor at Princeton during the Spanish-American War. Moreover, his poor health (he had experienced a minor stroke in 1896), would have disqualified him from any active service. |
| Warren G. Harding | Harding was a 33-year-old member of the Ohio state senate when the Spanish-American War broke out. |
| Calvin Coolidge | Coolidge was 26 years old, practicing as an attorney, and serving as a city council member when the Spanish-American War broke out. |
| Herbert Hoover | Served in a private humanitarian capacity as a civilian in Europe during World War I. He was also involved in the Siege of Tientsin during the Boxer Rebellion as a guide for U.S. Marines. |
| Franklin D. Roosevelt | Attempted to join the Navy during the Spanish–American War but was unable as he contracted measles. Served as Assistant Secretary of the Navy from 1913 and through World War I; when the U.S. entered the war in 1917 he offered his resignation so that he could apply for a commission in the Navy, but was refused by the president. However he did visit the Western Front in 1918. |
| Bill Clinton | Received a 2-A student draft deferment during the Vietnam War, and later registered for the draft. He received a high draft number, was not drafted, and did not serve. |
| Barack Obama | Reached the age of 18 in 1979, six years after the end of the military draft in the U.S. |
| Donald Trump | Attended New York Military Academy for secondary school, graduating in 1964. Received four draft deferments while attending college, then one for medical reasons after bone spurs on his heels were diagnosed. |
| Joe Biden | While in school, received five student draft deferments and afterward was classified as unavailable for military service owing to asthma. |

== See also ==
- List of presidents of the United States
- United States military seniority
