= United States military seniority =

United States military seniority is the method by which the United States Armed Forces determines precedence among commissioned officers. A higher-ranked officer is senior to a lower-ranked one; among officers of the same rank, seniority derives from the date when appointed to that rank. Seniority is used to determine assignments, tactical commands, promotions and general courtesy. To a lesser extent, historical seniority is used to recognize status of honor given to early United States military leaders such as inaugural holders of certain ranks or those officers who served as leaders during major wars and armed conflicts.

== Modern-day seniority ==
The modern-day seniority system of the United States commissioned officer corps operates on two different levels. For officers of different ranks, seniority is simply determined by who holds the highest rank. For instance, Army colonel is senior to captain and captain senior to lieutenant. Seniority extends across services as for instance major in the Army is senior to captain in the Air Force while commander in the United States Navy is senior to both. For officers in the same rank or paygrade, seniority is determined by the dates on which they assumed their ranks. If officers of the same grade have the same date of rank, seniority is determined by the officers' appointment to the previous rank. If all promotion dates of ranks are the same, seniority is then determined by order of: previous active duty grade relative seniority (if applicable), total active commissioned service, and finally, total federal commissioned service or date of appointment as a commissioned officer. The secretaries of each service may establish further seniority rules if necessary.

Whenever two or more officers in the same grade or rank are on duty in the same area, field command, or organization, and are all eligible to command, the president may assign command to any of them without regard to seniority.

A type of "positional seniority" exists for military officers who hold top leadership positions of the armed forces. For instance, the Chairman of the Joint Chiefs of Staff is considered the most senior officer of the entire United States military, although contemporaries of the same rank may have earlier dates of rank or longer time in service. Similarly, heads of various armed service branches are considered most senior within their service; unified commanders are also considered most senior in their respective regions, but not necessarily to each other.

The regular United States military hierarchy is as follows:

- Chairman of the Joint Chiefs of Staff
- Vice Chairman of the Joint Chiefs of Staff

When compared to each other, seniority among the service chiefs is determined by the date when the officer assumed that particular office, from the following group:

- Chief of Staff of the United States Army
- Commandant of the Marine Corps
- Chief of Naval Operations
- Chief of Staff of the United States Air Force
- Chief of Space Operations
- Chief of the National Guard Bureau

The Commandant of the Coast Guard has seniority and precedence immediately after the service chiefs.

The officers in charge of the Unified Combatant Commands are considered "operational officers" while the standard military hierarchy is administrative. For instance, the Chief of Naval Operations, who would most likely be senior to a naval admiral in command of the United States Pacific Command, would not be able to issue direct orders to said commander since operational chain of command is separate from regular administrative military hierarchy. Military seniority, within itself, would not be affected.

== Tactical and operational seniority ==
Tactical seniority, also known as "battlefield seniority", is the manner in which a senior officer in command of a given tactical situation is determined. For instance, within the United States Navy, groups of ships performing exercises together will have one ship designated as the tactical senior unit. The commander of said ship is the senior tactical officer and may in fact be junior in rank to the other officers of the tactical group. For multi-national exercises, such as the Sharem event in South Korea, ships of foreign nations are sometimes given tactical seniority and thus may issue routine movement orders to United States vessels. Actual combat would fall under the Task Force system, in which a United States admiral, with clear seniority, would take command over all vessels.

Groups of Army units, especially in active combat, may be placed under tactical command of any officer, regardless of rank seniority, for completion of a single mission. During World War II, the term "mixed unit" was commonly used to denote military formations created from several other smaller units, most often "on the spot", due to operational confusion and the need for a single battlefield commander to take authority over all units physically present. Army Air Force bomber groups operated on a similar principle, in that tactical command could pass to officers who were not necessarily the most senior present, given the specific needs of the mission or casualties during the mission itself.

Operational seniority refers to the ability to issue long range orders to U.S. forces, such as deployments, general orders, and other administrative matters. Operational seniority is never granted to non-U.S. officers and usually stems from such major offices as the Bureau of Naval Personnel or the Army Personnel Branch.

== Historical seniority ==
The only case where historical seniority has been legally established by the United States Congress are for the two "super ranks" of the armed forces of the United States, these being the ranks General of the Armies and Admiral of the Navy. By clear precedent, the holders of these two ranks (four persons in all) are senior to all other officers of the United States military, past and present. By special Congressional edict, George Washington is considered the most senior officer of all time meaning he may never be lesser in seniority to any other military officer, although Washington technically shares the same rank with John Pershing and Ulysses S. Grant.

The office of general was discontinued after the Civil War, but revived in 1919 by the title of "General of the Armies of the United States" when General John J. Pershing was appointed to that office on 3 September 1919; accepted the appointment on 8 September 1919, was retired with that rank on 13 September 1924, and held it until his death on 15 July 1948. No other officer has occupied this office on active duty. General Pershing held the grade of General of the Armies of the United States under the provisions of the Act of U.S. Congress of 3 September 1919 (Public Law 45). Washington was posthumously appointed General of the Armies of the United States under Public Law 94-479. Under s:Order 31-3, the effective promotion date was on 4 July 1976. Congress specified that no officer of the United States Army should outrank Lieutenant General George Washington on the Army list. While promoted to a lieutenant general only a year before his death, he was the most senior officer and the only lieutenant general in the army. The same is true of Ulysses S. Grant, who was the second person to permanently hold this rank. (Winfield Scott was a brevet lieutenant general for his service in the Mexican–American War.) Washington was referred to as "commander in chief" of the Continental Army, a title that since the adoption of the Constitution has been reserved for the (civilian) President.

The five star officers of World War II are technically considered the most senior officers in U.S. history (with the exception of the two "super ranks" previously mentioned), yet are often considered historically junior to the military leaders of the 19th century, especially the inaugural holders of senior military ranks. Most historical seniority lists also omit three star officers, with some rare exceptions (such as Winfield Scott), and typically avoid comparing two star ranks and below, which are permanent ranks held by hundreds of officers over the past two centuries. In these cases, standard methods of seniority are used. Since 1981, the highest rank held by any officer in the U.S. armed forces is four stars, or a pay grade of "O-10". Modern-day admirals and generals are typically not considered in lists of historical seniority, except for extreme cases such as leaders of wars or other wide scale armed conflicts.

== See also ==
- List of presidents of the United States by military rank
- List of active duty United States four-star officers
- List of United States Air Force four-star generals
- List of United States Army four-star generals
- List of United States Marine Corps four-star generals
- List of United States Navy four-star admirals
- List of United States Public Health Service Commissioned Corps four-star admirals
- List of United States Space Force four-star generals
