= Matt Gallagher (author) =

American author (born 1983)

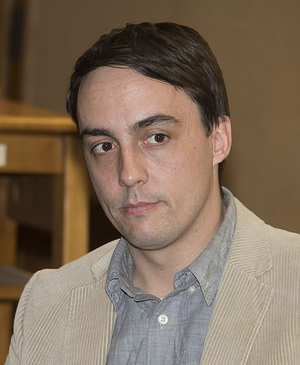
- Gallagher at West Point, February 2017
- Born: February 24, 1983 (age 43); Reno, Nevada, U.S.
- Citizenship: American
- Education: Wake Forest University (BA); Columbia University (MFA)
- Occupations: Novelist, short story writer, essayist

Matt Gallagher (born February 24, 1983) is an American author, veteran of the Iraq War and war correspondent. Gallagher has written on a variety of subjects, mainly contemporary war fiction and non-fiction. He first became known for his war memoir Kaboom (2010), which tells of his and his scout platoon's experiences during the Iraq War.

Gallagher was interviewed in September 2016 at the 92nd Street Y in Manhattan by General (Retired) David H. Petraeus. Gallagher's debut novel Youngblood was published in February 2016 by Atria Books, an imprint of Simon & Schuster. Youngblood was met with widespread critical acclaim, receiving positive reviews and features in The New York Times, The Washington Post, Esquire, The Wall Street Journal and Vogue, and others. It was selected as a finalist for the Dayton Literary Peace Prize for fiction.

In 2022, he journeyed to Ukraine as a volunteer and later as a journalist to cover the Russian invasion. His February 2024 novel, Daybreak, is loosely informed by his experiences in Ukraine and follows an American military veteran into the war to find a former love. In an early review, Publishers Weekly wrote that "This harrowing account of life in a besieged Ukraine reads like a bulletin from the front," and said that Daybreak echoed of both Hemingway and Casablanca.

== Background and education ==
Gallagher was born in Reno, Nevada, to attorneys Deborah Scott Gallagher and Dennis Gallagher. He and his brother Luke attended Brookfield School and Bishop Manogue High School, where Matt edited the school newspaper and ran cross country and track. He graduated in 2001.

Gallagher then attended Wake Forest University in North Carolina. He joined Army ROTC the week before 9/11, and decided to honor this commitment after the September 11 attacks. While at Wake Forest, Gallagher was a member of Theta Chi fraternity and served as the sports editor of the Old Gold & Black. He graduated in 2005 with a Bachelor of Arts Degree, commissioning into the U.S. Army as a second lieutenant in the Armor Branch.

== Military service ==
Gallagher trained at Fort Knox, Kentucky, where he attended and graduated the Armor Officer Basic Course and Army Reconnaissance Course. He was subsequently assigned to the 2nd Brigade, 25th Infantry Division at Schofield Barracks, Hawaii. He deployed with this unit in 2007 as a scout platoon leader with 2–14 Cavalry to Saba al-Bor, a sectarian village northwest of Baghdad. He was promoted to the rank of captain in July 2008, and was then reassigned to 1–27 Infantry, part of the famed 27th Infantry Regiment, where he served as a targeting officer. He and his unit returned to Schofield Barracks in February 2009, and Gallagher left the Army later that year. He earned the Combat Action Badge during his deployment to Iraq.

=== Kaboom ===
While deployed to Iraq, Gallagher wrote about his experiences there on a military blog. Kaboom: A Soldier's War Journal was a popular blog from November 2007 to June 2008, before it was shut down by the writer's military chain-of-command. Gallagher went by the pseudonym of LT G, wrote about the front-line experiences in the Iraq War as a United States Army soldier. A scout platoon leader, LT G often incorporated the trials and tribulations of his platoon in his writings, offering a brash and brutally honest perspective of modern warfare. Kaboom was shut down, and subsequently deleted, after Gallagher made a post detailing his turning down of a promotion in an effort to stay with his soldiers.

Before Kaboom was shut down, it was one of the few military blogs to garner attention and press coverage from the print media. This can be attributed to LT G's literary writing style. In a nationally published story chronicling the rise and fall of Kaboom, LT G was revealed to be Gallagher, who had been promoted to captain soon after his blog was shut down.

== Writing career ==
After leaving the Army, Gallagher moved to New York City and wrote his war memoir, Kaboom: Embracing the Suck in a Savage Little War, which was published in April 2010 by Da Capo Press. It received much critical acclaim. Michiko Kakutani in The New York Times praised Gallagher for "his love of language, acquired as an avid reader, and his elastic voice as a writer – his ability to move effortlessly between the earnest and the irreverent, the thoughtful and the comic."

In The Wall Street Journal, Bing West wrote that "Understanding that comedy best captures the irony of the human condition, Mr. Gallagher pokes fun at himself, his soldiers and those above him ... Without a trace of sentimentality, Mr. Gallagher draws the reader into the everyday complexities of leading soldiers from every strata of American society ... Mr. Gallagher is too modest, and too ironic, to tout his own accomplishments, so I'll do it for him: He is a classic representative of the U.S. military, a force that imposed its will, both physical and moral, to shatter al Qaeda."

Post-Kaboom, Gallagher has written for a variety of magazines and publications, to include The Atlantic, Boston Review, The New York Times and Wired. He graduated from Columbia University with an MFA in fiction in 2013.

Gallagher and Roy Scranton co-edited Fire and Forget: Short Stories from the Long War (Da Capo, 2013), an anthology of literary fiction by veterans of Iraq and Afghanistan. Fire and Forget featured an introduction by National Book Award Winner Colum McCann, and stories by Colby Buzzell, David Abrams, Phil Klay, Siobhan Fallon, Gavin Kovite, Jacob Siegel, and others. The New York Daily News wrote that "Some of America's greatest works of literature have come from its wars. Be it Stephen Crane, E.L. Doctorow, Ernest Hemingway, Norman Mailer, Joseph Heller, Thomas Pynchon, James Jones or Tim O'Brien, war has been memorialized, glorified, satirized and revealed in all its valor and depredation ... Now, as another comes to a close, a new generation of authors will come forward to define themselves through their own fictional narratives. Among the finest have been enlisted in Fire and Forget."

Gallagher appeared on an episode of the new Lit Hub/Podglomerate Storybound (podcast), accompanied by original musical composition from singer-songwriter Colin Hogan.

== Youngblood ==
In September 2014, Atria/Simon & Schuster acquired Gallagher's first novel, Youngblood, from ICM Partners. Published February 2016, Youngblood received early endorsements from authors Richard Ford, Tim O'Brien, Ben Fountain, Claire Vaye Watkins and Phil Klay, among others, as well as starred reviews from trade publications Kirkus Reviews and Booklist. It was named an Amazon Best Book of the Month, selected to The Millions Most Anticipated of 2016, and chosen by iBooks as a "What We're Reading" selectee.

Reviewing for The New York Times, Michiko Kakutani wrote of Youngblood, "On one level, the novel is a parable – with overtones of Graham Greene's The Quiet American – about the United States and Iraq and the still unfurling consequences of the war ... Mr. Gallagher has a keen reportorial eye, a distinctive voice and an instinctive sympathy for the people he is writing about ... [This] is an urgent and deeply moving novel." In The Washington Post, Roxana Robinson called the novel ""Layered and complex ... [this is ] smart, fierce and important writing. In Youngblood, Matt Gallagher shows again how war works in the human heart."

The Daily Beast described Youngblood as "America's first great work of reckoning." And The Australian raved over the book, saying, ""Every so often a debut novel charges past the suburban stories tapped out in coffee shops and announces itself as a literary event. Matt Gallagher's Youngblood is one of these books ... [Gallagher's] descriptions of combat's aftermath – quiet and taught with pathos – remind me of Siegfried Sassoon. Violent, intelligent, and beautiful, Youngblood is one of the best novels to come out of America's 21st-century wars, with an authority that eclipses most debuts and a literary talent that announces a commanding writer."'

Youngblood has also received positive reviews or been featured in Esquire, The Wall Street Journal and Vogue, among others. Youngblood was selected as a finalist for the 2016 Dayton Literary Peace Prize for fiction.

== Empire City ==
Gallager's second novel, Empire City, received mixed reviews. Publishers Weekly called the book, which is set in an alternate present where the United States won the Vietnam War, "ambitious but flawed." Kirkus Reviews was far more positive, calling it "a keen extrapolation of a country launched down a radically altered historical continuum" and cited Gallagher's evolved and "elaborate" prose as a strength of the book.

Marine veteran Peter Lucier of The Strategy Bridge called the novel "a triumph," and argued it shouldn't be read as war literature but as part of a "much broader canon of American and [anti-]imperial literature ... a stunning, short-paragraphed powerhouse that is both eminently readable as a thriller but can also bear the weight of a deep, close reading of the symbolism, rich with interpretative possibility and bold style choices."

== Ukraine ==
In February 2022, as Russia's renewed invasion of Ukraine began, Gallagher joined fellow combat veterans Adrian Bonenberger and Benjamin Busch in the Ukrainian city of Lviv to voluntarily train a civilian defense force. Gallagher wrote about the experience for Esquire and the efforts of the three American volunteers were profiled by Anderson Cooper on CNN.

Gallagher later returned to Ukraine as a journalist with Busch in October and November 2022, and then again in August 2023. His long-form piece chronicling the volunteer and foreign-fighter movement for Esquire, "The Secret Weapons of Ukraine," received much acclaim. Longreads selected it as an editors' pick, describing it as "a reminder that in an age of geopolitical deceit and oil greed, there still exist people willing to take up arms in service of a democratic ideal. Add in the rich vignettes threaded throughout, and you've got a piece you'll likely not forget anytime soon."

== Select bibliography ==
=== Essays, reviews and stories ===
- "Pilgrim's Progress The New York Times, January 2011
- "One Man's Mad Journey to the Big Buck Hunter Championship," Wired, May 2015
- "Back Home Then, Back Home Now," Boston Globe, January 2016
- "Ernie and Me: Educations in Hemingway," The Paris Review, February 2016
- "Michael Herr: 1940 – 2016," The Paris Review, June 2016
- "Babylon," Playboy, July 2016
- "Know Your Enemy," Wired, December 2016
- "Iraq War Veteran Will Akuna Robinson: Trailblazing Superstar of Thru-Hiking", ESPN, November 2021
- "Leaving Afghanistan Behind", Esquire, October 2021
- "Notes from Lviv", Esquire, March 2022
- "Trespasses," BOMB, Summer 2022
- "The Secret Weapons of Ukraine", Esquire, February 2023
- "Peace Through Victory: The Grim Resolve of Ukraine's Citizen-Soldiers", Esquire, November 2023

=== Books ===
- Kaboom: Embracing the Suck in a Savage Little War, Da Capo Press, March 2010. ISBN 9780306818806
- Fire & Forget: Short Stories from the Long War [coeditor and contributor], Da Capo Press, February 2013. ISBN 9780306821769
- Youngblood: A Novel, Atria/Simon & Schuster, February 2016. ISBN 978-1501105746
- Empire City: A Novel, Atria/Simon & Schuster, April 2020. ISBN 978-1-5011-7779-8
- Daybreak: A Novel, Atria/Simon & Schuster, February 2024. ISBN 978-1-5011-7785-9
