= The Junior Officers' Reading Club =

Book by Patrick Hennessey

The Junior Officers' Reading Club: Killing Time and Fighting Wars
- First edition
- Author: Patrick Hennessey
- Publisher: Allen Lane
- Publication date: 2009
- Media type: Hardback
- ISBN: 978-0-14-103926-8

The Junior Officers' Reading Club: Killing Time and Fighting Wars is a 2009 book by Patrick Hennessey, a former officer in the Grenadier Guards.

It charts his military career, from training at Sandhurst through several campaigns including Iraq and Afghanistan. The book received positive reviews for its account of the realities of modern soldiering and warfare.

The book was serialised as the Book of the Week on BBC Radio 4 in June 2009. A sequel, Kandak, was written by Hennessey in 2012.

== Reading list ==
A version of the book published by Penguin Books with a new Afterword in 2010 details the books that were read in "The Junior Officers' Reading Club". The list is as follows:

Title	Author	ISBN
The Marsh Arabs	Wilfred Thesiger	ISBN 0-14-144208-5
Dispatches	Michael Herr	ISBN 978-0-330-25573-8
Chickenhawk	Robert Mason	ISBN 0-552-12419-2
Saddam Hussein: An American Obsession	Andrew Cockburn	ISBN 1-85984-422-7
The Utility of Force	Rupert Smith	ISBN 0-14-102044-X
On War	Carl von Clausewitz	ISBN 1-85326-482-2
Catch-22	Joseph Heller	ISBN 0-09-947046-2
Ice Cold in Alex	Christopher Landon	ISBN 978-0-304-36625-5
The Count of Monte Cristo	Alexandre Dumas	ISBN 1-85326-733-3
Don Quixote	Miguel de Cervantes	ISBN 0-09-946969-3
Kingdom of Fear	Hunter S. Thompson	ISBN 0-14-101422-9
A Confederacy of Dunces	John Kennedy Toole	ISBN 0-14-118286-5
The Day of the Locust	Nathanael West	ISBN 0-14-102365-1
The Rules of Attraction	Bret Easton Ellis	ISBN 0-330-53634-6
Glamorama	Bret Easton Ellis	ISBN 0-330-44799-8
Vile Bodies	Evelyn Waugh	ISBN 0-14-118287-3
Tristram Shandy	Laurence Sterne	ISBN 1-85326-291-9
