= Patrick Hennessey (barrister) =

- Born: 1982 (age 43–44)
- Military career
- Allegiance: United Kingdom
- Branch: British Army
- Service years: 2004-2009
- Rank: Captain
- Unit: Grenadier Guards
- Conflicts: Iraq War; Afghanistan
- Awards: Queen's Medal

Patrick Rupert Hennessey (born August 1982) is a British barrister, author, journalist and former British Army officer.

== Education ==
Hennessey was educated at Berkhamsted School and Balliol College, Oxford. He attended the Royal Military Academy Sandhurst in 2004, and was the winner of the Queen’s Medal on his commissioning course.

== Military career ==
From Sandhurst he was commissioned into the Grenadier Guards in January 2005. He was deployed to the Balkans, Africa, South East Asia, and the Falkland Islands, and saw active service in the Iraq War and Afghanistan. He retired from the army in 2009 with the rank of captain.

== Legal career ==
After training at BPP Law School, Hennessey qualified as a barrister in 2010. Since then he has been practising with 39 Essex Chambers, based in London.

== Media ==
Hennessey reported as a special foreign correspondent for The Times and has written numerous newspaper, magazine and journal articles in the UK and the USA.

He wrote and presented a documentary entitled Kipling’s Indian Adventure which was shown on BBC Two in February 2016. The programme looked into Rudyard Kipling's early life and career in India.

Hennessey has written two books, both of which are accounts of his time as a British Army officer.

He is a member of the Royal United Services Institute and is a regular media commentator on defence and legal matters.

=== Publications ===
- The Junior Officers’ Reading Club: Killing Time and Fighting Wars (2009)
- Kandak (2012)
