= List of United States representatives from Washington =

The following is an alphabetical list of United States representatives from the state of Washington. For chronological tables of members of both houses of the United States Congress from the state (through the present day), see Washington's congressional delegations. The list of names should be complete (as of January 3, 2025), but other data may be incomplete. It includes members who have represented both the state and the territory, both past and present.

== Current members ==
Updated January 3, 2025.

- 1st district: Suzan DelBene (D) (since 2012)
- 2nd district: Rick Larsen (D) (since 2001)
- 3rd district: Marie Gluesenkamp Perez (D) (since 2023)
- 4th district: Dan Newhouse (R) (since 2015)
- 5th district: Michael Baumgartner (R) (since 2025)
- 6th district: Emily Randall (D) (since 2025)
- 7th district: Pramila Jayapal (D) (since 2017)
- 8th district: Kim Schrier (D) (since 2019)
- 9th district: Adam Smith (D) (since 1997)
- 10th district: Marilyn Strickland (D) (since 2021)

== List of members ==
Members	Party	Years	District	Electoral history
Brock Adams	Democratic	January 3, 1965 – January 22, 1977	7th	Elected in 1964. Resigned to become U.S. Secretary of Transportation.
John B. Allen	Republican	March 4, 1889 – November 11, 1889	Territory	Elected in 1888. Retired to run for U.S. senator upon statehood.
James Patton Anderson	Democratic	March 4, 1855 – March 3, 1857	Territory	Elected in 1854. Retired.
Brian Baird	Democratic	January 3, 1999 – January 3, 2011	3rd	Elected in 1998. Retired.
Michael Baumgartner	Republican	January 3, 2025 – present	5th	Elected in 2024. Incumbent.
Don Bonker	Democratic	January 3, 1975 – January 3, 1989	3rd	Elected in 1974. Retired.
Thomas Hurley Brents	Republican	March 4, 1879 – March 3, 1885	Territory	Elected in 1878. Lost renomination.
James W. Bryan	Progressive	March 4, 1913 – March 3, 1915	At-large	Elected in 1912. Redistricted and lost renomination.
Maria Cantwell	Democratic	January 3, 1993 – January 3, 1995	1st	Elected in 1992. Lost re-election to White.
Rod Chandler	Republican	January 3, 1983 – January 3, 1993	8th	Elected in 1982. Retired to run for U.S. senator.
John M. Coffee	Democratic	January 3, 1937 – January 3, 1947	6th	Elected in 1936. Lost re-election to Tollefson.
George Edward Cole	Democratic	March 4, 1863 – March 3, 1865	Territory	Elected in 1862. Retired.
John E. Cunningham	Republican	May 17, 1977 – January 3, 1979	7th	Elected to finish Adams's term. Lost re-election to Lowry.
Francis W. Cushman	Republican	March 4, 1899 – March 3, 1909	At-large	Elected in 1898. Redistricted to the 2nd district.
Francis W. Cushman	Republican	March 4, 1909 – July 6, 1909	2nd	Redistricted from the at-large district and re-elected in 1908. Died.
Hugh De Lacy	Democratic	January 3, 1945 – January 3, 1947	1st	Elected in 1944. Lost re-election to H. Jones.
Suzan DelBene	Democratic	November 6, 2012 – present	1st	Elected to finish Inslee's term. Incumbent.
Arthur A. Denny	Republican	March 4, 1865 – March 3, 1867	Territory	Elected in 1864. Retired.
Norman D. Dicks	Democratic	January 3, 1977 – January 3, 2013	6th	Elected in 1976. Retired.
Clarence Dill	Democratic	March 4, 1915 – March 3, 1919	5th	Elected in 1914. Lost re-election to Webster.
William H. Doolittle	Republican	March 4, 1893 – March 3, 1897	At-large	Elected in 1892. Lost re-election to Lewis.
Jennifer Dunn	Republican	January 3, 1993 – January 3, 2005	8th	Elected in 1992. Retired.
Jacob Falconer	Progressive	March 4, 1913 – March 3, 1915	At-large	Elected in 1912. Retired to run for U.S. senator.
Alvan Flanders	Republican	March 4, 1867 – March 3, 1869	Territory	Elected in 1866. Retired.
Tom Foley	Democratic	January 3, 1965 – January 3, 1995	5th	Elected in 1964. Lost re-election to Nethercutt.
Selucius Garfielde	Republican	March 4, 1869 – March 3, 1873	Territory	Elected in 1868. Lost re-election to McFadden.
Marie Gluesenkamp Perez	Democratic	January 3, 2023 – present	3rd	Elected in 2022. Incumbent.
Lindley H. Hadley	Republican	March 4, 1915 – March 3, 1933	2nd	Elected in 1914. Lost re-election to Wallgren.
Julia Butler Hansen	Democratic	November 8, 1960 – December 31, 1974	3rd	Elected to finish Mack's term. Retired and resigned early.
Doc Hastings	Republican	January 3, 1995 – January 3, 2015	4th	Elected in 1994. Retired.
Denny Heck	Democratic	January 3, 2013 – January 3, 2021	10th	Elected in 2012. Retired to run for Lieutenant Governor.
Jaime Herrera Beutler	Republican	January 3, 2011 – January 3, 2023	3rd	Elected in 2010. Lost re-election to Gluesenkamp Perez.
Floyd Hicks	Democratic	January 3, 1965 – January 3, 1977	6th	Elected in 1964. Retired.
Knute Hill	Democratic	March 4, 1933 – January 3, 1943	4th	Elected in 1932. Lost re-election to Holmes.
Samuel B. Hill	Democratic	September 25, 1923 – June 25, 1936	5th	Elected to finish Dill's term. Resigned to become member of the U.S. Board of Tax Appeals.
Hal Holmes	Republican	January 3, 1943 – January 3, 1959	4th	Elected in 1942. Retired.
Walt Horan	Republican	January 3, 1943 – January 3, 1965	5th	Elected in 1942. Lost re-election to Foley.
Ralph Horr	Republican	March 4, 1931 – March 3, 1933	1st	Elected in 1930. Lost renomination to J.F. Miller.
William E. Humphrey	Republican	March 4, 1903 – March 3, 1909	At-large	Elected in 1902. Redistricted to the 1st district.
William E. Humphrey	Republican	March 4, 1909 – March 3, 1917	1st	Redistricted from the at-large district and re-elected in 1908. Retired to run for U.S. senator.
Samuel C. Hyde	Republican	March 4, 1895 – March 3, 1897	At-large	Elected in 1894. Lost re-election to W.C. Jones.
Jay Inslee	Democratic	January 3, 1993 – January 3, 1995	4th	Elected in 1992. Lost re-election to Hastings.
Jay Inslee	Democratic	January 3, 1999 – March 20, 2012	1st	Elected in 1998. Resigned to run for governor.
Henry M. Jackson	Democratic	January 3, 1941 – January 3, 1953	2nd	Elected in 1940. Retired to run for U.S. senator.
Orange Jacobs	Republican	March 4, 1875 – March 3, 1879	Territory	Elected in 1874. Retired.
Pramila Jayapal	Democratic	January 3, 2017 – present	7th	Elected in 2016. Incumbent.
Albert Johnson	Republican	March 4, 1913 – March 3, 1915	2nd	Elected in 1912. Redistricted to the 3rd district.
Albert Johnson	Republican	March 4, 1915 – March 3, 1933	3rd	Redistricted from the 2nd district and re-elected in 1914. Lost re-election to M. Smith.
Homer Jones	Republican	January 3, 1947 – January 3, 1949	1st	Elected in 1946. Lost re-election to Mitchell.
Wesley Livsey Jones	Republican	March 4, 1899 – March 3, 1909	At-large	Elected in 1898. Retired to run for U.S. senator.
William Carey Jones	Republican	March 4, 1897 – March 3, 1899	At-large	Elected in 1896. Lost re-election to W.L. Jones.
Derek Kilmer	Democratic	January 3, 2013 – January 3, 2025	6th	Elected in 2012. Retired.
Mike Kreidler	Democratic	January 3, 1993 – January 3, 1995	9th	Elected in 1992. Lost re-election to Tate.
William La Follette	Republican	March 4, 1911 – March 3, 1915	3rd	Elected in 1910. Redistricted to the 4th district.
William La Follette	Republican	March 4, 1915 – March 3, 1919	4th	Redistricted from the 3rd district and re-elected in 1914. Lost renomination to Summers.
Columbia Lancaster	Democratic	April 12, 1854 – March 3, 1855	Territory	Elected in April 1854. Lost renomination to Anderson.
Rick Larsen	Democratic	January 3, 2001 – present	2nd	Elected in 2000. Incumbent.
Charles H. Leavy	Democratic	January 3, 1937 – August 1, 1942	5th	Elected in 1936. Resigned to become judge of the U.S. District Court for the Western District of Washington.
J. Hamilton Lewis	Democratic	March 4, 1897 – March 3, 1899	At-large	Elected in 1896. Lost re-election to Cushman.
Wesley Lloyd	Democratic	March 3, 1933 – January 10, 1936	6th	Elected in 1932. Died.
Mike Lowry	Democratic	January 3, 1979 – January 3, 1989	7th	Elected in 1978. Retired to run for U.S. Senator.
Russell V. Mack	Republican	July 7, 1947 – March 28, 1960	3rd	Elected to finish Norman's term. Died.
Donald H. Magnuson	Democratic	January 3, 1953 – January 3, 1959	At-large	Elected in 1952. Redistricted to the 7th district.
Donald H. Magnuson	Democratic	January 3, 1959 – January 3, 1963	7th	Redistricted from the at-large district and re-elected in 1958. Lost re-election to Stinson.
Warren G. Magnuson	Democratic	January 3, 1937 – December 13, 1944	1st	Elected in 1936. Retired to run for U.S. senator and resigned when elected.
Catherine Dean May	Republican	January 3, 1959 – January 3, 1971	4th	Elected in 1958. Lost re-election to McCormack.
Mike McCormack	Democratic	January 3, 1971 – January 3, 1981	4th	Elected in 1970. Lost re-election to Morrison.
William W. McCredie	Republican	March 4, 1909 – March 3, 1911	2nd	Elected to finish Cushman's term. Lost renomination to Warburton.
Jim McDermott	Democratic	January 3, 1989 – January 3, 2017	7th	Elected in 1988. Retired.
Obadiah B. McFadden	Democratic	March 4, 1873 – March 3, 1875	Territory	Elected in 1872. Retired.
Cathy McMorris Rodgers	Republican	January 3, 2005 – January 3, 2025	5th	Elected in 2004. Retired.
Lloyd Meeds	Democratic	January 3, 1965 – January 3, 1979	2nd	Elected in 1964. Retired.
Jack Metcalf	Republican	January 3, 1995 – January 3, 2001	2nd	Elected in 1994. Retired.
John F. Miller	Republican	March 4, 1917 – March 3, 1931	1st	Elected in 1916. Lost renomination to Horr.
John Ripin Miller	Republican	January 3, 1985 – January 3, 1993	1st	Elected in 1984. Retired.
Hugh Mitchell	Democratic	January 3, 1949 – January 3, 1953	1st	Elected in 1948. Retired to run for governor.
Sid Morrison	Republican	January 3, 1981 – January 3, 1993	4th	Elected in 1980. Retired to run for governor.
George Nethercutt	Republican	January 3, 1995 – January 3, 2005	5th	Elected in 1994. Retired to run for U.S. senator.
Dan Newhouse	Republican	January 3, 2015 – present	4th	Elected in 2014. Incumbent.
Fred B. Norman	Republican	January 3, 1943 – January 3, 1945	3rd	Elected in 1942. Lost re-election to Savage.
Fred B. Norman	Republican	January 3, 1947 – April 18, 1947	3rd	Elected in 1946. Died.
Thomas Pelly	Republican	January 3, 1953 – January 3, 1973	1st	Elected in 1952. Retired.
Miles Poindexter	Republican	March 4, 1909 – March 3, 1911	3rd	Elected in 1908. Retired to run for U.S. senator.
Joel Pritchard	Republican	January 3, 1973 – January 3, 1985	1st	Elected in 1972. Retired.
Emily Randall	Democratic	January 3, 2025 – present	6th	Elected in 2024. Incumbent.
Dave Reichert	Republican	January 3, 2005 – January 3, 2019	8th	Elected in 2004. Retired.
Charles R. Savage	Democratic	January 3, 1945 – January 3, 1947	3rd	Elected in 1944. Lost re-election to Norman.
Kim Schrier	Democratic	January 3, 2019 – present	8th	Elected in 2018. Incumbent.
Adam Smith	Democratic	January 3, 1997 – present	9th	Elected in 1996. Incumbent.
Linda Smith	Republican	January 3, 1995 – January 3, 1999	3rd	Elected in 1994. Retired to run for U.S. senator.
Martin F. Smith	Democratic	March 4, 1933 – January 3, 1943	3rd	Elected in 1932. Lost re-election to Norman.
Isaac Stevens	Democratic	March 4, 1857 – March 3, 1861	Territory	Elected in 1856. Retired.
Marilyn Strickland	Democratic	January 3, 2021 – present	10th	Elected in 2020. Incumbent.
K. William Stinson	Republican	January 3, 1963 – January 3, 1965	7th	Elected in 1962. Lost re-election to Adams.
John W. Summers	Republican	March 4, 1919 – March 3, 1933	4th	Elected in 1918. Lost re-election to K. Hill.
Al Swift	Democratic	January 3, 1979 – January 3, 1995	2nd	Elected in 1978. Retired.
Randy Tate	Republican	January 3, 1995 – January 3, 1997	9th	Elected in 1994. Lost re-election to A. Smith.
Thor C. Tollefson	Republican	January 3, 1947 – January 3, 1965	6th	Elected in 1946. Lost re-election to Hicks.
Jolene Unsoeld	Democratic	January 3, 1989 – January 3, 1995	3rd	Elected in 1988. Lost re-election to L. Smith.
Charles Stewart Voorhees	Democratic	March 4, 1885 – March 3, 1889	Territory	Elected in 1884. Lost re-election to Allen.
William H. Wallace	Republican	March 4, 1861 – March 3, 1863	Territory	Elected in 1860. Retired.
Monrad Wallgren	Democratic	March 4, 1933 – December 19, 1940	2nd	Elected in 1932. Retired to run for U.S. senator and resigned when elected.
Stanton Warburton	Republican	March 4, 1911 – March 3, 1913	2nd	Elected in 1910. Lost renomination to Johnson.
J. Stanley Webster	Republican	March 4, 1919 – May 8, 1923	5th	Elected in 1918. Resigned to become judge of the U.S. District Court for the Eastern District of Washington.
Jack Westland	Republican	January 3, 1953 – January 3, 1965	2nd	Elected in 1952. Lost re-election to Meeds.
Rick White	Republican	January 3, 1995 – January 3, 1999	1st	Elected in 1994. Lost re-election to Inslee.
John L. Wilson	Republican	November 20, 1889 – February 18, 1895	At-large	Elected in 1889. Retired to run for U.S. senator and resigned when elected.
Marion Zioncheck	Democratic	March 4, 1933 – August 7, 1936	1st	Elected in 1932. Died.

== See also ==
- List of United States senators from Washington
- Washington's congressional delegations
- Washington's congressional districts
