= Washington's congressional delegations =

These are tables of congressional delegations from the state of Washington to the United States Senate and United States House of Representatives.

The current dean of the Washington delegation is Senator Patty Murray, having served in the Senate since 1993.

== United States Senate ==
Current U.S. senators from Washington
Washington CPVI (2025): D+10	Class I senator	Class III senator
Washington CPVI (2025): D+10	Maria Cantwell (Junior senator) (Edmonds)	Patty Murray (Senior senator) (Seattle)
Party	Democratic	Democratic
Incumbent since	January 3, 2001	January 3, 1993

Class I senator	Congress	Class III senator
John B. Allen (R)	51st (1889–1891)	Watson C. Squire (R)
John B. Allen (R)	52nd (1891–1893)	Watson C. Squire (R)
vacant	53rd (1893–1895)	Watson C. Squire (R)
John L. Wilson (R)	53rd (1893–1895)	Watson C. Squire (R)
John L. Wilson (R)	54th (1895–1897)	Watson C. Squire (R)
John L. Wilson (R)	55th (1897–1899)	George Turner (D)
Addison G. Foster (R)	56th (1899–1901)	George Turner (D)
Addison G. Foster (R)	57th (1901–1903)	George Turner (D)
Addison G. Foster (R)	58th (1903–1905)	Levi Ankeny (R)
Samuel H. Piles (R)	59th (1905–1907)	Levi Ankeny (R)
Samuel H. Piles (R)	60th (1907–1909)	Levi Ankeny (R)
Samuel H. Piles (R)	61st (1909–1911)	Wesley L. Jones (R)
Miles Poindexter (R)	62nd (1911–1913)	Wesley L. Jones (R)
Miles Poindexter (Prog)	63rd (1913–1915)	Wesley L. Jones (R)
Miles Poindexter (R)	64th (1915–1917)	Wesley L. Jones (R)
Miles Poindexter (R)	65th (1917–1919)	Wesley L. Jones (R)
Miles Poindexter (R)	66th (1919–1921)	Wesley L. Jones (R)
Miles Poindexter (R)	67th (1921–1923)	Wesley L. Jones (R)
Clarence Dill (D)	68th (1923–1925)	Wesley L. Jones (R)
Clarence Dill (D)	69th (1925–1927)	Wesley L. Jones (R)
Clarence Dill (D)	70th (1927–1929)	Wesley L. Jones (R)
Clarence Dill (D)	71st (1929–1931)	Wesley L. Jones (R)
Clarence Dill (D)	72nd (1931–1933)	Wesley L. Jones (R)
Clarence Dill (D)	72nd (1931–1933)	Elijah S. Grammer (R)
Clarence Dill (D)	73rd (1933–1935)	Homer Bone (D)
Lewis B. Schwellenbach (D)	74th (1935–1937)	Homer Bone (D)
Lewis B. Schwellenbach (D)	75th (1937–1939)	Homer Bone (D)
Lewis B. Schwellenbach (D)	76th (1939–1941)	Homer Bone (D)
Monrad Wallgren (D)	76th (1939–1941)	Homer Bone (D)
Monrad Wallgren (D)	77th (1941–1943)	Homer Bone (D)
Monrad Wallgren (D)	78th (1943–1945)	Homer Bone (D)
Monrad Wallgren (D)	78th (1943–1945)	Warren Magnuson (D)
Monrad Wallgren (D)	79th (1945–1947)	Warren Magnuson (D)
Hugh Mitchell (D)	79th (1945–1947)	Warren Magnuson (D)
Harry P. Cain (R)	79th (1945–1947)	Warren Magnuson (D)
Harry P. Cain (R)	80th (1947–1949)	Warren Magnuson (D)
Harry P. Cain (R)	81st (1949–1951)	Warren Magnuson (D)
Harry P. Cain (R)	82nd (1951–1953)	Warren Magnuson (D)
Henry M. Jackson (D)	83rd (1953–1955)	Warren Magnuson (D)
Henry M. Jackson (D)	84th (1955–1957)	Warren Magnuson (D)
Henry M. Jackson (D)	85th (1957–1959)	Warren Magnuson (D)
Henry M. Jackson (D)	86th (1959–1961)	Warren Magnuson (D)
Henry M. Jackson (D)	87th (1961–1963)	Warren Magnuson (D)
Henry M. Jackson (D)	88th (1963–1965)	Warren Magnuson (D)
Henry M. Jackson (D)	89th (1965–1967)	Warren Magnuson (D)
Henry M. Jackson (D)	90th (1967–1969)	Warren Magnuson (D)
Henry M. Jackson (D)	91st (1969–1971)	Warren Magnuson (D)
Henry M. Jackson (D)	92nd (1971–1973)	Warren Magnuson (D)
Henry M. Jackson (D)	93rd (1973–1975)	Warren Magnuson (D)
Henry M. Jackson (D)	94th (1975–1977)	Warren Magnuson (D)
Henry M. Jackson (D)	95th (1977–1979)	Warren Magnuson (D)
Henry M. Jackson (D)	96th (1979–1981)	Warren Magnuson (D)
Henry M. Jackson (D)	97th (1981–1983)	Slade Gorton (R)
Henry M. Jackson (D)	98th (1983–1985)	Slade Gorton (R)
Daniel J. Evans (R)	98th (1983–1985)	Slade Gorton (R)
Daniel J. Evans (R)	99th (1985–1987)	Slade Gorton (R)
Daniel J. Evans (R)	100th (1987–1989)	Brock Adams (D)
Slade Gorton (R)	101st (1989–1991)	Brock Adams (D)
Slade Gorton (R)	102nd (1991–1993)	Brock Adams (D)
Slade Gorton (R)	103rd (1993–1995)	Patty Murray (D)
Slade Gorton (R)	104th (1995–1997)	Patty Murray (D)
Slade Gorton (R)	105th (1997–1999)	Patty Murray (D)
Slade Gorton (R)	106th (1999–2001)	Patty Murray (D)
Maria Cantwell (D)	107th (2001–2003)	Patty Murray (D)
Maria Cantwell (D)	108th (2003–2005)	Patty Murray (D)
Maria Cantwell (D)	109th (2005–2007)	Patty Murray (D)
Maria Cantwell (D)	110th (2007–2009)	Patty Murray (D)
Maria Cantwell (D)	111th (2009–2011)	Patty Murray (D)
Maria Cantwell (D)	112th (2011–2013)	Patty Murray (D)
Maria Cantwell (D)	113th (2013–2015)	Patty Murray (D)
Maria Cantwell (D)	114th (2015–2017)	Patty Murray (D)
Maria Cantwell (D)	115th (2017–2019)	Patty Murray (D)
Maria Cantwell (D)	116th (2019–2021)	Patty Murray (D)
Maria Cantwell (D)	117th (2021–2023)	Patty Murray (D)
Maria Cantwell (D)	118th (2023–2025)	Patty Murray (D)
Maria Cantwell (D)	119th (2025–2027)	Patty Murray (D)
Maria Cantwell (D)	120th (2027–2029)	Patty Murray (D)
Class I senator	Congress	Class III senator

== U.S. House of Representatives ==
=== Current members ===
This is a list of members of the current Washington delegation in the U.S. House, along with their respective tenures in office, district boundaries, and district political ratings according to the CPVI. The delegation has a total of 10 members, including 8 Democrats and 2 Republicans.

District	Representative	Party	CPVI	Incumbency	District map
1st	Suzan DelBene (Medina)	Democratic	D+15	since November 13, 2012	
2nd	Rick Larsen (Everett)	Democratic	D+12	since January 3, 2001	
3rd	Marie Gluesenkamp Perez (Washougal)	Democratic	R+2	since January 3, 2023	
4th	Dan Newhouse (Sunnyside)	Republican	R+10	since January 3, 2015	
5th	Michael Baumgartner (Spokane)	Republican	R+5	since January 3, 2025	
6th	Emily Randall (Bremerton)	Democratic	D+10	since January 3, 2025	
7th	Pramila Jayapal (Seattle)	Democratic	D+39	since January 3, 2017	
8th	Kim Schrier (Sammamish)	Democratic	D+3	since January 3, 2019	
9th	Adam Smith (Bellevue)	Democratic	D+22	since January 3, 1997	
10th	Marilyn Strickland (Tacoma)	Democratic	D+9	since January 3, 2021	

=== Delegates from Washington Territory ===
The Washington Territory was created on March 2, 1853. Beginning with the 33rd United States Congress, it sent a non-voting delegate to the House.

Congress	Delegate
33rd (1853–1855)	Columbia Lancaster (D)
34th (1855–1857)	James Patton Anderson (D)
35th (1857–1859)	Isaac Stevens (D)
36th (1859–1861)	Isaac Stevens (D)
37th (1861–1863)	William H. Wallace (R)
38th (1863–1865)	George Edward Cole (D)
39th (1865–1867)	Arthur A. Denny (R)
40th (1867–1869)	Alvan Flanders (R)
41st (1869–1871)	Selucius Garfielde (R)
42nd (1871–1873)	Selucius Garfielde (R)
43rd (1873–1875)	Obadiah B. McFadden (D)
44th (1875–1877)	Orange Jacobs (R)
45th (1877–1879)	Orange Jacobs (R)
46th (1879–1881)	Thomas Hurley Brents (R)
47th (1881–1883)	Thomas Hurley Brents (R)
48th (1883–1885)	Thomas Hurley Brents (R)
49th (1885–1887)	Charles Stewart Voorhees (D)
50th (1887–1889)	Charles Stewart Voorhees (D)
51st (1889–1891)	John B. Allen (R)

=== Members from Washington after statehood ===
==== 1889–1913 ====
From 1889 to 1909, members were elected at-large statewide.

Congress	At-large seats		
Congress	Seat A	Seat B	Seat C
51st (1889–1891)	John L. Wilson (R)	Seat B	Seat C
52nd (1891–1893)	John L. Wilson (R)	Seat B	Seat C
53rd (1893–1895)	John L. Wilson (R)	William H. Doolittle (R)	Seat C
54th (1895–1897)	Samuel C. Hyde (R)	William H. Doolittle (R)	Seat C
55th (1897–1899)	William C. Jones (SvR)	J. Hamilton Lewis (D)	Seat C
56th (1899–1901)	Wesley L. Jones (R)	Francis W. Cushman (R)	Seat C
57th (1901–1903)	Wesley L. Jones (R)	Francis W. Cushman (R)	Seat C
58th (1903–1905)	Wesley L. Jones (R)	Francis W. Cushman (R)	William E. Humphrey (R)
59th (1905–1907)	Wesley L. Jones (R)	Francis W. Cushman (R)	William E. Humphrey (R)
60th (1907–1909)	Wesley L. Jones (R)	Francis W. Cushman (R)	William E. Humphrey (R)
Congress	1st district	2nd district	3rd district
61st (1909–1911)	William E. Humphrey (R)	Francis W. Cushman (R)	Miles Poindexter (R)
61st (1909–1911)	William E. Humphrey (R)	W. W. McCredie (R)	Miles Poindexter (R)
62nd (1911–1913)	William E. Humphrey (R)	Stanton Warburton (R)	William La Follette (R)

==== 1913–1933 ====
Congress	District				
Congress	1st	2nd	3rd	1st at-large seat	2nd at-large seat
63rd (1913–1915)	William E. Humphrey (R)	Albert; Johnson (R)	William; La Follette (R)	James W. Bryan (Prog)	Jacob; Falconer (Prog)
64th (1915–1917)	William E. Humphrey (R)	Lindley H. Hadley (R)	Albert; Johnson (R)	4th district	5th district
64th (1915–1917)	William E. Humphrey (R)	Lindley H. Hadley (R)	Albert; Johnson (R)	William; La Follette (R)	Clarence Dill (D)
65th (1917–1919)	John Franklin; Miller (R)	Lindley H. Hadley (R)	Albert; Johnson (R)	William; La Follette (R)	Clarence Dill (D)
66th (1919–1921)	John Franklin; Miller (R)	Lindley H. Hadley (R)	Albert; Johnson (R)	John W. Summers (R)	J. Stanley; Webster (R)
67th (1921–1923)	John Franklin; Miller (R)	Lindley H. Hadley (R)	Albert; Johnson (R)	John W. Summers (R)	J. Stanley; Webster (R)
68th (1923–1925)	John Franklin; Miller (R)	Lindley H. Hadley (R)	Albert; Johnson (R)	John W. Summers (R)	J. Stanley; Webster (R)
68th (1923–1925)	John Franklin; Miller (R)	Lindley H. Hadley (R)	Albert; Johnson (R)	John W. Summers (R)	Samuel B. Hill (D)
69th (1925–1927)	John Franklin; Miller (R)	Lindley H. Hadley (R)	Albert; Johnson (R)	John W. Summers (R)	Samuel B. Hill (D)
70th (1927–1929)	John Franklin; Miller (R)	Lindley H. Hadley (R)	Albert; Johnson (R)	John W. Summers (R)	Samuel B. Hill (D)
71st (1929–1931)	John Franklin; Miller (R)	Lindley H. Hadley (R)	Albert; Johnson (R)	John W. Summers (R)	Samuel B. Hill (D)
72nd (1931–1933)	Ralph Horr (R)	Lindley H. Hadley (R)	Albert; Johnson (R)	John W. Summers (R)	Samuel B. Hill (D)

==== 1933–1953 ====
Congress	District					
Congress	1st	2nd	3rd	4th	5th	6th
73rd (1933–1935)	Marion; Zioncheck (D)	Monrad; Wallgren (D)	Martin F. Smith (D)	Knute; Hill (D)	Samuel B. Hill (D)	Wesley; Lloyd (D)
74th (1935–1937)	Marion; Zioncheck (D)	Monrad; Wallgren (D)	Martin F. Smith (D)	Knute; Hill (D)	Samuel B. Hill (D)	Wesley; Lloyd (D)
75th (1937–1939)	Maggie; Magnuson (D)	Monrad; Wallgren (D)	Martin F. Smith (D)	Knute; Hill (D)	Charles H. Leavy (D)	John M. Coffee (D)
76th (1939–1941)	Maggie; Magnuson (D)	Monrad; Wallgren (D)	Martin F. Smith (D)	Knute; Hill (D)	Charles H. Leavy (D)	John M. Coffee (D)
77th (1941–1943)	Maggie; Magnuson (D)	Scoop; Jackson (D)	Martin F. Smith (D)	Knute; Hill (D)	Charles H. Leavy (D)	John M. Coffee (D)
78th (1943–1945)	Maggie; Magnuson (D)	Scoop; Jackson (D)	Fred B. Norman (R)	Hal; Holmes (R)	Walt; Horan (R)	John M. Coffee (D)
79th (1945–1947)	Hugh De Lacy (D)	Scoop; Jackson (D)	Charles R. Savage (D)	Hal; Holmes (R)	Walt; Horan (R)	John M. Coffee (D)
80th (1947–1949)	Homer Jones (R)	Scoop; Jackson (D)	Fred B. Norman (R)	Hal; Holmes (R)	Walt; Horan (R)	Thor C. Tollefson (R)
80th (1947–1949)	Homer Jones (R)	Scoop; Jackson (D)	Russell V. Mack (R)	Hal; Holmes (R)	Walt; Horan (R)	Thor C. Tollefson (R)
81st (1949–1951)	Hugh Mitchell (D)	Scoop; Jackson (D)	Russell V. Mack (R)	Hal; Holmes (R)	Walt; Horan (R)	Thor C. Tollefson (R)
82nd (1951–1953)	Hugh Mitchell (D)	Scoop; Jackson (D)	Russell V. Mack (R)	Hal; Holmes (R)	Walt; Horan (R)	Thor C. Tollefson (R)

==== 1953–1993 ====
Congress	District							
Congress	1st	2nd	3rd	4th	5th	6th	At-large seat	8th
83rd (1953–1955)	Thomas; Pelly (R)	Jack; Westland (R)	Russell V. Mack (R)	Hal Holmes (R)	Walt Horan (R)	Thor C. Tollefson (R)	Don; Magnuson (D)	8th
84th (1955–1957)	Thomas; Pelly (R)	Jack; Westland (R)	Russell V. Mack (R)	Hal Holmes (R)	Walt Horan (R)	Thor C. Tollefson (R)	Don; Magnuson (D)	8th
85th (1957–1959)	Thomas; Pelly (R)	Jack; Westland (R)	Russell V. Mack (R)	Hal Holmes (R)	Walt Horan (R)	Thor C. Tollefson (R)	Don; Magnuson (D)	8th
86th (1959–1961)	Thomas; Pelly (R)	Jack; Westland (R)	Russell V. Mack (R)	Catherine; Dean May (R)	Walt Horan (R)	Thor C. Tollefson (R)	7th district	8th
86th (1959–1961)	Thomas; Pelly (R)	Jack; Westland (R)	Russell V. Mack (R)	Catherine; Dean May (R)	Walt Horan (R)	Thor C. Tollefson (R)	Don; Magnuson (D)	8th
86th (1959–1961)	Thomas; Pelly (R)	Jack; Westland (R)	Julia Butler; Hansen (D)	Catherine; Dean May (R)	Walt Horan (R)	Thor C. Tollefson (R)	Don; Magnuson (D)	8th
87th (1961–1963)	Thomas; Pelly (R)	Jack; Westland (R)	Julia Butler; Hansen (D)	Catherine; Dean May (R)	Walt Horan (R)	Thor C. Tollefson (R)	Don; Magnuson (D)	8th
88th (1963–1965)	Thomas; Pelly (R)	Jack; Westland (R)	Julia Butler; Hansen (D)	Catherine; Dean May (R)	Walt Horan (R)	Thor C. Tollefson (R)	Bill Stinson (R)	8th
89th (1965–1967)	Thomas; Pelly (R)	Lloyd; Meeds (D)	Julia Butler; Hansen (D)	Catherine; Dean May (R)	Tom Foley (D)	Floyd Hicks (D)	Brock Adams (D)	8th
90th (1967–1969)	Thomas; Pelly (R)	Lloyd; Meeds (D)	Julia Butler; Hansen (D)	Catherine; Dean May (R)	Tom Foley (D)	Floyd Hicks (D)	Brock Adams (D)	8th
91st (1969–1971)	Thomas; Pelly (R)	Lloyd; Meeds (D)	Julia Butler; Hansen (D)	Catherine; Dean May (R)	Tom Foley (D)	Floyd Hicks (D)	Brock Adams (D)	8th
92nd (1971–1973)	Thomas; Pelly (R)	Lloyd; Meeds (D)	Julia Butler; Hansen (D)	Mike; McCormack (D)	Tom Foley (D)	Floyd Hicks (D)	Brock Adams (D)	8th
93rd (1973–1975)	Joel; Pritchard (R)	Lloyd; Meeds (D)	Julia Butler; Hansen (D)	Mike; McCormack (D)	Tom Foley (D)	Floyd Hicks (D)	Brock Adams (D)	8th
94th (1975–1977)	Joel; Pritchard (R)	Lloyd; Meeds (D)	Don Bonker (D)	Mike; McCormack (D)	Tom Foley (D)	Floyd Hicks (D)	Brock Adams (D)	8th
95th (1977–1979)	Joel; Pritchard (R)	Lloyd; Meeds (D)	Don Bonker (D)	Mike; McCormack (D)	Tom Foley (D)	Norm Dicks (D)	Brock Adams (D)	8th
95th (1977–1979)	Joel; Pritchard (R)	Lloyd; Meeds (D)	Don Bonker (D)	Mike; McCormack (D)	Tom Foley (D)	Norm Dicks (D)	Jack Cunningham (R)	8th
96th (1979–1981)	Joel; Pritchard (R)	Al Swift (D)	Don Bonker (D)	Mike; McCormack (D)	Tom Foley (D)	Norm Dicks (D)	Mike Lowry (D)	8th
97th (1981–1983)	Joel; Pritchard (R)	Al Swift (D)	Don Bonker (D)	Sid; Morrison (R)	Tom Foley (D)	Norm Dicks (D)	Mike Lowry (D)	8th
98th (1983–1985)	Joel; Pritchard (R)	Al Swift (D)	Don Bonker (D)	Sid; Morrison (R)	Tom Foley (D)	Norm Dicks (D)	Mike Lowry (D)	Rod; Chandler (R)
99th (1985–1987)	John; Miller (R)	Al Swift (D)	Don Bonker (D)	Sid; Morrison (R)	Tom Foley (D)	Norm Dicks (D)	Mike Lowry (D)	Rod; Chandler (R)
100th (1987–1989)	John; Miller (R)	Al Swift (D)	Don Bonker (D)	Sid; Morrison (R)	Tom Foley (D)	Norm Dicks (D)	Mike Lowry (D)	Rod; Chandler (R)
101st (1989–1991)	John; Miller (R)	Al Swift (D)	Jolene; Unsoeld (D)	Sid; Morrison (R)	Tom Foley (D)	Norm Dicks (D)	Jim; McDermott (D)	Rod; Chandler (R)
102nd (1991–1993)	John; Miller (R)	Al Swift (D)	Jolene; Unsoeld (D)	Sid; Morrison (R)	Tom Foley (D)	Norm Dicks (D)	Jim; McDermott (D)	Rod; Chandler (R)

==== 1993–present ====
Congress	District									
Congress	1st	2nd	3rd	4th	5th	6th	7th	8th	9th	10th
103rd (1993–1995)	Maria Cantwell (D)	Al Swift (D)	Jolene Unsoeld (D)	Jay Inslee (D)	Tom Foley (D)	Norm Dicks (D)	Jim; McDermott (D)	Jennifer; Dunn (R)	Mike Kreidler (D)	
104th (1995–1997)	Rick White (R)	Jack Metcalf (R)	Linda Smith (R)	Doc Hastings (R)	George; Nethercutt (R)	Norm Dicks (D)	Jim; McDermott (D)	Jennifer; Dunn (R)	Randy Tate (R)	
105th (1997–1999)	Rick White (R)	Jack Metcalf (R)	Linda Smith (R)	Doc Hastings (R)	George; Nethercutt (R)	Norm Dicks (D)	Jim; McDermott (D)	Jennifer; Dunn (R)	Adam Smith (D)	
106th (1999–2001)	Jay Inslee (D)	Jack Metcalf (R)	Brian Baird (D)	Doc Hastings (R)	George; Nethercutt (R)	Norm Dicks (D)	Jim; McDermott (D)	Jennifer; Dunn (R)	Adam Smith (D)	
107th (2001–2003)	Jay Inslee (D)	Rick Larsen (D)	Brian Baird (D)	Doc Hastings (R)	George; Nethercutt (R)	Norm Dicks (D)	Jim; McDermott (D)	Jennifer; Dunn (R)	Adam Smith (D)	
108th (2003–2005)	Jay Inslee (D)	Rick Larsen (D)	Brian Baird (D)	Doc Hastings (R)	George; Nethercutt (R)	Norm Dicks (D)	Jim; McDermott (D)	Jennifer; Dunn (R)	Adam Smith (D)	
109th (2005–2007)	Jay Inslee (D)	Rick Larsen (D)	Brian Baird (D)	Doc Hastings (R)	Cathy McMorris; Rodgers (R)	Norm Dicks (D)	Jim; McDermott (D)	Dave Reichert (R)	Adam Smith (D)	
110th (2007–2009)	Jay Inslee (D)	Rick Larsen (D)	Brian Baird (D)	Doc Hastings (R)	Cathy McMorris; Rodgers (R)	Norm Dicks (D)	Jim; McDermott (D)	Dave Reichert (R)	Adam Smith (D)	
111th (2009–2011)	Jay Inslee (D)	Rick Larsen (D)	Brian Baird (D)	Doc Hastings (R)	Cathy McMorris; Rodgers (R)	Norm Dicks (D)	Jim; McDermott (D)	Dave Reichert (R)	Adam Smith (D)	
112th (2011–2013)	Jay Inslee (D)	Rick Larsen (D)	Jamie Herrera; Beutler (R)	Doc Hastings (R)	Cathy McMorris; Rodgers (R)	Norm Dicks (D)	Jim; McDermott (D)	Dave Reichert (R)	Adam Smith (D)	
112th (2011–2013)	Suzan; DelBene (D)	Rick Larsen (D)	Jamie Herrera; Beutler (R)	Doc Hastings (R)	Cathy McMorris; Rodgers (R)	Norm Dicks (D)	Jim; McDermott (D)	Dave Reichert (R)	Adam Smith (D)	
113th (2013–2015)	Suzan; DelBene (D)	Rick Larsen (D)	Jamie Herrera; Beutler (R)	Doc Hastings (R)	Cathy McMorris; Rodgers (R)	Derek Kilmer (D)	Jim; McDermott (D)	Dave Reichert (R)	Adam Smith (D)	Denny Heck (D)
114th (2015–2017)	Suzan; DelBene (D)	Rick Larsen (D)	Jamie Herrera; Beutler (R)	Dan; Newhouse (R)	Cathy McMorris; Rodgers (R)	Derek Kilmer (D)	Jim; McDermott (D)	Dave Reichert (R)	Adam Smith (D)	Denny Heck (D)
115th (2017–2019)	Suzan; DelBene (D)	Rick Larsen (D)	Jamie Herrera; Beutler (R)	Dan; Newhouse (R)	Cathy McMorris; Rodgers (R)	Derek Kilmer (D)	Pramila; Jayapal (D)	Dave Reichert (R)	Adam Smith (D)	Denny Heck (D)
116th (2019–2021)	Suzan; DelBene (D)	Rick Larsen (D)	Jamie Herrera; Beutler (R)	Dan; Newhouse (R)	Cathy McMorris; Rodgers (R)	Derek Kilmer (D)	Pramila; Jayapal (D)	Kim Schrier (D)	Adam Smith (D)	Denny Heck (D)
117th (2021–2023)	Suzan; DelBene (D)	Rick Larsen (D)	Jamie Herrera; Beutler (R)	Dan; Newhouse (R)	Cathy McMorris; Rodgers (R)	Derek Kilmer (D)	Pramila; Jayapal (D)	Kim Schrier (D)	Adam Smith (D)	Marilyn; Strickland (D)
118th (2023–2025)	Suzan; DelBene (D)	Rick Larsen (D)	Marie Gluesenkamp; Perez (D)	Dan; Newhouse (R)	Cathy McMorris; Rodgers (R)	Derek Kilmer (D)	Pramila; Jayapal (D)	Kim Schrier (D)	Adam Smith (D)	Marilyn; Strickland (D)
119th (2025–2027)	Suzan; DelBene (D)	Rick Larsen (D)	Marie Gluesenkamp; Perez (D)	Dan; Newhouse (R)	Michael Baumgartner (R)	Emily Randall (D)	Pramila; Jayapal (D)	Kim Schrier (D)	Adam Smith (D)	Marilyn; Strickland (D)
120th (2027–2029)	Suzan; DelBene (D)	Rick Larsen (D)	Marie Gluesenkamp; Perez (D)	Amanda McKinney (R)	Michael Baumgartner (R)	Emily Randall (D)	Pramila; Jayapal (D)	Kim Schrier (D)	Adam Smith (D)	Marilyn; Strickland (D)

== Key ==
Democratic (D)
Progressive (Bull Moose) (Prog)
Republican (R)
Silver Republican (SvR)

== See also ==
- List of United States congressional districts
- Washington's congressional districts
- Political party strength in Washington (state)
