= John Denny (disambiguation) =

John Denny (born 1952) is an American former baseball player.

John Denny may also refer to:

- John Denny (Medal of Honor) (c. 1846 – 1901), U.S. Army soldier
- John Denny (politician) (1793–1875), American politician
- John McAusland Denny (1858–1922), Scottish politician

== See also ==
- John Denney (born 1978), American football player
