= Selucius Garfielde =

American politician

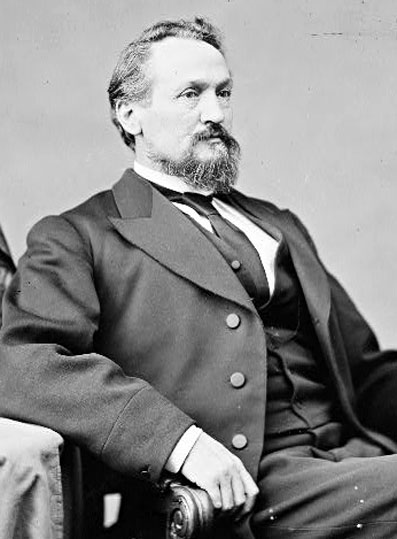

Delegate to the U.S. House of Representatives from Washington Territory's at-large district
- In office March 4, 1869 – March 3, 1873
- Preceded by: Alvan Flanders
- Succeeded by: Obadiah B. McFadden

Personal details
- Born: December 8, 1822 Shoreham, Vermont
- Died: April 13, 1883 (aged 60) Washington, D.C.
- Party: Republican

Selucius Garfielde (December 8, 1822 – April 13, 1883) was an American lawyer and politician who was a delegate to the United States House of Representatives from the Territory of Washington for two terms, serving from 1869 to 1873.

== Early life ==
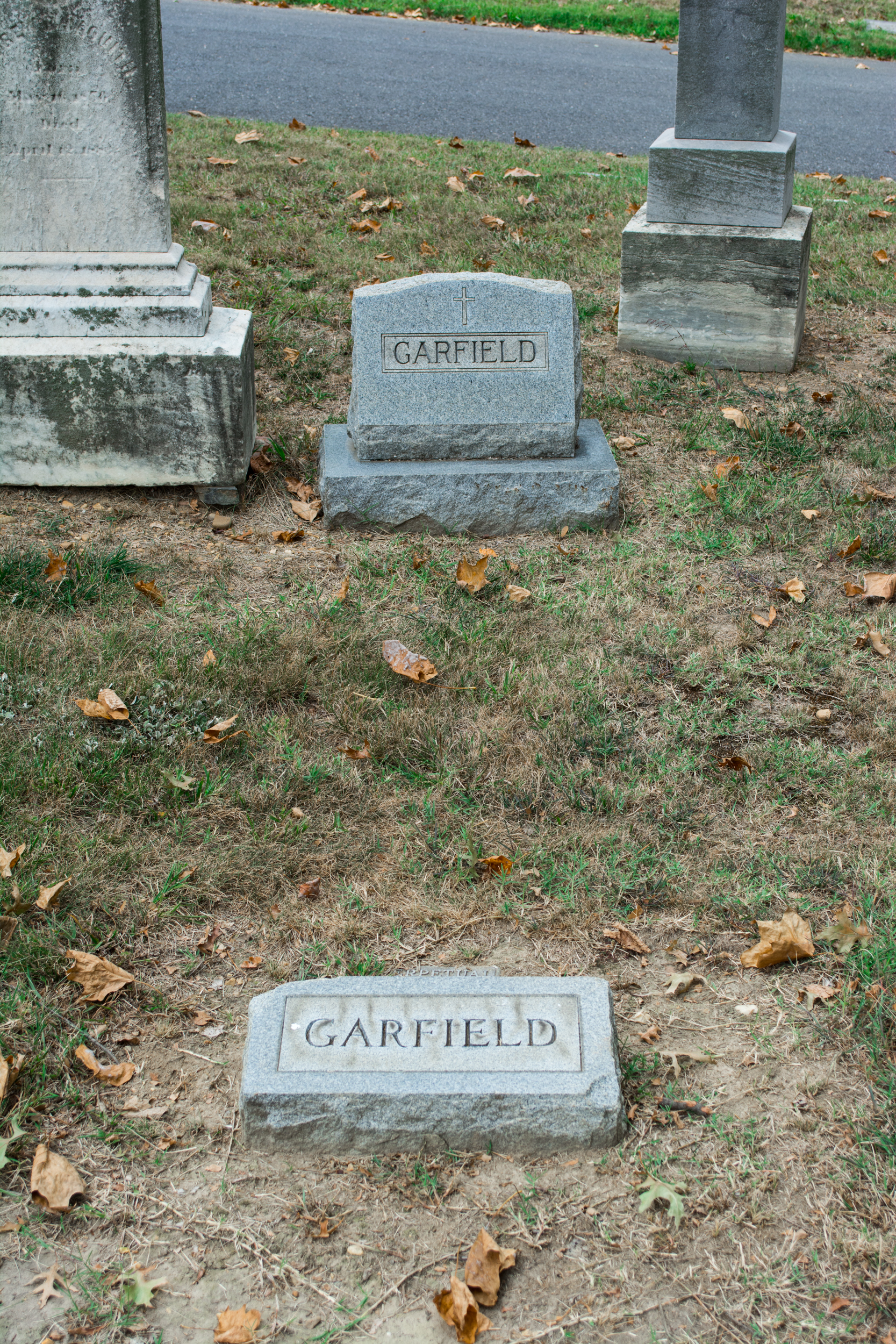
Grave of Selucius Garfielde at Glennwood Cemetery in Washington, D.C.

Garfielde (Note: He insisted on adding the "e" to the end of his name.) was born in Shoreham, Vermont, on December 8, 1822. At some point in his life, Garfielde moved to Gallipolis, Ohio, and then to Paris, Kentucky. Sources say his relocation occurred "in early life", although whether this means in early childhood or in his late teens is unclear. He was educated in the public schools (where is unclear), and then graduated with a bachelor's degree from Augusta College. To earn money, he taught in public schools both before and after college.

Garfielde became a reporter in Kentucky, and in 1849 was elected to the Kentucky Constitutional Convention as a delegate from Fleming County. He traveled throughout South America in 1850 before finally settling in California in 1851. Upon his arrival, he was seriously ill and almost penniless. But he quickly recovered both his financial and physical health. In 1852, Garfielde was elected to the California State Assembly as a Democrat from El Dorado County. He served a single term, from January 3 to May 19, 1853. Garfielde was appointed by the legislature to codify the laws of the state in 1853. During his tenure as a legislator, Garfielde became friends with Frederick H. Billings, a fellow attorney.

While serving in the legislature, Garfielde studied law. (Note: The 1887 congressional biography and Ullery et al. and say Garfielde studied law in Kentucky and was admitted to the Kentucky State Bar in 1849. However, Hines points out that Garfielde studied law alongside Thomas Melburne Reed in California, indicating the more likely date for Garfielde's legal education was 1853.) He was admitted to the State Bar of California in 1854, and established a legal practice in San Francisco. Garfielde married Sarah Electa Perry, also a native of Shoreham, Vermont, in October 1853. The couple had several children, including William Chase Garfield (no "e"), born in Kentucky in 1854, and Henry Stevens Garfield (no "e"), born in January 1860. (Note: Henry later became a physician and a leading citizen of the state of Oregon.) The couple's second child, Mollie, died in November 1859 after just a few weeks of life. The couple's sixth child, Charles Darwin Garfield (no "e"), was born in February 1867 and became a widely known fur trader in Alaska. He died in Seattle, Washington, in September 1961. (Note: Other children may have included Alice (born 1862; died 1867), Leila (born 1864; died 1931), Benjamin (born 1870; died 1887), Guy (born 1872; died 1942), and Ralph (born 1874; died 1889).)

== Campaign of 1856 and Washington Territory ==
It is probable that Garfielde returned to Kentucky in 1854. (Note: The U.S. Customs Service and a 1989 congressional biography both say Garfielde returned to Kentucky in 1855. This seems unlikely, as his first child was born in Kentucky in 1854.) Active in Democratic politics, he was elected a delegate to the Democratic National Convention in 1856, where he became a supporter of Senator Stephen A. Douglas. Douglas lost the Democratic nomination to James Buchanan. Garfielde proved a loyal Democratic, however. During the election, Garfielde traveled heavily through what were then the western and northwestern states, delivering thousands of public speeches in support of Buchanan. He earned a wide reputation as a "captivating" public speaker. His service on the campaign trail left Kentucky Democrats feeling deeply in his debt.

Buchanan proved grateful to Garfielde for his campaign efforts, and appointed him Receiver of Public Monies for the Land Office in the Washington Territory. Garfielde emigrated to Olympia, Washington Territory, that spring. Almost immediately, he became a supporter of Isaac Stevens, then campaigning for election as Washington Territory's first Territorial Delegate to Congress. When Stevens ran for re-election in 1858, Garfielde abandoned him early in the campaign. He feared that Stevens would lose the general election, jeopardizing Garfielde's position at the land office. By 1859, Garfielde's political views had shifted. A staunch Unionist, Garfielde (still a Democrat) now allied himself with the newly formed Republican Party. William Winlock Miller, a former prominent federal official in the Oregon Territory who had become an important businessman in the region, advised Stevens to deprive Garfielde of his land office position. Stevens attempted to do so in January 1860. But Democrats in Kentucky rallied to Garfielde's defense, forcing Stevens to hold off. By late May, however, Garfielde's support had withered in light of his pro-Republican activities, and Stevens was able to block Garfielde's reappointment. Garfielde's term as receiver of public moneys ended on August 16, 1860.

Garfielde sought the Democratic Party nomination for Territorial Delegate in 1861. Stevens saw unification of the Democratic Party as the only solution to the national crisis over slavery, which was threatening to tear the United States apart. Garfielde, however, broke with pro-secession Democrats, putting him at odds with Stevens. At the Democratic Party's territorial convention, pro-Union forces obtained a ruling from the chair that proxy votes could not be counted. This heavily damaged Stevens' chances for renomination as Territorial Delegate. After two rounds of balloting, some of Stevens' supporters became disgusted with their treatment by the chair and walked out. His candidacy crippled, Isaac Stevens withdrew his name from contention. The convention then split, with pro-Union forces nominating Garfielde and pro-secession forces nominating territorial judge Edward Lander. Republicans, meanwhile, nominated attorney William H. Wallace. Garfielde and Lander spent the campaign attacking one another, and on election day Wallace won election to Congress with 43 percent of the vote. Garfielde had 37.6 percent, and Lander 19.4 percent.

== Creating Idaho Territory ==
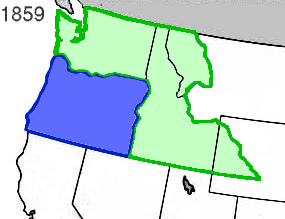
The Washington Territory in 1862.

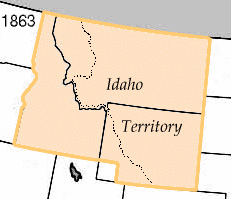
The Idaho Territory, after its organization in 1863.

Garfielde next played a direct role in the organization of the Idaho Territory. The Washington Territory had originally been part of the vast Oregon Territory. But massive population growth north of the Columbia River led to a divergence of interests between the northern southern parts of the territory. In 1853, the Washington Territory was split from the Oregon Territory. In 1859, Oregon was admitted as a U.S. state. That portion of the Oregon Territory not admitted as a state became part of the Washington Territory. That same year, gold was discovered in Idaho. By 1861, the cities of Pierce and Oro Fino in the Idaho panhandle each had twice the population of either Olympia or Vancouver on the Pacific coast. Major silver lodes were discovered that year at Silver City and Idaho City, leading to even greater population growth. Calls for local control of economic and political affairs grew stronger. In December 1861, the Washington Territory organized Idaho County and Nez Perce County out of the larger Shoshone County. Sentiment was growing that the economic interests of the mining area of Idaho increasingly lacked commonality with the shipping and timber interests of Washington.

In the summer of 1862, Selucius Garfielde helped to create the Idaho Territory. During the Washington Territorial Delegate election in 1861, each candidate for office had pledged that if he were elected he would work for the creation of a new territory. In the summer of 1862, William H. Wallace called a conference of leading men at Oro Fino. Among them were Garfielde; Dr. Anson G. Henry, a physician and land surveyor; and George "Growler" Walker, an influential carpenter from Silver City. At what became known as the Oro Fino Conference, the group decided to seek organization of the Idaho Territory out of the eastern part of the Washington Territory and the western half of the Dakota Territory (which had been organized in 1861). The group's chances were good, as Dr. Henry had treated Abraham Lincoln for depression in 1841 and had remained Lincoln's good friend ever since. With Lincoln now president, Henry made the pitch for a new Idaho Territory. Lincoln agreed, and the new territory was duly organized by Congress on March 4, 1863.

== Washington Territorial politics ==
During most of the period from 1862 to 1864, Garfielde lived in British Columbia, Canada.

Garfielde switched political parties, becoming a Republican some time between November 1861 and January 1864. Garfielde continued to practice law, but he also continued to be actively involved in politics. In the Territorial Delegate election of 1864, he stumped throughout the territory for Republican candidate Arthur A. Denny. By 1865, Garfielde could be counted among the top Republican contenders for any office he chose. In 1866, the Republicans denied Denny the nomination, choosing instead Alvan Flanders. Garfielde's popularity was such that, at the beginning of the convention, even he received a few votes to be the party nominee.

President Andrew Johnson appointed him surveyor general of Washington Territory in 1866, and he served in that position until early 1869. Garfielde continued to have outside interests as well. About 1868, Garfielde joined with Daniel Bagley, P.H. Lewis, Josiah Settle, and George F. Whitworth to buy up several abandoned coal mining claims east of Seattle. They formed the Lake Washington Company, and won passage of legislation in the state legislature creating the Coal Creek Road Company. The road firm's goal was to build a road east to the coal fields. In 1870, the owners sold out to new investors, reaping a profit of 500 percent.

In 1868, Garfielde sought and won the Republican Party's nomination for Territorial Delegate. His nomination was not without problems. Garfielde's inconstant political views and his flowery oratory had alienated many, who felt he was a political opportunist. They nicknamed him "Selucius the Babbler". Opposition to Garfielde's nomination was so strong that Alvan Flanders, the incumbent Territorial Delegate who had been denied renomination, and Christopher C. Hewitt, Chief Justice of the Washington Territorial Supreme Court, distributed a circular declaring the state Republican Party near collapse. They and the other signatories to the circular (which numbered more than 50 prominent Republicans) declared the party nomination process fraudulent and demanded radical reorganization of the party machinery. These and other accusations led to a significant backlash against the disaffected Republicans, who quickly retreated from their positions and declined to nominate their own candidate. The damage done, however, was significant. Garfielde won election over Marshall F. Moore by just 149 votes out of more than 5,300 cast. Due to a change in the date of the election, Garfielde's term of office lasted nearly three years. He began serving on March 4, 1869, but the House declined to seat him until December 1870. Garfielde won re-election to Congress in 1870 over Walla Walla Democrat J.D. Mix by a more comfortable 735 votes out of more than 6,200 cast.

Garfielde lost re-election to Congress in 1872. Garfielde's desire to make money on outside business interests did not abate during his tenure in Congress. In 1871, Jay Cooke, the investment banker who controlled the Northern Pacific Railway (NP), hired Garfielde to stump throughout the Washington Territory to promote the railway's interests among voters. Cooke hired Garfielde, in part, because he believed this would please Frederick Billings, then the head of the NP's land office. But Billings heartily disliked Garfield, accusing him of being "too much of a politician" and arguing that it was unseemly for a sitting member of Congress to engage in such blatant promotion of a specific business interest. Billings also believed that Garfielde had allied himself too closely to independent loggers who routinely stolen timber from NP forest lands. Garfielde believed his work for the railway and the loggers would win him the votes he needed for re-election. But Garfielde did not count on the massive influx of new voters into the Washington Territory, most of whom were Democrats. Garfielde was defeated in 1872 in his bid for a third term by Democrat Obadiah Benton McFadden by 761 votes out of 7,700 cast. He left office on March 3, 1873.

Garfielde remained influential in Republican politics, however. President Ulysses S. Grant, elected to a second term as President in November 1872, appointed him customs collector for the Puget Sound District on March 26, 1873. Garfielde left Washington, D.C., and moved to Seattle where he engaged in the practice of law and served as customs collector until June 22, 1874.

== Washington, D.C., and death ==
Garfielde returned to Washington, D.C., shortly after losing his customs job. (Note: In 1879, The Washington Post reported that he had established gambling rooms "some years earlier", which would place his arrival in the city about 1875 or 1876.) He established several gambling parlors in the city, and although frequently raided he never served jail time.

Garfielde had long exhibited a number of habits, many of which—like gambling, heavy drinking, and womanizing—were considered bad if not outright immoral by good citizens of the day. By the late 1870s, Sarah Garfielde had had enough, and the couple divorced about 1879. (Note: Sarah married Daniel Varner of Olympia, Washington, in April 1880. The couple had three children.)

Garfielde did not live long after his divorce. He married Nellie Homer, proprietress of a bar for the criminal element and down-and-out, in late 1881. Garfielde fell ill with both pleurisy and pneumonia in April 1883. He began deteriorating quickly on April 11, and died at his home at 410 10th Street NW at 5:30 p.m. on April 13. He was interred at Glenwood Cemetery. Although he was a Freemason and past Grand Master of the Grand Lodge of Washington Territory, Masonic rites were not observed at his funeral as he had not affiliated with any lodge in the D.C. area.

== Bibliography ==
- Allen, Don A. (1965). Legislative Sourcebook: The California Legislature and Reapportionment, 1849-1965. Sacramento: Assembly of the State of California.
- Bagley, Clarence (1929). History of King County, Washington. Chicago: S.J. Clarke Publishing Co.
- Bancroft, Hubert Howe; Victor, Frances Fuller (1890). History of Washington, Idaho, and Montana: 1845-1889. San Francisco: History Co. p. 205. "Garfielde 1857 receiver public."
- Blankenship, Georgiana Mitchell (1914). Early History of Thurston County, Washington Together With Biographies and Reminiscences of Those Identified With Pioneer Days. Olympia, Wash.: Georgiana Mitchell Blankenship.
- Bradbury, John H. (2014). Frontier History Along Idaho's Clearwater River: Pioneers, Miners and Lumberjacks. Charleston, S.C.: History Press. ISBN 9781626197091.
- Cleveland, J.F. (1871). The Tribune Almanac and Political Register. New York: The Tribune Association.
- Cutter, Daniel B. (1881). History of the Town of Jaffrey, New Hampshire, From the Date of the Masonian Charter to the Present Time, 1749-1880; With a Genealogical Register of the Jaffrey Families, and an Appendix Containing the Proceedings of the Centennial Celebration in 1873. Concord, N.H.: Republican Press Association. p. 265. "Selucius Garfield Vermont."
- Evans, Elwood (1889). History of the Pacific Northwest: Oregon and Washington. Portland, Ore.: North Pacific History Co. p. 510. "Garfielde 1856 Democratic Convention."
- Gaston, Joseph (1912). The Centennial History of Oregon, 1811-1912. Chicago: S.J. Clarke.
- Grant, Frederic James (1891). History of Seattle, Washington, With Illustrations and Biographical Sketches of Some of Its Prominent Men and Pioneers. New York: American Publishing and Engraving. ISBN 9780598280718.
- Hines, H.K. (1893). An Illustrated History of the State of Washington, Containing Biographical Mention of Its Pioneers and Prominent Citizens. Chicago: Lewis Publishing Co. p. 612. "Garfielde Kentucky 1855."
- Jordan, Grace Edgington (1963). The Idaho Reader. Boise: Syms-York.
- Kentucky Constitutional Convention (1849). Journal and Proceedings of the Convention of the State of Kentucky. Frankfort, Ky.: A.G. Hodges & Co.
- Lang, William L. (2014). Confederacy of Ambition: William Winlock Miller and the Making of Washington Territory. Seattle: University of Washington Press. ISBN 9780295993850.
- Langley, Henry G.; Morison, Samuel A. (1859). California State Register and Year Book of Facts: For the Year 1859. San Francisco: Commercial Steam Printing Establishment.
- Lyman, William Denison (1918). Lyman's History of Old Walla Walla County: Embracing Walla Walla, Columbia, Garfield and Asotin Counties. Chicago: S.J. Clarke Publishing Co. p. 144. "Garfielde ."
- Olson, Jerry (March 30, 2014). GLO Surveyor Personal Notes (PDF) (Report). Washington Department of Archaeology and Historic Preservation.
- Poore, Benjamin Perley (1871). Congressional Directory for the Third Session of the Forty-First United States Congress of the United States of America. 2d ed. Washington, D.C.: Government Printing Office.
- Ragsdale, Bruce A.; Jacob, Kathryn Allamong (1989). Biographical Directory of the United States Congress, 1774-1989. Washington, D.C.: U.S. Government Printing Office.
- Ritter, Charles F.; Wakelyn, Jon L. (1989). American Legislative Leaders, 1850-1910. New York: Greenwood Press. ISBN 0313239436.
- Taylor, Joseph Marion (1898). History and Government of Washington: To Which Are Appended the Constitution of the State of Washington and Lists of Territorial and State Officers. St. Louis: Becktold Printing and Book Mfg. Co. p. 57. "Garfielde 1870 Mix."
- Ullery, Jacob G.; Proctor, Redfield; Davenport, Charles H.; Huse, Hiram Augustus; Fuller, Levi K. (1894). Men of Vermont: An Illustrated Biographical History of Vermonters and Sons of Vermont. Brattleboro, Vt.: Transcript Publishing Company. "Garfielde Kentucky 1855."
- United States Congress (1887). Journal of the Executive Proceedings of the Senate of the United States of America, From December 6, 1858, to August 6, 1861, Exclusive. Volume XI. Washington, D.C.: Senate of the United States.
- United States Customs Service (1986). A Biographical Directory of the United States Customs Service, 1771-1989. Washington, D.C.: U.S. Customs Service. hdl:2027/mdp.39015056572772.
- Winks, Robin W. (1998). Frederick Billings: A Life. Berkeley, Calif.: University of California Press. ISBN 0520214978.

U.S. House of Representatives
Preceded by Alvan Flanders	Delegate to the U.S. House of Representatives from Washington Territory; 1869-1873	Succeeded by Obadiah B. McFadden
