= Salem Memorial Park =

Jewish cemetery in Colma, San Mateo County, California

Salem Memorial Park and Garden
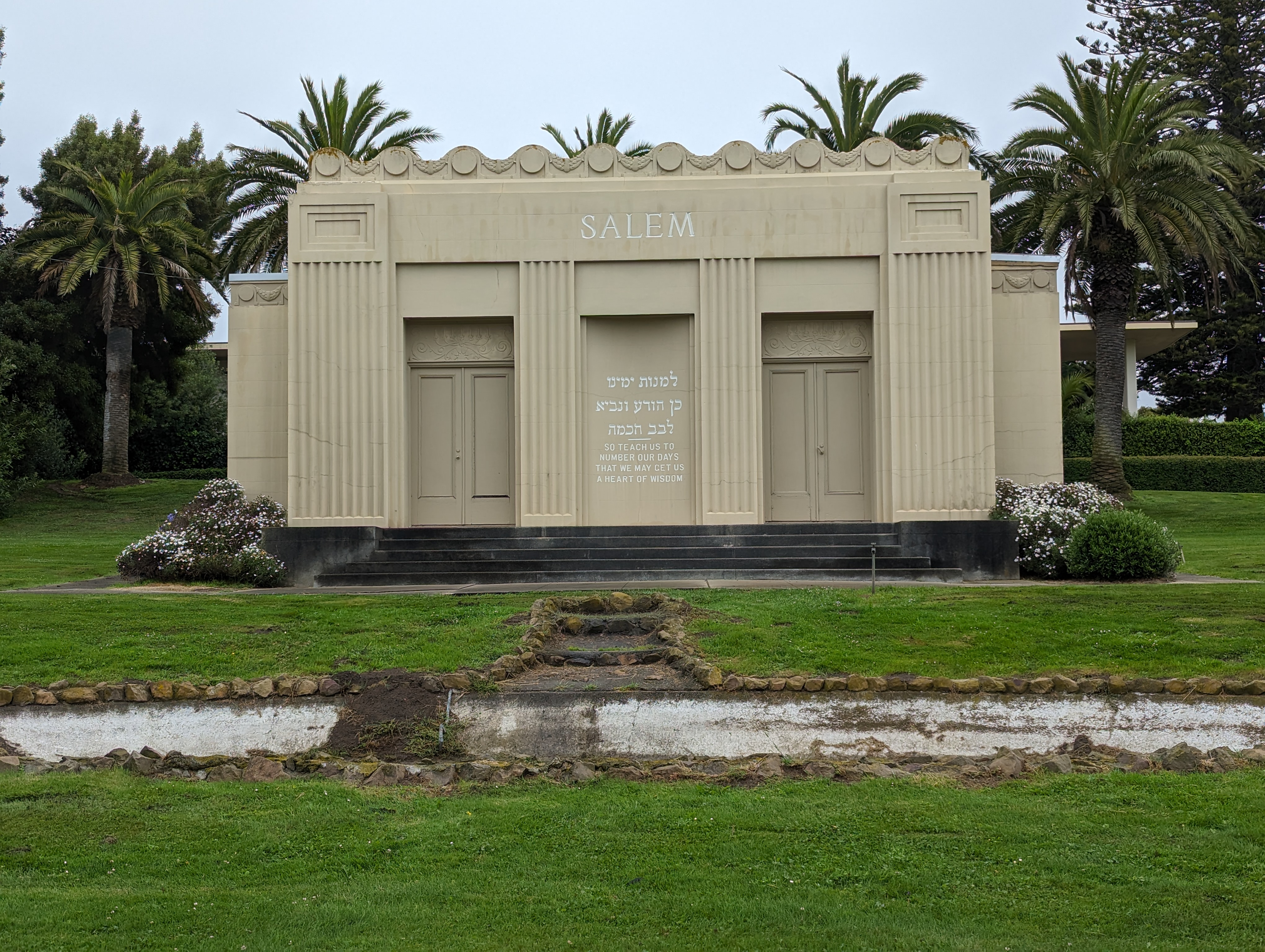
- Restrooms for Salem Memorial Park Garden Mausoleum
- Interactive map of Salem Memorial Park and Garden

Details
- Established: December 20, 1891; 134 years ago
- Location: Colma, California
- Country: United States
- Coordinates: 37°40′38.9510″N 122°27′31.8492″W
- Type: Jewish
- Owned by: Congregation Emanu-El; Congregation Sherith Israel
- Website: jcemsf.org/salem-memorial-park/
- Find a Grave: Salem Memorial Park and Garden

Salem Memorial Park and Garden was founded in 1891, originally as the New Salem Cemetery, and is located at 1171 El Camino Real in Colma, California.

== History ==
Congregation Beth Israel had consecrated a portion of City Cemetery in San Francisco as Sholom or Salem Cemetery on December 2, 1877. City Cemetery was mainly used to bury immigrants and the indigent, with the vast majority of those interred being Chinese immigrants to California; the site is now occupied by the golf course in Lincoln Park and the Legion of Honor museum. Public sentiment against burials in San Francisco began in the early 1890s, culminating in a ban on new burials by 1902.

Wm. Curlett designs for New Salem Cemetery (1891)

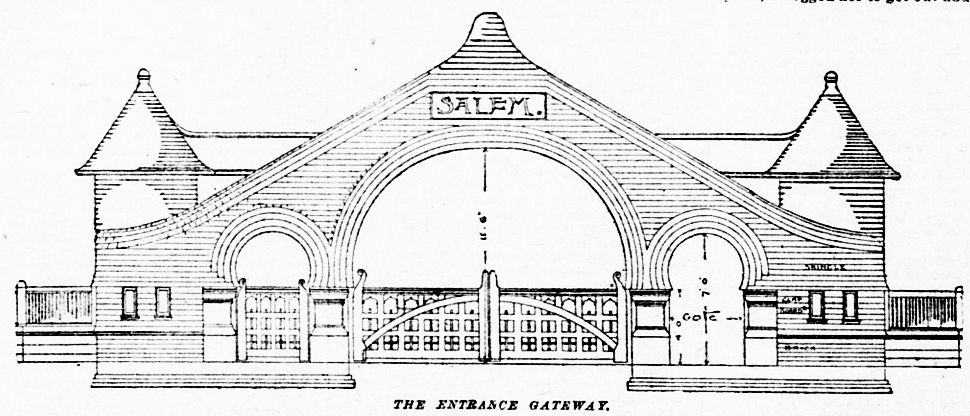
Entrance arch

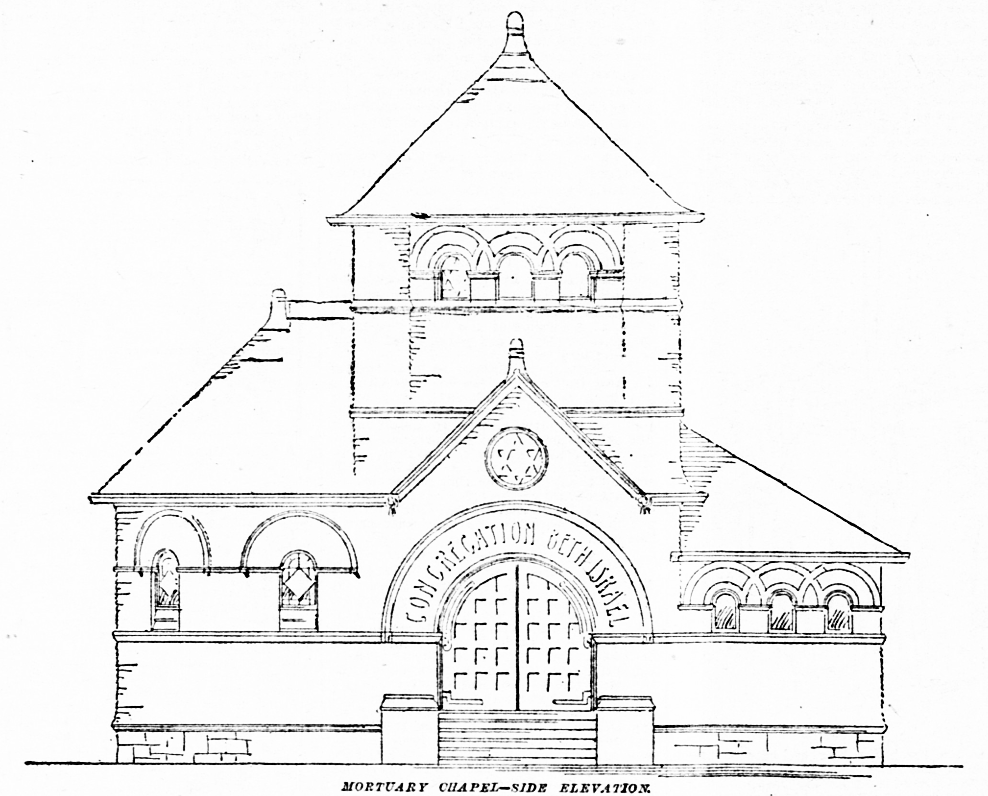
Mortuary Chapel

Congregation Beth Israel proactively purchased 35 1/3 acres (14.3 ha) in Colma for the New Salem Cemetery from the Roman Catholic Archdiocese of San Francisco in October 1891, and a ceremony was held on December 20, 1891, to lay the cornerstone for the new cemetery. An entrance arch and mortuary chapel, designed by William Curlett, were completed and consecrated by May 1892, and a vintage photograph of the chapel exists, although the structures no longer stand at the site; it is not known if they were damaged and demolished following the 1906 San Francisco earthquake. Remains from the original Salem Cemetery were exhumed and moved to Colma between 1901 and 1907.

Since the original establishment, approximately half the site has been sold, leaving it at its present size of 17 acres (6.9 ha). The site's outdoor Garden Mausoleum was completed in 1950, and a Holocaust memorial was completed and dedicated in 1974. Congregation Beth Israel-Judea sold the cemetery to Congregations Emanu-El and Sherith Israel in July 2004, merging it with the neighboring Hills of Eternity and Home of Peace cemeteries.

== Notable burials ==
- Edward S. Salomon (1836–1913), Civil War military officer and governor of Washington Territory
- Robert Wasserman (April 1, 1952 – June 29, 2016), A Grammy Award and NEA grant winner, he played and recorded with a wide variety of musicians including Bob Weir, Bruce Cockburn, Elvis Costello, Ani di Franco, Jerry Garcia, David Grisman, Stéphane Grappelli, Rickie Lee Jones, Van Morrison, Steve Morse, Aaron Neville, Lou Reed, Pete Seeger, Jules Shear, Brian Wilson, Chris Whitley, Neil Young, Jackson Browne, Laurie Anderson, Stephen Perkins, Banyan, Mystic Knights of the Oingo Boingo, and Ratdog.

== See also ==
- List of cemeteries in California
