= Edward S. Salomon =

9th Territorial Governor of Washington

Edward Salomon
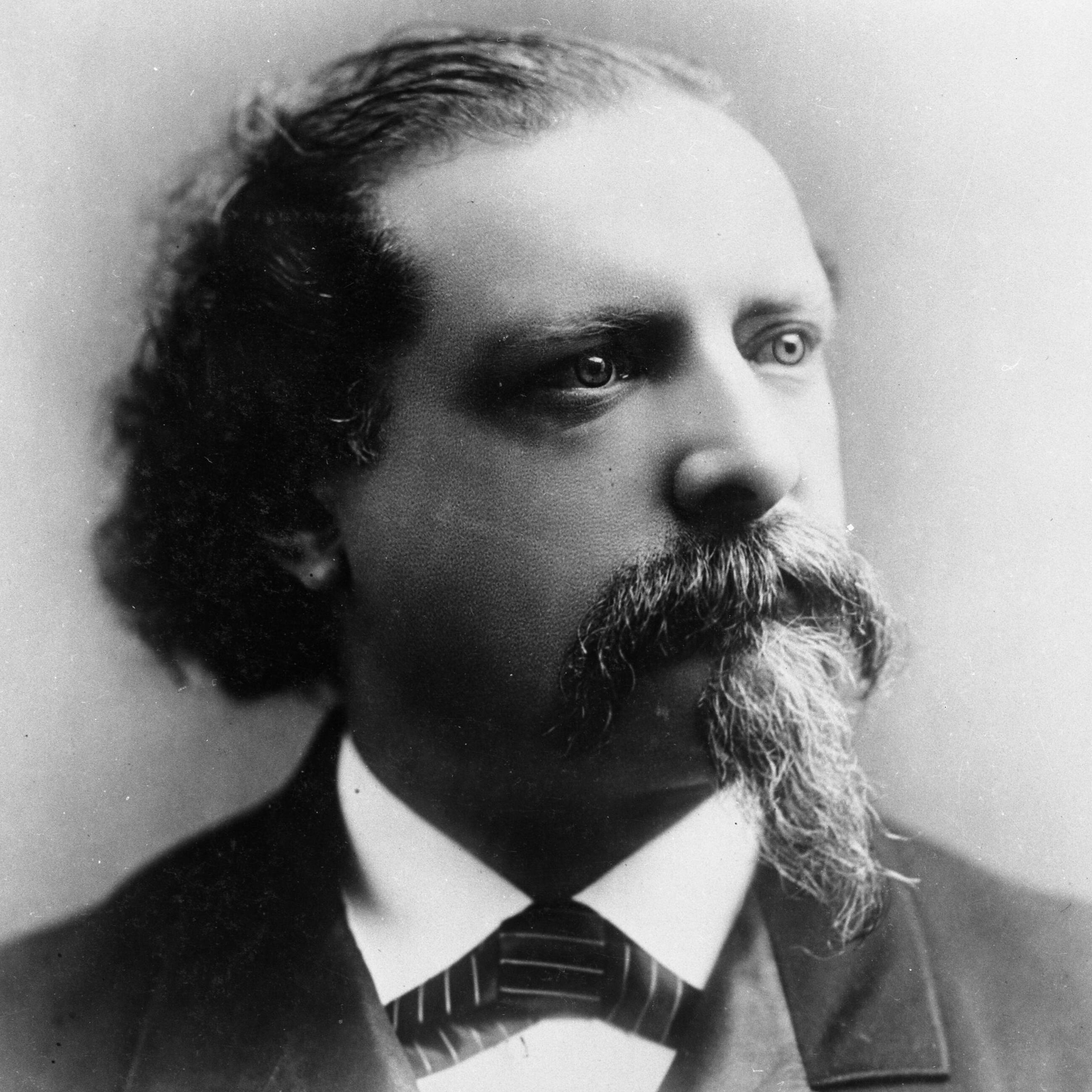
- Salomon c. 1870 – c. 1872

9th Governor of Washington Territory
- In office March 4, 1870 – April 26, 1872
- Appointed by: Ulysses S. Grant
- Preceded by: Alvan Flanders
- Succeeded by: Elisha P. Ferry

7th Cook County Clerk
- In office 1865 – November 1869
- Preceded by: Laurin P. Hilliard
- Succeeded by: John G. Gindele

Member of the California State Assembly
- In office 1890–???

Member of the Chicago City Council from the 6th ward
- In office 1861–1863 Serving with Francis C. Brown
- Preceded by: C.A. Reno
- Succeeded by: David Walsh

Personal details
- Born: Edward Selig Salomon; December 25, 1836 Schleswig
- Died: July 18, 1913 (aged 76) San Francisco, California, U.S.
- Relatives: Charles Eberhard Salomon (cousin); Edward Salomon (cousin); Frederich Salomon (cousin)

Military service
- Allegiance: United States • Union
- Branch/service: Union Army
- Years of service: 1861; 1862–1866
- Rank: Lieutenant Colonel; Brevet Brigadier General
- Unit: 24th Illinois Infantry Regiment; 82nd Illinois Infantry Regiment
- Battles/wars: American Civil War

Edward Selig Salomon (December 25, 1836 – July 18, 1913) was a German-American politician and military official. Born into a Jewish family in the Duchy of Schleswig in modern-day Germany, he immigrated to the United States as a young adult and served as a lieutenant colonel for the Union during the American Civil War. After nomination for appointment to the grade of brevet brigadier general of volunteers to rank from March 13, 1865, by President Andrew Johnson on January 13, 1866, the United States Senate confirmed the appointment on March 12, 1866. Salomon later held public office as Cook County (Illinois) clerk, governor of Washington Territory and a California legislator.

== Early life and career ==
Salomon, who was Jewish, was born in the Duchy of Schleswig, the son of Caroline (Samuels) and Salomon M. Salomon. He emigrated to Illinois in 1856. His cousin Edward Salomon, who also served as a general in the Civil War, later became Governor of Wisconsin.

== Civil War ==
=== Military ===
In July 1861, Salomon was commissioned as a first lieutenant in Colonel Friedrich Hecker's 24th Illinois Infantry Regiment. Disagreements arose between Hecker and some of his officers, after which Hecker and his supporters resigned, including Salomon. Salomon became a civilian again from December 1861 to September 1862. In August 1862, Hecker formed a new regiment, the 82nd Illinois Infantry, or the "Second Hecker Regiment", composed mainly of German, Jewish, Swedish, and other European volunteers. Salomon joined and was promoted to the rank of lieutenant colonel on September 26, 1862.

Salomon became a hero during the Battle of Gettysburg. He had two horses shot out from under him and assumed command of the regiment when Hecker was wounded. Fellow-immigrant major general Carl Schurz, his corps commander, described him during the battle: "He was the only soldier at Gettysburg who did not dodge when Lee's guns thundered; he stood up, smoked his cigar and faced the cannon balls with the sang froid of a Saladin ..."

Early in 1864, Hecker resigned, leaving Salomon in permanent command of the regiment, although still as a lieutenant colonel. Salomon led the regiment during the Atlanta campaign and through the capture of Atlanta. Assigned to deliver messages to Nashville, he missed the famous march to the sea. In December 1864, he rejoined the regiment and finished out the war with them. On March 13, 1865, Salomon received a promotion to brigadier general on for his “distinguished gallantry and meritorious service.”

On January 13, 1866, President Andrew Johnson nominated Salomon for appointment to the grade of brevet brigadier general of volunteers, to rank from March 13, 1865, and the United States Senate confirmed the appointment on March 12, 1866.

=== Chicago City Council ===
In March 1861, Salomon was elected an alderman of the Chicago Common Council, representing the 6th ward. Being only 24 years old, he remains the youngest in Chicago history, He served until 1863.

On March 23, 1863, Salomon made a surprise return visit to Chicago from the in order to attend a council meeting. This maneuver helped give the council's Republican bloc an effective majority in votes at the meeting.

== Postbellum activities ==
After the war, Salomon returned to Chicago where he was elected Cook County Clerk as a Republican in the fall of 1865, serving until November 1869.

On March 4, 1870, President Ulysses S. Grant appointed Salomon governor of Washington Territory. He was caught up in the political scandals of the Grant administration and resigned in 1872. The Pacific Tribune newspaper, commenting on his resignation, lauded his honesty and integrity. General Philip Sheridan led a delegation that presented him with a silver table service in recognition of his fine record of service, high qualities as a citizen, and as a friend.

Salomon moved to San Francisco, where he practiced law. In 1898 Salomon was appointed assistant district attorney for the city and county. He was elected to the California State Assembly in 1890.

Salomon died in San Francisco on July 18, 1913, and is buried in Salem Memorial Park, Colma, California.

== See also ==
- List of American Civil War brevet generals
- German Americans in the Civil War

== Notes ==
Political offices
Preceded by Alvan Flanders	Governor of Washington Territory; 1870–1872	Succeeded by Elisha P. Ferry
