= Judge Columbia Lancaster House =

- U.S. National Register of Historic Places
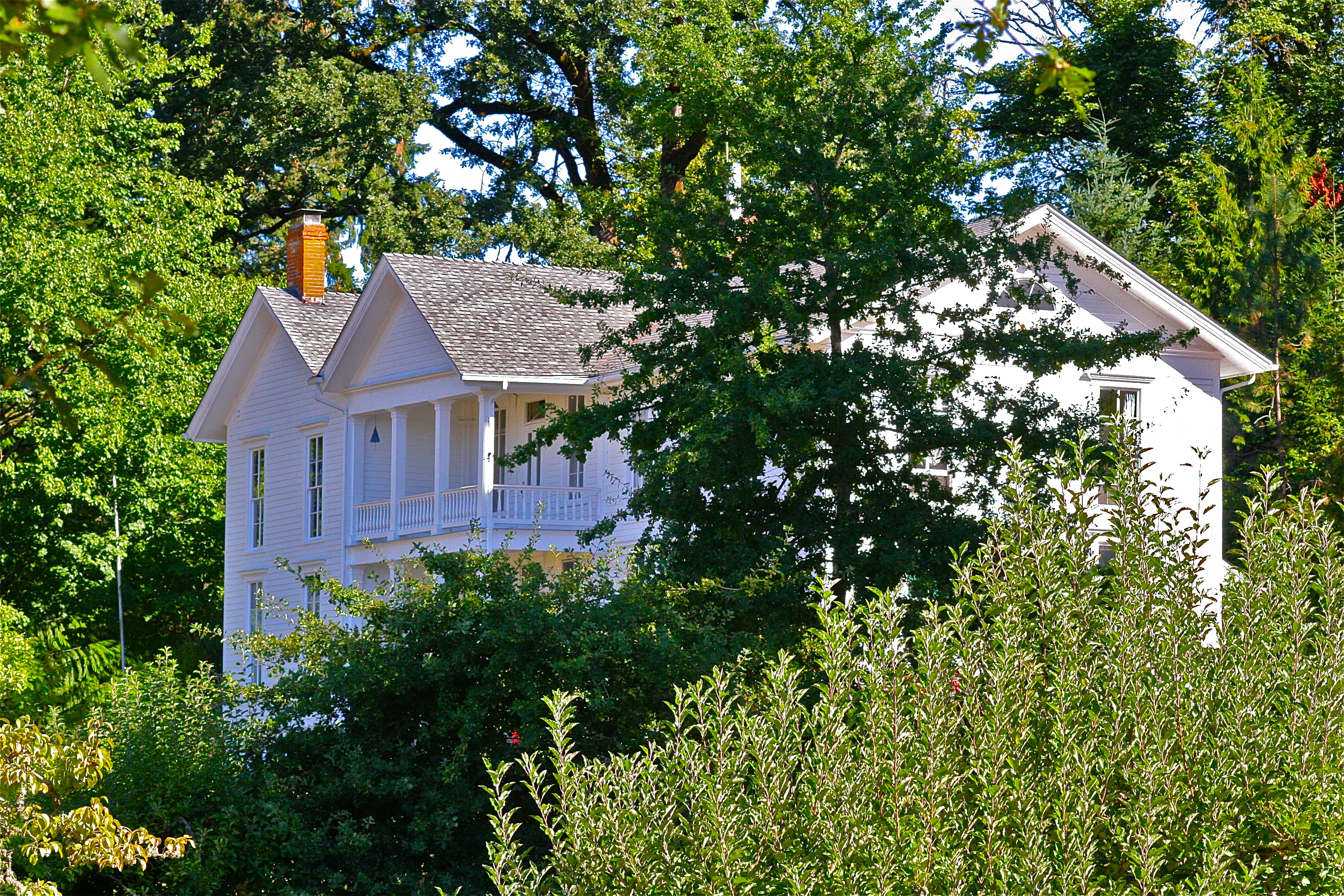

- Location within Washington (state)
- Location: Ridgefield, Washington
- Coordinates: 45°51′48″N 122°44′52″W
- Built: 1850-55
- Architectural style: Greek Revival
- NRHP reference No.: 75001843
- Added to NRHP: February 20, 1975

The Judge Columbia Lancaster House is a large house on the National Register of Historic Places in Ridgefield, Washington in the Southern Colonial style. Constructed from 1850 to 1855, it is named for Columbia Lancaster and is one of the oldest frame houses in Washington State.
