= 69th Ohio Infantry Regiment =

- Active: November 1861 to July 17, 1865
- Country: United States
- Allegiance: Union
- Branch: Infantry
- Engagements: Battle of Stones River; Tullahoma Campaign; Battle of Chickamauga; Siege of Chattanooga; Battle of Missionary Ridge; Atlanta campaign; Battle of Resaca; Battle of Kennesaw Mountain; Siege of Atlanta; Battle of Jonesboro; Sherman's March to the Sea; Carolinas campaign; Battle of Bentonville

The 69th Ohio Infantry Regiment was an infantry regiment in the Union Army during the American Civil War.

== Service ==
The 69th Ohio Infantry Regiment was organized at Hamilton and Camp Chase in Columbus, Ohio beginning in November 1861. It mustered in for three years service April 1862 under the command of Colonel Lewis T. Campbell.

The regiment was attached to District of Nashville and Franklin, Unattached, Army of the Ohio, to September 1862. 29th Brigade, 8th Division, Army of the Ohio, to November 1862. 2nd Brigade, 2nd Division, Center, XIV Corps, Army of the Cumberland, to January 1863. 2nd Brigade, 2nd Division, XIV Corps, to October 1863. 2nd Brigade, 1st Division, XIV Corps, to September 1864. 3rd Brigade, 1st Division, XIV Corps, to November 1864. 2nd Brigade, 1st Division, XIV Corps, to July 1865.

The 69th Ohio Infantry mustered out of service at Louisville, Kentucky on July 17, 1865.

== Detailed service ==
Moved to Camp Chase, Ohio, February 19, 1862, and duty there until April 1862. Moved to Nashville, Tenn., April 19–22, thence to Franklin, Tenn., May 1, and duty there until June 8. Moved to Nashville, Tenn., June 8, 1862, thence to Murfreesboro, Tenn. Expedition to McMinnville and Pikesville June 12–20. Provost duty at Nashville until December. Expedition to Gallatin and action with Morgan August 13. Siege of Nashville September 12-November 7. Near Nashville November 5. Nashville and Franklin Pike December 14. Advance on Murfreesboro December 26–30. Battle of Stones River December 30–31, 1862 and January 1–3, 1863. Duty at Murfreesboro until June. Tullahoma Campaign June 23-July 7. Occupation of middle Tennessee until August 16. Passage of the Cumberland Mountains and Tennessee River, and Chickamauga Campaign August 16-September 22. Battle of Chickamauga September 19–21 (supply train guard during the battle). Rossville Gap September 21. Siege of Chattanooga, Tenn., September 24-November 23. Orchard Knob November 23–24. Missionary Ridge November 25. Graysville November 26. Duty at Rossville, Ga., until March 1864. Veterans absent on furlough March 16-May 11, rejoin at Buzzard's Roost, Ga. Atlanta Campaign May to September. Demonstration on Rocky Faced Ridge May 8–11. Battle of Resaca May 14–15. Advance on Dallas May 18–25. Operations on line of Pumpkin Vine Creek and battles about Dallas, New Hope Church and Allatoona Hills May 25-June 5. Pickett's Mills May 27. Operations about Marietta and against Kennesaw Mountain June 10-July 2. Pine Hill June 11–14. Lost Mountain June 15–17. Assault on Kennesaw June 27. Ruff's Station. Smyrna Camp Ground, July 4. Chattahoochie River July 5–17. Peachtree Creek June 19–20. Siege of Atlanta July 22-August 25. Utoy Creek August 5–7. Flank movement on Jonesboro August 25–30. Battle of Jonesboro August 31-September 1. Lovejoy's Station September 2–6. Operations against Hood in northern Georgia and northern Alabama September 29-November 3. March to the sea November 15-December 10. Siege of Savannah December 10–21. Campaign of the Carolinas January to April, 1865. Near Cheraw, S.C., February 28. Taylor's Hole Creek, Averysboro, N. C., March 16. Battle of Bentonville March 19–21. Occupation of Goldsboro March 24. Advance on Raleigh April 10–14. Occupation of Raleigh April 14. Bennett's House April 26. Surrender of Johnston and his army. March to Washington, D.C., via Richmond, Va., April 29-May 19. Grand Review of the Armies May 24. Moved to Louisville, Ky., June, and duty there until July

== Casualties ==
The regiment lost a total of 187 men during service; 5 officers and 84 enlisted men killed or mortally wounded, 98 enlisted men died of disease.

== Commanders ==
- Colonel Lewis T. Campbell
- Colonel William B. Cassilly
- Colonel Marshall F. Moore
- Colonel Joseph H. Brigham - commanded at the battle of Chickamauga as lieutenant colonel

== See also ==
- List of Ohio Civil War units
- Ohio in the Civil War
