= Obadiah B. McFadden =

American politician and jurist (1815–1875)

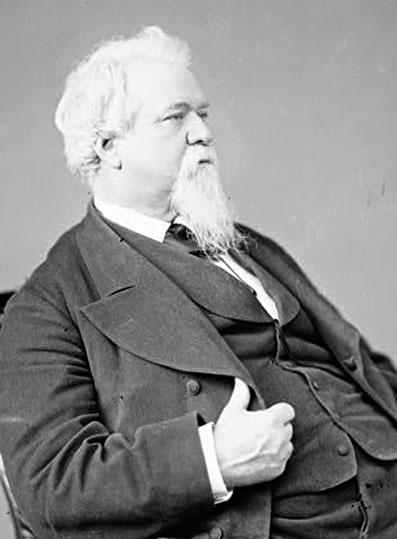
- McFadden while serving in Congress

8th Justice of the Oregon Supreme Court
- In office 1853–1854
- Nominated by: President Franklin Pierce
- Preceded by: Matthew Deady
- Succeeded by: Matthew Deady

Delegate to the U.S. House of Representatives from Washington Territory's at-large district
- In office March 4, 1873 – March 3, 1875
- Preceded by: Selucius Garfielde
- Succeeded by: Orange Jacobs

Personal details
- Born: November 18, 1815 West Middletown, Pennsylvania
- Died: June 25, 1875 (aged 59) Olympia, Washington
- Party: Democratic
- Spouse: Margaret Caldwell

Obadiah Benton McFadden (November 18, 1815 – June 25, 1875) was an American attorney and politician in the Pacific Northwest. He was the 8th justice of the Oregon Supreme Court, temporarily serving on the court to replace Matthew Deady. A Pennsylvania native, he later was a legislator in the Washington Territory, and he served in Congress representing that territory.

== Early life ==
Obadiah McFadden was born in West Middletown, Pennsylvania, on November 18, 1815. He was then educated locally in Washington County, Pennsylvania, at the public schools and at McKeever Academy. Then in 1837 he married Margaret Caldwell. By 1843 he had been admitted to the bar allowing him to practice law.

== Political and professional career ==
In 1853, Franklin Pierce sent McFadden to Oregon with a commission making Matthew P. Deady a justice of the Territorial Supreme Court. However, it was subsequently discovered that the commission named "Mordecai P. Deady"; as there was no such person, Deady withdrew from the court on the grounds that the commission was invalid, with McFadden taking his place for the remainder of the term.

McFadden's term ended in 1854 and he left the Oregon court. At the time he was one of three justices on the bench of the court. In 1854, he was appointed to the Washington Supreme Court when Washington Territory was created out of Oregon Territory and wrote the opinion denying the appeal of a murder charge against Chief Leschi of the Nisqually Tribe. He served as the court's Chief Justice from 1858 to 1861. In 1861, he would become the president of the Washington Legislature's Council Chamber and would serve on that body until 1864 representing Thurston, Lewis and Chehalis counties. From 1855 to 1856, he fought in the Yakima War against the Yakima Indians.

McFadden, Margaret, and their children settled in Chehalis, Washington in 1859, purchasing a 320-acre (130 ha) parcel from the Saunders family who were founders of the city, known as Saundersville at the time. An eight-room, log cabin style home was built. Both Obadiah and Margaret were postmasters in the 1860s and 1870s, using their home as a post office. As of 2024, the O. B. McFadden House is listed on the National Register of Historic Places (NRHP) and is recognized as the oldest structure in the county, as well as the oldest residence in Chehalis. In his time in Chehalis, he raised funds to build a plank road to connect the community to Olympia and is credited with changing the name of the town from Saundersville to Chehalis.

== Later years ==
McFadden then returned to private law practice, setting up office in Olympia, Washington. Then in 1872 he was elected as a Democrat to represent the territory in the 43rd United States Congress. He served as a delegate from March 4, 1873, to March 3, 1875, and was not a candidate for renomination to the position. McFadden died in Olympia on June 25, 1875, and after a large funeral attended by approximately 1,200 people and a regal procession that included a band and carriages, was buried at the Masonic Cemetery. His wife, Margaret, died in March 1903.

U.S. House of Representatives
Preceded by Selucius Garfielde	Delegate to the U.S. House of Representatives from Washington Territory's at-large congressional district March 4, 1873 – March 3, 1875	Succeeded by Orange Jacobs
