= Thomas Hurley Brents =

American lawyer and politician from Washington

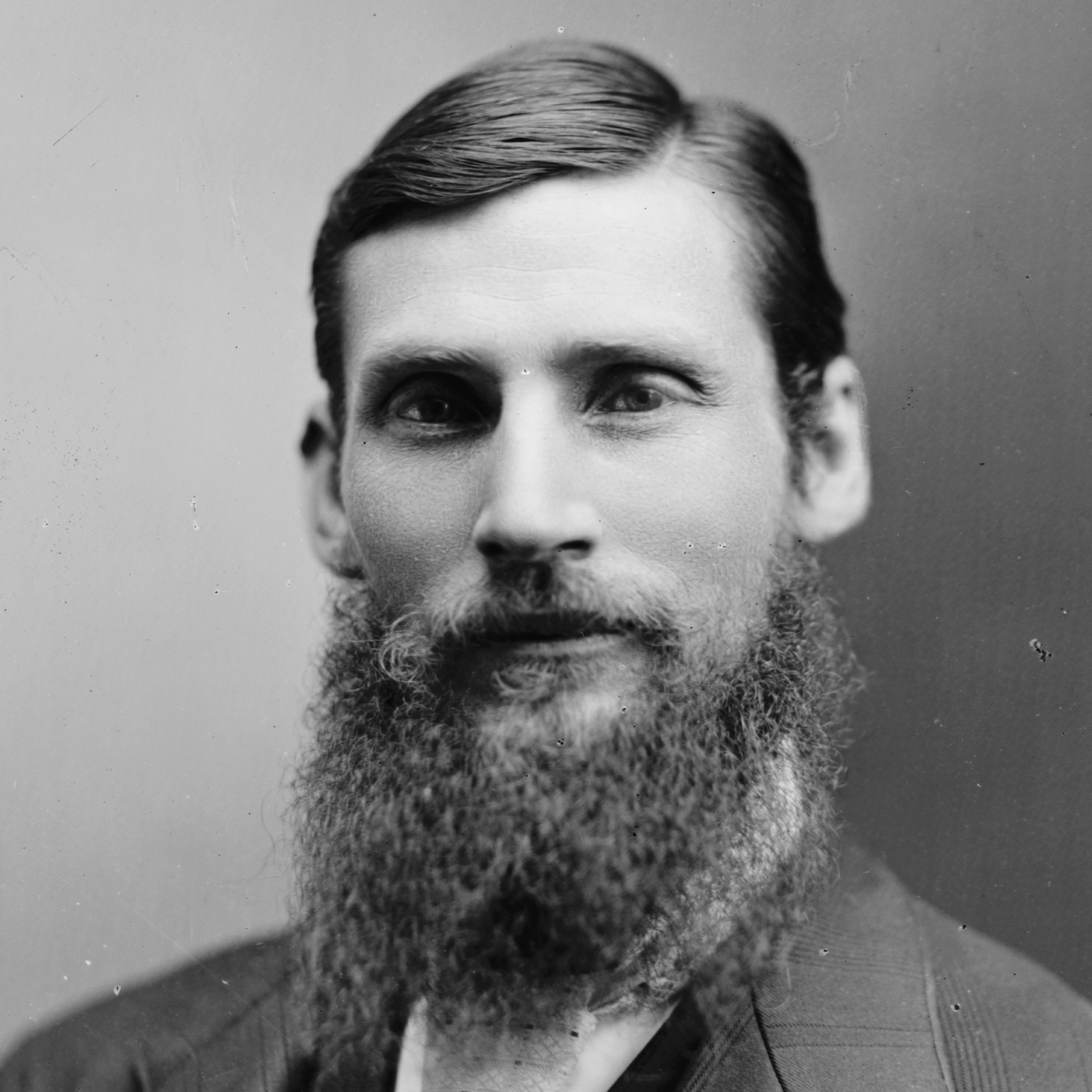
- Brents c. 1865 – c. 1880

Delegate to the U.S. House of Representatives from Washington Territory's at-large district
- In office March 4, 1879 – March 3, 1885
- Preceded by: Orange Jacobs
- Succeeded by: Charles Stewart Voorhees
- Constituency: Washington Territory

Personal details
- Born: December 24, 1840 Florence, Illinois
- Died: October 23, 1916 (aged 75) Walla Walla, Washington
- Party: Republican
- Occupation: Lawyer

Thomas Hurley Brents (December 24, 1840 – October 23, 1916) was an American politician and attorney in the Pacific Northwest. A native of Illinois, he was raised in Oregon where he served in the Oregon House of Representatives. A Republican, he later lived in California and then Washington Territory where he was the Congressional Delegate for the territory from 1879 to 1885.

== Early life ==
Thomas Brents was born near Florence, Illinois, in Pike County on December 24, 1840. Brents attended the common schools and in Oregon he attended Portland Academy, the Baptist Seminary in Oregon City, and then McMinnville College (now Linfield College. He served as a Justice of the Peace in 1862 and then moved to Canyon City, Oregon, where he was engaged in the general mercantile business from 1863 to 1864. There he served as postmaster at the same time, and then from 1864 to 1866 he served as clerk of Grant County.

== Political career ==
In 1866, he served as delegate to the Union-Republican convention of Oregon, and was elected that year to the Oregon House of Representatives from Grant County. Brents then studied law and was admitted to the bar in 1866 and commenced practice in San Francisco, California, in 1867.

Brents moved to Walla Walla, Washington, in 1870 and served as city attorney of Walla Walla in 1871 and 1872. He then presided over the Republican Territorial convention at Vancouver in 1874. Brents was elected as a Republican to the Forty-sixth, Forty-seventh, and Forty-eighth Congresses (March 4, 1879 – March 3, 1885). Brents was an enthusiastic advocate of bigotry toward Chinese immigrants, claiming that "Most them are criminals and prostitutes. . . . almost without an exception they will steal, commit perjury and other crimes of the most heinous nature."

== Later life ==
He was an unsuccessful candidate for renomination in 1884 and then resumed the practice of law, later serving as judge of the superior court of Walla Walla from 1896 to 1913. Thomas Brents died in Walla Walla, Washington, on October 23, 1916, at the age of 75 and was interred in Blue Mountain Cemetery.

Political offices
Preceded by Orange Jacobs	Delegate to the United States House of Representatives from Washington Territory; March 4, 1879 – March 3, 1885	Succeeded by Charles Stewart Voorhees
