= Columbia Lancaster =

American judge

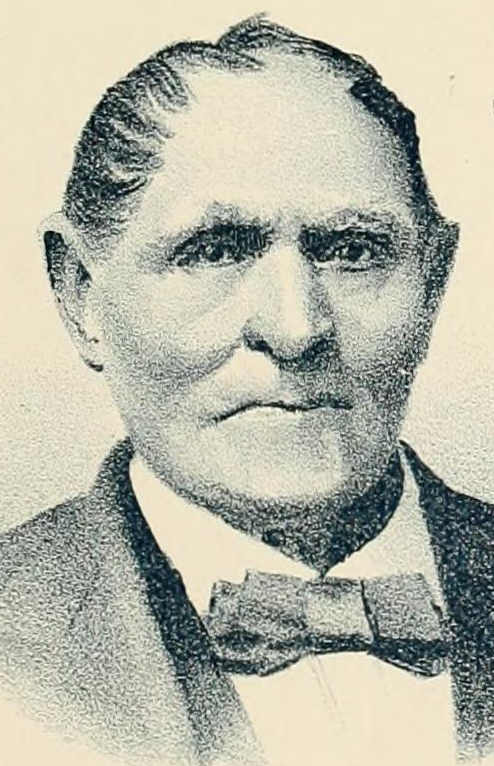
- From volume 1 (1889) of History of the Pacific Northwest: Oregon and Washington.

7th Supreme Judge of the Provisional Government of Oregon
- In office November 30, 1847 – April 9, 1849
- Appointed by: George Abernethy
- Preceded by: J. Quinn Thornton
- Succeeded by: Government dissolved

Delegate to the U.S. House of Representatives from Washington Territory's at-large district
- In office April 12, 1854 – March 3, 1855
- Preceded by: position created
- Succeeded by: James Patton Anderson

Personal details
- Born: August 26, 1803 New Milford, Connecticut
- Died: September 15, 1893 (aged 90) Vancouver, Washington

Columbia Lancaster (August 26, 1803 – September 15, 1893) was an American lawyer and politician who served as the first Delegate from the Territory of Washington to the United States House of Representatives.

== Biography ==
=== Early life ===
Columbia Lancaster was born in New Milford, Connecticut, on August 26, 1803. Lancaster moved with his family to Canfield, Ohio, in 1817. There he attended the common schools before he moved to Detroit, Michigan Territory, in 1824. In Canfield, he met and married Roseanne Jones. In Michigan he studied law and was admitted to the bar in 1830 and commenced practice in Centreville, Michigan.

=== Politics ===
He was appointed prosecuting attorney of Michigan Territory by Governor Lewis Cass. He served in the Michigan House of Representatives in 1838. He settled in the Willamette Valley, in Oregon Country, in 1847. He served as Supreme Judge of the Provisional Government of Oregon from 1847 to the end of that government in 1849. He took up his residence near the mouth of the Lewis River, Oregon Territory (present-day State of Washington). He was an unsuccessful candidate for Delegate to the Thirty-first Congress from Oregon before the separation of the Territories of Washington and Oregon.

Lancaster served as member of the Oregon Territorial Council (Senate) from 1850 to 1852. During the tumultuous 1851-52 session of the Oregon Territorial Legislature Lancaster gave his allegiance to a rump group consisting of four members of the House who refused to participate with the Democratic Party majority in session at Salem. Lancaster was the sole member of the Council who attempted to establish this minority faction as the legitimate Oregon Territorial Legislature in a session held at the Territorial Library in Oregon City. The rival minority assembly continued to meet in Oregon City for two weeks, marked by the spectacle of Lancaster making and seconding his own motions in the "Council" himself.

Lancaster resigned his Council seat in the fall of 1852 and was replaced at a special election held December 7 of that year.

When the Washington Territory was admitted to representation, he was elected as a Democrat to the Thirty-third Congress and served from April 12, 1854 to March 3, 1855. He was an unsuccessful candidate for renomination.

== Later life ==
Lancaster was regent of the University of Washington in Seattle in 1862. He was also connected with the Puget Sound & Columbia River Railroad project in 1862.

== Death and legacy ==
Lancaster died in Vancouver, Washington, on September 15, 1893, and his body was interred in the City Cemetery.

Lancaster Lake, just north of Ridgefield, Washington, is named in his honor. His house in Ridgefield survives and is listed on the NRHP.

U.S. House of Representatives
Preceded by office created	Delegate to the U.S. House of Representatives from Washington; 1854-1855	Succeeded by James P. Anderson
