= Alvan Flanders =

8th Territorial Governor of Washington

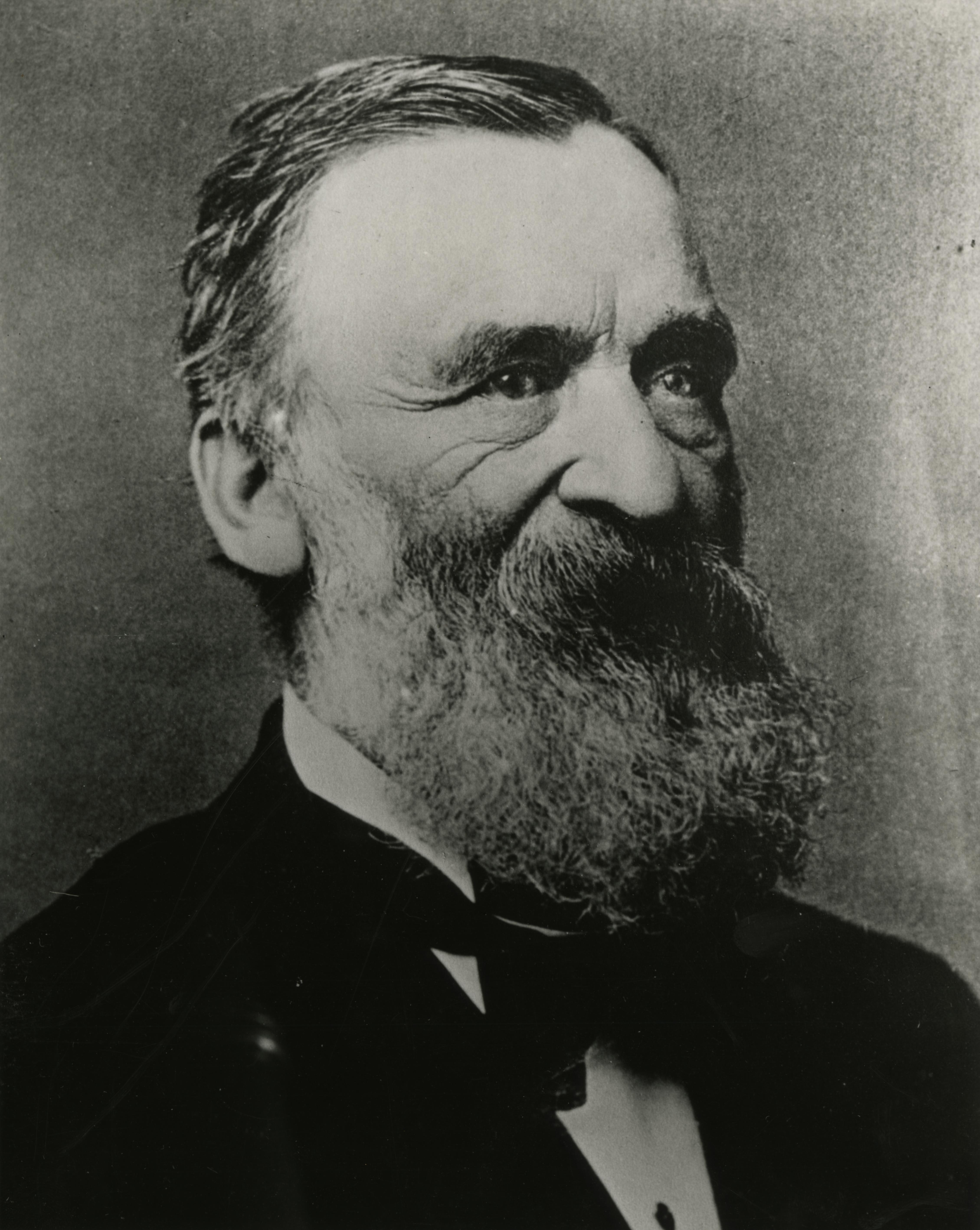

8th Governor of Washington Territory
- In office April 5, 1869 – March 4, 1870
- Preceded by: Marshall F. Moore
- Succeeded by: Edward S. Salomon

Delegate to the U.S. House of Representatives from Washington Territory's at-large district
- In office March 4, 1867 – March 3, 1869
- Preceded by: Arthur Armstrong Denny
- Succeeded by: Selucius Garfielde

Personal details
- Born: August 2, 1825 Hopkinton, New Hampshire
- Died: March 14, 1894 (aged 68) San Francisco, California
- Party: Republican
- Spouse: Elizabeth M. Smith
- Children: 1

Alvan Flanders (August 2, 1825 – March 14, 1894) was an American businessman and politician who served as the 8th governor of Washington Territory from 1869 to 1870. A member of the Republican, he previously served as the U.S. representative for Washington Territory's at-large congressional district from 1867 to 1869.

== Biography ==
Born in Hopkinton, New Hampshire, Flanders attended the public schools in New Hampshire, and learned the machinist trade in Boston. He married Nancy Acorn on June 14, 1848. Later he married Elizabeth M. Smith on December 7, 1855. He had one son, Eddie.

== Career ==
Flanders moved to Humboldt County, California, in 1851, and there engaged in the lumber business until 1858. He moved to San Francisco. He was one of the founders and proprietors of the "San Francisco Daily Times". He served as member of the California State Assembly in 1861. He was an officer of the United States branch mint in 1861.

Flanders moved to the Territory of Washington in 1863 and engaged in mercantile pursuits in Wallula. He became the first postmaster of Wallula 1865–1867.

Flanders was elected as a Republican to the Fortieth Congress (March 4, 1867 – March 3, 1869). He was not a candidate for renomination in 1868. He was appointed by President Grant as Governor of the Territory of Washington on April 5, 1869, and served until 1870. He returned to San Francisco, at the expiration of his term.

== Death ==
Flanders died in San Francisco on March 14, 1894. He was interred at Laurel Hill Cemetery which no longer exists, and his re-interment location is unknown. He was related to the political Flanders family of Vermont. He was cousin to; Francis Durrell Flanders, Benjamin Franklin Flanders, and Ralph Edward Flanders.

U.S. House of Representatives
Preceded by Arthur A. Denny	Delegate to the U.S. House of Representatives from Washington Territory; 1867-1869	Succeeded by Selucius Garfielde
Political offices
Preceded by Marshall F. Moore	Territorial Governor of Washington; 1869–1870	Succeeded by Edward S. Salomon
