= Marshall F. Moore =

7th Territorial Governor of Washington

Marshall Frank Moore
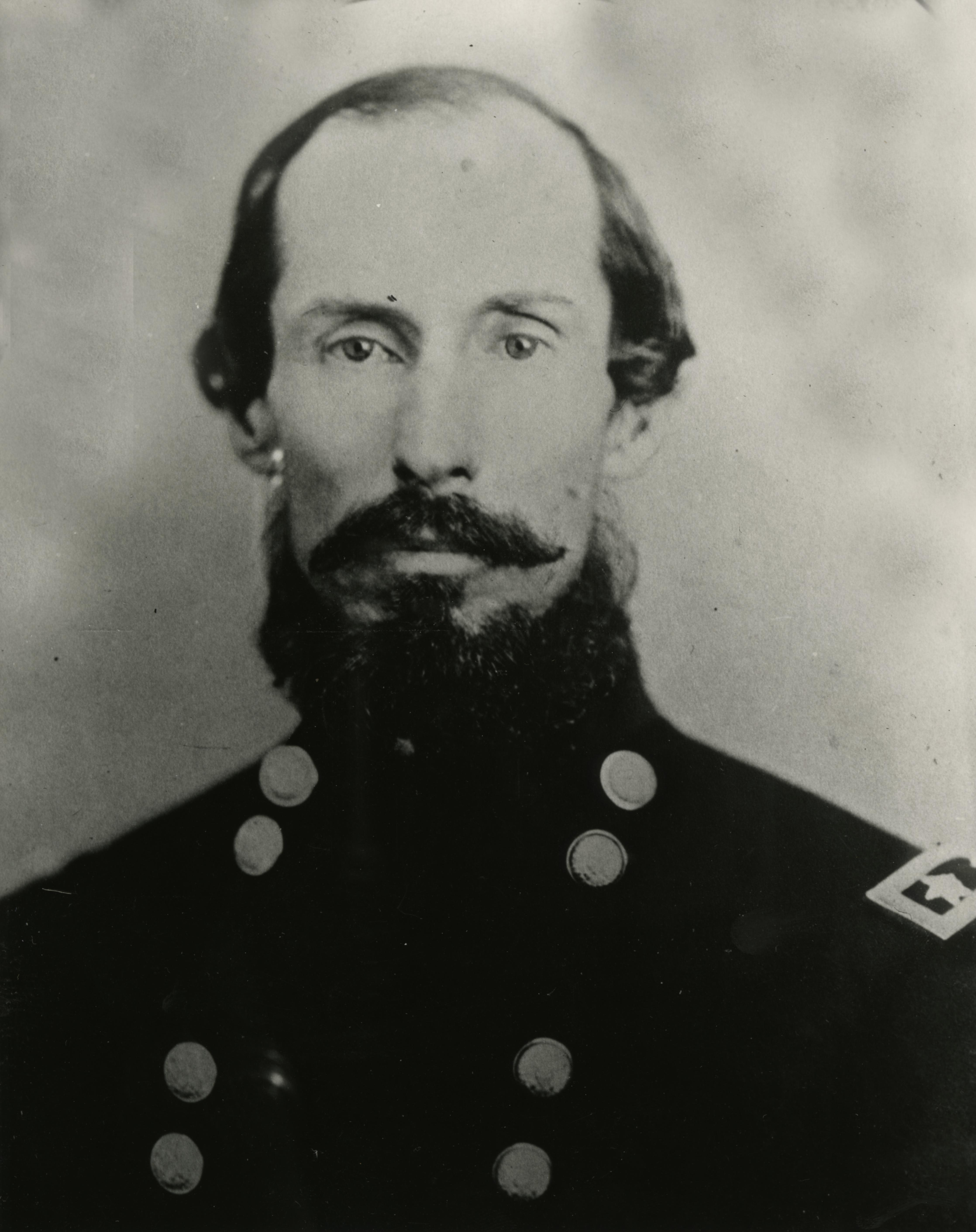

7th Governor of Washington Territory
- In office 26 August 1867 – 5 April 1869
- Preceded by: George Edward Cole
- Succeeded by: Alvan Flanders

Personal details
- Born: February 12, 1829 Binghamton, New York
- Died: February 26, 1870 (aged 41) Olympia, Washington
- Party: Republican
- Spouse: Van Trump
- Children: 3

Military service
- Allegiance: United States; Union
- Branch/service: United States Army; Union Army
- Years of service: 1861–1864
- Rank: Colonel; Bvt. Major General
- Commands: 69th Ohio Infantry Regiment
- Battles/wars: American Civil War: Battle of Rich Mountain; Battle of Shiloh; Battle of Chickamauga; Battle of Jonesboro; Battle of Missionary Ridge

Marshall Frank Moore (12 February 1829 – 26 February 1870) was an American Civil War veteran, attorney, and the seventh governor of Washington Territory.

== Biography ==
Moore was born in Binghamton, New York, Broome County, on 12 February 1829. He attended Yale University. He married Francis Fanny Van Trump on 7 June 1859. The couple had three children; Mary Louise, Frances, and Thomas.

== Career ==
Moore served as a state judge in the Common Pleas Court and as a prosecuting attorney in Sioux City, Iowa.

Moore joined the Union Army during the civil war and served under George McClellan in Virginia and under Sherman. The colonel commanded the 69th Ohio Infantry Regiment and led various brigades for much of the war. He was at Rich Mountain, Shiloh, Chickamauga, Jonesboro and Missionary Ridge. He resigned in 1864 and was brevetted major general on 13 March 1865.

Moore was Governor of Washington Territory from 1867 to 1869. He was accompanied to Olympia, Washington, by his brother-in-law, Philemon Beecher Van Trump, who served as Moore's private secretary. Moore was a delegate to the United States Congress from Washington Territory in 1868. He also was an attorney in New Orleans.

== Death ==
Moore died in Olympia, Thurston County, Washington, on 26 February 1870. He is interred at Masonic Memorial Park, Tumwater, Thurston County, Washington.

Political offices
Preceded by George Edward Cole	Territorial Governor of Washington; 1867–1869	Succeeded by Alvan Flanders
