= Orange Jacobs =

American judge

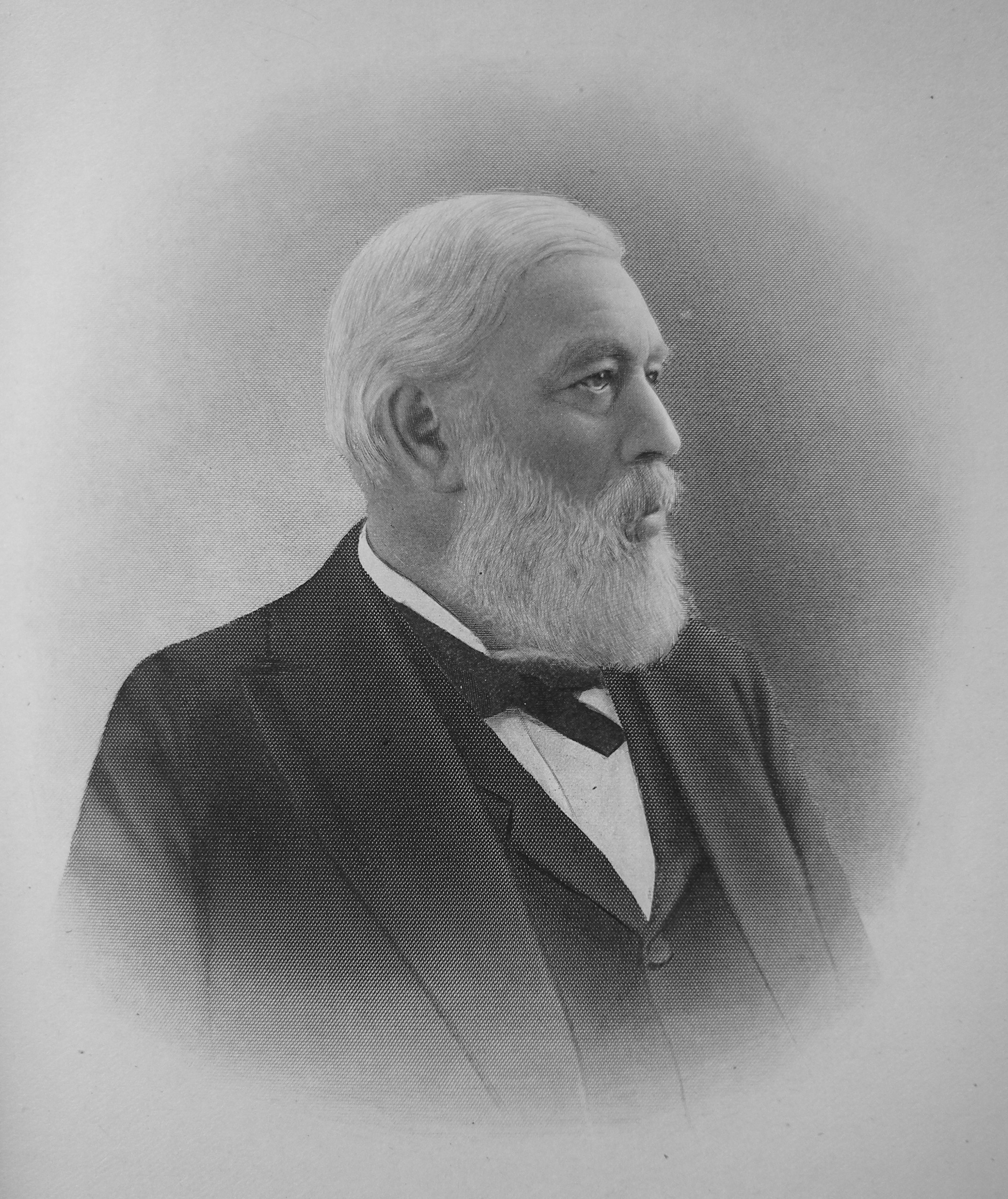

10th Mayor of Seattle
- In office August 3, 1879 – August 2, 1880
- Preceded by: Beriah Brown
- Succeeded by: Leonard P. Smith

Delegate to the U.S. House of Representatives from Washington Territory's at-large district
- In office March 4, 1875 – March 3, 1879
- Preceded by: Obadiah Benton McFadden
- Succeeded by: Thomas Hurley Brents

Personal details
- Born: May 2, 1827 Geneseo, New York
- Died: May 21, 1914 (aged 87) Seattle, Washington
- Party: Republican

Orange Jacobs (May 2, 1827 – May 21, 1914) was an American lawyer, newspaper publisher, and politician. His career in government centered on the Territory of Washington, for which he served as a delegate to the U.S. Congress, chief justice of the territory's supreme court, mayor of Seattle, and other roles.

Born near Geneseo, New York, Jacobs moved with his parents to Michigan Territory in 1831. He attended the common schools, Albion College (in Michigan) and the University of Michigan at Ann Arbor. After studying law, he was admitted to the Michigan bar in 1851 and commenced practice in Sturgis, Michigan. He moved to the Territory of Oregon in 1852 and settled in Jacksonville, Jackson County, where he continued the practice of law. There he edited and published the Jacksonville Sentinel until 1859, moving to the Territory of Washington sometime after 1860. Jacobs served as an associate justice of the supreme court of the Territory of Washington in 1869, and as chief justice of the supreme court from 1871 to 1875.

Jacobs was elected as a Republican to the Forty-fourth and Forty-fifth Congresses (March 4, 1875 – March 3, 1879). He was not a candidate for renomination in 1878, resuming the practice of law in Seattle and serving as mayor of Seattle in 1880. The University of Washington awarded Jacobs with its first ever honorary degree, a doctor of laws. He served as a member of the Territorial council 1885–1887. He served as a member of the Seattle charter revision commission in 1889 and the corporation counsel for the city of Seattle in 1890. He served as judge of the superior court of King County 1896–1900. Jacobs died in Seattle, May 21, 1914, and was interred in the city's Mount Pleasant Cemetery.

== Sources ==
- United States Congress. "Orange Jacobs (id: J000037)". Biographical Directory of the United States Congress.

U.S. House of Representatives
Preceded by Obadiah Benton McFadden	Delegate to the U.S. House of Representatives from Washington Territory's at-large congressional district March 4, 1875 – March 3, 1879	Succeeded by Thomas Hurley Brents
Political offices
Preceded by Beriah Brown	Mayor of Seattle; 1879–1880	Succeeded by Leonard P. Smith
