= John Denny (politician) =

American politician

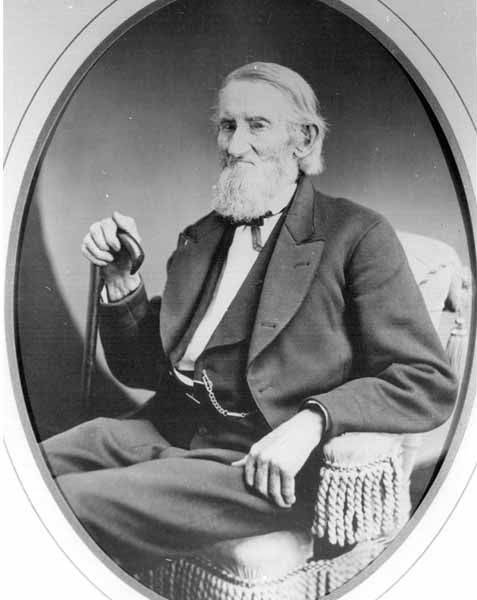

Member of the Illinois House of Representatives
- In office 1840–1843

Member of the Illinois State Senate
- In office 1846–1852

Personal details
- Born: John Denny; April 4, 1793 Mercer County, Kentucky
- Died: July 28, 1875 (aged 82) Seattle, Washington, U.S.
- Children: 2, including Arthur

John Denny (May 4, 1793 – July 28, 1875) was an American pioneer and politician.

Born in Mercer County, Kentucky, Denny served in the Kentucky Volunteers regiment during the War of 1812. In 1816, Denny, his wife, and family moved to Washington County, Indiana and then to Putnam County, Indiana. Then, in 1835, Denny, his wife, and family settled in Knox County, Illinois. While living in Knox County, Illinois Denny served as justice of the peace. From 1840 to 1842, Denny served in the Illinois House of Representatives and from 1846 to 1852, in the Illinois State Senate. He was a Whig and then a Republican. He settled in Seattle, Washington where he died. His son was Arthur A. Denny.

John Street in Seattle was named after Denny by his sons.
