= John B. Allen =

American politician (1845–1903)

John Beard Allen
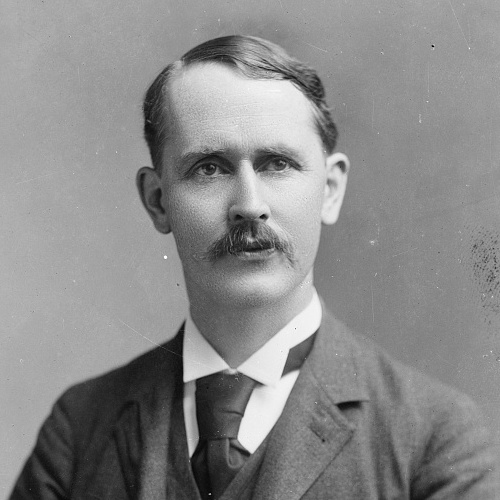
- Allen c. 1873-1890

United States Senator from Washington
- In office November 20, 1889 – March 3, 1893
- Preceded by: Position created
- Succeeded by: John L. Wilson

Delegate to the U.S. House of Representatives from Washington Territory's at-large district
- In office March 4, 1889 – November 11, 1889
- Preceded by: Charles Stewart Voorhees
- Succeeded by: District eliminated

Personal details
- Born: May 18, 1845 Crawfordsville, Indiana
- Died: January 28, 1903 (aged 57) Seattle, Washington
- Party: Republican
- Education: University of Michigan

Military service
- Allegiance: United States of America; Union
- Branch/service: Union Army
- Years of service: 1864
- Rank: Private
- Unit: 135th Indiana Infantry Regiment
- Battles/wars: American Civil War

John Beard Allen (May 18, 1845 – January 28, 1903) was an American lawyer and politician who served as a United States senator from Washington from 1889 to 1893. A member of the Republican Party, he previously served as the United States representative from Washington Territory's at-large congressional district in 1889.

== Early life ==
Allen was born in Crawfordsville, Indiana on May 18, 1845.

== Career ==
He served as a private in the Union Army with the 135th Indiana Volunteers during the American Civil War. He earned a law degree from the University of Michigan and passed the bar in 1869.

He moved to Washington in 1870, and started a law practice in Olympia.

He served as United States Attorney for the District of Washington (1875–1885), and as reporter for the supreme court for the Territory of Washington from 1878 to 1885.

He was a Republican Delegate to the United States House of Representatives in 1889, and after Washington achieved statehood, he was elected and served in the United States Senate from 1889 to 1893. After the legislature failed to select a Senator for the following term, Allen was appointed by the Governor of Washington, but was not seated by the Senate.

== Death and legacy ==
After departing from public office, Allen pursued a career in private law practice in Seattle, Washington, where he eventually succumbed to cardiovascular disease in 1903.

John B. Allen Elementary School was inaugurated in 1904 as part of the Seattle School District. The school's architectural design was spearheaded by James Stephens, an architect within the Seattle School District. Initially, the two-story wooden building accommodated 278 students by the end of its inaugural year. Subsequently, in 1917, the District unveiled a second brick building, leading to an increase in enrollment, which reached its peak at 758 students in 1933. However, the school ceased operations in June 1981.

Political offices
Preceded by Charles Stewart Voorhees	Delegate to the United States House of Representatives from Washington Territory; March 4, 1889–November 11, 1889	Position eliminated at statehood
U.S. Senate
Position created at statehood	United States Senator from Washington; November 20, 1889–March 3, 1893	Succeeded by John L. Wilson
