= George Edward Cole =

6th Territorial Governor of Washington

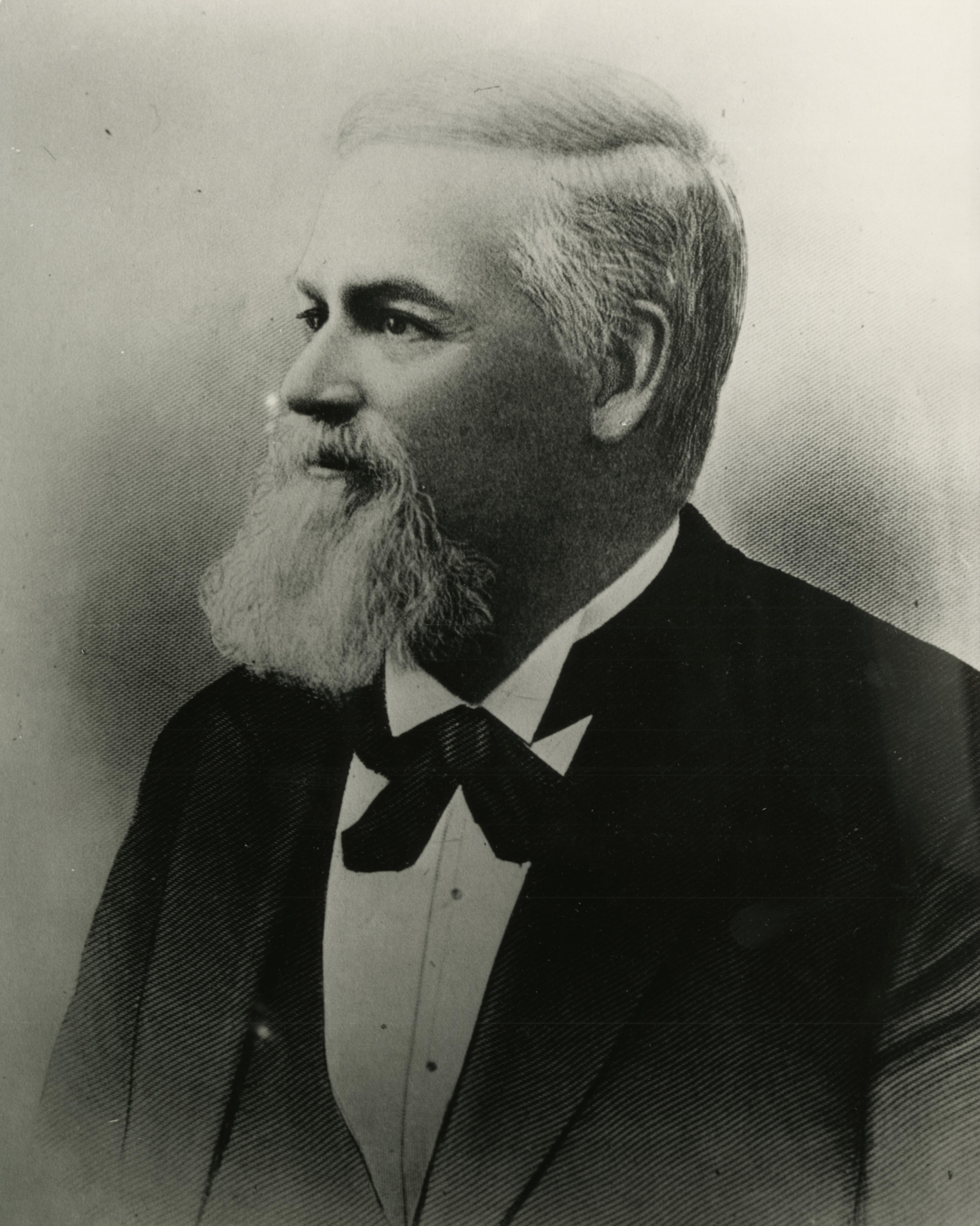

6th Governor of Washington Territory
- In office January 8, 1867 – March 4, 1867
- Appointed by: Andrew Johnson
- Preceded by: William Pickering
- Succeeded by: Marshall F. Moore

Delegate to the U.S. House of Representatives from Washington Territory's at-large district
- In office March 4, 1863 – March 3, 1865
- Preceded by: William H. Wallace
- Succeeded by: Arthur A. Denny

Personal details
- Born: December 23, 1826 Trenton, New York
- Died: December 3, 1906 (aged 79) Portland, Oregon
- Party: Democrat; Republican from the 1870s.

George Edward Cole (December 23, 1826 – December 3, 1906) was an American politician. He is remembered as the 6th governor and 5th delegate from the Territory of Washington.

== Biography ==
=== Early years ===
George Edward Cole was born December 23, 1826, in Trenton, Oneida County, New York. Cole attended the public schools and Hobart Hall Institute. He was employed as clerk in a country store.

After living in the Midwestern state of Illinois, Cole departed for California during the gold rush year of 1849. From there he moved to the Pacific Northwest, arriving in the Oregon Territory in 1850.

=== Oregon years ===
Cole soon became involved in the politics of the Oregon Territory, serving as a member of the Oregon House of Representatives in the Oregon Territorial Legislature during the biannual session running from 1852 to 1853. During that session he became an early supporter of the idea of splitting the territory — which then included the whole of today's states of Washington, Idaho, and the western portion of Montana — helping to draft a memorial to Congress calling for the establishment of the Washington Territory.

In Oregon Cole engaged in mercantile pursuits and steamboat transportation on the Willamette River. He served as clerk of the United States District Court of Oregon in 1859 and 1860.

=== Washington Territorial politician ===
Cole relocated to Walla Walla, Washington, in 1860. He was elected as the Washington Territory's delegate to Congress in 1862 as a Democrat, serving as a member of the Thirty-eighth Congress from March 4, 1863, to March 3, 1865. He was the first Washington Territorial Delegate to Congress to hail from the East side of the state. He would also be the last member of the Democratic Party to represent the Washington Territory in Congress until 1885. Cole served for one term only, not being a candidate for renomination in 1864.

In November 1866 Cole was appointed Governor of the Territory by Democratic President Andrew Johnson, serving in that position until March 4, 1867.

=== Railroad official and postmaster ===
With the Democrats out of power and himself out of office, Cole returned to Portland, Oregon, in 1867 where for the next four years he was instrumental in the operation of the Oregon & California Railroad, helping oversee construction of a line from Portland to the Southern Oregon town of Roseburg. In the interim he switched his allegiance to the Republican Party.

In 1873 Cole was appointed Postmaster of Portland by Republican President Ulysses S. Grant, taking reappointment to the post by President Rutherford B. Hayes in 1877. Following the expiration of his second term as Postmaster, Cole went to work for the Northern Pacific Railroad, remaining with the company through 1882.

Cole moved to Spokane, Washington, in 1889, was elected county treasurer of Spokane County, serving two terms in that position.

He also maintained extensive interests in mining, manufacturing, and farming.

== Death and legacy ==
George E. Cole died in Portland, Oregon, December 3, 1906. His body was interred in Lone Fir Cemetery in the city of his death.

== Published Works ==
- Cole, G. E. (1905). Early Oregon: jottings of personal recollections of a pioneer of 1850. publisher not identified. Available via Early Oregon 1850-1860 at the Internet Archive

U.S. House of Representatives
Preceded by William H. Wallace	Delegate to the U.S. House of Representatives from Washington Territory; 1865–1867	Succeeded by Arthur A. Denny
Political offices
Preceded by William Pickering	Territorial Governor of Washington; 1867	Succeeded by Marshall F. Moore
