= Washington Territory's at-large congressional district =

Former district electing a non-voting delegate

- Obsolete district
- Created: 1854, as a non-voting delegate was granted by Congress
- Eliminated: 1889, as a result of statehood
- Years active: 1854–1889

Until statehood in 1889, Washington Territory elected a non-voting delegate at-large to the United States House of Representatives.

== List of delegates representing the district ==
Delegate	Party	Years	Cong ress	District home
District established April 12, 1854
Columbia Lancaster (St. Helena)	Democratic	April 12, 1854 – March 3, 1855	33rd	Elected in April 1854. Lost renomination.
James Patton Anderson (Olympia)	Democratic	March 4, 1855 – March 3, 1857	34th	Elected in 1854. Retired.
Isaac Ingalls Stevens (Olympia)	Democratic	March 4, 1857 – March 3, 1861	35th 36th	Elected in 1856. Re-elected in 1858. Retired.
William H. Wallace (Steilacoom)	Republican	March 4, 1861 – March 3, 1863	37th	Elected in 1860. Retired.
George Edward Cole (Walla Walla)	Democratic	March 4, 1863 – March 3, 1865	38th	Elected in 1862. Retired.
Arthur Armstrong Denny (Seattle)	Republican	March 4, 1865 – March 3, 1867	39th	Elected in 1864. Retired.
Alvan Flanders (Walla Walla)	Republican	March 4, 1867 – March 3, 1869	40th	Elected in 1866. Retired.
Selucius Garfielde (Olympia)	Republican	March 4, 1869 – March 3, 1873	41st 42nd	Elected in 1868. Re-elected in 1870. Lost re-election.
Obadiah Benton McFadden (Olympia)	Democratic	March 4, 1873 – March 3, 1875	43rd	Elected in 1872. Retired.
Orange Jacobs (Seattle)	Republican	March 4, 1875 – March 3, 1879	44th 45th	Elected in 1874. Re-elected in 1876. Retired.
Thomas Hurley Brents (Walla Walla)	Republican	March 4, 1879 – March 3, 1885	46th 47th 48th	Elected in 1878. Re-elected in 1880. Re-elected in 1882. Lost renomination.
Charles Stewart Voorhees (Colfax)	Democratic	March 4, 1885 – March 3, 1889	49th 50th	Elected in 1884. Re-elected in 1886. Lost re-election.
John B. Allen (Seattle)	Republican	March 4, 1889 – November 11, 1889	51st	Elected in 1888. Retired to run for U.S. senator upon statehood.
District dissolved November 11, 1889

== See also ==
- United States Attorney for the District of Washington
