= Arthur A. Denny =

American politician

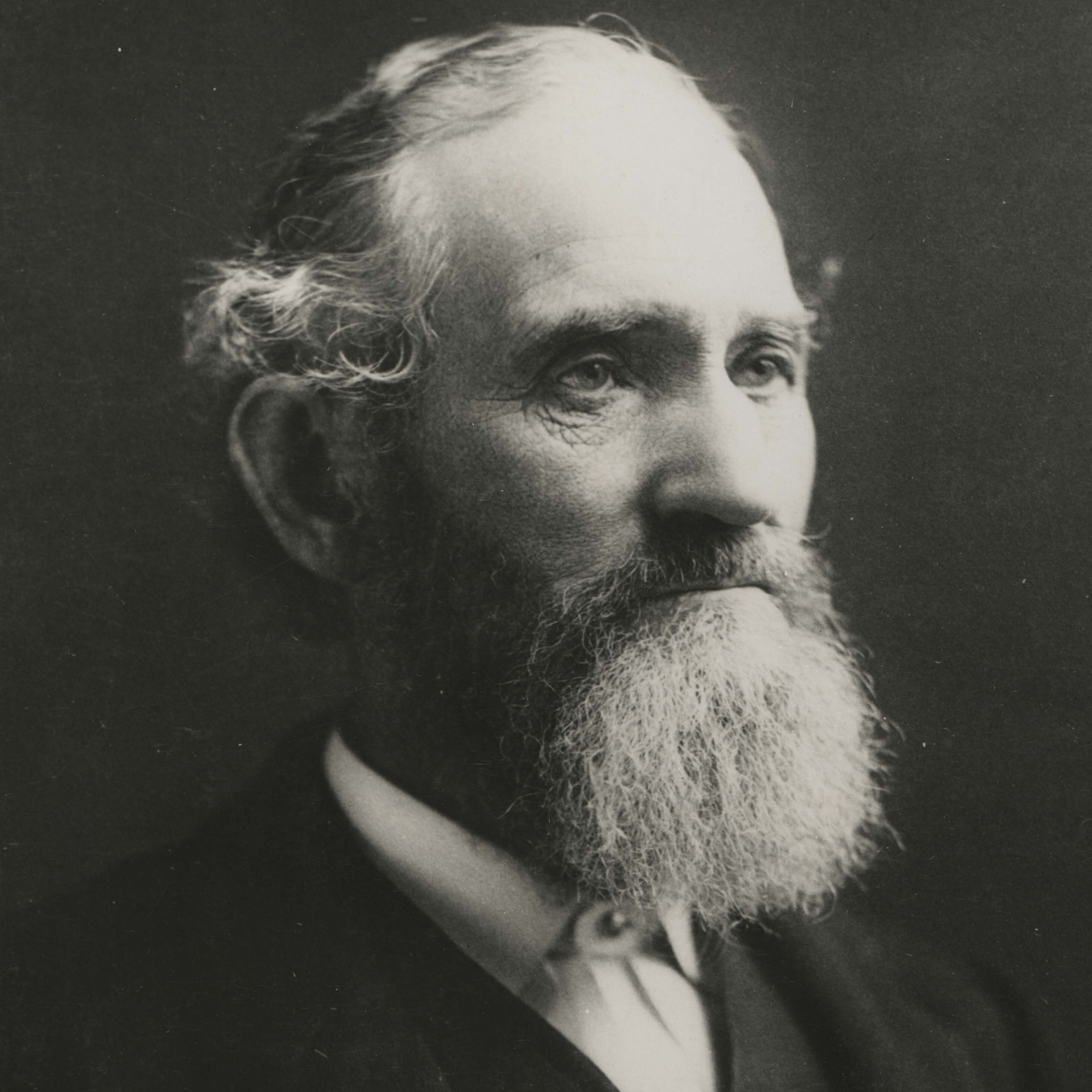
- Arthur Denny circa 1890

King County Commissioner
- In office January 1, 1853 – January 1, 1854
- Preceded by: Office established
- Succeeded by: Thomas Mercer

Personal details
- Born: Arthur Armstrong Denny; June 20, 1822 near Salem, Indiana, U.S.
- Died: January 9, 1899 (aged 76) Seattle, Washington, U.S.
- Resting place: Denny Family plot, Lake View Memorial Park, Seattle.
- Occupation: Pioneer, store owner, politician, author
- Writing career
- Notable works: Pioneer Days on Puget Sound

Arthur Armstrong Denny (June 20, 1822 – January 9, 1899) was an American politician and businessman who is regarded as one of the founders of Seattle, Washington. He founded the Denny Party, and was later the city's wealthiest citizen. He was a 9-term member of the territorial legislature. Seattle's former Denny Hill was named after him; it was flattened in a series of regrading projects and its former site is now known as the Denny Regrade. The city's Denny Way, however, is named not after Arthur Denny, but after his younger brother David Denny.

== Indiana, Illinois, and the way West ==
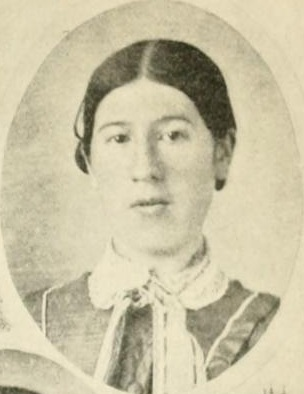
Mary Ann Boren, wife of Arthur A. Denny, copied for his book from a daguerreotype. The caption was confusing and this might be her sister Louisa Boren. See David Denny.

Denny was born near Salem, Indiana; by the time he was attending school his family had settled in Knox County, Illinois. His father, John Denny (1793–1875), fought in the western battles of the War of 1812 and later served in the Illinois state legislature, elected as a Whig. (He eventually traveled west with the Denny Party, but stayed on in Oregon's Willamette River Valley when Arthur and several others moved north to Puget Sound.) Denny did not have an easy childhood. He cared for his invalid mother while attending half-days in a log schoolhouse. He learned carpentry, taught school, studied surveying, and became a civil engineer and Knox County surveyor starting in 1843. In 1843, he married Mary Ann Boren; together they had six children: Louisa Catherine Frye, Margaret Leona Denny, Rolland Herschell Denny, Orion Orvil Denny, Arthur Wilson Denny, and Charles Latimer Denny.

In 1851, he led the Denny Party west. Leaving Illinois in April, they arrived in Portland, Oregon on August 23. In November, he booked passage on the schooner Exact and the party sailed on to Puget Sound, arriving at Alki Point on Elliott Bay on November 13, 1851. It soon became clear that Alki was not the best spot for a settlement. The Denny Party relocated to the east shore of Elliott Bay, near what is now Pioneer Square, the original heart of what became the city of Seattle.

== Career ==
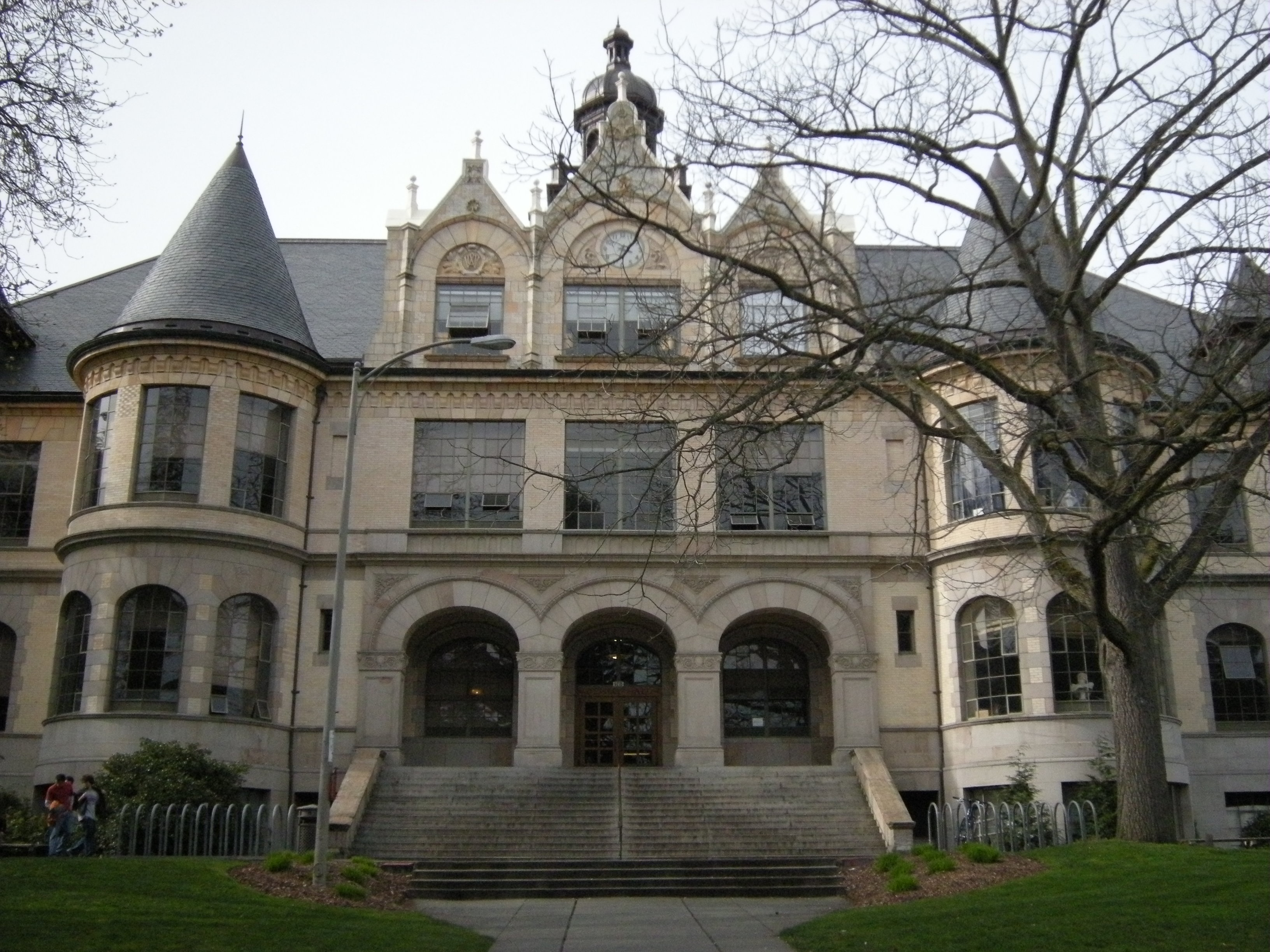
Denny Hall, University of Washington

On February 15, 1852, Denny and others filed their claims. Denny soon established himself selling cargo on commission for ship captains.

On November 25, 1852, Denny was a delegate at the Monticello Convention that produced a petition to US Congress to split the Oregon Territory, creating the Washington Territory, which would later become the state of Washington.

In 1854 when he began a general merchandise partnership with Dexter Horton and David Phillips. In 1855, he volunteered to serve in the Indian War then taking place in Washington Territory. He served in several political offices. He was a county commissioner first for Thurston County (in what was then still part of the Oregon Territory), and then, after Washington became a separate territory, for King County, where Seattle is located.

He also served as Seattle's first postmaster and in the territorial House of Representatives for nine consecutive terms, including serving a term as speaker. From 1861 to 1865 he was registrar of the United States General Land Office. He served as territorial delegate to the thirty-ninth United States Congress. Denny ran for Mayor of Seattle in 1886, but lost to William H. Shoudy, candidate of an anti-Chinese People's Party formed after the Seattle riot of 1886, by a margin of 41 votes out of 2,400 cast.

Denny soon turned from politics to business. He returned to being a partner with Horton and Phillips, this time by taking a half interest in Dexter Horton and Co., the bank founded by Horton and Phillips in 1870, which would eventually become Seattle-First National Bank. He was president of the Seattle and Walla Walla Railroad Company and an investor in the Great Western Iron and Steel Company. Later in life, he was active in the Society of Washington Pioneers and wrote a memoir, Pioneer Days in Puget Sound.

Among his other achievements, he was involved in founding the University of Washington and donated much of the land for its original site. On the current U.W. campus, Denny Hall, the former administration building (built 1895) is named in his honor.

In 1962, he was inducted into the Hall of Great Westerners of the National Cowboy & Western Heritage Museum.

== Personality and politics ==
Denny was an ascetic, a devout Christian (conservative in his religion to the point of opposing a divorce law), and a lifelong teetotaler. Indeed, he was teetotal to the point where he had the customers of his store buy their liquor direct from visiting ship captains so that he would not be involved in the transactions. He was a political conservative, and a cautious and conservative businessman and investor. Denny, in his memoir, described his decision to head north from Portland to Puget Sound as a "desperate venture". Lorraine McConaghy, historian at Seattle's Museum of History and Industry, agrees, but characterizes it further as "the only one he ever undertook."

=== Women's suffrage ===
Denny supported the right of women to vote, going so far as to introduce legislation in 1854 to allow white women of 18 years and older the right to vote. The resolution was voted down.

=== Argument over land ===
This dour man is nonetheless remembered for at least one example of his wit. In his memoir, recounting his failure in 1853 to reach agreement with David Swinson "Doc" Maynard over what was intended to be a joint plat of the town of Seattle, he wrote, "it was found that the doctor, who occasionally stimulated a little, had that day taken enough to cause him to feel that he was not only monarch of all he surveyed, but what Boren and I had surveyed as well."

It was later shown in a review done by a professional engineering firm on behalf of the city that it was in fact Denny that was wrong about the direction the streets should run and had actually violated the law in his plat of the city.

== Works ==
- Pioneer Days on Puget Sound (1888). (Text online)
- Pioneer Days on Puget sound, published by The Alice Harriman Company, Seattle, 1908 (Online text showing original pages)

== Notes ==
U.S. House of Representatives
Preceded by George E. Cole	Delegate to the U.S. House of Representatives from Washington Territory; 1865-1867	Succeeded by Alvan Flanders
