= Political party strength in Washington (state) =

Politics in the US state of Washington

The results of the 2024 presidential election in Washington

Washington ratified its constitution and held its first state elections in 1889, the year it was admitted to the union as a state. It established the positions of governor, lieutenant governor, Secretary of State, attorney general, state treasurer, state auditor, Commissioner of Public Lands, and Superintendent of Public Instruction. The position of insurance commissioner was legislatively established in 1907. All positions are elected to four-year terms, concurrent with presidential elections. Washington is one of three states that elects nine separate statewide officials, while six others elect ten.

The table also indicates the historical party composition in the State Senate, State House of Representatives, State delegation to the U.S. Senate, and State delegation to the U.S. House of Representatives. State senators are elected to four-year terms, with half elected every two years. State representatives are elected to two-year terms, and two from each of 49 legislative districts in separate elections.

While the U.S. state of Washington is considered a solidly Democratic state, it mainly elected Republican candidates during its first forty years of statehood. It currently holds the longest streak of Democratic governors in the nation, having last elected a Republican to the top executive office in 1980. (Note: This statistic includes only states; the District of Columbia has been controlled by elected Democrats since 1975.) The office of auditor has been held continuously by Democrats since 1933, when the national wave for President Franklin Roosevelt swept the party into every statewide race and congressional district except the uncontested office of superintendent of public instruction. That position was made nonpartisan in 1940. At the presidential level, Washington is part of the "blue wall", having voted for all Democratic nominees since 1988.

Prior to statehood, the President of the United States appointed a territorial governor and secretary of state, who served as acting governor when the governor was absent from the state. The position of attorney general was established in 1887, and only one person held office before statehood. A non-voting delegate was elected to the House of Representatives.

The nine members of the Washington Supreme Court are also elected statewide to six-year terms but on a nonpartisan basis and are not listed here. However all members of the court are considered liberal-leaning, matching the state's overall electorate.

Voters do not register as members of political parties.

The tables below show the history of officeholders elected to statewide executive offices, the state legislature, and the U.S. Congress, as well as the winners of the state's electoral college votes.

For years in which a presidential election was held, the table indicates which party's nominees received the state's electoral votes.

== Washington Territory ==
The first territorial superintendent of public education was elected by the legislature in 1861 to a three-year term, but the position was disestablished after just one year. It was reestablished in 1871, elected by the legislature to a two-year term. The superintendent was chair of the governor-appointed board of education, which met in the hometown of the superintendent in several cities around the state until statehood when the office remained in Olympia.

Year	Executive offices						Territorial Legislature		United States Congress
Year	Governor	Sec. of Territory	Attorney General	Treasurer	Auditor	Supt. of Pub. Inst.	Territorial Senate	Territorial House	Delegate
1853	Isaac Stevens (D)	Charles H. Mason	no such office	no such office	no such office	no such office	[?]	[?]	Columbia Lancaster (D)
1854	Isaac Stevens (D)	Charles H. Mason	no such office	William Cock	Daniel R. Bigelow	no such office	[?]	[?]	Columbia Lancaster (D)
1855	Isaac Stevens (D)	Charles H. Mason	no such office	William Cock	Daniel R. Bigelow	no such office	[?]	[?]	James Patton Anderson (D)
1856	Isaac Stevens (D)	Charles H. Mason	no such office	William Cock	J. M. Walker	no such office	[?]	[?]	James Patton Anderson (D)
1857	Fayette McMullen (D)	Charles H. Mason	no such office	William Cock	Henry R. Crosbie	no such office	[?]	[?]	Isaac Stevens (D)
1858	Fayette McMullen (D)	Charles H. Mason	no such office	David L. Phillips	Urban E. Hicks	no such office	[?]	[?]	Isaac Stevens (D)
1859	Richard D. Gholson (D)	Charles H. Mason	no such office	W. C. Rutledge	Urban E. Hicks	no such office	[?]	[?]	Isaac Stevens (D)
1860	Richard D. Gholson (D)	Henry M. McGill	no such office	W. C. Rutledge	Andrew Jackson Moses	no such office	[?]	[?]	Isaac Stevens (D)
1861	William H. Wallace (R)	Leander Jay Sharpe Turney (D)	no such office	Uzal G. Warbass	James Clark Head	Benjamin C. Lippincott	[?]	[?]	William H. Wallace (R)
1862	William Pickering (R)	Leander Jay Sharpe Turney (D)	no such office	Uzal G. Warbass	James Clark Head	no such office	[?]	[?]	William H. Wallace (R)
1863	William Pickering (R)	Elwood Evans (D)	no such office	David L. Phillips	R. M. Walker	no such office	[?]	[?]	George Edward Cole (D)
1864	William Pickering (R)	Elwood Evans (D)	no such office	William Cock	R. M. Walker	no such office	[?]	[?]	George Edward Cole (D)
1865	William Pickering (R)	Elwood Evans (D)	no such office	Daniel R. Bigelow	Urban E. Hicks	no such office	[?]	[?]	Arthur A. Denny (R)
1866	George Edward Cole (D)	Elwood Evans (D)	no such office	Benjamin F. Harned	Urban E. Hicks	no such office	[?]	[?]	Arthur A. Denny (R)
1867	Marshall F. Moore (R)	Ezra Leonard Smith	no such office	James Tilton	Urban E. Hicks	no such office	[?]	[?]	Alvan Flanders (R)
1868	Marshall F. Moore (R)	Ezra Leonard Smith	no such office	Benjamin F. Harned	John M. Murphy	no such office	[?]	[?]	Alvan Flanders (R)
1869	Alvan Flanders (R)	Ezra Leonard Smith	no such office	Benjamin F. Harned	John M. Murphy	no such office	[?]	[?]	Selucius Garfielde (R)
1870	Edward S. Salomon (R)	Ezra Leonard Smith	no such office	Benjamin F. Harned	John M. Murphy	no such office	[?]	[?]	Selucius Garfielde (R)
1871	Edward S. Salomon (R)	James F. Scott	no such office	Hill Harmon	J. G. Sparks	Nelson Rounds	[?]	[?]	Selucius Garfielde (R)
1872	Elisha P. Ferry (R)	James F. Scott	no such office	Josiah H. Munson	N. S. Potter	Nelson Rounds	[?]	[?]	Selucius Garfielde (R)
1873	Elisha P. Ferry (R)	Joseph C. Clements	no such office	Josiah H. Munson	John M. Murphy	Nelson Rounds	[?]	[?]	Obadiah B. McFadden (D)
1874	Elisha P. Ferry (R)	Henry G. Struve (R)	no such office	Elisha Treat Gunn	John M. Murphy	Nelson Rounds	[?]	[?]	Obadiah B. McFadden (D)
1875	Elisha P. Ferry (R)	Henry G. Struve (R)	no such office	Francis Tarbell	John R. Wheat	Nelson Rounds	[?]	[?]	Orange Jacobs (R)
1876	Elisha P. Ferry (R)	Henry G. Struve (R)	no such office	Francis Tarbell	John R. Wheat	Nelson Rounds	[?]	[?]	Orange Jacobs (R)
1877	Elisha P. Ferry (R)	Henry G. Struve (R)	no such office	Francis Tarbell	Thomas M. Reed (R)	John Paul Judson	[?]	[?]	Orange Jacobs (R)
1878	Elisha P. Ferry (R)	Nicholas Owings (R)	no such office	Francis Tarbell	Thomas M. Reed (R)	John Paul Judson	[?]	[?]	Orange Jacobs (R)
1879	Elisha P. Ferry (R)	Nicholas Owings (R)	no such office	Francis Tarbell	Thomas M. Reed (R)	Jonathan S. Houghton	[?]	[?]	Thomas Hurley Brents (R)
1880	William A. Newell (R)	Nicholas Owings (R)	no such office	Francis Tarbell	Thomas M. Reed (R)	Jonathan S. Houghton	[?]	[?]	Thomas Hurley Brents (R)
1881	William A. Newell (R)	Nicholas Owings (R)	no such office	Thomas N. Ford	Thomas M. Reed (R)	Charles W. Wheeler	[?]	[?]	Thomas Hurley Brents (R)
1882	William A. Newell (R)	Nicholas Owings (R)	no such office	Thomas N. Ford	Thomas M. Reed (R)	Charles W. Wheeler	[?]	[?]	Thomas Hurley Brents (R)
1883	William A. Newell (R)	Nicholas Owings (R)	no such office	Thomas N. Ford	Thomas M. Reed (R)	Robert C. Kerr	[?]	[?]	Thomas Hurley Brents (R)
1884	Watson C. Squire (R)	Nicholas Owings (R)	no such office	Thomas N. Ford	Thomas M. Reed (R)	Robert C. Kerr	[?]	[?]	Thomas Hurley Brents (R)
1885	Watson C. Squire (R)	Nicholas Owings (R)	no such office	Thomas N. Ford	Thomas M. Reed (R)	J. C. Lawrence	[?]	[?]	Charles Stewart Voorhees (D)
1886	Watson C. Squire (R)	Nicholas Owings (R)	no such office	William McMicken	Thomas M. Reed (R)	J. C. Lawrence	[?]	[?]	Charles Stewart Voorhees (D)
1887	Eugene Semple (D)	Nicholas Owings (R)	James B. Metcalfe (D)	William McMicken	Thomas M. Reed (R)	J. H. Morgan	[?]	[?]	Charles Stewart Voorhees (D)
1888	Eugene Semple (D)	Nicholas Owings (R)	James B. Metcalfe (D)	William McMicken	John M. Murphy	J. H. Morgan	[?]	[?]	Charles Stewart Voorhees (D)
1889	Miles Conway Moore (R)	Oliver Cromwell White	James B. Metcalfe (D)	Frank Irvin Blodgett	John M. Murphy	J. H. Morgan	[?]	[?]	John B. Allen (R)

== State of Washington ==
At statehood, the constitution established eight positions that would be elected statewide. The officials take office in the January following their election. The insurance commissioner was first elected in 1908.

Year	Executive offices									State Legislature		United States Congress			Electoral votes
Year	Governor	Lt. Governor	Sec. of State	Attorney General	Treasurer	Auditor	Comm. of Pub. Lands	Insurance Comm.	Supt. of Pub. Inst.	State Senate	State House	U.S. Senator (Class I)	U.S. Senator (Class III)	U.S. House	Electoral votes
1889	Elisha P. Ferry (R)	Charles E. Laughton (R)	Allan Weir (R)	William Carey Jones (R)	Addison Alexander; Lindsley (R)	Thomas M. Reed (R)	William T. Forrest (R)	no such office	Robert Bruce Bryan (R)	34R, 1D	61R, 8D, 1I	John B. Allen (R)	Watson C. Squire (R)	1R	
1890	Elisha P. Ferry (R)	Charles E. Laughton (R)	Allan Weir (R)	William Carey Jones (R)	Addison Alexander; Lindsley (R)	Thomas M. Reed (R)	William T. Forrest (R)	no such office	Robert Bruce Bryan (R)	34R, 1D	61R, 8D, 1I	John B. Allen (R)	Watson C. Squire (R)	1R	
1891	Elisha P. Ferry (R)	Charles E. Laughton (R)	Allan Weir (R)	William Carey Jones (R)	Addison Alexander; Lindsley (R)	Thomas M. Reed (R)	William T. Forrest (R)	no such office	Robert Bruce Bryan (R)	30R, 4D	60R, 18D	John B. Allen (R)	Watson C. Squire (R)	1R	
1892	Elisha P. Ferry (R)	Charles E. Laughton (R)	Allan Weir (R)	William Carey Jones (R)	Addison Alexander; Lindsley (R)	Thomas M. Reed (R)	William T. Forrest (R)	no such office	Robert Bruce Bryan (R)	30R, 4D	60R, 18D	John B. Allen (R)	Watson C. Squire (R)	1R	Harrison/ Reid (R) ✗
1893	John McGraw (R)	F. H. Luce (R)	James Price (R)	William Carey Jones (R)	Orzo A. Bowen (R)	Leban R. Grimes (R)	William T. Forrest (R)	no such office	Charles W. Bean (R)	25R, 9D	50R, 20D, 8P	vacant	Watson C. Squire (R)	2R	Harrison/ Reid (R) ✗
1894	John McGraw (R)	F. H. Luce (R)	James Price (R)	William Carey Jones (R)	Orzo A. Bowen (R)	Leban R. Grimes (R)	William T. Forrest (R)	no such office	Charles W. Bean (R)	25R, 9D	50R, 20D, 8P	vacant	Watson C. Squire (R)	2R	Harrison/ Reid (R) ✗
1895	John McGraw (R)	F. H. Luce (R)	James Price (R)	William Carey Jones (R)	Orzo A. Bowen (R)	John E. Frost (R)	William T. Forrest (R)	no such office	Charles W. Bean (R)	26R, 5D, 3Pop	54R, 20Pop, 4D	John L. Wilson (R)	Watson C. Squire (R)	2R	Harrison/ Reid (R) ✗
1896	John McGraw (R)	F. H. Luce (R)	James Price (R)	William Carey Jones (R)	Orzo A. Bowen (R)	John E. Frost (R)	William T. Forrest (R)	no such office	Charles W. Bean (R)	26R, 5D, 3Pop	54R, 20Pop, 4D	John L. Wilson (R)	Watson C. Squire (R)	2R	2 – Bryan/ Sewall (D/SvR) ✗ 2 – Bryan/ Watson (Pop) ✗
1897	John Rankin Rogers (Pop)	Thurston Daniels (Pop)	Will Jenkins (Pop)	Patrick Henry Winston (Pop)	Cyrus Wilber Young (Pop)	Neal Cheetham (Pop)	Robert Bridges (Pop)	no such office	Frank J. Browne (Pop)	15Pop, 13R, 4D, 2SvR (Note: A coalition between Democrats, Populists, and Silver Republicans elected a Populist, W.H. Plummer, as President Pro Tempore, and organized the chamber.)	45Pop, 12R, 11SvR, 10D	John L. Wilson (R)	George Turner (D)	1D, 1SvR	2 – Bryan/ Sewall (D/SvR) ✗ 2 – Bryan/ Watson (Pop) ✗
1898	John Rankin Rogers (Pop)	Thurston Daniels (Pop)	Will Jenkins (Pop)	Patrick Henry Winston (Pop)	Cyrus Wilber Young (Pop)	Neal Cheetham (Pop)	Robert Bridges (Pop)	no such office	Frank J. Browne (Pop)	15Pop, 13R, 4D, 2SvR	45Pop, 12R, 11SvR, 10D	John L. Wilson (R)	George Turner (D)	1D, 1SvR	2 – Bryan/ Sewall (D/SvR) ✗ 2 – Bryan/ Watson (Pop) ✗
1899	John Rankin Rogers (Pop)	Thurston Daniels (Pop)	Will Jenkins (Pop)	Patrick Henry Winston (Pop)	Cyrus Wilber Young (Pop)	Neal Cheetham (Pop)	Robert Bridges (Pop)	no such office	Frank J. Browne (Pop)	15R, 12Pop, 7D (Note: A coalition between Democrats and Populists elected a Populist-turned-Democrat, Augustus High, as President Pro Tempore, and organized the chamber.)	68R, 9Pop, 1Cit	Addison G. Foster (R)	George Turner (D)	2R	2 – Bryan/ Sewall (D/SvR) ✗ 2 – Bryan/ Watson (Pop) ✗
1900	John Rankin Rogers (Pop)	Thurston Daniels (Pop)	Will Jenkins (Pop)	Patrick Henry Winston (Pop)	Cyrus Wilber Young (Pop)	Neal Cheetham (Pop)	Robert Bridges (Pop)	no such office	Frank J. Browne (Pop)	15R, 12Pop, 7D	68R, 9Pop, 1Cit	Addison G. Foster (R)	George Turner (D)	2R	McKinley/ Roosevelt (R) ✓
1901	John Rankin Rogers (D) (Note: Died in office.)	Henry McBride (R)	Sam Nichols (R) (Note: Resigned.)	Wickliffe Stratton (R)	C. W. Maynard (R)	John D. Atkinson (R)	S. A. Callvert (R)	no such office	Robert Bruce Bryan (R)	26R, 8D	59R, 21D	Addison G. Foster (R)	George Turner (D)	2R	McKinley/ Roosevelt (R) ✓
1901	Henry McBride (R) (Note: As lieutenant governor, filled unexpired term.)	vacant	Sam Nichols (R)	Wickliffe Stratton (R)	C. W. Maynard (R)	John D. Atkinson (R)	S. A. Callvert (R)	no such office	Robert Bruce Bryan (R)	26R, 8D	59R, 21D	Addison G. Foster (R)	George Turner (D)	2R	McKinley/ Roosevelt (R) ✓
1902	Henry McBride (R)	vacant	Sam Nichols (R)	Wickliffe Stratton (R)	C. W. Maynard (R)	John D. Atkinson (R)	S. A. Callvert (R)	no such office	Robert Bruce Bryan (R)	26R, 8D	59R, 21D	Addison G. Foster (R)	George Turner (D)	2R	McKinley/ Roosevelt (R) ✓
1903	Henry McBride (R)	vacant	Sam Nichols (R)	Wickliffe Stratton (R)	C. W. Maynard (R)	John D. Atkinson (R)	S. A. Callvert (R)	no such office	Robert Bruce Bryan (R)	33R, 9D	80R, 14D	Addison G. Foster (R)	Levi Ankeny (R)	3R	McKinley/ Roosevelt (R) ✓
1904	Henry McBride (R)	vacant	Sam Nichols (R)	Wickliffe Stratton (R)	C. W. Maynard (R)	John D. Atkinson (R)	S. A. Callvert (R)	no such office	Robert Bruce Bryan (R)	33R, 9D	80R, 14D	Addison G. Foster (R)	Levi Ankeny (R)	3R	Roosevelt/ Fairbanks (R) ✓
1905	Albert E. Mead (R)	Charles E. Coon (R)	Sam Nichols (R)	John Atkinson (R)	George G. Mills (R)	Charles W. Clausen (R)	E. W. Ross (R)	no such office	Robert Bruce Bryan (R)	38R, 4D	90R, 4D	Samuel H. Piles (R)	Levi Ankeny (R)	3R	Roosevelt/ Fairbanks (R) ✓
1906	Albert E. Mead (R)	Charles E. Coon (R)	Sam Nichols (R)	John Atkinson (R)	George G. Mills (R)	Charles W. Clausen (R)	E. W. Ross (R)	no such office	Robert Bruce Bryan (R)	38R, 4D	90R, 4D	Samuel H. Piles (R)	Levi Ankeny (R)	3R	Roosevelt/ Fairbanks (R) ✓
1907	Albert E. Mead (R)	Charles E. Coon (R)	Sam Nichols (R)	John Atkinson (R)	George G. Mills (R)	Charles W. Clausen (R)	E. W. Ross (R)	no such office	Robert Bruce Bryan (R)	38R, 4D	85R, 9D	Samuel H. Piles (R)	Levi Ankeny (R)	3R	Roosevelt/ Fairbanks (R) ✓
1908	Albert E. Mead (R)	Charles E. Coon (R)	Sam Nichols (R)	John Atkinson (R)	George G. Mills (R)	Charles W. Clausen (R)	E. W. Ross (R)	no such office	Robert Bruce Bryan (R)	38R, 4D	85R, 9D	Samuel H. Piles (R)	Levi Ankeny (R)	3R	Taft/ Sherman (R) ✓
1909	Samuel G. Cosgrove (R)	Marion E. Hay (R)	Sam Nichols (R)	Walter Bell (R)	John G. Lewis (R)	Charles W. Clausen (R)	E. W. Ross (R)	John H. Schively (R)	Henry B. Dewey (R)	39R, 3D	88R, 6D	Samuel H. Piles (R)	Wesley Livsey Jones (R)	3R	Taft/ Sherman (R) ✓
1909	Marion E. Hay (R)	vacant	Ithamar Howell (R) (Note: Initially appointed by Governor to fill vacancy; later elected in his own right.)	Walter Bell (R)	John G. Lewis (R)	Charles W. Clausen (R)	E. W. Ross (R)	John H. Schively (R)	Henry B. Dewey (R)	39R, 3D	88R, 6D	Samuel H. Piles (R)	Wesley Livsey Jones (R)	3R	Taft/ Sherman (R) ✓
1910	Marion E. Hay (R)	vacant	Ithamar Howell (R)	Walter Bell (R)	John G. Lewis (R)	Charles W. Clausen (R)	E. W. Ross (R)	John H. Schively (R)	Henry B. Dewey (R)	39R, 3D	88R, 6D	Samuel H. Piles (R)	Wesley Livsey Jones (R)	3R	Taft/ Sherman (R) ✓
1911	Marion E. Hay (R)	vacant	Ithamar Howell (R)	William V. Tanner (R)	John G. Lewis (R)	Charles W. Clausen (R)	E. W. Ross (R)	John H. Schively (R)	Henry B. Dewey (R)	38R, 4D	84R, 13D	Miles Poindexter (R)	Wesley Livsey Jones (R)	3R	Taft/ Sherman (R) ✓
1912	Marion E. Hay (R)	vacant	Ithamar Howell (R)	William V. Tanner (R)	John G. Lewis (R)	Charles W. Clausen (R)	E. W. Ross (R)	John H. Schively (R)	Henry B. Dewey (R)	38R, 4D	84R, 13D	Miles Poindexter (R)	Wesley Livsey Jones (R)	3R	Roosevelt/ Johnson (Prog) ✗
1913	Ernest Lister (D)	Louis F. Hart (R)	Ithamar Howell (R)	William V. Tanner (R)	Edward Meath (R)	Charles W. Clausen (R)	Clark V. Savidge (R)	Herbert O. Fishback (R)	Josephine Corliss Preston (R)	27R, 9D, 6Prog	49R, 29Prog, 19D	Miles Poindexter (Prog)	Wesley Livsey Jones (R)	3R, 2Prog	Roosevelt/ Johnson (Prog) ✗
1914	Ernest Lister (D)	Louis F. Hart (R)	Ithamar Howell (R)	William V. Tanner (R)	Edward Meath (R)	Charles W. Clausen (R)	Clark V. Savidge (R)	Herbert O. Fishback (R)	Josephine Corliss Preston (R)	27R, 9D, 6Prog	49R, 29Prog, 19D	Miles Poindexter (Prog)	Wesley Livsey Jones (R)	3R, 2Prog	Roosevelt/ Johnson (Prog) ✗
1915	Ernest Lister (D)	Louis F. Hart (R)	Ithamar Howell (R)	William V. Tanner (R)	Edward Meath (R)	Charles W. Clausen (R)	Clark V. Savidge (R)	Herbert O. Fishback (R)	Josephine Corliss Preston (R)	29R, 7Prog, 6D	79R, 13D, 5Prog	Miles Poindexter (R)	Wesley Livsey Jones (R)	4R, 1D	Roosevelt/ Johnson (Prog) ✗
1916	Ernest Lister (D)	Louis F. Hart (R)	Ithamar Howell (R)	William V. Tanner (R)	Edward Meath (R)	Charles W. Clausen (R)	Clark V. Savidge (R)	Herbert O. Fishback (R)	Josephine Corliss Preston (R)	29R, 7Prog, 6D	79R, 13D, 5Prog	Miles Poindexter (R)	Wesley Livsey Jones (R)	4R, 1D	Wilson/ Marshall (D) ✓
1917	Ernest Lister (D)	Louis F. Hart (R)	Ithamar Howell (R)	William V. Tanner (R)	William Watts; Sherman (R)	Charles W. Clausen (R)	Clark V. Savidge (R)	Herbert O. Fishback (R)	Josephine Corliss Preston (R)	37R, 5D	83R, 14D	Miles Poindexter (R)	Wesley Livsey Jones (R)	4R, 1D	Wilson/ Marshall (D) ✓
1918	Ernest Lister (D)	Louis F. Hart (R)	Ithamar Howell (R)	William V. Tanner (R)	William Watts; Sherman (R)	Charles W. Clausen (R)	Clark V. Savidge (R)	Herbert O. Fishback (R)	Josephine Corliss Preston (R)	37R, 5D	83R, 14D	Miles Poindexter (R)	Wesley Livsey Jones (R)	4R, 1D	Wilson/ Marshall (D) ✓
1919	Louis F. Hart (R) (Note: As lieutenant governor, filled unexpired term, and was later elected in his own right.)	vacant	Ithamar Howell (R)	Lindsay Levant Thompson (R)	William Watts; Sherman (R)	Charles W. Clausen (R)	Clark V. Savidge (R)	Herbert O. Fishback (R)	Josephine Corliss Preston (R)	39R, 3D	87R, 10D	Miles Poindexter (R)	Wesley Livsey Jones (R)	5R	Wilson/ Marshall (D) ✓
1920	Louis F. Hart (R)	vacant	Jay Hinkle (R)	Lindsay Levant Thompson (R)	William Watts; Sherman (R)	Charles W. Clausen (R)	Clark V. Savidge (R)	Herbert O. Fishback (R)	Josephine Corliss Preston (R)	39R, 3D	87R, 10D	Miles Poindexter (R)	Wesley Livsey Jones (R)	5R	Harding/ Coolidge (R) ✓
1921	Louis F. Hart (R)	William J. Coyle (R)	Jay Hinkle (R)	Lindsay Levant Thompson (R)	Clifford L. Babcock (R)	Charles W. Clausen (R)	Clark V. Savidge (R)	Herbert O. Fishback (R)	Josephine Corliss Preston (R)	40R, 1D, 1FL	94R, 2FL, 1D	Miles Poindexter (R)	Wesley Livsey Jones (R)	5R	Harding/ Coolidge (R) ✓
1922	Louis F. Hart (R)	William J. Coyle (R)	Jay Hinkle (R)	Lindsay Levant Thompson (R)	Clifford L. Babcock (R)	Charles W. Clausen (R)	Clark V. Savidge (R)	Herbert O. Fishback (R)	Josephine Corliss Preston (R)	40R, 1D, 1FL	94R, 2FL, 1D	Miles Poindexter (R)	Wesley Livsey Jones (R)	5R	Harding/ Coolidge (R) ✓
1923	Louis F. Hart (R)	William J. Coyle (R)	Jay Hinkle (R)	John H. Dunbar (R)	Clifford L. Babcock (R)	Charles W. Clausen (R)	Clark V. Savidge (R)	Herbert O. Fishback (R)	Josephine Corliss Preston (R)	39R, 2FL, 1D	84R, 9D, 4FL	Clarence Dill (D)	Wesley Livsey Jones (R)	5R	Harding/ Coolidge (R) ✓
1923	Louis F. Hart (R)	William J. Coyle (R)	Jay Hinkle (R)	John H. Dunbar (R)	Clifford L. Babcock (R)	Charles W. Clausen (R)	Clark V. Savidge (R)	Herbert O. Fishback (R)	Josephine Corliss Preston (R)	39R, 2FL, 1D	84R, 9D, 4FL	Clarence Dill (D)	Wesley Livsey Jones (R)	4R, 1D	Harding/ Coolidge (R) ✓
1924	Louis F. Hart (R)	William J. Coyle (R)	Jay Hinkle (R)	John H. Dunbar (R)	Clifford L. Babcock (R)	Charles W. Clausen (R)	Clark V. Savidge (R)	Herbert O. Fishback (R)	Josephine Corliss Preston (R)	39R, 2FL, 1D	84R, 9D, 4FL	Clarence Dill (D)	Wesley Livsey Jones (R)	4R, 1D	Coolidge/ Dawes (R) ✓
1925	Roland H. Hartley (R)	W. Lon Johnson (R)	Jay Hinkle (R)	John H. Dunbar (R)	W. G. Potts (R)	Charles W. Clausen (R)	Clark V. Savidge (R)	Herbert O. Fishback (R)	Josephine Corliss Preston (R)	40R, 2D	92R, 5D	Clarence Dill (D)	Wesley Livsey Jones (R)	4R, 1D	Coolidge/ Dawes (R) ✓
1926	Roland H. Hartley (R)	W. Lon Johnson (R)	Jay Hinkle (R)	John H. Dunbar (R)	W. G. Potts (R)	Charles W. Clausen (R)	Clark V. Savidge (R)	Herbert O. Fishback (R)	Josephine Corliss Preston (R)	40R, 2D	92R, 5D	Clarence Dill (D)	Wesley Livsey Jones (R)	4R, 1D	Coolidge/ Dawes (R) ✓
1927	Roland H. Hartley (R)	W. Lon Johnson (R)	Jay Hinkle (R)	John H. Dunbar (R)	W. G. Potts (R)	Charles W. Clausen (R)	Clark V. Savidge (R)	Herbert O. Fishback (R)	Josephine Corliss Preston (R)	40R, 2D	89R, 8D	Clarence Dill (D)	Wesley Livsey Jones (R)	4R, 1D	Coolidge/ Dawes (R) ✓
1928	Roland H. Hartley (R)	W. Lon Johnson (R)	Jay Hinkle (R)	John H. Dunbar (R)	W. G. Potts (R)	Charles W. Clausen (R)	Clark V. Savidge (R)	Herbert O. Fishback (R)	Josephine Corliss Preston (R)	40R, 2D	89R, 8D	Clarence Dill (D)	Wesley Livsey Jones (R)	4R, 1D	Hoover/ Curtis (R) ✓
1929	Roland H. Hartley (R)	John Arthur Gellatly (R)	Jay Hinkle (R)	John H. Dunbar (R)	Charles W. Hinton (R)	Charles W. Clausen (R)	Clark V. Savidge (R)	Herbert O. Fishback (R)	Noah D. Showalter (R)	41R, 1D	91R, 6D	Clarence Dill (D)	Wesley Livsey Jones (R)	4R, 1D	Hoover/ Curtis (R) ✓
1930	Roland H. Hartley (R)	John Arthur Gellatly (R)	Jay Hinkle (R)	John H. Dunbar (R)	Charles W. Hinton (R)	Charles W. Clausen (R)	Clark V. Savidge (R)	Herbert O. Fishback (R)	Noah D. Showalter (R)	41R, 1D	91R, 6D	Clarence Dill (D)	Wesley Livsey Jones (R)	4R, 1D	Hoover/ Curtis (R) ✓
1931	Roland H. Hartley (R)	John Arthur Gellatly (R)	Jay Hinkle (R)	John H. Dunbar (R)	Charles W. Hinton (R)	Charles W. Clausen (R)	Clark V. Savidge (R)	Herbert O. Fishback (R)	Noah D. Showalter (R)	41R, 1D	90R, 7D	Clarence Dill (D)	Wesley Livsey Jones (R)	4R, 1D	Hoover/ Curtis (R) ✓
1932	Roland H. Hartley (R)	John Arthur Gellatly (R)	Jay Hinkle (R)	John H. Dunbar (R)	Charles W. Hinton (R)	Charles W. Clausen (R)	Clark V. Savidge (R)	Herbert O. Fishback (R)	Noah D. Showalter (R)	41R, 1D	90R, 7D	Clarence Dill (D)	Elijah S. Grammer (R)	4R, 1D	Roosevelt/ Garner (D) ✓
1933	Clarence D. Martin (D)	Victor Aloysius Meyers (D)	Ernest Hutchinson (D)	Garrison Hamilton (D)	Otto A. Case (D)	Cliff Yelle (D)	Albert C. Martin (D)	William A. Sullivan (D)	Noah D. Showalter (R)	25D, 21R	70D, 29R	Clarence Dill (D)	Homer Bone (D)	6D	Roosevelt/ Garner (D) ✓
1934	Clarence D. Martin (D)	Victor Aloysius Meyers (D)	Ernest Hutchinson (D)	Garrison Hamilton (D)	Otto A. Case (D)	Cliff Yelle (D)	Albert C. Martin (D)	William A. Sullivan (D)	Noah D. Showalter (R)	25D, 21R	70D, 29R	Clarence Dill (D)	Homer Bone (D)	6D	Roosevelt/ Garner (D) ✓
1935	Clarence D. Martin (D)	Victor Aloysius Meyers (D)	Ernest Hutchinson (D)	Garrison Hamilton (D)	Otto A. Case (D)	Cliff Yelle (D)	Albert C. Martin (D)	William A. Sullivan (D)	Noah D. Showalter (R)	41D, 5R	93D, 6R	Lewis B. Schwellenbach (D)	Homer Bone (D)	6D	Roosevelt/ Garner (D) ✓
1936	Clarence D. Martin (D)	Victor Aloysius Meyers (D)	Ernest Hutchinson (D)	Garrison Hamilton (D)	Otto A. Case (D)	Cliff Yelle (D)	Albert C. Martin (D)	William A. Sullivan (D)	Noah D. Showalter (R)	41D, 5R	93D, 6R	Lewis B. Schwellenbach (D)	Homer Bone (D)	6D	Roosevelt/ Garner (D) ✓
1937	Clarence D. Martin (D)	Victor Aloysius Meyers (D)	Ernest Hutchinson (D)	Garrison Hamilton (D)	Phil H. Gallagher (D)	Cliff Yelle (D)	Albert C. Martin (D)	William A. Sullivan (D)	Stanley F. Atwood (D)	37D, 9R	91D, 8R	Lewis B. Schwellenbach (D)	Homer Bone (D)	6D	Roosevelt/ Garner (D) ✓
1938	Clarence D. Martin (D)	Victor Aloysius Meyers (D)	Belle Reeves (D)	Garrison Hamilton (D)	Phil H. Gallagher (D)	Cliff Yelle (D)	Albert C. Martin (D)	William A. Sullivan (D)	Stanley F. Atwood (D)	37D, 9R	91D, 8R	Lewis B. Schwellenbach (D)	Homer Bone (D)	6D	Roosevelt/ Garner (D) ✓
1939	Clarence D. Martin (D)	Victor Aloysius Meyers (D)	Belle Reeves (D)	Garrison Hamilton (D)	Phil H. Gallagher (D)	Cliff Yelle (D)	Albert C. Martin (D)	William A. Sullivan (D)	Stanley F. Atwood (D)	40D, 6R	73D, 26R	Lewis B. Schwellenbach (D)	Homer Bone (D)	6D	Roosevelt/ Garner (D) ✓
1940	Clarence D. Martin (D)	Victor Aloysius Meyers (D)	Belle Reeves (D)	Garrison Hamilton (D)	Phil H. Gallagher (D)	Cliff Yelle (D)	Albert C. Martin (D)	William A. Sullivan (D)	Stanley F. Atwood (D)	40D, 6R	73D, 26R	Lewis B. Schwellenbach (D)	Homer Bone (D)	6D	Roosevelt/ Wallace (D) ✓
1941	Arthur B. Langlie (R)	Victor Aloysius Meyers (D)	Belle Reeves (D)	Smith Troy (D)	Otto A. Case (D)	Cliff Yelle (D)	Jack Taylor (D)	William A. Sullivan (D)	Pearl Anderson Wanamaker (NP/D)	37D, 9R	68D, 31R	Monrad Wallgren (D)	Homer Bone (D)	6D	Roosevelt/ Wallace (D) ✓
1942	Arthur B. Langlie (R)	Victor Aloysius Meyers (D)	Belle Reeves (D)	Smith Troy (D)	Otto A. Case (D)	Cliff Yelle (D)	Jack Taylor (D)	William A. Sullivan (D)	Pearl Anderson Wanamaker (NP/D)	37D, 9R	68D, 31R	Monrad Wallgren (D)	Homer Bone (D)	6D	Roosevelt/ Wallace (D) ✓
1943	Arthur B. Langlie (R)	Victor Aloysius Meyers (D)	Belle Reeves (D)	Smith Troy (D)	Otto A. Case (D)	Cliff Yelle (D)	Jack Taylor (D)	William A. Sullivan (D)	Pearl Anderson Wanamaker (NP/D)	27D, 19R	59D, 40R	Monrad Wallgren (D)	Homer Bone (D)	3D, 3R	Roosevelt/ Wallace (D) ✓
1944	Arthur B. Langlie (R)	Victor Aloysius Meyers (D)	Belle Reeves (D)	Smith Troy (D)	Otto A. Case (D)	Cliff Yelle (D)	Jack Taylor (D)	William A. Sullivan (D)	Pearl Anderson Wanamaker (NP/D)	27D, 19R	59D, 40R	Monrad Wallgren (D)	Homer Bone (D)	3D, 3R	Roosevelt/ Truman (D) ✓
1945	Monrad Wallgren (D)	Victor Aloysius Meyers (D)	Belle Reeves (D)	Smith Troy (D)	Russell H. Fluent (D)	Cliff Yelle (D)	Otto A. Case (D)	William A. Sullivan (D)	Pearl Anderson Wanamaker (NP/D)	32D, 14R	63D, 36R	Hugh Mitchell (D)	Warren Magnuson (D)	4D, 2R	Roosevelt/ Truman (D) ✓
1946	Monrad Wallgren (D)	Victor Aloysius Meyers (D)	Belle Reeves (D)	Smith Troy (D)	Russell H. Fluent (D)	Cliff Yelle (D)	Otto A. Case (D)	William A. Sullivan (D)	Pearl Anderson Wanamaker (NP/D)	32D, 14R	63D, 36R	Hugh Mitchell (D)	Warren Magnuson (D)	4D, 2R	Roosevelt/ Truman (D) ✓
1947	Monrad Wallgren (D)	Victor Aloysius Meyers (D)	Belle Reeves (D)	Smith Troy (D)	Russell H. Fluent (D)	Cliff Yelle (D)	Otto A. Case (D)	William A. Sullivan (D)	Pearl Anderson Wanamaker (NP/D)	23R, 23D (Note: A coalition of Republicans and nine conservative Democrats elected a Republican President Pro Tempore, Victor Zednick.)	72R, 27D	Harry P. Cain (R)	Warren Magnuson (D)	5R, 1D	Roosevelt/ Truman (D) ✓
1948	Monrad Wallgren (D)	Victor Aloysius Meyers (D)	Earl Coe (D)	Smith Troy (D)	Russell H. Fluent (D)	Cliff Yelle (D)	Otto A. Case (D)	William A. Sullivan (D)	Pearl Anderson Wanamaker (NP/D)	23R, 23D	72R, 27D	Harry P. Cain (R)	Warren Magnuson (D)	5R, 1D	Truman/ Barkley (D) ✓
1949	Arthur B. Langlie (R)	Victor Aloysius Meyers (D)	Earl Coe (D)	Smith Troy (D)	Tom Martin (D)	Cliff Yelle (D)	Jack Taylor (D)	William A. Sullivan (D)	Pearl Anderson Wanamaker (NP/D)	27R, 19D	67D, 32R	Harry P. Cain (R)	Warren Magnuson (D)	4R, 2D	Truman/ Barkley (D) ✓
1950	Arthur B. Langlie (R)	Victor Aloysius Meyers (D)	Earl Coe (D)	Smith Troy (D)	Tom Martin (D)	Cliff Yelle (D)	Jack Taylor (D)	William A. Sullivan (D)	Pearl Anderson Wanamaker (NP/D)	27R, 19D	67D, 32R	Harry P. Cain (R)	Warren Magnuson (D)	4R, 2D	Truman/ Barkley (D) ✓
1951	Arthur B. Langlie (R)	Victor Aloysius Meyers (D)	Earl Coe (D)	Smith Troy (D)	Tom Martin (D)	Cliff Yelle (D)	Jack Taylor (D)	William A. Sullivan (D)	Pearl Anderson Wanamaker (NP/D)	25D, 21R	54D, 45R	Harry P. Cain (R)	Warren Magnuson (D)	4R, 2D	Truman/ Barkley (D) ✓
1952	Arthur B. Langlie (R)	Victor Aloysius Meyers (D)	Earl Coe (D)	Smith Troy (D)	Tom Martin (D)	Cliff Yelle (D)	Jack Taylor (D)	William A. Sullivan (D)	Pearl Anderson Wanamaker (NP/D)	25D, 21R	54D, 45R	Harry P. Cain (R)	Warren Magnuson (D)	4R, 2D	Eisenhower/ Nixon (R) ✓
1953	Arthur B. Langlie (R)	Emmett T. Anderson (R)	Earl Coe (D)	Don Eastvold (R)	Charles R. Maybury (R)	Cliff Yelle (D)	Otto A. Case (D)	William A. Sullivan (D)	Pearl Anderson Wanamaker (NP/D)	25R, 21D	58R, 41D	Henry M. Jackson (D)	Warren Magnuson (D)	6R, 1D	Eisenhower/ Nixon (R) ✓
1954	Arthur B. Langlie (R)	Emmett T. Anderson (R)	Earl Coe (D)	Don Eastvold (R)	Charles R. Maybury (R)	Cliff Yelle (D)	Otto A. Case (D)	William A. Sullivan (D)	Pearl Anderson Wanamaker (NP/D)	25R, 21D	58R, 41D	Henry M. Jackson (D)	Warren Magnuson (D)	6R, 1D	Eisenhower/ Nixon (R) ✓
1955	Arthur B. Langlie (R)	Emmett T. Anderson (R)	Earl Coe (D)	Don Eastvold (R)	Charles R. Maybury (R)	Cliff Yelle (D)	Otto A. Case (D)	William A. Sullivan (D)	Pearl Anderson Wanamaker (NP/D)	24R, 22D	50D, 49R	Henry M. Jackson (D)	Warren Magnuson (D)	6R, 1D	Eisenhower/ Nixon (R) ✓
1956	Arthur B. Langlie (R)	Emmett T. Anderson (R)	Earl Coe (D)	Don Eastvold (R)	Charles R. Maybury (R)	Cliff Yelle (D)	Otto A. Case (D)	William A. Sullivan (D)	Pearl Anderson Wanamaker (NP/D)	24R, 22D	50D, 49R	Henry M. Jackson (D)	Warren Magnuson (D)	6R, 1D	Eisenhower/ Nixon (R) ✓
1957	Albert Rosellini (D)	John Cherberg (D)	Victor Aloysius Meyers (D)	John J. O'Connell (D)	Tom Martin (D)	Cliff Yelle (D)	Bert L. Cole (D)	William A. Sullivan (D)	Lloyd J. Andrews (NP/R)	31D, 15R	56D, 43R	Henry M. Jackson (D)	Warren Magnuson (D)	6R, 1D	Eisenhower/ Nixon (R) ✓
1958	Albert Rosellini (D)	John Cherberg (D)	Victor Aloysius Meyers (D)	John J. O'Connell (D)	Tom Martin (D)	Cliff Yelle (D)	Bert L. Cole (D)	William A. Sullivan (D)	Lloyd J. Andrews (NP/R)	31D, 15R	56D, 43R	Henry M. Jackson (D)	Warren Magnuson (D)	6R, 1D	Eisenhower/ Nixon (R) ✓
1959	Albert Rosellini (D)	John Cherberg (D)	Victor Aloysius Meyers (D)	John J. O'Connell (D)	Tom Martin (D)	Cliff Yelle (D)	Bert L. Cole (D)	William A. Sullivan (D)	Lloyd J. Andrews (NP/R)	35D, 14R	66D, 33R	Henry M. Jackson (D)	Warren Magnuson (D)	6R, 1D	Eisenhower/ Nixon (R) ✓
1960	Albert Rosellini (D)	John Cherberg (D)	Victor Aloysius Meyers (D)	John J. O'Connell (D)	Tom Martin (D)	Cliff Yelle (D)	Bert L. Cole (D)	William A. Sullivan (D)	Lloyd J. Andrews (NP/R)	35D, 14R	66D, 33R	Henry M. Jackson (D)	Warren Magnuson (D)	6R, 1D	Nixon/ Lodge (R) ✗
1961	Albert Rosellini (D)	John Cherberg (D)	Victor Aloysius Meyers (D)	John J. O'Connell (D)	Tom Martin (D)	Cliff Yelle (D)	Bert L. Cole (D)	Lee I. Kueckelhan (D)	Louis Bruno (NP)	36D, 13R	60D, 39R	Henry M. Jackson (D)	Warren Magnuson (D)	5R, 2D	Nixon/ Lodge (R) ✗
1962	Albert Rosellini (D)	John Cherberg (D)	Victor Aloysius Meyers (D)	John J. O'Connell (D)	Tom Martin (D)	Cliff Yelle (D)	Bert L. Cole (D)	Lee I. Kueckelhan (D)	Louis Bruno (NP)	36D, 13R	60D, 39R	Henry M. Jackson (D)	Warren Magnuson (D)	5R, 2D	Nixon/ Lodge (R) ✗
1963	Albert Rosellini (D)	John Cherberg (D)	Victor Aloysius Meyers (D)	John J. O'Connell (D)	Tom Martin (D)	Cliff Yelle (D)	Bert L. Cole (D)	Lee I. Kueckelhan (D)	Louis Bruno (NP)	32D, 17R	51D, 48R	Henry M. Jackson (D)	Warren Magnuson (D)	6R, 1D	Nixon/ Lodge (R) ✗
1964	Albert Rosellini (D)	John Cherberg (D)	Victor Aloysius Meyers (D)	John J. O'Connell (D)	Tom Martin (D)	Cliff Yelle (D)	Bert L. Cole (D)	Lee I. Kueckelhan (D)	Louis Bruno (NP)	32D, 17R	51D, 48R	Henry M. Jackson (D)	Warren Magnuson (D)	6R, 1D	Johnson/ Humphrey (D) ✓
1965	Daniel J. Evans (R)	John Cherberg (D)	Lud Kramer (R)	John J. O'Connell (D)	Robert S. O'Brien (D)	Robert V. Graham (D)	Bert L. Cole (D)	Lee I. Kueckelhan (D)	Louis Bruno (NP)	32D, 17R	60D, 39R	Henry M. Jackson (D)	Warren Magnuson (D)	5D, 2R	Johnson/ Humphrey (D) ✓
1966	Daniel J. Evans (R)	John Cherberg (D)	Lud Kramer (R)	John J. O'Connell (D)	Robert S. O'Brien (D)	Robert V. Graham (D)	Bert L. Cole (D)	Lee I. Kueckelhan (D)	Louis Bruno (NP)	32D, 17R	60D, 39R	Henry M. Jackson (D)	Warren Magnuson (D)	5D, 2R	Johnson/ Humphrey (D) ✓
1967	Daniel J. Evans (R)	John Cherberg (D)	Lud Kramer (R)	John J. O'Connell (D)	Robert S. O'Brien (D)	Robert V. Graham (D)	Bert L. Cole (D)	Lee I. Kueckelhan (D)	Louis Bruno (NP)	29D, 20R	55R, 44D	Henry M. Jackson (D)	Warren Magnuson (D)	5D, 2R	Johnson/ Humphrey (D) ✓
1968	Daniel J. Evans (R)	John Cherberg (D)	Lud Kramer (R)	John J. O'Connell (D)	Robert S. O'Brien (D)	Robert V. Graham (D)	Bert L. Cole (D)	Lee I. Kueckelhan (D)	Louis Bruno (NP)	29D, 20R	55R, 44D	Henry M. Jackson (D)	Warren Magnuson (D)	5D, 2R	Humphrey/ Muskie (D) ✗
1969	Daniel J. Evans (R)	John Cherberg (D)	Lud Kramer (R)	Slade Gorton (R)	Robert S. O'Brien (D)	Robert V. Graham (D)	Bert L. Cole (D)	Karl Hermann (D)	Louis Bruno (NP)	27D, 22R	56R, 43D	Henry M. Jackson (D)	Warren Magnuson (D)	5D, 2R	Humphrey/ Muskie (D) ✗
1970	Daniel J. Evans (R)	John Cherberg (D)	Lud Kramer (R)	Slade Gorton (R)	Robert S. O'Brien (D)	Robert V. Graham (D)	Bert L. Cole (D)	Karl Hermann (D)	Louis Bruno (NP)	27D, 22R	56R, 43D	Henry M. Jackson (D)	Warren Magnuson (D)	5D, 2R	Humphrey/ Muskie (D) ✗
1971	Daniel J. Evans (R)	John Cherberg (D)	Lud Kramer (R)	Slade Gorton (R)	Robert S. O'Brien (D)	Robert V. Graham (D)	Bert L. Cole (D)	Karl Hermann (D)	Louis Bruno (NP)	29D, 20R	51R, 48D	Henry M. Jackson (D)	Warren Magnuson (D)	6D, 1R	Humphrey/ Muskie (D) ✗
1972	Daniel J. Evans (R)	John Cherberg (D)	Lud Kramer (R)	Slade Gorton (R)	Robert S. O'Brien (D)	Robert V. Graham (D)	Bert L. Cole (D)	Karl Hermann (D)	Louis Bruno (NP)	29D, 20R	51R, 48D	Henry M. Jackson (D)	Warren Magnuson (D)	6D, 1R	Nixon/ Agnew (R) ✓
1973	Daniel J. Evans (R)	John Cherberg (D)	Lud Kramer (R)	Slade Gorton (R)	Robert S. O'Brien (D)	Robert V. Graham (D)	Bert L. Cole (D)	Karl Hermann (D)	Frank Brouillet (NP/D)	30D, 19R	57D, 41R	Henry M. Jackson (D)	Warren Magnuson (D)	6D, 1R	Nixon/ Agnew (R) ✓
1974	Daniel J. Evans (R)	John Cherberg (D)	Lud Kramer (R)	Slade Gorton (R)	Robert S. O'Brien (D)	Robert V. Graham (D)	Bert L. Cole (D)	Karl Hermann (D)	Frank Brouillet (NP/D)	30D, 19R	57D, 41R	Henry M. Jackson (D)	Warren Magnuson (D)	6D, 1R	Nixon/ Agnew (R) ✓
1975	Daniel J. Evans (R)	John Cherberg (D)	Bruce Chapman (R)	Slade Gorton (R)	Robert S. O'Brien (D)	Robert V. Graham (D)	Bert L. Cole (D)	Karl Hermann (D)	Frank Brouillet (NP/D)	30D, 19R	62D, 36R	Henry M. Jackson (D)	Warren Magnuson (D)	6D, 1R	Nixon/ Agnew (R) ✓
1976	Daniel J. Evans (R)	John Cherberg (D)	Bruce Chapman (R)	Slade Gorton (R)	Robert S. O'Brien (D)	Robert V. Graham (D)	Bert L. Cole (D)	Karl Hermann (D)	Frank Brouillet (NP/D)	30D, 19R	62D, 36R	Henry M. Jackson (D)	Warren Magnuson (D)	6D, 1R	Ford/ Dole (R) ✗
1977	Dixy Lee Ray (D)	John Cherberg (D)	Bruce Chapman (R)	Slade Gorton (R)	Robert S. O'Brien (D)	Robert V. Graham (D)	Bert L. Cole (D)	Richard G. Marquardt (R)	Frank Brouillet (NP/D)	30D, 19R	62D, 36R	Henry M. Jackson (D)	Warren Magnuson (D)	5D, 2R	Ford/ Dole (R) ✗
1978	Dixy Lee Ray (D)	John Cherberg (D)	Bruce Chapman (R)	Slade Gorton (R)	Robert S. O'Brien (D)	Robert V. Graham (D)	Bert L. Cole (D)	Richard G. Marquardt (R)	Frank Brouillet (NP/D)	30D, 19R	62D, 36R	Henry M. Jackson (D)	Warren Magnuson (D)	5D, 2R	Ford/ Dole (R) ✗
1979	Dixy Lee Ray (D)	John Cherberg (D)	Bruce Chapman (R)	Slade Gorton (R)	Robert S. O'Brien (D)	Robert V. Graham (D)	Bert L. Cole (D)	Richard G. Marquardt (R)	Frank Brouillet (NP/D)	30D, 19R	49D, 49R (Note: A power-sharing agreement was negotiated, and co-Speakers from both parties were elected. All committees were co-chaired and evenly divided between the parties.)	Henry M. Jackson (D)	Warren Magnuson (D)	6D, 1R	Ford/ Dole (R) ✗
1980	Dixy Lee Ray (D)	John Cherberg (D)	Bruce Chapman (R)	Slade Gorton (R)	Robert S. O'Brien (D)	Robert V. Graham (D)	Bert L. Cole (D)	Richard G. Marquardt (R)	Frank Brouillet (NP/D)	30D, 19R	49D, 49R	Henry M. Jackson (D)	Warren Magnuson (D)	6D, 1R	Reagan/ Bush (R) ✓
1981	John Spellman (R)	John Cherberg (D)	Ralph Munro (R)	Ken Eikenberry (R)	Robert S. O'Brien (D)	Robert V. Graham (D)	Brian Boyle (R)	Richard G. Marquardt (R)	Frank Brouillet (NP/D)	25R, 24D (Note: A legislator switched parties from Democratic to Republican, giving the Republicans the majority.)	56R, 42D	Henry M. Jackson (D)	Slade Gorton (R)	5D, 2R	Reagan/ Bush (R) ✓
1982	John Spellman (R)	John Cherberg (D)	Ralph Munro (R)	Ken Eikenberry (R)	Robert S. O'Brien (D)	Robert V. Graham (D)	Brian Boyle (R)	Richard G. Marquardt (R)	Frank Brouillet (NP/D)	25R, 24D	55R, 43D (Note: A special election flipped a seat from the Republicans to the Democrats.)	Henry M. Jackson (D)	Slade Gorton (R)	5D, 2R	Reagan/ Bush (R) ✓
1983	John Spellman (R)	John Cherberg (D)	Ralph Munro (R)	Ken Eikenberry (R)	Robert S. O'Brien (D)	Robert V. Graham (D)	Brian Boyle (R)	Richard G. Marquardt (R)	Frank Brouillet (NP/D)	26D, 23R	54D, 44R	Daniel J. Evans (R)	Slade Gorton (R)	5D, 3R	Reagan/ Bush (R) ✓
1984	John Spellman (R)	John Cherberg (D)	Ralph Munro (R)	Ken Eikenberry (R)	Robert S. O'Brien (D)	Robert V. Graham (D)	Brian Boyle (R)	Richard G. Marquardt (R)	Frank Brouillet (NP/D)	26D, 23R	53D, 45R	Daniel J. Evans (R)	Slade Gorton (R)	5D, 3R	Reagan/ Bush (R) ✓
1985	Booth Gardner (D)	John Cherberg (D)	Ralph Munro (R)	Ken Eikenberry (R)	Robert S. O'Brien (D)	Robert V. Graham (D)	Brian Boyle (R)	Richard G. Marquardt (R)	Frank Brouillet (NP/D)	27D, 22R	53D, 45R	Daniel J. Evans (R)	Slade Gorton (R)	5D, 3R	Reagan/ Bush (R) ✓
1986	Booth Gardner (D)	John Cherberg (D)	Ralph Munro (R)	Ken Eikenberry (R)	Robert S. O'Brien (D)	Robert V. Graham (D)	Brian Boyle (R)	Richard G. Marquardt (R)	Frank Brouillet (NP/D)	27D, 22R	53D, 45R	Daniel J. Evans (R)	Slade Gorton (R)	5D, 3R	Reagan/ Bush (R) ✓
1987	Booth Gardner (D)	John Cherberg (D)	Ralph Munro (R)	Ken Eikenberry (R)	Robert S. O'Brien (D)	Robert V. Graham (D)	Brian Boyle (R)	Richard G. Marquardt (R)	Frank Brouillet (NP/D)	25D, 24R	61D, 37R	Daniel J. Evans (R)	Brock Adams (D)	5D, 3R	Reagan/ Bush (R) ✓
1988	Booth Gardner (D)	John Cherberg (D)	Ralph Munro (R)	Ken Eikenberry (R)	Robert S. O'Brien (D)	Robert V. Graham (D)	Brian Boyle (R)	Richard G. Marquardt (R)	Frank Brouillet (NP/D)	25R, 24D (Note: A special election flipped a seat from the Democrats to the Republicans, flipping the chamber.)	61D, 37R	Daniel J. Evans (R)	Brock Adams (D)	5D, 3R	Dukakis/ Bentsen (D) ✗
1989	Booth Gardner (D)	Joel Pritchard (R)	Ralph Munro (R)	Ken Eikenberry (R)	Dan Grimm (D)	Robert V. Graham (D)	Brian Boyle (R)	Richard G. Marquardt (R)	Judy Billings (NP/D)	25R, 24D	63D, 35R	Slade Gorton (R)	Brock Adams (D)	5D, 3R	Dukakis/ Bentsen (D) ✗
1990	Booth Gardner (D)	Joel Pritchard (R)	Ralph Munro (R)	Ken Eikenberry (R)	Dan Grimm (D)	Robert V. Graham (D)	Brian Boyle (R)	Richard G. Marquardt (R)	Judy Billings (NP/D)	25R, 24D	63D, 35R	Slade Gorton (R)	Brock Adams (D)	5D, 3R	Dukakis/ Bentsen (D) ✗
1991	Booth Gardner (D)	Joel Pritchard (R)	Ralph Munro (R)	Ken Eikenberry (R)	Dan Grimm (D)	Robert V. Graham (D)	Brian Boyle (R)	Richard G. Marquardt (R)	Judy Billings (NP/D)	25R, 24D	58D, 40R	Slade Gorton (R)	Brock Adams (D)	5D, 3R	Dukakis/ Bentsen (D) ✗
1992	Booth Gardner (D)	Joel Pritchard (R)	Ralph Munro (R)	Ken Eikenberry (R)	Dan Grimm (D)	Robert V. Graham (D)	Brian Boyle (R)	Richard G. Marquardt (R)	Judy Billings (NP/D)	25R, 24D	58D, 40R	Slade Gorton (R)	Brock Adams (D)	5D, 3R	Clinton/ Gore (D) ✓
1993	Mike Lowry (D)	Joel Pritchard (R)	Ralph Munro (R)	Christine Gregoire (D)	Dan Grimm (D)	Brian Sonntag (D)	Jennifer Belcher (D)	Deborah Senn (D)	Judy Billings (NP/D)	28D, 21R	65D, 33R	Slade Gorton (R)	Patty Murray (D)	8D, 1R	Clinton/ Gore (D) ✓
1994	Mike Lowry (D)	Joel Pritchard (R)	Ralph Munro (R)	Christine Gregoire (D)	Dan Grimm (D)	Brian Sonntag (D)	Jennifer Belcher (D)	Deborah Senn (D)	Judy Billings (NP/D)	28D, 21R	65D, 33R	Slade Gorton (R)	Patty Murray (D)	8D, 1R	Clinton/ Gore (D) ✓
1995	Mike Lowry (D)	Joel Pritchard (R)	Ralph Munro (R)	Christine Gregoire (D)	Dan Grimm (D)	Brian Sonntag (D)	Jennifer Belcher (D)	Deborah Senn (D)	Judy Billings (NP/D)	25D, 24R	61R, 37D (Note: A legislator switched parties from Democratic to Republican.)	Slade Gorton (R)	Patty Murray (D)	7R, 2D	Clinton/ Gore (D) ✓
1996	Mike Lowry (D)	Joel Pritchard (R)	Ralph Munro (R)	Christine Gregoire (D)	Dan Grimm (D)	Brian Sonntag (D)	Jennifer Belcher (D)	Deborah Senn (D)	Judy Billings (NP/D)	25D, 24R	62R, 36D	Slade Gorton (R)	Patty Murray (D)	7R, 2D	Clinton/ Gore (D) ✓
1997	Gary Locke (D)	Brad Owen (D)	Ralph Munro (R)	Christine Gregoire (D)	Mike Murphy (D)	Brian Sonntag (D)	Jennifer Belcher (D)	Deborah Senn (D)	Terry Bergeson (NP/D)	26R, 23D	56R, 42D	Slade Gorton (R)	Patty Murray (D)	6R, 3D	Clinton/ Gore (D) ✓
1998	Gary Locke (D)	Brad Owen (D)	Ralph Munro (R)	Christine Gregoire (D)	Mike Murphy (D)	Brian Sonntag (D)	Jennifer Belcher (D)	Deborah Senn (D)	Terry Bergeson (NP/D)	26R, 23D	57R, 41D (Note: A special election flipped a seat from the Democrats to the Republicans.)	Slade Gorton (R)	Patty Murray (D)	6R, 3D	Clinton/ Gore (D) ✓
1999	Gary Locke (D)	Brad Owen (D)	Ralph Munro (R)	Christine Gregoire (D)	Mike Murphy (D)	Brian Sonntag (D)	Jennifer Belcher (D)	Deborah Senn (D)	Terry Bergeson (NP/D)	27D, 23R	49D, 49R	Slade Gorton (R)	Patty Murray (D)	5D, 4R	Clinton/ Gore (D) ✓
2000	Gary Locke (D)	Brad Owen (D)	Ralph Munro (R)	Christine Gregoire (D)	Mike Murphy (D)	Brian Sonntag (D)	Jennifer Belcher (D)	Deborah Senn (D)	Terry Bergeson (NP/D)	27D, 23R	49D, 49R	Slade Gorton (R)	Patty Murray (D)	5D, 4R	Gore/ Lieberman (D) ✗
2001	Gary Locke (D)	Brad Owen (D)	Sam Reed (R)	Christine Gregoire (D)	Mike Murphy (D)	Brian Sonntag (D)	Doug Sutherland (R)	Mike Kreidler (D)	Terry Bergeson (NP/D)	25D, 24R	49D, 49R	Maria Cantwell (D)	Patty Murray (D)	6D, 3R	Gore/ Lieberman (D) ✗
2002	Gary Locke (D)	Brad Owen (D)	Sam Reed (R)	Christine Gregoire (D)	Mike Murphy (D)	Brian Sonntag (D)	Doug Sutherland (R)	Mike Kreidler (D)	Terry Bergeson (NP/D)	25D, 24R	50D, 48R (Note: A special election flipped a seat from the Republicans to the Democrats, breaking the tie and flipping the chamber.)	Maria Cantwell (D)	Patty Murray (D)	6D, 3R	Gore/ Lieberman (D) ✗
2003	Gary Locke (D)	Brad Owen (D)	Sam Reed (R)	Christine Gregoire (D)	Mike Murphy (D)	Brian Sonntag (D)	Doug Sutherland (R)	Mike Kreidler (D)	Terry Bergeson (NP/D)	25R, 24D	52D, 46R	Maria Cantwell (D)	Patty Murray (D)	6D, 3R	Gore/ Lieberman (D) ✗
2004	Gary Locke (D)	Brad Owen (D)	Sam Reed (R)	Christine Gregoire (D)	Mike Murphy (D)	Brian Sonntag (D)	Doug Sutherland (R)	Mike Kreidler (D)	Terry Bergeson (NP/D)	25R, 24D	52D, 46R	Maria Cantwell (D)	Patty Murray (D)	6D, 3R	Kerry/ Edwards (D) ✗
2005	Christine Gregoire (D)	Brad Owen (D)	Sam Reed (R)	Rob McKenna (R)	Mike Murphy (D)	Brian Sonntag (D)	Doug Sutherland (R)	Mike Kreidler (D)	Terry Bergeson (NP/D)	26D, 23R	55D, 43R	Maria Cantwell (D)	Patty Murray (D)	6D, 3R	Kerry/ Edwards (D) ✗
2006	Christine Gregoire (D)	Brad Owen (D)	Sam Reed (R)	Rob McKenna (R)	Mike Murphy (D)	Brian Sonntag (D)	Doug Sutherland (R)	Mike Kreidler (D)	Terry Bergeson (NP/D)	26D, 23R	55D, 43R	Maria Cantwell (D)	Patty Murray (D)	6D, 3R	Kerry/ Edwards (D) ✗
2007	Christine Gregoire (D)	Brad Owen (D)	Sam Reed (R)	Rob McKenna (R)	Mike Murphy (D)	Brian Sonntag (D)	Doug Sutherland (R)	Mike Kreidler (D)	Terry Bergeson (NP/D)	32D, 17R	62D, 36R	Maria Cantwell (D)	Patty Murray (D)	6D, 3R	Kerry/ Edwards (D) ✗
2008	Christine Gregoire (D)	Brad Owen (D)	Sam Reed (R)	Rob McKenna (R)	Mike Murphy (D)	Brian Sonntag (D)	Doug Sutherland (R)	Mike Kreidler (D)	Terry Bergeson (NP/D)	32D, 17R	63D, 35R (Note: A legislator switched parties from Republican to Democratic.)	Maria Cantwell (D)	Patty Murray (D)	6D, 3R	Obama/ Biden (D) ✓
2009	Christine Gregoire (D)	Brad Owen (D)	Sam Reed (R)	Rob McKenna (R)	Jim McIntire (D)	Brian Sonntag (D)	Peter J. Goldmark (D)	Mike Kreidler (D)	Randy Dorn (NP/D)	31D, 18R	62D, 36R	Maria Cantwell (D)	Patty Murray (D)	6D, 3R	Obama/ Biden (D) ✓
2010	Christine Gregoire (D)	Brad Owen (D)	Sam Reed (R)	Rob McKenna (R)	Jim McIntire (D)	Brian Sonntag (D)	Peter J. Goldmark (D)	Mike Kreidler (D)	Randy Dorn (NP/D)	31D, 18R	61D, 37R	Maria Cantwell (D)	Patty Murray (D)	6D, 3R	Obama/ Biden (D) ✓
2011	Christine Gregoire (D)	Brad Owen (D)	Sam Reed (R)	Rob McKenna (R)	Jim McIntire (D)	Brian Sonntag (D)	Peter J. Goldmark (D)	Mike Kreidler (D)	Randy Dorn (NP/D)	27D, 22R	56D, 42R	Maria Cantwell (D)	Patty Murray (D)	5D, 4R	Obama/ Biden (D) ✓
2012	Christine Gregoire (D)	Brad Owen (D)	Sam Reed (R)	Rob McKenna (R)	Jim McIntire (D)	Brian Sonntag (D)	Peter J. Goldmark (D)	Mike Kreidler (D)	Randy Dorn (NP/D)	27D, 22R	56D, 42R	Maria Cantwell (D)	Patty Murray (D)	5D, 4R	Obama/ Biden (D) ✓
2013	Jay Inslee (D)	Brad Owen (D)	Kim Wyman (R)	Bob Ferguson (D)	Jim McIntire (D)	Troy Kelley (D)	Peter J. Goldmark (D)	Mike Kreidler (D)	Randy Dorn (NP/D)	26D, 23R (Note: A coalition of 2 Democrats and 23 Republicans controlled the Senate Majority.)	55D, 43R	Maria Cantwell (D)	Patty Murray (D)	6D, 4R	Obama/ Biden (D) ✓
2014	Jay Inslee (D)	Brad Owen (D)	Kim Wyman (R)	Bob Ferguson (D)	Jim McIntire (D)	Troy Kelley (D)	Peter J. Goldmark (D)	Mike Kreidler (D)	Randy Dorn (NP/D)	25D, 24R	55D, 43R	Maria Cantwell (D)	Patty Murray (D)	6D, 4R	Obama/ Biden (D) ✓
2015	Jay Inslee (D)	Brad Owen (D)	Kim Wyman (R)	Bob Ferguson (D)	Jim McIntire (D)	Troy Kelley (D)	Peter J. Goldmark (D)	Mike Kreidler (D)	Randy Dorn (NP/D)	25R, 24D (Note: One conservative Democrat caucused with the Republicans.)	51D, 47R	Maria Cantwell (D)	Patty Murray (D)	6D, 4R	Obama/ Biden (D) ✓
2016	Jay Inslee (D)	Brad Owen (D)	Kim Wyman (R)	Bob Ferguson (D)	Jim McIntire (D)	Troy Kelley (D)	Peter J. Goldmark (D)	Mike Kreidler (D)	Randy Dorn (NP/D)	25R, 24D	50D, 48R	Maria Cantwell (D)	Patty Murray (D)	6D, 4R	Clinton/ Kaine (D) ✗
2017	Jay Inslee (D)	Cyrus Habib (D)	Kim Wyman (R)	Bob Ferguson (D)	Duane Davidson (R)	Pat McCarthy (D)	Hilary Franz (D)	Mike Kreidler (D)	Chris Reykdal (NP/D)	25D, 24R	50D, 48R	Maria Cantwell (D)	Patty Murray (D)	6D, 4R	Clinton/ Kaine (D) ✗
2018	Jay Inslee (D)	Cyrus Habib (D)	Kim Wyman (R)	Bob Ferguson (D)	Duane Davidson (R)	Pat McCarthy (D)	Hilary Franz (D)	Mike Kreidler (D)	Chris Reykdal (NP/D)	26D, 23R	50D, 48R	Maria Cantwell (D)	Patty Murray (D)	6D, 4R	Clinton/ Kaine (D) ✗
2019	Jay Inslee (D)	Cyrus Habib (D)	Kim Wyman (R)	Bob Ferguson (D)	Duane Davidson (R)	Pat McCarthy (D)	Hilary Franz (D)	Mike Kreidler (D)	Chris Reykdal (NP/D)	29D, 20R	57D, 41R	Maria Cantwell (D)	Patty Murray (D)	7D, 3R	Clinton/ Kaine (D) ✗
2020	Jay Inslee (D)	Cyrus Habib (D)	Kim Wyman (R)	Bob Ferguson (D)	Duane Davidson (R)	Pat McCarthy (D)	Hilary Franz (D)	Mike Kreidler (D)	Chris Reykdal (NP/D)	29D, 20R	57D, 41R	Maria Cantwell (D)	Patty Murray (D)	7D, 3R	Biden/ Harris (D) ✓
2021	Jay Inslee (D)	Denny Heck (D)	Kim Wyman (R)	Bob Ferguson (D)	Mike Pellicciotti (D)	Pat McCarthy (D)	Hilary Franz (D)	Mike Kreidler (D)	Chris Reykdal (NP/D)	29D, 20R	57D, 41R	Maria Cantwell (D)	Patty Murray (D)	7D, 3R	Biden/ Harris (D) ✓
2022	Jay Inslee (D)	Denny Heck (D)	Steve Hobbs (D)	Bob Ferguson (D)	Mike Pellicciotti (D)	Pat McCarthy (D)	Hilary Franz (D)	Mike Kreidler (D)	Chris Reykdal (NP/D)	29D, 20R	57D, 41R	Maria Cantwell (D)	Patty Murray (D)	7D, 3R	Biden/ Harris (D) ✓
2023	Jay Inslee (D)	Denny Heck (D)	Steve Hobbs (D)	Bob Ferguson (D)	Mike Pellicciotti (D)	Pat McCarthy (D)	Hilary Franz (D)	Mike Kreidler (D)	Chris Reykdal (NP/D)	29D, 20R	58D, 40R	Maria Cantwell (D)	Patty Murray (D)	8D, 2R	Biden/ Harris (D) ✓
2024	Jay Inslee (D)	Denny Heck (D)	Steve Hobbs (D)	Bob Ferguson (D)	Mike Pellicciotti (D)	Pat McCarthy (D)	Hilary Franz (D)	Mike Kreidler (D)	Chris Reykdal (NP/D)	29D, 20R	58D, 40R	Maria Cantwell (D)	Patty Murray (D)	8D, 2R	Harris/ Walz (D) ✗
2025	Bob Ferguson (D)	Denny Heck (D)	Steve Hobbs (D)	Nick Brown (D)	Mike Pellicciotti (D)	Pat McCarthy (D)	Dave Upthegrove (D)	Patty Kuderer (D)	Chris Reykdal (NP/D)	30D, 19R	59D, 39R	Maria Cantwell (D)	Patty Murray (D)	8D, 2R	Harris/ Walz (D) ✗
2026	Bob Ferguson (D)	Denny Heck (D)	Steve Hobbs (D)	Nick Brown (D)	Mike Pellicciotti (D)	Pat McCarthy (D)	Dave Upthegrove (D)	Patty Kuderer (D)	Chris Reykdal (NP/D)	30D, 19R	59D, 39R	Maria Cantwell (D)	Patty Murray (D)	8D, 2R	Harris/ Walz (D) ✗
2027	Bob Ferguson (D)	Denny Heck (D)	Steve Hobbs (D)	Nick Brown (D)	Mike Pellicciotti (D)	Pat McCarthy (D)	Dave Upthegrove (D)	Patty Kuderer (D)	Chris Reykdal (NP/D)	30D, 19R	69D, 29R	Maria Cantwell (D)	Patty Murray (D)	8D, 2R	Harris/ Walz (D) ✗

Key to party colors and abbreviations for members of the U.S. Congress and other politicians or officials
Alaskan Independence (AKIP) Know Nothing (KN) American Labor (AL) Anti-Jacksonian (Anti-J); National Republican (NR) Anti-Administration (AA) Anti-Masonic (Anti-M) Conservative (Con) Covenant (Cov)	Democratic (D) Democratic–Farmer–Labor (DFL) Democratic–NPL (D-NPL) Dixiecrat (Dix), States' Rights (SR) Democratic-Republican (DR) Farmer–Labor (FL) Federalist (F); Pro-Administration (PA)	Free Soil (FS) Fusion (Fus) Greenback (GB) Independence (IPM) Jacksonian (J) Liberal (Lib) Libertarian (L) National Union (NU)	Nonpartisan League (NPL) Nullifier (N) Opposition Northern (O); Opposition Southern (O) Populist (Pop) Progressive (Prog) Prohibition (Proh) Readjuster (Rea)	Republican (R) Silver (Sv) Silver Republican (SvR) Socialist (Soc) Union (U) Unconditional Union (UU) Vermont Progressive (VP) Whig (W)	Independent (I) Nonpartisan (NP)

== See also ==
- Politics in Washington
- Elections in Washington
