= Political party strength in Washington =

Political party strength in Washington may refer to:

- Political party strength in Washington (state)
- Political party strength in Washington, D.C.
