= Senator Biggs (disambiguation) =

Asa Biggs (1811–1878) was a U.S. Senator from North Carolina from 1855 to 1858. Senator Biggs may refer to:

- Andy Biggs (born 1958), Arizona State Senate
- D. E. Biggs (1860–1924), Washington State Senate
- Donald Biggs (1930–2024), Kansas State Senate
- Joshua Biggs (1821–1888), Maryland State Senate
