= J. H. Schively =

American politician

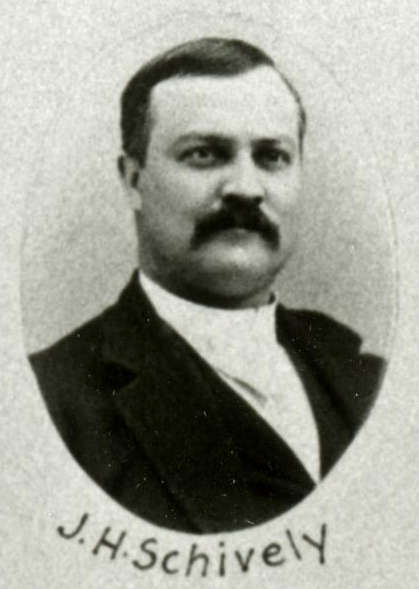
- Schively in 1895

1st Insurance Commissioner of Washington
- In office 1909–1913
- Preceded by: Office created
- Succeeded by: H. O. Fishback

Member of the Washington House of Representatives from the 49th district
- In office 1895–1897 Serving with D. E. Biggs
- Preceded by: Albert Sherman
- Succeeded by: John L. Likins

Personal details
- Born: John Hellings Schively; September 28, 1848 Philadelphia, Pennsylvania, United States
- Died: July 17, 1934 (aged 75) San Francisco, California, United States
- Party: Republican

John Hellings Schively (September 28, 1858 – July 17, 1934) was an American politician in the state of Washington. He served in the Washington House of Representatives from 1895 to 1897, alongside D. E. Biggs and later served as Washington state insurance commissioner

Schively served as chairman of the Washington State Republican Party.

In 1901, newly-elected Washington Secretary of State Sam Nichols appointed Schivley to serve as head of state's Insurance Commission. In 1907, the Washington State Legislature created a new agency headed by an insurance commissioner, which would be an executive branch elected official. Schively became insurance commissioner.

Schively and Nichols faced allegations of misconduct in office, being accused of charging insurance companies fees that were not statutorily authorized. Calls for impeachment arose. On March 11, 1909, an impeachment inquiry was authorized by the Washington House of Representatives in a 76–17 vote. The Washington State Senate's investigatory committee investigated the allegations against the two. On May 4, Nichols resigned as Secretary of State due to the negative press coverage, but still claimed his innocence.

113 days after the inquiry was launched, on June 23, 1909, Governor Marion Hay called the legislature into a special session in order to address the matter of impeachment. On June 25, 1909, he w was impeached in an 88–0 vote which approved an impeachment resolution. Impeachment trial proceedings began on June 30, 1909, when the Washington Senate was presented with 26 articles of impeachment by the impeachment managers appointed by the Washington House of Representatives. On July 10, the state senate received Schiveley's lengthy answer to the charges. Recess was held until August 11, to provide time for Schiveley and his legal counsel to prepare for the trial. The trial resumed August 20, 1909. Schively was represented by lawyer George C. Israel. Israel claimed there was a hidden agenda against Schively, providing an energetic defense for his client. Schively, however, cried through much of the proceedings, and Israel would tell the Olympia Recorder that he regarded Schively as, "the worst witness I ever had," remarking, "He looks like he doesn't seem to be telling the truth when he is telling the truth." After two weeks, on August 26, 1909, the Senate acquitted Schively on all of the 26 articles of impeachment. On the closest article to conviction, the Senate voted 26–14 in favor of finding Schively guilty, but this fell short of the two-thirds majority needed for a conviction. Schively thereafter returned to his role and finished his term in office. Schively's acquittal in his impeachment trial inspired the State Legislature to soon adopt a law allowing the state to hold recall elections. Schiveley lost re-election in 1912.
