= Patrick Henry Winston Jr. =

Lawyer, newspaper editor (1847–1904)

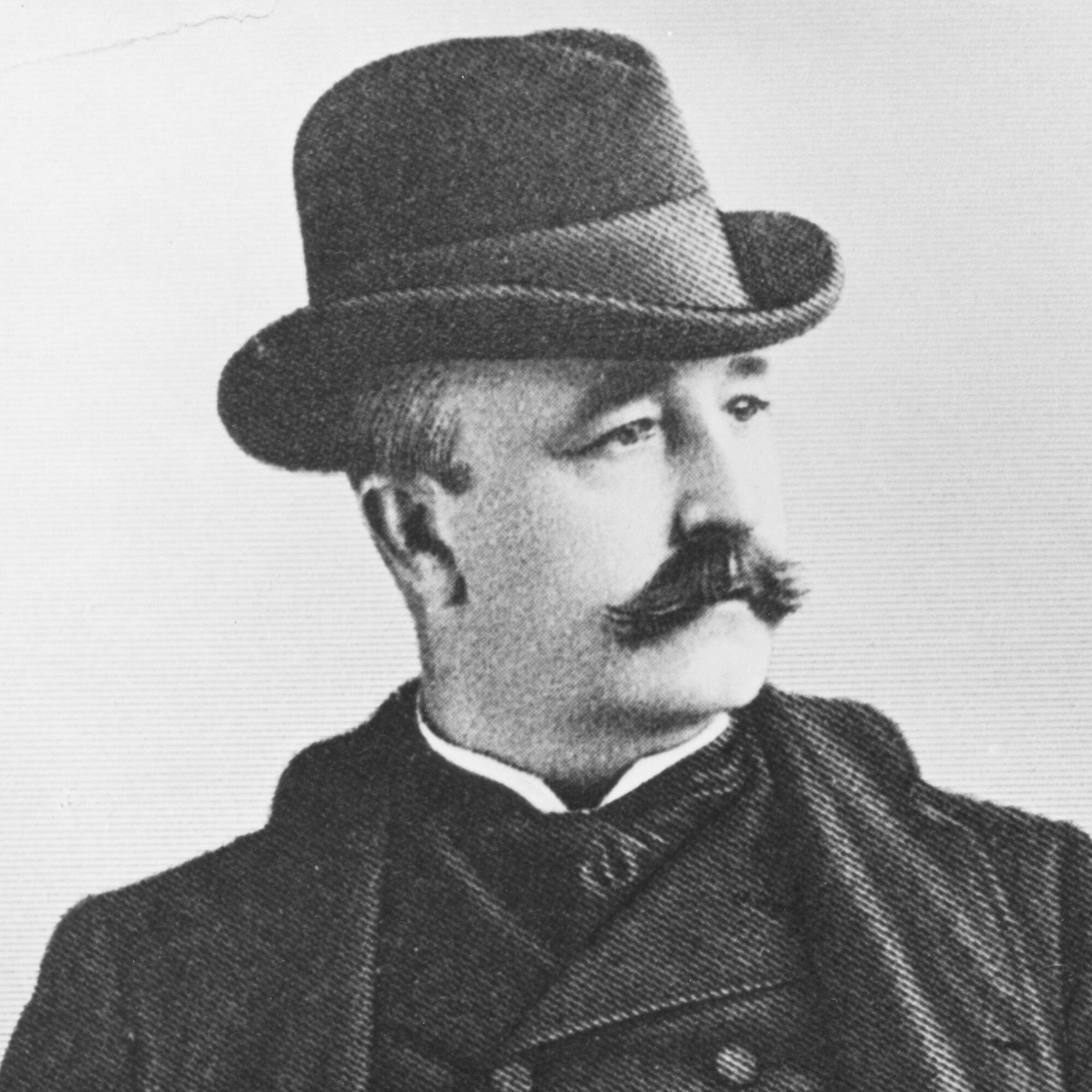
- Winston c. 1897

3rd Attorney General of Washington
- In office 1897–1901
- Governor: John Rankin Rogers
- Preceded by: William C. Jones
- Succeeded by: Wickliffe Stratton

Personal details
- Party: People's Party
- Profession: Lawyer, newspaper editor

Patrick Henry Winston Jr. (August 22, 1847 – April 3, 1904) was a lawyer and newspaper editor who served as Attorney General of Washington from 1897 to 1901. According to one biography, "It is difificult to describe such a man or to give a satisfactory account of his career. His personality always outshone and dazzled his achievement."

Nonetheless, some of his achievements:

- Educated at the Horner School and the University of North Carolina (valedictorian)
- Trustee of the University of North Carolina
- Director of the Albemarle and Chesapeake Canal
- Delegate to two National Democratic and two National Republican conventions
- Presidential elector
- Registrar of the United States General Land Office in Lewiston, Idaho
- District attorney of the Territory of Washington
- First attorney general of the State of Washington by popular election.
- Owner and editor of three newspapers
  - Albemarle Times, Windsor, North Carolina
  - Spokane Review, Spokane, Washington
  - Winston's Weekly, Spokane, Washington

He came from a prominent North Carolina family; one of his brothers, Francis D. Winston, was United States Attorney for the Eastern District of North Carolina.
