= Washington Attorney General =

Chief legal officer of Washington state

Attorney General of Washington
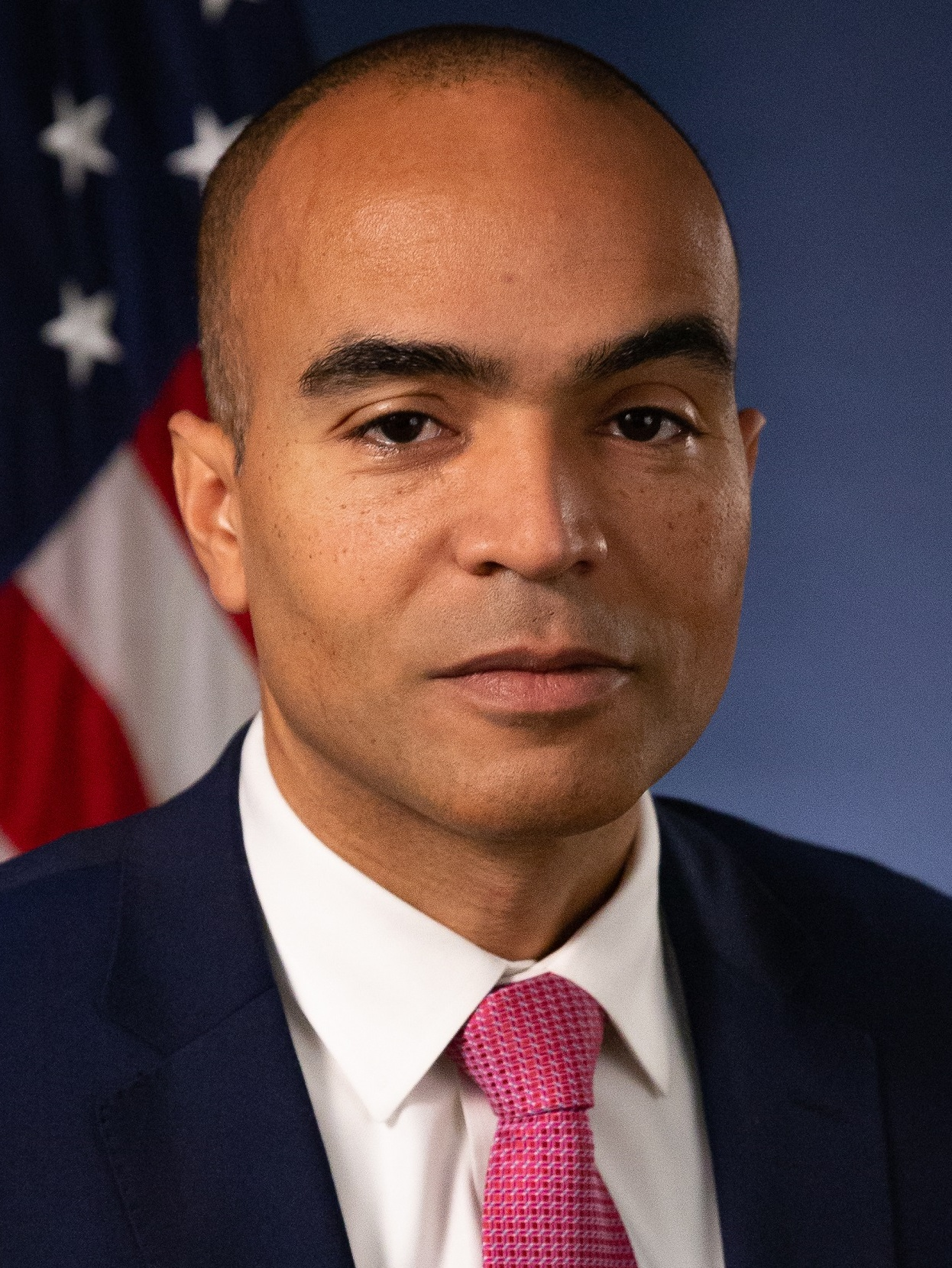
- Incumbent; Nick Brown since January 15, 2025
- Office of the Attorney General
- Style: The Honorable
- Term length: Four years No limit
- Constituting instrument: Washington State Constitution
- Formation: 1887
- Salary: $218,744

The attorney general of Washington is the chief legal officer of the U.S. state of Washington and head of the Washington State Office of the Attorney General. The attorney general represents clients of the state and defends the public interest in accordance to state law. The office of the attorney general is an executive office elected by the citizens of Washington, and the officeholder serves a four-year term.

== Authority ==
The powers and responsibilities of the Washington attorney general derive from the Washington State Constitution (Const. art. III, § 1) and the Revised Code of Washington (RCW 43.10).

== List of attorneys general of Washington ==
The following is a list of individuals who have served as attorney general of the U.S. state of Washington. The attorney general is fifth (behind the lieutenant governor, secretary of state, treasurer, and auditor, respectively) in the line of succession to the office of Governor of Washington.

Denotes acting attorney general or time served as acting attorney general

#	Image	Attorney General	Term of office		Political party
1		James B. Metcalfe	1887	1889	Democratic
2		William C. Jones	1889	1897	Republican
3		Patrick Henry Winston Jr.	1897	1901	People's Party
4		Wickliffe Stratton	1901	1905	Republican
5		John Atkinson	1905	1909	Republican
6		Walter Bell	1909	1911	Republican
7		William V. Tanner	1911	1912	Republican
7		William V. Tanner	1912	1919	Republican
8		L.L. Thompson	1919	1920	Republican
8		L.L. Thompson	1920	1923	Republican
9		John Dunbar	1923	1925	Republican
9		John Dunbar	1925	1933	Republican
10		Garrison Hamilton	1933	1940	Democratic
11		Smith Troy	1941	1944	Democratic
11		Smith Troy	1944	1952	Democratic
12		Don Eastvold	1953	1956	Republican
13		John J. O'Connell	1957	1969	Democratic
14		Slade Gorton	1969	1981	Republican
15		Ken Eikenberry	1981	1993	Republican
16		Christine Gregoire	1993	2005	Democratic
17		Rob McKenna	2005	2013	Republican
18		Bob Ferguson	2013	2025	Democratic
19		Nick Brown	2025	Incumbent	Democratic

== Current attorney general (Nick Brown) ==
Nick Brown is the current attorney general in the state of Washington. He took over the seat in 2025, primarily running on a campaign of safety for Seattle citizens. Secondarily, he ran on access to abortion for Washington residents and mitigation of climate change. He won the 2024 election by defeating republican challenger Pete Serrano, making history as the first African American attorney general of the state of Washington.

During his time as attorney general he has made headlines for suing the Trump administration multiple times, most notably over SNAP benefits. He has also recently pushed for a bill that would protect immigrant workers in the state of Washington.
