= James B. Metcalfe =

1st Attorney General of Washington

James Bard Metcalfe
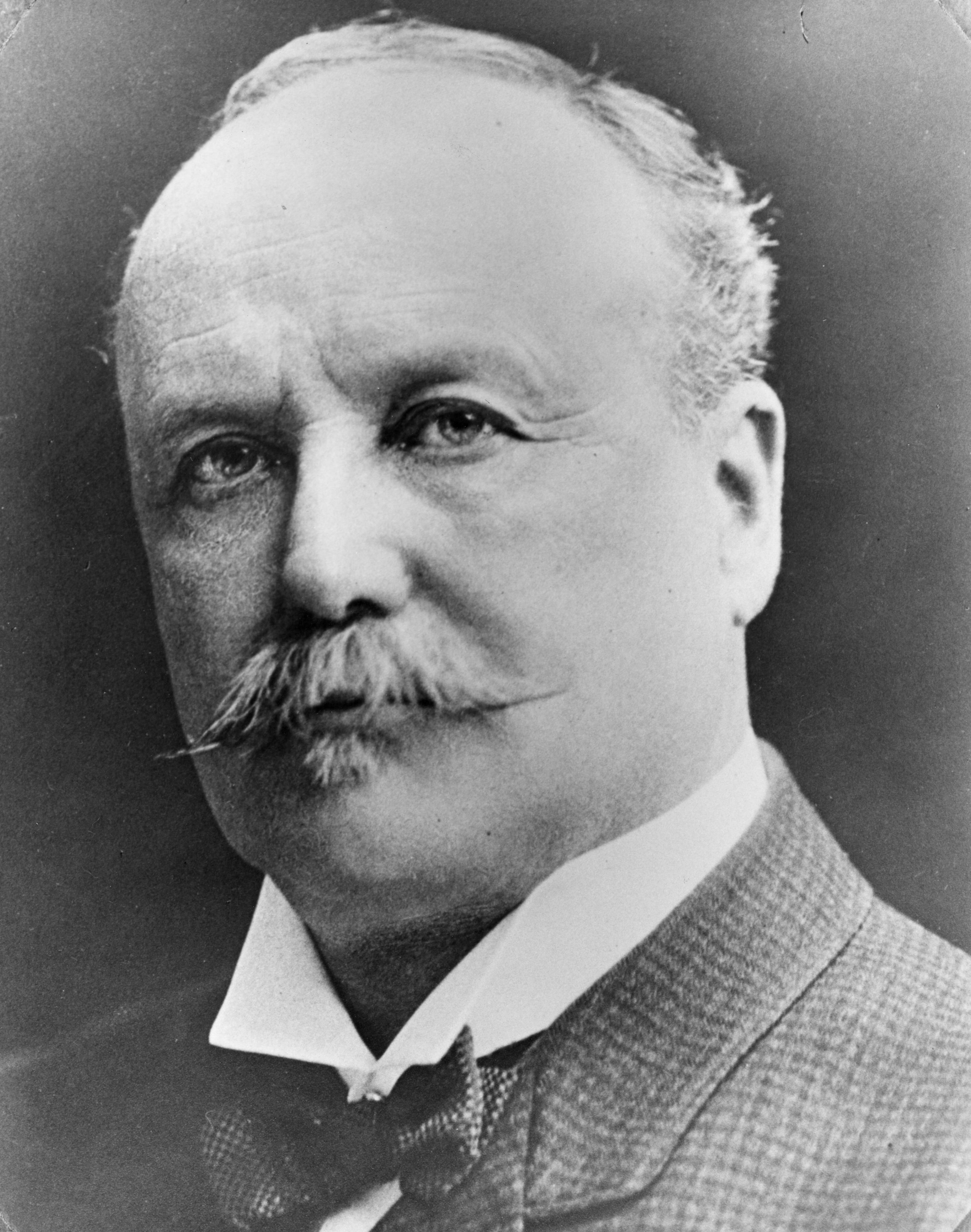
- Metcalfe c. 1888

1st Attorney General of Washington
- In office December 7, 1887 – November 11, 1889
- Governor: Eugene Semple
- Preceded by: Office established
- Succeeded by: William C. Jones

Personal details
- Born: January 15, 1846 Adams County, Mississippi, U.S.
- Died: July 9, 1924 (aged 78) Kitsap County, Washington, U.S.
- Party: Democratic
- Spouse: Louise Boarman
- Children: Tom Metcalfe; Vernon Metcalfe
- Profession: Lawyer, banker

Military service
- Allegiance: Confederate States of America
- Branch/service: Confederate States Army
- Unit: 10th Mississippi Cavalry

James Bard Metcalfe (January 15, 1846 – July 9, 1924) was an American lawyer and politician in Seattle, Washington who served as the first Attorney General of Washington.

== Early life ==
Metcalfe was born in Adams County, Mississippi to parents who were descendants of English and Irish immigrants. As a child he received private tutoring before entering public school. At the outbreak of the American Civil War in 1861, Metcalfe joined the 10th Mississippi Cavalry and served for the Confederate States Army throughout the entire war (including a brief period under Nathan Bedford Forrest). After being paroled in 1865 he worked in Natchez, Mississippi for eight years with a mercantile business and in the banking industry. While working he had been reading law but found few opportunities to work as a lawyer in the area. In 1873 he moved west to San Francisco, California to pursue a legal career in a more promising location.

== Career ==
After arriving in San Francisco, Metcalfe worked for a bank while finishing his legal studies. In 1874 he was admitted to the bar and found work with the firm of Bartlett & Pratt (later Pratt & Metcalfe). Over the next decade he became a well known lawyer in the city and also became active with Democratic politics (including serving as a delegate to the 1880 Democratic National Convention). In January 1883 he visited Seattle, Washington and decided to relocate there, arriving later that year. He continued to enjoy a successful career as a trial lawyer and after several years formed a partnership with Junius Rochester.

In 1887 he was named the first Attorney General of the Washington Territory, serving from 1887 until Washington achieved statehood in 1889. During the Great Seattle Fire in 1899, Metcalfe lost his extensive personal law library. He decided to start a new partnership with Charles W. Turner and Andrew F. Burleigh specializing in business and commercial law. One of his most famous clients was George Carmack whose discovery of gold in the Yukon in 1896 prompted the Klondike Gold Rush.

Metcalfe also continued to remain active with local politics and civic causes. He was involved in the development of Sedro-Woolley, Washington in the late 1880s and early 1890s and also a supporter of the Alaska–Yukon–Pacific Exposition. In 1908 he ran for mayor of Seattle but was defeated by John Franklin Miller.

== Personal life ==
In 1877 he married Louise Boarman of San Francisco. They had two sons, Tom and Vernon.

== Later life and death ==
Metcalf remained active in law and politics into the 1910s before gradually retiring and moving to a country home in Kitsap County, Washington. Metcalfe died there in 1924. His body was buried in the Suquamish Memorial Cemetery at Port Madison Indian Reservation in Kitsap, County.

Legal offices
| Preceded by Nobody | Attorney General of Washington; 1887 – 1889 | Succeeded by William C. Jones |
