= Ithamar Howell =

American politician from Washington (State) (1866-1920)

Ithamar Martindale Howell
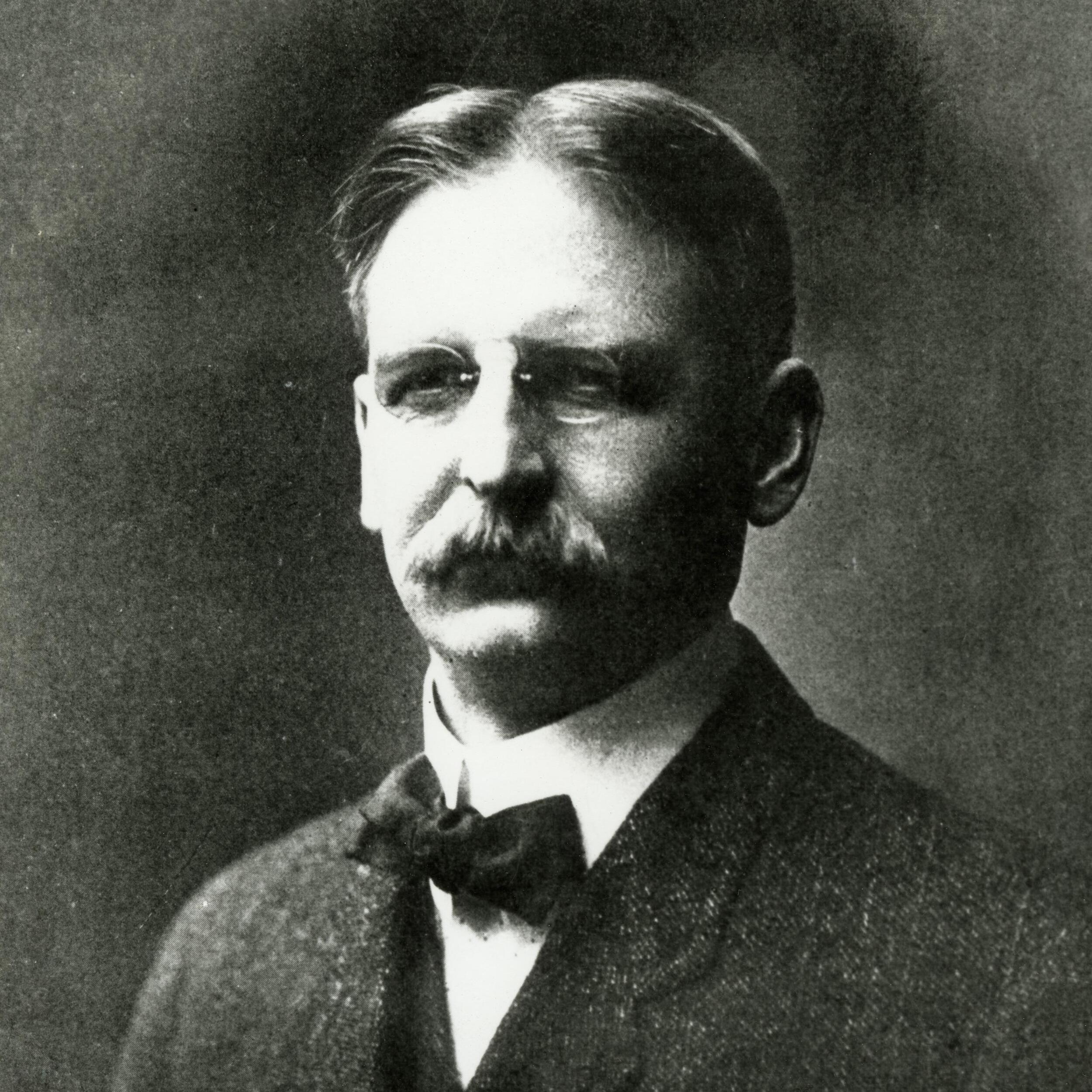
- Howell c. 1909 – c. 1920

5th Secretary of State of Washington
- In office May 1, 1909 – July 13, 1920
- Governor: Marion E. Hay; Ernest Lister; Louis F. Hart
- Preceded by: Sam Nichols
- Succeeded by: Jay Hinkle

Personal details
- Born: February 18, 1866 Waukon, Iowa, U.S.
- Died: July 13, 1920 (aged 54) Olympia, Washington, U.S.
- Party: Republican
- Education: Monmouth College (now Monmouth University) in Oregon

Captain Ithamar Martindale Howell (February 18, 1866 – July 13, 1920) was an American politician who served as the 5th Secretary of State of Washington as a member of the Republican party from May 1, 1909, until his death on July 13, 1920.

== Early life ==
Howell was born in Waukon, Iowa and grew up in Rock Rapids, Iowa. He and his family moved to Tacoma in the Washington Territory in 1877 and he attended Monmouth College in Oregon. He ended up receiving a Bachelor of Arts degree from that college. Howell served in the Washington Territorial and National Guard from 1880 to 1895. In the 1890s, howell became Secretary of the World Printing Company and eventually Secretary and Treasurer of the Peco Free Milling and Mining Company.

== Political career and death ==
Howell was first elected Pierce County Assessor in 1899, before becoming chief deputy in the County Auditor's Office in 1901 and serving as Clerk to the Board of Commissioners. In 1908, Howell entered the Republican primary for the position of Secretary of State of Washington, but lost to incumbent Sam Nichols. But following Nichols' resignation the following year on allegations of corruption, Governor Marion E. Hay appointed Howell as the fifth Secretary of State on May 1, 1909.

Howell was twice re-elected to that position with 34.12% of the vote in 1912 and 53.09% of the vote in 1916. Howell died in office during his second term in Olympia, Washington on July 13, 1920.

== See also ==
- Secretary of State of Washington

Political offices
Preceded by Sam Nichols	Secretary of State of Washington; 1909-1920	Succeeded by Jay Hinkle
