= Sam Nichols =

4th Secretary of State of Washington

Samuel Hopkins Nichols
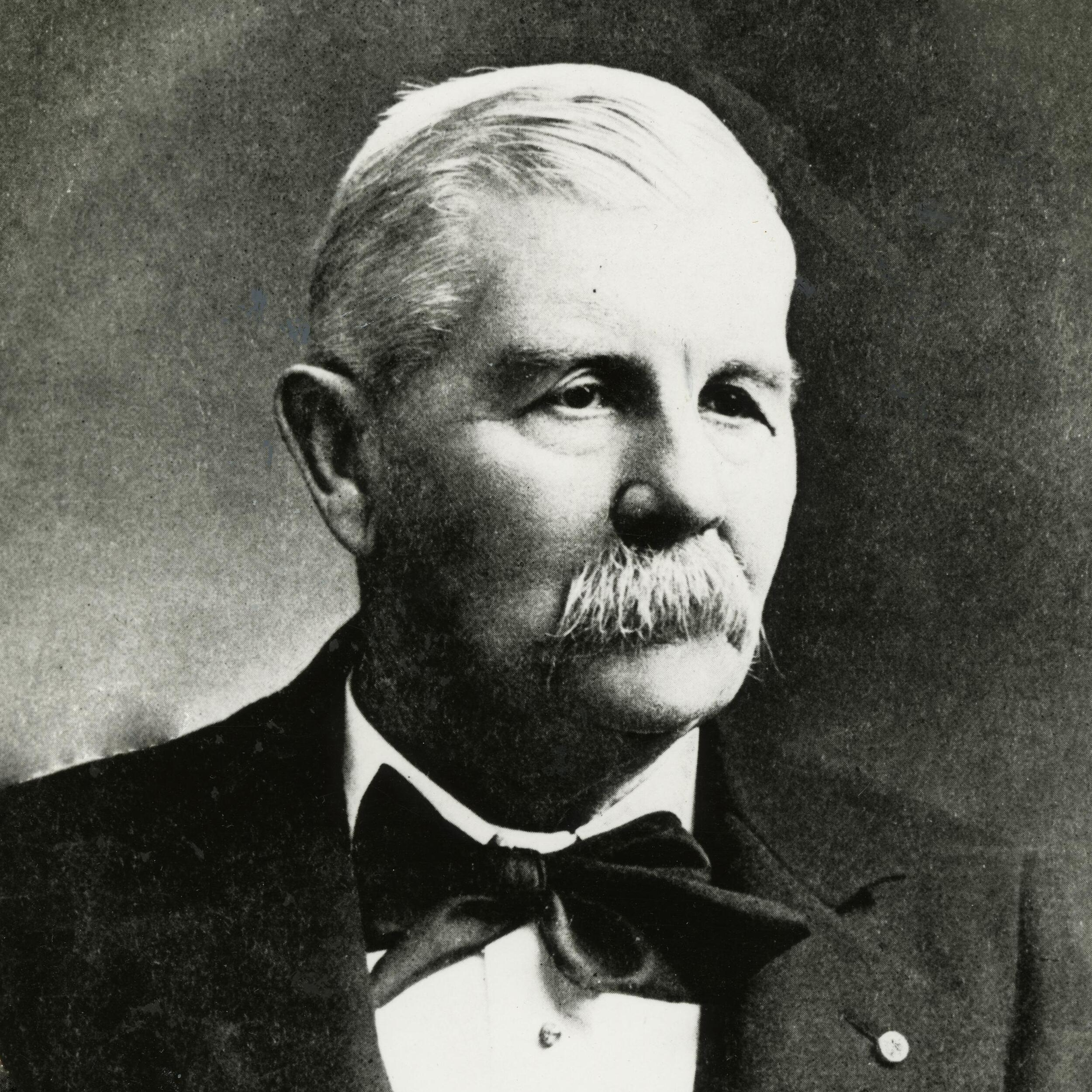
- Nichols c. 1901 – c. 1909

4th Secretary of State of Washington
- In office January 16, 1901 – January 13, 1909
- Governor: John Rankin Rogers; Henry McBride; Albert E. Mead
- Preceded by: Will Jenkins
- Succeeded by: Ithamar Howell

Personal details
- Born: August 7, 1829 (Note: August 7, 1829 is recorded as Nichols' birth date in the Malden Birth Record. During Nichols' life, his age was considered "a proposition of interest" as several authors claimed different years of his birth, including 1835 and 1838. Much later sources also claimed 1830 as the year of his birth. At the time of Nichols' death, a Seattle Post-Intelligencer article claimed that Nichols' relatives confirmed 1829 as his birth year.) Malden, Massachusetts, US
- Died: April 5, 1913 (aged 83) Everett, Washington, US
- Resting place: Evergreen Cemetery, Everett, Washington
- Party: Republican
- Children: 6
- Occupation: President of the Fergus Falls, Minnesota City Council; County Commissioner for Olmsted County, Minnesota; assistant clerk and chief clerk for the Minnesota House of Representatives; clerk of the Minnesota Supreme Court; member of the first City Council of Everett, Washington
- Known for: Politician and civic leader in the states of Minnesota and Washington. Was a member of the City Council in Fergus Falls, Minnesota, member of the first Everett City Council, the 4th Secretary of Washington State as well as clerk and commissioner in different county and state departments.

Samuel Hopkins Nichols (August 7, 1829 – April 5, 1913) was a politician and civic leader in the states of Minnesota and Washington. He was a pioneer of Salem Township and Fergus Falls in Minnesota as well as of Everett, Washington. He was a Clerk in Salem Township and president of the Fergus Falls City Council, served as County Commissioner for Olmsted County, Minnesota, Assistant Clerk and Chief Clerk for the Minnesota House of Representatives, and Clerk of the state Supreme Court. In Everett, Nichols helped incorporate the city's first Chamber of Commerce and was a member of its first City Council. He was elected the fourth Secretary of State of Washington in 1901 and re-elected twice. He served at the position two full terms, but had to resign in the beginning of his third term due to accusations of malfeasance and corruption.

Nichols came to Minnesota in 1855 as a farmer. Later, he filled a number of positions on town and county levels and was pronounced a political leader of the state. He was a pioneer and Clerk of the Salem Township, lived in Saint Paul for a period of time, and later became one of the Fergus Falls pioneers and a president of its City Council in 1874–1875. In 1862 and 1863, Nichols served as County Commissioner; in 1869, he became an Assistant Clerk for the Minnesota House of Representatives, and later served as its Chief Clerk for three terms. He was listed as a clerk in the US land office, and from 1872 to 1876 was District Court Clerk. Later, he was elected Otter Tail County Register of Deeds, although his win was followed by accusations of campaign fraud. In 1875, Nichols became Clerk of the state Supreme Court, and was re-elected twice, in 1878 and 1881. He also briefly engaged in banking and water navigation businesses in Minnesota.

Nichols served in the Minnesota Infantry Regiment during the American Civil War, and played an active role in the suppression of the Dakota people's attacks during the Dakota War of 1862.

Nichols moved to Washington State in 1891 and settled in Everett, becoming one of its pioneers. He took an active part in the city's development by occupying every office in the city. He also engaged in Everett's mining and real estate businesses. In 1892, Nichols assisted in the initiation of the city's first Chamber of Commerce and helped build its first building. After Everett's incorporation as a city in 1893, Nichols became a member of its first City Council. He lived and worked in Everett until he was elected the fourth Secretary of State of Washington for the 1901–1905 term. This position forced him to move to Olympia, where he became not only Secretary of State, but also Acting Governor for Governor McBride. Many saw Nichols as a future governor. He was re-elected as Secretary of State for the 1905–1909 term. Nichols also served as Commissioner for the State Insurance Department and the Bureau of Statistics, Agriculture and Immigration and was a member of the State Board of Equalization.

Nichols was re-elected Secretary of State for a third term, but had to resign soon after his re-election due to accusations of corruption and malfeasance in the Insurance Department and charges pressed against his activity as Insurance Commissioner in 1905–1907. An investigation was carried out against Nichols and his Deputy Insurance Commissioner, J. H. Schively, for drawing money and overcharging state insurance companies for services the department never provided or provided poorly, as well as for not registering their earnings and expenses properly and violating state law on multiple occasions. Though Schively tried to shift the responsibility to Nichols, the latter denied his guilt. Soon after the investigation began, and under promise of immunity from prosecution, Nichols resigned from his official positions. Schively stayed at his position (Insurance Commissioner at the time) and was recommended for impeachment. At an extraordinary Legislature session called by Governor Hay, an impeachment trial for Schively was arranged, but he was eventually acquitted on all charges. He proceeded to work as insurance commissioner until the end of his term.

After Nichols' resignation, he sold his property in Olympia and returned to Everett to live in retirement.

== Early life, family, and education ==
Samuel Nichols was born on August 7, 1829, in Malden, Massachusetts.

Nichols' ancestors on his father's side came from England to settle in Massachusetts in about 1632. His mother's side was an "old American family" whose members took part in the War for Independence (or American Revolutionary War).

Nichols' father, Lemuel Nichols, was also born in Malden, Massachusetts, and his mother, Lucy Lee Fesendon (or Fessenden as recorded in The Malden Marriages Record), was from Lexington, Massachusetts. They married in Malden on October 23, 1828. The parents had two sons, Samuel Hopkins and George Lemuel, the latter born on July 14, 1840; and a daughter, Maria Lucy, born on March 4, 1831. Lemuel was a sea captain for many years until his retirement in 1855.

Nichols was educated at Malden High School and Medford Academy.

In 1855, the family moved from Massachusetts to Minnesota. They settled on a farm in the southern part of the state and worked raising stock.

== Career in Minnesota ==
=== Military service ===
Nichols served in the Minnesota Infantry Regiment during the American Civil War.

In 1862, the armed conflict known as the Dakota War of 1862, a conflict between several bands of the Native American Dakota tribe (named Sioux by the white people) and white Americans began. Many different causes were cited, but the leading one remained a long-term dissatisfaction on the part of the native people about the white Americans' failure to fulfill official agreements in regard to annuity payments (money to improve native settlements). Late payments from the US government resulted in starvation and hardship, pushing the Dakota to plan an attack on the locals and immigrants of southwestern Minnesota in an effort to drive white people to the east of the Mississippi River and eventually out of Minnesota. After several months of the intense battles, Native Americans surrendered. Over 300 were found guilty of massacres and rape and sentenced to death, but due to President Lincoln's pardon, only 38 of them were eventually hanged. All agreements between the US government and native tribes were annulled and the tribes exiled from Minnesota.

At the time of the conflict, Governor Ramsey appointed Nichols Captain of a militia company. Nichols took active part in battles aimed at the suppression of the Dakota attacks. According to a Seattle Post-Intelligencer article, during that conflict Nichols served as a volunteer officer.

=== Political and civic activity ===
After his service in the Dakota War, Nichols worked at the office of the provost marshal in Rochester, Minnesota.

From time he was of voting age, Nichols was "a very active Republican." In articles published after his death, Nichols was referred to as "a Republican leader in Minnesota," as during his time in that state he held a number of town and county positions.

Not long after the Salem Township (previously known as Lexington) was established in 1858, Nichols became one of its first settlers and was elected town Clerk. In 1862 and 1863, Nichols served as County Commissioner for Olmstead County. From Salem, Nichols moved to Saint Paul, and in 1869 became Assistant Clerk for the Minnesota House of Representatives. Two years later, he was listed as a clerk in the US land office in Alexandria.

Around 1871, Nichols moved to Fergus Falls, becoming one of its pioneers and an active participant in the events that made the town known as "political center." He was present when the town became the county seat (instead of Otter Tail City) in 1872. Nichols' first engagement was a banking business with George Head, Chief Clerk of the Minnesota House of Representatives, from 1872 to1876. They choose the location for their future bank and delivered lumber for the building, but didn't proceed with the construction, and the business was soon defunct. Later, at the site of their failed bank, the Fergus Falls National Bank was built.

In 1872, Nichols was elected Clerk of District Court, serving until 1876. Two years later, he was nominated for the position of Otter Tail County Register of Deeds. At the time, there were two blocs of the local Republican party, and the "Austin faction" wanted Nichols to run against the opposing group's (the "Wright faction") candidate, Charles Norgaard. This split within the Republican party was called "the germ which in late years developed into the Bull Moose party." Since two Republicans couldn't run against each other, Nichols was nominated as an Independent candidate.

During his electoral campaign, Nichols was supported by a farm machine dealer, Springen (for whom Springen Avenue in Fergus Falls was named). Springen was supposed to vote for Nichols and induce other people in the town of Aastad to do so, but eventually it became clear that Springen didn't vote or advocate for Nichols at all. Nevertheless, Nichols won the 1874 election by a close majority and served as County Register of Deeds until 1876. His win was followed by a controversy, as Norgaard's supporters claimed that the election was "fraudulently done."

By 1873, the Northern Pacific Railroad went through Otter Tail County and crossed the Red River about 60 miles (97 km) northeast of Fergus Falls. As the railroad didn't reach the city, the settlers of Fergus Falls decided to create competition for the railroad by establishing a water route—a system of locks and dams—between Northern Pacific Railroad and Fergus Falls, with cheaper rates than the railroad. In June 1873, the Red River Slack Water Navigation Company was established with Nichols as one of its incorporators.

In 1874 and 1875, Nichols served as president of the Fergus Falls Council (officially named the "Village Council of the Village of Fergus Falls"). In 1875, he became a Clerk of the Minnesota Supreme Court. He served for 11 years, being re-elected in 1878 and 1881. In 1886, he was nominated for a third re-election, but as Moses E. Clapp was nominated to run for Attorney General also on the Otter Tail County Republican ticket, Nichols was forced to give way for a candidate from another county and his re-election failed.

Nichols briefly served as state oil inspector in Minnesota, and was Chief Clerk of the Minnesota House of Representatives for three terms.

Though Nichols was registered as a Saint Paul citizen, he always called Fergus Falls his home, and ran for his official positions on the Otter Tail County ticket.

== Career in Washington State ==
=== Activity in Everett ===
Nichols came to Washington State in 1891, settling in Everett. He is credited for being one of the first people to shape the city, and was an active developer of its infrastructure, as over time, he filled every city office. He was engaged in real estate dealings. In 1906, Nichols was an owner of the Snohomish County Coffin & Mallet mines, which were rich in lead, gold, and silver.

In 1892, Nichols helped initiate the city's first Chamber of Commerce, and helped raise its first building. After the incorporation of Everett as a city in 1893, Nichols was elected one of the city's first councilmen. In 1892, he was nominated for the Washington State Senate on the Republican ticket, but lost the election to a Democratic candidate.

In 1896, he was chairman of the Republican County Central Committee. At the time of his death, a Seattle Post-Intelligencer article reported that he served as chairman in the Republican State Central Committee for one year.

=== Olympia politics ===
Nominated for Secretary of State of Washington on the Republican ticket in 1899, Nichols ran a "strong campaign," according to Prosser (co-founder of the Washington State Historical Society), and was elected as the fourth Secretary of State. He served under Governor Rogers, and, after his death, Governor McBride. Nichols' official term was from 1901 to 1905. During his term, Nichols' business address was registered as Olympia, Washington, as he moved there with his wife.

In 1904, Nichols was re-elected Secretary of Washington State for a four-year term from 1905 to 1909.

While Secretary of State, Nichols also served as Vice-governor for Governor McBride during the 1901–1904 term. In 1904, as Acting Governor of Washington State, Nichols travelled to Seattle to attend the USS Nebraska ship launch. In fact, during Nichols' political career in Washington, many people predicted his candidacy for future governor.

Beside his duties with the Secretary of State office, Nichols served in a number of other offices as Commissioner. In 1901, the Legislature created an Insurance Division within the Secretary of State office, and Nichols became State Insurance Commissioner; he served until 1908. From 1903 to 1905, Nichols was Commissioner of the Bureau of Statistics, Agriculture and Immigration and in 1905, a member of the State Board of Equalization. He worked as Commissioner of the Bureau of Statistics through 1907.

After serving two full terms, in 1909 Nichols ran for re-election for Secretary of State. This was one of the first elections using the new direct primary election procedure passed by the Legislature in 1907. Nichols was re-elected, but soon after the election, was charged with malfeasance and corruption, and he resigned.

=== Investigation and retirement ===
==== Preconditions ====
In 1907, the Insurance Department separated from the Secretary of State's office, becoming an independent division, and in 1908, J. H. Schively—previously Nichols' Deputy Insurance Commissioner—became Insurance Commissioner. Around this time, rumors started to grow about certain "irregularities" in the division's past activity that involved both Nichols and Schively. At the time, John L. Wilson (Republican politician and Seattle Post-Intelligencer publisher) used his newspaper to support the Republican party. Wilson wanted to save Republican party from controversy, so when the rumors reached him during the 1908 electoral campaign, he didn't publish any detail. However, as soon as the 1908 election was over, the Post-Intelligencer started to "stir the air with strong suggestions that the state insurance administration needed a going-over" and by the Legislature session of 1909 rumors had turned into official accusations.

At the time of Nichols' death, The Seattle Republican claimed that Nichols was a "political protégé" of John L. Wilson's faction of the Republican party, and suggested that by the time Nichols was re-elected Secretary of State for the third time in 1908, Wilson's faction was no longer supporting him and decided to uncover some of his corrupt schemes.

==== Official charges ====
Official allegations of corruption were made against the State Insurance Department heads at the Legislature's session of 1909. Charges of corrupt activity were pressed against Nichols, as the head of the department in 1905–1907, and against J. H. Schively, who was Deputy Insurance Commissioner in 1905–1907 and was elected Insurance Commissioner in 1908.

Washington State Senator W. H. Paulhamus insisted on the investigation of the Insurance Department and its officials and presented the resolution that contained all the charges against Nichols and Schively. The officials were accused of overcharging multiple insurance companies working or applying to work in Washington State, and putting companies under the impression that the money was collected to cover company examinations. Further, it was stated that the examinations were performed poorly or were never performed at all. The report claimed that the amounts of the money charged were mostly arbitrary and often not documented properly: Nichols and Schively didn't register any such earnings or present any official receipts for collecting the monies, nor did they register their travelling and other expenses. Furthermore, Nichols and Schively were accused of misusing the collected money—several thousand dollars—for their own purposes.

According to the published details, the majority of transactions, agreements, or extortions were made by Schively in person, while Nichols was accused mainly of being in charge of the corrupt office and schemes, as well as of being one of the beneficiaries of the money. The official charge for both of them was "malfeasance in office."

==== Investigation lobbying ====
W. H. Paulhamus' resolution demanded the establishment of a Joint Committee to investigate Nichols and Schively's activity during their 1905–1907 term. It also lobbied to allow the Joint Committee to investigate any state official and any elected or appointed government office. The resolution's contents, especially the Joint Committee credentials, met heated discussions in the Senate. At first, the Senate failed to pass the resolution, voting 21–21. At the last moment, Paulhamus changed his voted against his own resolution in order to postpone the vote to the next day. He tried to convince Senator Booth to vote in favor of the resolution; however, Booth, like a number of other senators, opposed a specific section of the resolution, that allowed all government departments to be investigated. After many discussions, an agreement was made between Paulhamus and Booth: Paulhamus promised to vote for deleting the unwanted section of the resolution, and in return, Booth would vote in favor of the resolution itself.

Eventually, the resolution passed. On March 11, 1909, it was officially adopted by the State Legislature, and the investigating committee was established. The committee convened on April 14, 1909, and notified Insurance Commissioner Schively the investigation has begun.

Nichols claimed that his record was "as pure as the day was bright." Schively declined to comment on the charges, but emphasized that all of the accusations against him concerned his service under Nichols' management, adding, "Mr. Nichols is the proper person to answer your questions." Schively kept on pointing out that he was just an employee under Nichols, but was later confirmed as "not merely an employee" by the House of Representatives.

==== Nichols' resignation ====
The active phase of the investigation lasted until May 10, 1909, and Schively and Nichols were interrogated several times. While Schively claimed he was innocent and voiced his certainty that he would soon be acquitted, during his interrogations he kept emphasizing that all of the activity he was accused of was directed by Nichols, and that Nichols took half of money collected during the scheme.

Nichols didn't comment on Schively's accusations, claiming he would do so only on the trial stand. Nichols was "briefly" interrogated by the investigation committee concerning his activity as Insurance Commissioner. He made statements that could have been seen as perjury, although later it was stated that he had a "failing memory" and didn't personally know things he was interrogated about, so he testified "to the best of his recollection" and "upon second hand information."

Promised immunity from prosecution and taking the advice of friends, Nichols announced his resignation on May 3, 1909, and voiced plans to retire in Everett. Nichols still claimed he was innocent, and that his resignation was a result of old age and an unwillingness to keep fighting for the truth.

Governor Hay appointed Captain Ithomar M. Howell, previously Nichols' leading opponent in the Secretary of State election, as his successor. After Nichols' resignation, the committee halted the investigation against him and focused their attention on Schively's activity.

==== Investigation outcome ====
Unlike Nichols, Schively claimed he had no intentions of resigning, although one article stated that he was "willing and anxious to follow the example of Secretary of State Nichols," but couldn't do it due to lack of finances. As the investigation proceeded, Schively still tried to avoid personal responsibility for the charges and continued stating that Nichols orchestrated the whole thing.

The investigating committee report was presented to a joint Legislative assembly by Governor Hay in June. It confirmed the charges presented earlier in the resolution and provided all testimonies and evidence that Nichols and Schively acted against the law of Washington State while serving as Insurance Commissioner and Deputy Insurance Commissioner during the 1905–1907 term. It was stated that around $5,000 ($133,000 in 2020 dollars (Note: The approximate value converted to 2020 dollars, based on a standard adjustment of the 1913 dollar value using the Consumer Price Index as calculated by United States Department of Labor.)) was inappropriately collected from insurance companies, that the sum was not properly registered and was not used on examinations of the companies as promised, but instead, according to Schively's testimony, was divided equally between the two and spent on personal matters. It also confirmed that the officials overcharged their clients and in some cases used extortion to get arbitrary sums from them. As the investigation against Nichols was dropped after his resignation, the committee made the conclusion of the report exclusively about Schively, specifically calling him "a corrupt and unworthy public official."

Governor Hay convened an extraordinary Legislature session to discuss further actions of either Schivley's impeachment or of the disembodiment of the whole Insurance Department. The House of Representatives voted unanimously (96–0) for Schivley's impeachment. Schively argued his charges in a 60-page letter to the Board of Managers of the House of Representatives, but the Board stuck to the primary verdict.

On July 1, Schively's impeachment trial started. It included 26 separate charges and, despite the fact that Schively himself admitted some charges were true, he was acquitted of all of them. Schively worked as Insurance Commissioner until the end of his term, but he was never nominated for official position again and his political activity quickly diminished. Nevertheless, he was still considered one of the best specialists in insurance, and in 1913 he was still engaged in this field.

A year later, Nichols' resignation was called "the only accomplishment of the special committee."

== Personal life and death ==
During his life, Nichols was widely known by and often referred to as Sam.

In 1862, Nichols married Elizabeth S. Hurd, born in New Hampshire. She was an active member of the Episcopal church. They had six children: William A., who worked as his father's chief clerk and died of typhoid fever in 1891; Augustus S., who became a businessman in Everett; Edna M.; Lizzie; Mary E., who also died before both of her parents; and Ethel L. Nichols and his family were highly esteemed by citizens of the city.

After Nichols announced his resignation and retirement, he decided to leave Olympia and return to Everett, and build a home there. He put his house in Olympia for sale at $4,000 ($106,000 in 2020 dollars).

Nichols had supported the Republican party since the first time he was able to vote; he cast his first vote for President Abraham Lincoln. He was a member of the Masonic fraternity and the Benevolent and Protective Order of Elks. Residing in Olympia, he also joined the Washington State Historical Society in 1901.

Nichols died on April 5, 1913, in Everett, Washington after a prolonged illness due to old age. His wife Elizabeth, son Augustus S., and three daughters, Edna M., Lizzie, and Ethel L., outlived him. He was buried in Evergreen Cemetery.

== See also ==
- J. H. Schively
- John L. Wilson
- W. H. Paulhamus
- Marion E. Hay
- Henry McBride (politician)
- Dakota War of 1862

== Literature cited ==
- "CPI Inflation Calculator", Bureau of Labor Statistics, Washington: United States Department of Labor
- "Washington's Secretaries of State - Past and Present", sos.wa.gov, Olympia: Washington Secretary of State, archived from the original on November 28, 2018
- History of Steele and Waseca counties, Minnesota: an album of history and biography, embracing sketches of the villages, cities, and townships: educational, civil, military, and political history: portraits of prominent citizens, and biographies of old settlers and representative men (PDF), Chicago: Union Publishing Company, 1887, LCCN 01006651, OCLC 7398531
- An Illustrated history of Whitman County, State of Washington, Spokane: W. H. Lever, 1901, OCLC 18517122
- Sketches of Washingtonians: Containing Brief Histories of Men of the State of Washington Engaged in Professional and Political Life, in Manufacture, Commerce, Finance and Religion; with a Summary of the Cities of the State Containing Upwards of 5,000 Population (PDF), Seattle: Wellington C. Wolfe & Co, 1907, ISBN 9780217994071, LCCN 07003167, OCLC 935118482
- "Specific charges against Schively read in senate", Seattle Post-Intelligencer, Seattle: Leigh S. J. Hunt, pp. 1, 2, March 9, 1909, ISSN 2379-7304, LCCN sn83045604, OCLC 9563195
- "Record as pure as day is bright", Spokane Chronicle, Spokane: Cowles Company, p. 20, March 12, 1909, LCCN sn86072020, OCLC 14374699
- "Schively starts for Spokane with officer", Seattle Post-Intelligencer, Seattle: Leigh S. J. Hunt, p. 1, April 24, 1909, ISSN 2379-7304, LCCN sn83045604, OCLC 9563195
- "Sam H. Nichols will resign", The Yakima Herald, North Yakima: Reed & Coe, p. 6, May 5, 1909, ISSN 2158-4745, LCCN sn88085523, OCLC 17416264
- "Nichols to resign", San Juan Islander, Friday Harbor: Culver Bros., p. 2, May 7, 1909, LCCN sn88085190, OCLC 42342745
- "Sam H. Nichols an author now", Spokane Chronicle, Spokane: Cowles Company, p. 16, May 8, 1909, LCCN sn86072020, OCLC 14374699
- "Shively will try to shift responsibility", San Juan Islander, Friday Harbor: Culver Bros., p. 2, May 21, 1909, LCCN sn88085190, OCLC 42342745
- "Schively corrupt, says the сommittee", Seattle Post-Intelligencer, vol. LVI, no. 40, Seattle: Leigh S. J. Hunt, pp. 1, 9, June 24, 1909, ISSN 2379-7304, LCCN sn83045604, OCLC 9563195
- "Ready to prove Schively guilty", The Spokesman-Review, Spokane: Cowles Company, p. 1, July 13, 1909, ISSN 1064-7317, LCCN sn84024754, OCLC 11102610
- "Too much drink is submitted as Schively excuse", Seattle Post-Intelligencer, Seattle: Leigh S. J. Hunt, pp. 1, 2, August 21, 1909, ISSN 2379-7304, LCCN sn83045604, OCLC 9563195
- Revels Cayton, Susie, ed. (August 27, 1909), "John H. Scively not impeached", Seattle Republican, Seattle: Republican Pub. Co., p. 1, ISSN 2157-3271, LCCN sn84025811, OCLC 10328970
- Blethen, Alden J., ed. (April 17, 1910), "Probe of state offices costs snug fortune", Seattle Daily Times, Seattle: The Seattle Times Company, pp. 1, 4, ISSN 2639-4898, LCCN sn86072007, OCLC 1765328
- Blethen, Alden J., ed. (June 1, 1910), "Hay lines up with Wilson supporters", Seattle Daily Times, Seattle: The Seattle Times Company, p. 13, ISSN 2639-4898, LCCN sn86072007, OCLC 1765328
- "Appointed to office", Spokane Chronicle, Spokane: Cowles Company, p. 9, January 25, 1912, LCCN sn86072020, OCLC 14374699
- Blethen, Alden J., ed. (April 5, 1913), "Ex-secretary of state Sam H. Nichols dies", Seattle Daily Times, Seattle: The Seattle Times Company, p. 9, ISSN 2639-4898, LCCN sn86072007, OCLC 1765328
- "S. H. Nichols dies in Everett home", Seattle Post-Intelligencer, Seattle: Leigh S. J. Hunt, p. 21, April 6, 1913, ISSN 2379-7304, LCCN sn83045604, OCLC 9563195
- Revels Cayton, Susie, ed. (April 11, 1913), "Persons in the public eye", Seattle Republican, Seattle: Republican Pub. Co., p. 2, ISSN 2157-3271, LCCN sn84025811, OCLC 10328970
- "Sam H. Nichols dead", San Juan Islander, Friday Harbor: Culver Bros., p. 1, April 11, 1913, LCCN sn88085190, OCLC 42342745
- "Aged politician dies", Duchesne Record, Duchesne: Duchesne Publishing Company, p. 2, April 18, 1913, OCLC 12358458
- Blethen, Alden J., ed. (June 13, 1913), "John H. Schively gets job with Seattle firm", Seattle Daily Times, Seattle: The Seattle Times Company, p. 19, ISSN 2639-4898, LCCN sn86072007, OCLC 1765328
- Mason, John W., ed. (1916), History of Otter Tail County, Minnesota: its people, industries, and institutions: with biographical sketches of representative citizens and genealogical records of many of the old families (PDF), Indianapolis: B. F. Bowen, LCCN 57052403, OCLC 4799831
- "Evergreen Cemetery Guide", epls.org, Everett: Everett Public Library, January 1, 2009
- Bagley, Clarence B. (1916), History of Seattle: From the Earliest Settlement to the Present Time, Chicago: S. J. Clarke Publishing Company, LCCN 16011408, OCLC 7372062
- Bonney, William Pierce (1927), Hanford, Cornelius (ed.), History of Pierce County, Chicago: Pioneer Historical Publishing Company, LCCN 95109999, OCLC 10442109
- Brazier, Don (2000), History of the Washington Legislature, 1854-1963, Olympia: Washington State Senate, LCCN 00329677, OCLC 45163476
- Corey, Deloraine P. (1903), Births, marriages and deaths in the town of Malden, Massachusetts, 1649-1850 (PDF), Cambridge: Cambridge University Press, LCCN 03023027, OCLC 2698561
- Fuller, Edward N. (January 1, 1901), Fuller, Edward N. (ed.), "Secretary's Office", Washington Historian, vol. II, no. 2, Tacoma: Washington State Historical Society, pp. 100–103, LCCN 05000235, OCLC 11580302
- Hume, Harry (1906), Prosperous Washington: a series of articles descriptive of the Evergreen State, its magnificent resources, and its present and probable development, Seattle: The Seattle Post-intelligencer, LCCN 07006883, OCLC 18263388
- Hunt, Herbert; Kaylor, Floyd C. (1917), Washington, west of the Cascades; historical and descriptive; the explorers, the Indians, the pioneers, the modern, Chicago: S. J. Clarke Publishing Company, LCCN 18015511, OCLC 10086413
- Leonard, Joseph Alexander (1910), History of Olmsted County, Minnesota: Together with sketches of many of its pioneers, citizens, families and institutions (PDF), Chicago: Goodspeed Historical Association, LCCN 57052782, OCLC 21023016
- McRae, John (October 1, 1907), Wilhelm, Honor L. (ed.), "History of the Building of Everett", The Coast, vol. XIV, no. 4, Seattle: The Coast Publishing Company, pp. 220–223, LCCN 05032197, OCLC 890484899
- Nichols, Sam H.; Frater, A. W. (1903), Agricultural, manufacturing and commercial resources and capabilities of Washington (PDF), Olympia: Gwin Hicks, OCLC 15223745
- Nichols, Sam H.; Allen, Geo. M. (1905), A review of the resources and industries of Washington, Olympia: C. W. Gorham, OCLC 29720963
- Nichols, Sam H.; Allen, Geo. M. (1907), A review of the resources and industries of Washington, Olympia: C. W. Gorham, OCLC 5274735
- Prosser, William Farrand (1903), Lewis, Edward Gardner (ed.), A history of the Puget Sound country, its resources, its commerce and its people, New York City: Edward Gardner Lewis, LCCN 05013767
- Shaver, Frederic Ambrose; Steele, Richard F.; Rose, Arthur P. (1906), An Illustrated History of southeastern Washington, including Walla Walla, Columbia, Garfield and Asotin counties, Washington (PDF), Spokane: Western Historical Publishing Company, LCCN 06016711, OCLC 8653519
- Shiach, William Sidney; Averill, Harrison B. (1904), An Illustrated History of Klickitat, Yakima and Kittitas counties (PDF), Chicago: Interstate publishing company, LCCN 04037127, OCLC 2097023
- Shiach, William Sidney; Averill, Harrison B. (1906), An Illustrated History of Skagit and Snohomish Counties: their people, their commerce and their resources, with an outline of the early history of the state of Washington (PDF), Chicago: Interstate Publishing Company, LCCN 06030900, OCLC 11299996
- Smalley, Eugene Virgil (1896), A history of the Republican party from its organization to the present time; to which is added a political history of Minnesota from a Republican point of view and biographical sketches of leading Minnesota Republicans, Saint Paul: Eugene Virgil Smalley, OCLC 6030690
- Wood, James A. (April 4, 1943a), "He put over direct primary but it didn't put him over", Seattle Daily Times, Seattle: The Seattle Times Company, p. 15, ISSN 2639-4898, LCCN sn86072007, OCLC 1765328
- Wood, James A. (April 18, 1943b), "John L. kept iron in fire but got only a near-miss", Seattle Daily Times, Seattle: The Seattle Times Company, p. 16, ISSN 2639-4898, LCCN sn86072007, OCLC 1765328
- Wood, James A. (April 25, 1943c), "People learned to mistrust John L.'s editorial motives", Seattle Daily Times, Seattle: The Seattle Times Company, p. 16, ISSN 2639-4898, LCCN sn86072007, OCLC 1765328
