= Wickliffe Stratton =

4th Attorney General of Washington

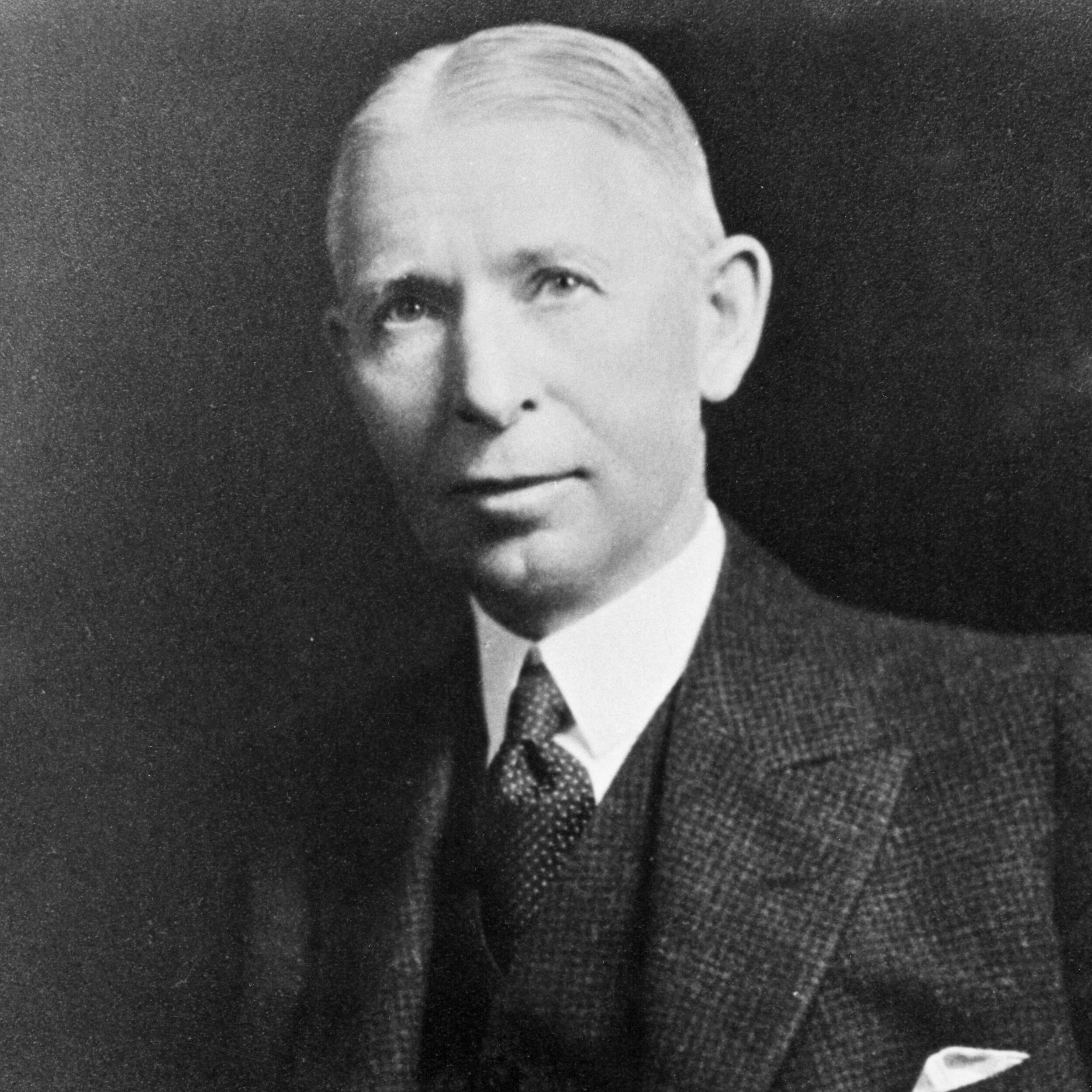
- Stratton c. 1901

4th Attorney General of Washington
- In office January 16, 1901 – January 11, 1905
- Governor: John Rankin Rogers; Henry McBride
- Preceded by: Patrick Henry Winston Jr.
- Succeeded by: John Atkinson

Personal details
- Born: 1869
- Died: 1936 (aged 66–67)
- Party: Republican

Wickliffe Stratton (1869–1936) was the fourth Attorney General of Washington from 1901 to 1905. He was a Republican and originally from Wisconsin state. Elected at the age of 30 to be the Attorney General, he had previously served as the South Bend City Attorney and Pacific County Prosecutor. While only in office for a single term his concerns were to preserve and promote the state's power to collect taxes.

Stratton took several of the towns of Washington to court to make sure they collected taxes on liquor sold and reported it to the state. He also successfully challenged the Northern Pacific Railroad and was able to establish that it was not exempt from paying taxes on the land in Washington state.

Legal offices
Preceded by Patrick Henry Winston	Attorney General of Washington; 1901–1905	Succeeded by John Atkinson
