= William Carey Jones =

American politician

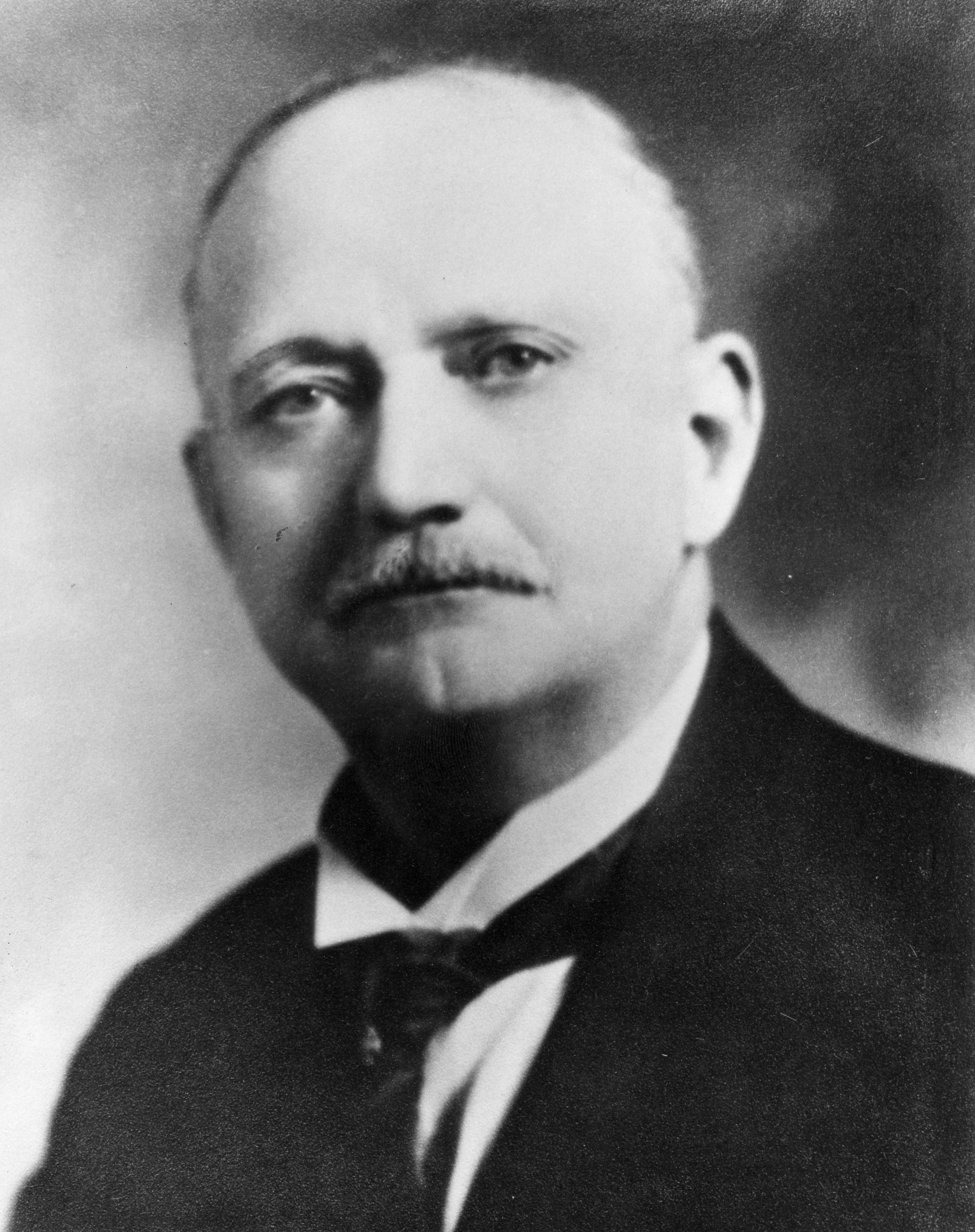
- Jones c. 1889

2nd Attorney General of Washington
- In office 1889 – 1897
- Governor: Elisha P. Ferry; John McGraw
- Preceded by: James B. Metcalfe
- Succeeded by: Patrick Henry Winston Jr.

Personal details
- Born: April 5, 1855 Remsen, New York
- Died: June 14, 1927 (aged 72) Spokane, Washington
- Party: Republican

William Carey Jones (April 5, 1855 – June 14, 1927) was a U.S. representative from Washington.

== Biography ==
Born in Remsen, New York, Jones attended the public schools, the West Salem (Wisconsin) Seminary, and was graduated from the law department of the University of Wisconsin–Madison in 1876. He was admitted to the bar the same year and practiced in Madelia, Minnesota, until 1883. City attorney of Madelia in 1882 and 1883. He moved to the Territory of Washington in 1883 and settled in Cheney. City attorney of Cheney 1884–1889. He moved to Spokane, Washington, in 1887. He served as prosecuting attorney for the twelfth district of the Territory of Washington 1886–1889. Upon the admission of Washington into the Union Jones was elected attorney general of the State and served from 1889 to 1897. He served as delegate to every Territorial and State Republican convention from 1884 to 1894. He served as chairman of the State central committee of the Free Coinage Republican Party in 1896.

Jones was elected as a Silver Republican to the Fifty-fifth Congress (March 4, 1897 – March 3, 1899). He was an unsuccessful candidate for reelection in 1898 to the Fifty-sixth Congress. He was then affiliated with the Democratic Party. He served as delegate to all Democratic State conventions from 1904 to 1924. He resumed the practice of his profession. Jones died in Spokane, Washington, June 14, 1927, his remains were cremated and the ashes scattered over Liberty Lake, near Spokane, Washington.

== Sources ==
- United States Congress. "William Carey Jones (id: J000260)". Biographical Directory of the United States Congress.

Legal offices
Preceded by James B. Metcalf	Attorney General of Washington; 1889–1897	Succeeded by Patrick Henry Winston
U.S. House of Representatives
Preceded by Samuel C. Hyde	Member of the U.S. House of Representatives from Washington's at-large congressional district 1897–1899	Succeeded by Wesley L. Jones
