= Secretary of State of Washington =

Elected constitutional office in Washington

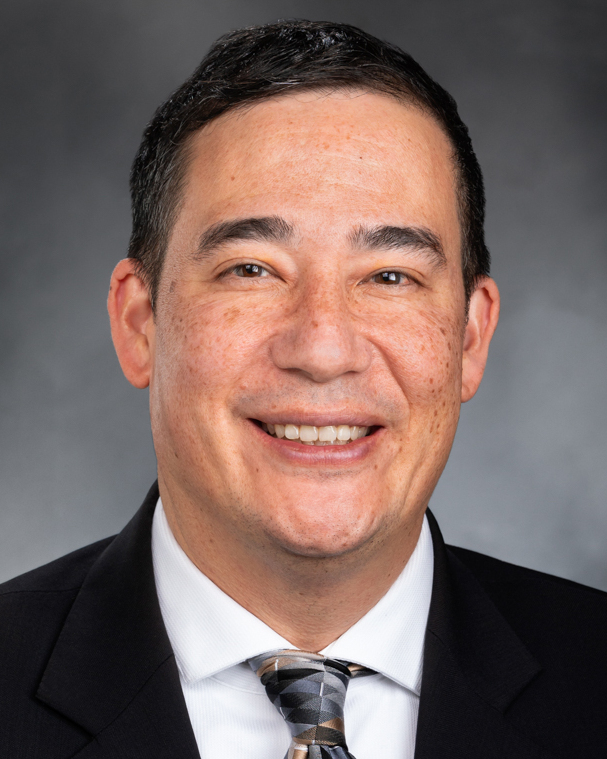
- Incumbent; Steve Hobbs since November 22, 2021
- Style: Mr. or Madam Secretary (informal); The Honorable (formal)
- Seat: Washington State Capitol; Olympia, Washington
- Term length: Four years, no term limits
- Constituting instrument: Washington Constitution of 1889: Article II, Section 1; Article III, Sections 1, 3, 4, 10, 12, 15, 17, 18, and 24; Article IV, Sections 3 and 28; Article V, Section 2; Article XXVII, Section 12; and Article XXVIII, Section 1
- Inaugural holder: Allan Weir
- Formation: November 11, 1889 (136 years ago)
- Salary: $154,588
- Website: Official page

The secretary of state of Washington is an independently elected constitutional officer in the executive branch of the government of the U.S. state of Washington. Fifteen individuals have held the office of Secretary of State since statehood. The incumbent is Steve Hobbs, a Democrat.

The secretary of state most notably manages elections, the office that posts the names of candidates for public offices manages the printing and distribution of ballots.

== Qualifications ==
To hold office as secretary of state, a person must be a United States citizen registered to vote in the state of Washington, provide a $10,000 surety bond to the state conditioned on faithful execution of the duties of office, and reside in the city of Olympia, Washington, by the time of inauguration. Only the governor, state treasurer and secretary of state are constitutionally required to live in the capital city.

A surety bond is an official bond that official must pay to ensure that can be held accountable in cases of fraud or malpractice. The surety bond for Secretary of State is $10,000 to cover the duration of a 4-year commission.

Every 10 years the U.S Census Bureau requires a redistricting of the national, state and local legislatures to ensure that U.S citizens get equal representation. This process involves the secretary of state, the governor and the state legislatures playing key roles in deciding the reshaping of districts.

== Powers and duties ==
The secretary of state is in effect the guarantor of the continuity and stability of good government in Washington, with his or her role extending to the certification, filing, and preservation of public records, the supervision of all aspects of state and local elections, and the registration and regulatory oversight of businesses and charities.

=== Records management ===
The secretary of state is the keeper of the Seal of Washington as prescribed by the constitution, and as such is responsible for regulating its use and certifying to the official acts of the Legislature and governor. In this role, the secretary of state has additional duties related to the disposition of state honors and records. For example, the secretary of state regulates the use of the Washington State flag and is an ex officio non-voting member on the committees for the Washington Medal of Valor and the Washington Medal of Merit. Similarly, the secretary of state directs and supervises Washington's state archives and state library. The state archive coordinates the preservation and management of public records across government, whereas the state library maintains libraries in correctional and mental health institutions and supports scholarly study of its vast research collections.

=== Election administration ===
The Elections Division of the Office of the Secretary of State has general oversight of election administration throughout the state, with individual county auditors being responsible for candidate registration, ballot preparation, polling, and canvassing. The secretary of state exercises this constitutional power, duty, and authority as chief election officer by accrediting the balloting procedures used by each county, certifying the results of elections, verifying petition signatures used to qualify initiatives and referendums, and distributing the state voter's pamphlet and official notice of elections advertisements. Lobbying and campaign finance are separately regulated by the Washington State Public Disclosure Commission.

=== Business registration ===
The Corporations Division of the Office of the Secretary of State registers a variety of business associations by virtue of the secretary of state's role as company register, including corporations, cooperatives, limited liability companies, limited liability partnerships, limited partnerships, assumed business names, and trademarks. The secretary also regulates charities and charitable trusts, including registering individuals, organizations and commercial fundraisers involved in charitable solicitations. Unlike in some other states however, the secretary of state is not responsible for commissioning notaries or recording liens or financing statements under the Uniform Commercial Code. Those functions are instead performed by the Washington State Department of Licensing.

=== Miscellaneous duties ===
A variety of miscellaneous duties have been assigned to the secretary of state through statute, including coordination of the state's Address Confidentiality Program and administration of the state's workplace giving program, "the Combined Fund Drive". Constitutionally speaking, the secretary of state is likewise second (behind the lieutenant governor) in the line of succession to the office of Governor of Washington.

Additionally the Secretary of State regulates the use of the state seal, filing or attesting to acts of the legislature or governor, certifying to the legislature all matters legally required to be certified.

== List of Washington secretaries of state ==
The State of Washington has had a total of sixteen secretaries of state:

#	Image	Name	Term	Party
1		Allen Weir	1890–1893	Republican
2		James Price	1893–1897	Republican
3		Will Jenkins	1897–1901	Populist
4		Sam Nichols	1901–1909	Republican
5		Ithamar Howell	1909–1920	Republican
6		Jay Hinkle	1920–1933	Republican
7		Ernest Hutchinson	1933–1938	Democratic
8		Belle Reeves	1938–1948	Democratic
9		Earl Coe	1948–1957	Democratic
10		Victor Aloysius Meyers	1957–1965	Democratic
11		Lud Kramer	1965–1975	Republican
12		Bruce K. Chapman	1975–1981	Republican
13		Ralph Munro	1981–2001	Republican
14		Sam Reed	2001–2013	Republican
15		Kim Wyman	2013–2021	Republican
16		Steve Hobbs	2021–present	Democratic

== See also ==
- The Washington Medal of Merit
- List of company registers
