= D. E. Biggs =

American politician

Dr. D. E. Biggs
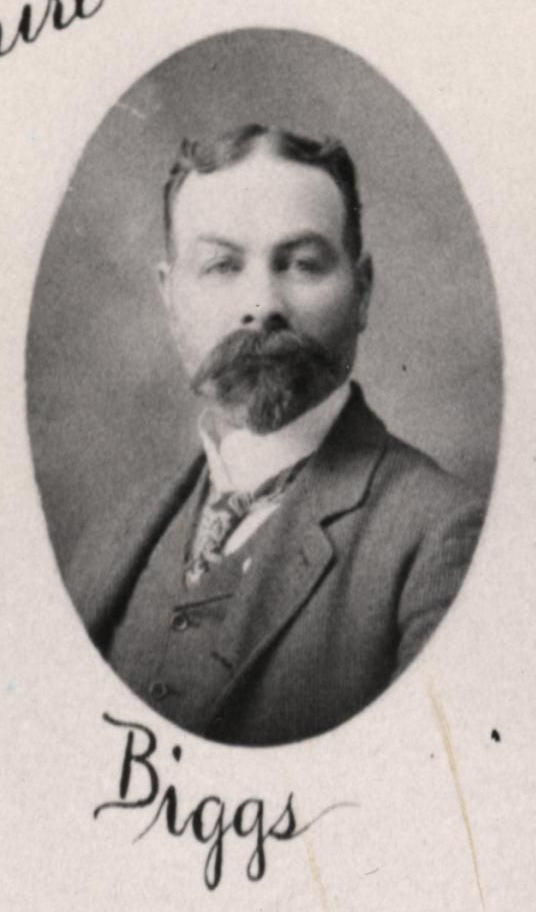
- Biggs in 1901

Member of the Washington State Senate for the 34th district
- In office 1899–1903

Member of the Washington House of Representatives for the 49th district
- In office 1885–1897

Personal details
- Born: 1860 Cincinnati, Ohio, United States
- Died: February 17, 1924 (aged 63–64) Coos County, Oregon
- Party: Democratic

Dennis Elmore Biggs (1860 – February 17, 1924) was an American politician in the state of Washington. A Democrat, he served in the Washington State Senate and Washington House of Representatives.
