= George Nethercutt =

American lawyer and politician (1944–2024)

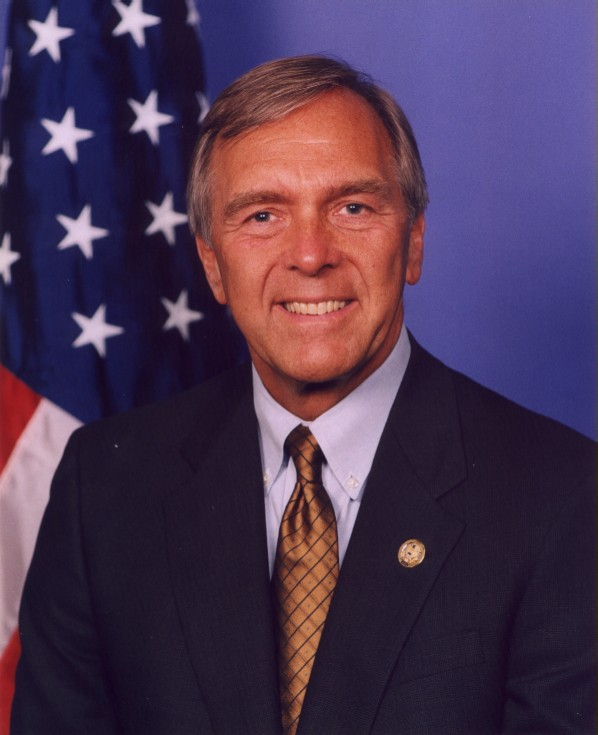

Member of the U.S. House of Representatives from Washington's 5th district
- In office January 3, 1995 – January 3, 2005
- Preceded by: Tom Foley
- Succeeded by: Cathy McMorris Rodgers

Personal details
- Born: George Rector Nethercutt Jr. October 7, 1944 Spokane, Washington, U.S.
- Died: June 14, 2024 (aged 79) Colorado, U.S.
- Party: Republican
- Spouse: Mary Beth Socha (m. 1977)
- Children: 2
- Education: Washington State University (BA); Gonzaga University (JD)

George Rector Nethercutt Jr. (October 7, 1944 – June 14, 2024) was an American lawyer, author, and politician. A member of the Republican Party, he rose to national attention upon his election to the U.S. House of Representatives in 1994, when he defeated Tom Foley, the speaker of the house, in Washington's 5th congressional district. Nethercutt served five terms and left the House in 2004, when he mounted an unsuccessful bid for the U.S. Senate.

== Early life ==
George Rector Nethercutt Jr. was born in Spokane, Washington, in 1944, the son of Nancy (Sampson) and George Nethercutt, a school board president. A graduate of North Central High School, he earned a B.A. in English from Washington State University in 1967 and a J.D. degree from Gonzaga University in 1971. He worked as a clerk for Alaskan federal Judge Raymond Plummer. Nethercutt then served as staff counsel and later chief of staff to Senator Ted Stevens (R-AK) from 1972 to 1977 before returning to private practice in Washington State.

Nethercutt served as a town attorney for the communities of Reardan, Creston and Almira. He was a chair of the Spokane County Republican Party. He was the co-founder of the Vanessa Behan Crisis Nursery.

== Congressional career ==
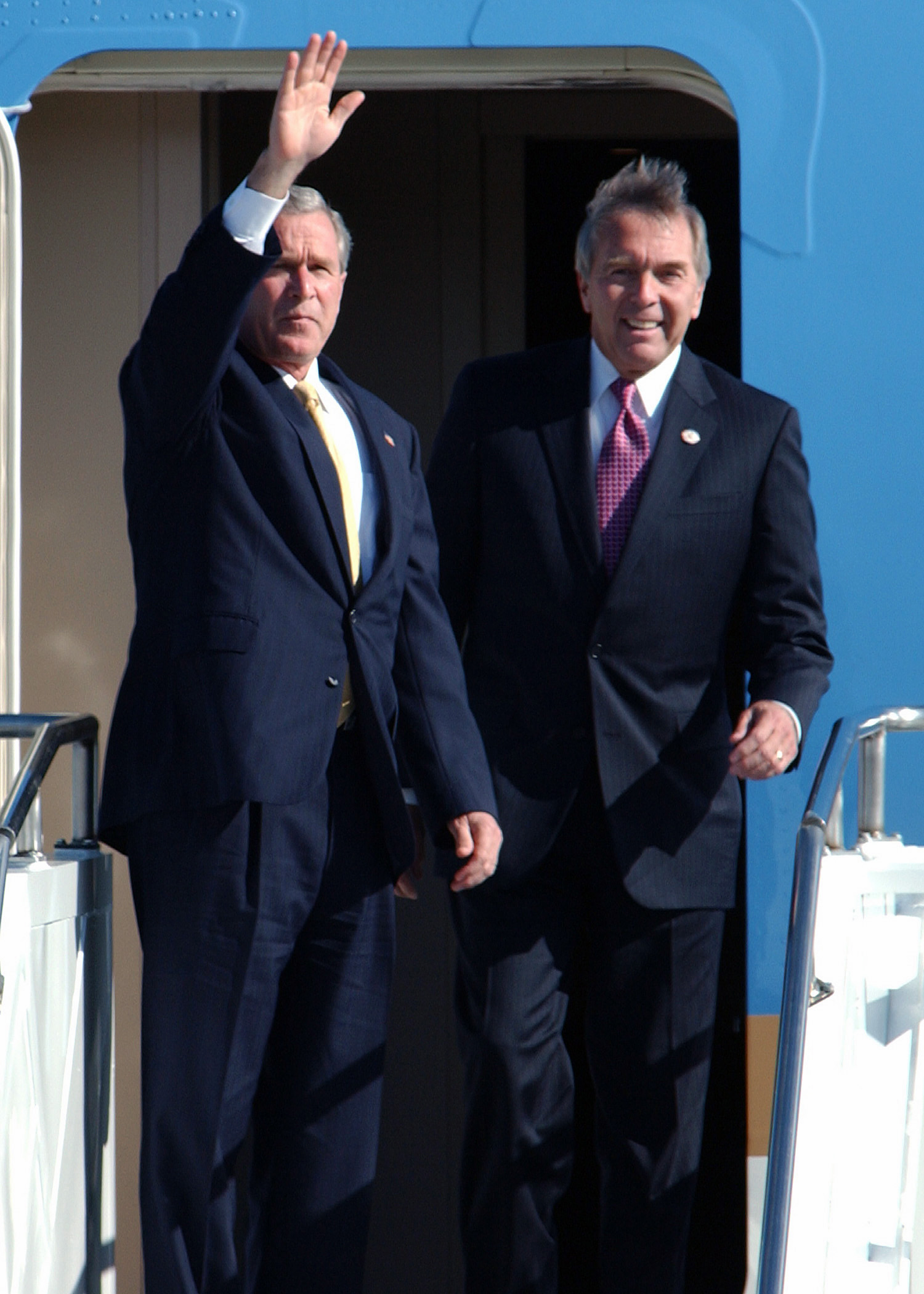
Nethercutt with President George W. Bush in June 2004

Nethercutt was first elected to Congress in 1994 in a dramatic election in which he unseated the Speaker of the House, Tom Foley. It was the first time he had run for office. The district had been growing more conservative since the early 1980s, but Foley had held on mainly by running up his totals in Democratic-leaning Spokane. In the 1994 election, however, Nethercutt ran up his totals in the more rural areas of the district while holding Foley to a margin of only 9,000 votes in Spokane and 3,000 in Spokane County, which allowed him to prevail by 4,000 votes. This marked the first time a sitting Speaker of the House was unseated since 1862, and was part of a massive national Republican landslide that saw the GOP take control of the House for the first time in 40 years. In Congress, he sat on the House Appropriations Committee and the House Science Committee. Like most Republicans elected in the 1994 wave, he had a strongly conservative voting record.

Nethercutt's campaign against Foley, a 30-year incumbent, included significant attention to Foley's opposition to term limits. In 1992, Washington state voters approved a ballot measure limiting the terms of Washington officials, including federal officials such as U.S. Representatives. Foley brought suit contesting the constitutionality of this limit and won in court. Nethercutt repeatedly cited the caption of Foley's lawsuit – "Foley against the People of the State of Washington." He also promised to serve no more than three terms (six years) in the House.

In the 1996 elections, the Democrats mounted a serious bid to regain the seat, but Nethercutt won by an unexpectedly large 12-point margin even as Bill Clinton narrowly carried the district. He was handily reelected in 1998. In 2000, when his self-imposed three-term limit would have kicked in, Nethercutt changed his mind and announced his intention to run again, infuriating term-limits supporters. Nethercutt was nevertheless re-elected without much difficulty in 2000 and 2002.

Nethercutt's congressional papers are held at Gonzaga University.

== 2004 Senate race ==
Rather than running for a sixth term in the House of Representatives, Nethercutt decided to run for U.S. Senate in 2004, hoping to unseat the incumbent, Senator Patty Murray. He was encouraged to run for the seat by President George W. Bush. Term limits again became an issue in the campaign, as Democrats quickly seized on Nethercutt's broken term-limits pledge.

Nethercutt was also hampered by his lack of name recognition in the more densely populated western part of the state, home to two-thirds of the state's population. Washington has not elected a senator from east of the Cascades since Clarence Dill in 1928. Other important issues included national security and the war in Iraq. Nethercutt supported the invasion of Iraq, while Murray opposed it.

Nethercutt was a heavy underdog, and his campaign never gained much traction. In November, he lost by 345,124 votes, receiving 43% of the vote to Murray's 55%. While he dominated the eastern portion of the state, including his own congressional district, he only won two counties west of the Cascades, Clark County and Lewis County.

== Post-congressional life ==
Nethercutt left the House of Representatives at the end of his term in January 2005, but said that he would probably not completely retire from politics. In 2005, he and two other political veterans (former Interior Department deputy secretary J. Steven Griles and former White House national energy policy director Andrew Lundquist) formed the political lobbying firm Lundquist, Nethercutt & Griles, LLC. Griles resigned in 2007, after he pleaded guilty to obstruction of justice in connection with the Abramoff scandal, the top Bush administration official to do so.

Nethercutt served as Chairman of Nethercutt Consulting LLC, was of counsel for the law firms of Bluewater Strategies and Lee & Hayes, and was a member of several corporate boards. He was the author of the book In Tune with America: Our History in Song. He wrote a monthly column for The Pacific Northwest Inlander newspaper, and recorded radio commentaries for several radio stations.

He was also a board member on the Dutch board of JDRF (Juvenile Diabetes Research Foundation).

Nethercutt founded The George Nethercutt Foundation in Spokane, Washington. The Foundation is a nonpartisan nonprofit organization dedicated to fostering civic involvement. The foundation accepts applications from college students who aspire to be Nethercutt Fellows. The Nethercutt Fellowship involves, among other things, a trip to Washington, D.C. where fellows have the opportunity to see the inner-workings of the United States government.

== Personal life and death ==
Nethercutt married Mary Beth Socha in 1977, and they had two children. He died from progressive supranuclear palsy in Colorado on June 14, 2024, at the age of 79.

== Electoral history ==
Washington's 5th congressional district: Results 1994–2002
Year	Democratic	Votes	Pct	Republican	Votes	Pct	3rd Party	Party	Votes	Pct
1994	Thomas S. Foley (incumbent)	106,074	49%	George R. Nethercutt, Jr.	110,057	51%				
1996	Judy Olson	105,166	44%	George R. Nethercutt, Jr. (incumbent)	131,618	56%				
1998	Brad Lyons	73,545	38%	George R. Nethercutt, Jr. (incumbent)	110,040	57%	John Beal	American Heritage	9,673	5%
2000	Tom Keefe	97,703	39%	George R. Nethercutt, Jr. (incumbent)	144,038	57%	Greg Holmes	Libertarian	9,473	4%
2002	Bart Haggin	65,146	32%	George R. Nethercutt, Jr. (incumbent)	126,757	63%	Rob Chase	Libertarian	10,379	5%

Washington Senator (Class III) results: 2004
Year	Democratic	Votes	Pct	Republican	Votes	Pct	3rd Party	Party	Votes	Pct	3rd Party	Party	Votes	Pct
2004	Patty Murray (incumbent)	1,549,708	55%	George R. Nethercutt, Jr.	1,204,584	43%	J. Mills	Libertarian	34,055	1%	Mark B. Wilson	Green	30,304	1%

== Books ==
- Nethercutt Jr., George R. (with Tom M. McArthur). (2010) In Tune with America: Our History in Song. Marquette Books LLC. ISBN 978-0-982-65970-0
- Nethercutt Jr., George R. (2022) Saving Patriotism: American Patriotism in a Global Era. Marquette Books LLC. ISBN 978-1-732-71972-9

U.S. House of Representatives
Preceded by Tom Foley	Member of the U.S. House of Representatives from Washington's 5th congressional district 1995–2005	Succeeded by Cathy McMorris Rodgers
Party political offices
Preceded by Linda Smith	Republican nominee for United States Senator from Washington (Class 3); 2004	Succeeded by Dino Rossi
