= Ambrose E. Gonzales =

American journalist (1857–1926)

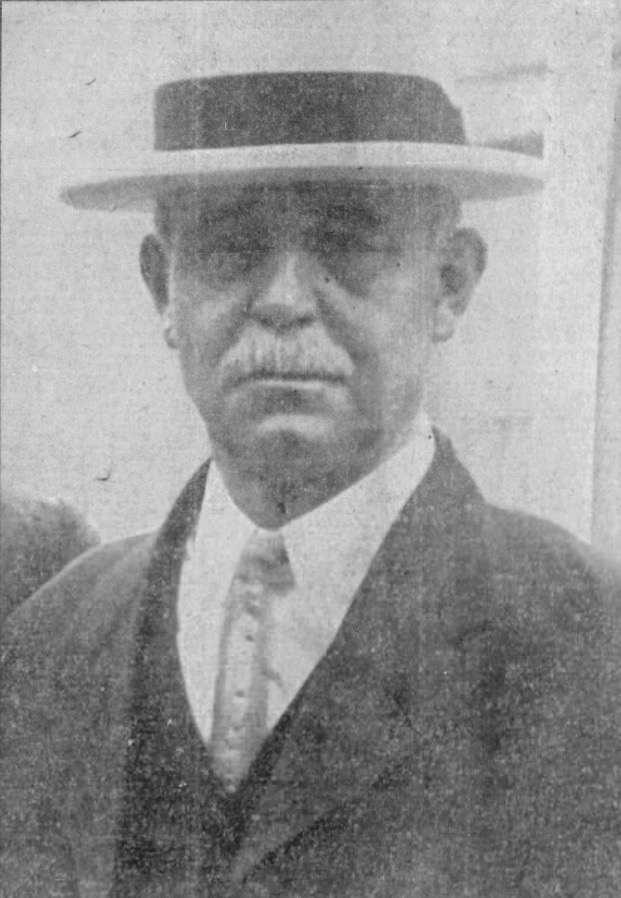

Ambrose Elliott Gonzales (May 27, 1857 – July 11, 1926) was a newspaper founder, with his brother, and wrote stories about African Americans. He was born on a plantation in Colleton County, South Carolina. After working as a telegraph operator, he and his brother Narciso Gonzales founded the newspaper The State. His paper opposed lynching and advocated for voting rights. It was critical of South Carolina's white supremacist governor Benjamin Tillman whose nephew James H. Tillman murdered Narcsico Gonzalez. Ambrose Elliott Gonzales is remembered as a pioneering journalist in South Carolina and the writer of black dialect sketches on the Gullah people of the South Carolina and Georgia Lowcountry.

== Family ==
Gonzales was the son of Colonel Ambrosio José Gonzales and Harriet Rutledge Elliot. His father was a colonel in the Confederate Army who played an instrumental role in defending South Carolina during the American Civil War after he had been a Cuban revolutionary leader who opposed the oppressive Spanish rule. His mother was the daughter of the wealthy South Carolina rice planter, state senator and writer, William Elliott. Gonzales was an uncle of Robert E. Gonzales.

== Early career ==
Although he had no formal education after 17, Ambrose Gonzales became the telegraph operator in Grahamville, South Carolina, in October 1874, to help support his large extended family. His work as a telegraph operator led to his involvement in state politics. During the controversial election of 1876, his telegraph office became the primary source of election results in the region of Beaufort County, South Carolina for both the presidential race, between Rutherford B. Hayes and Samuel Tilden, and gubernatorial race in which Wade Hampton III ran on a platform of ending Reconstruction. Gonzales became a Bourbon Democrat.

In 1879, Gonzales left the telegraph office in Grahamville to manage the family plantation, Oak Lawn, on the Edisto River. After several years of failing harvests, he left for New York City in 1881, where he became a telegrapher for Western Union while he partook of the rich cultural life of the city. He left for New Orleans in the autumn of 1882 to work as a telegrapher, but he returned to New York the next year. In 1885, he left New York for good and returned to South Carolina to join his brother Narciso Gener Gonzales on the staff of the Charleston, South Carolina News and Courier.

== Founding of The State ==
Ambrose and Narciso Gonzales founded The State in Columbia, South Carolina, in 1891. The newspaper supported a number of progressive causes; its editorials called for an end to lynching, the reform of child labor laws, and women's suffrage. It was also frequently critical of the policies of Benjamin Tillman, who had been elected governor of South Carolina in 1890.

In 1903, James H. Tillman, Benjamin's nephew, killed Narciso in broad daylight but was acquitted for self-defense in a trial that was widely considered to be rigged. The real reason seems to be the paper's opposition to the Tillmans.

== Gullah ==
Gonzales grew up speaking Gullah with the slaves (and later freedmen) who worked on his family's rice plantations, and his knowledge of the language was to be considered extraordinary by other members of the Low Country planter class. After he published a few sketches in Gullah in his newspaper, public interest in his stories prompted him to author several books of Gullah writings, including The Black Border (1922) and With Aesop Along the Black Border (1924). Gonzales won accolades as a publisher and journalist during his lifetime, but he was especially proud of his literary works based on Gullah.

Modern scholars have questioned the accuracy of Gonzales's representation of Gullah speech, but his books remain a valuable source of information on how Gullah was spoken in the 19th century.

== Honors ==
Gonzales has been inducted into the South Carolina Business Hall of Fame.

== Bibliography ==
- (1922) The Black Border: Gullah Stories of the Carolina Coast, Columbia, S.C.: The State Company. Available online
- (1924) The Captain: Stories of the Black Border, Columbia, S.C.: The State Company.
- (1924) With Aesop Along the Black Border, Columbia, S.C.: The State Company.
- (1924) Laguerre: A Gascon of the Black Border, Columbia, S.C.: The State Company.
