= Frank B. Gary =

American politician

Frank Boyd Gary
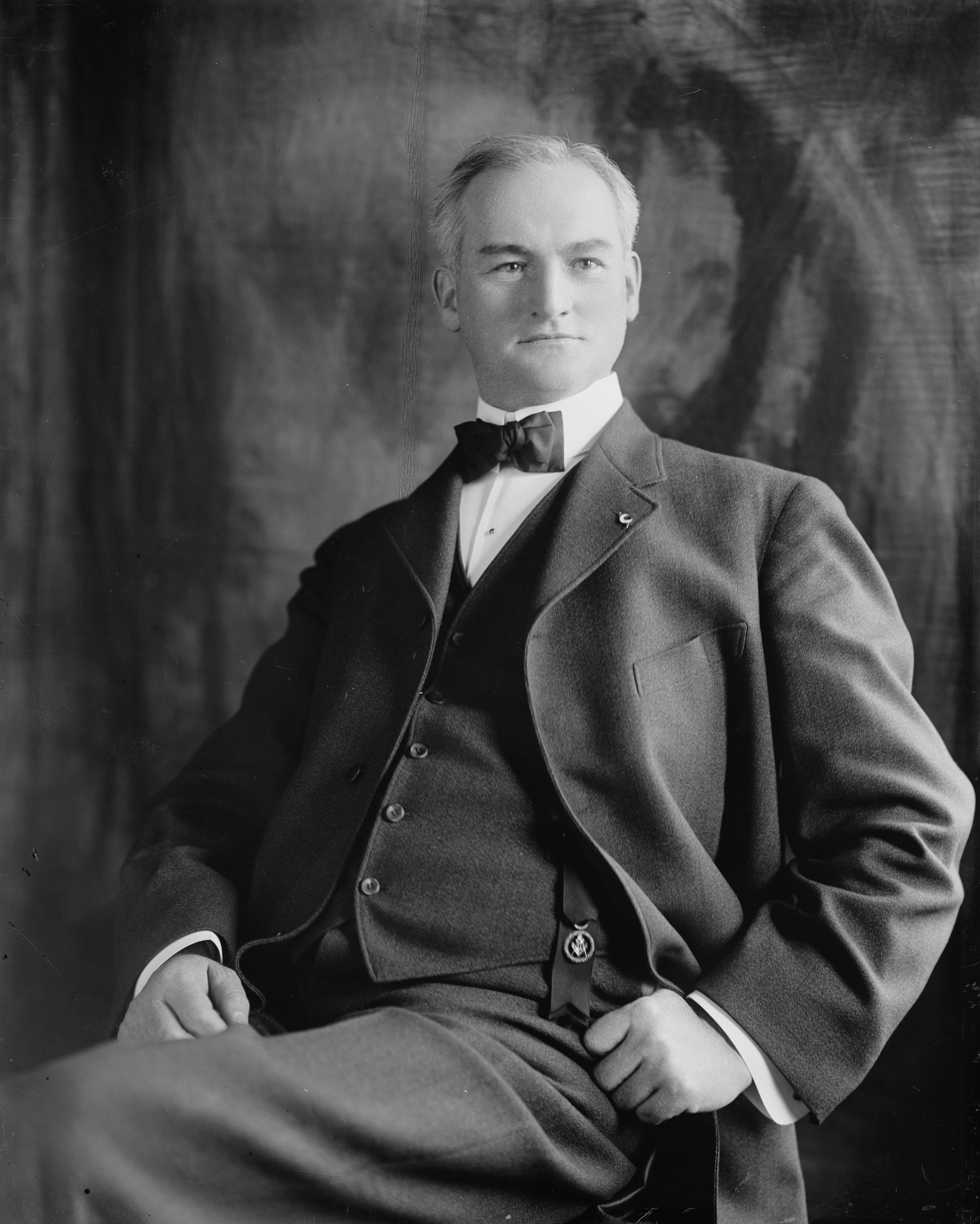

United States Senator from South Carolina
- In office March 6, 1908 – March 4, 1909
- Preceded by: Asbury Latimer
- Succeeded by: Ellison D. Smith

38th Speaker of the South Carolina House of Representatives
- In office January 30, 1896 – January 8, 1901
- Preceded by: Ira B. Jones
- Succeeded by: William Francis Stevenson

Member of the South Carolina House of Representatives from Abbeville County
- In office January 10, 1911 – January 17, 1912
- In office January 8, 1907 – March 6, 1908
- In office November 25, 1890 – January 8, 1901

Personal details
- Born: March 9, 1860 Cokesbury, South Carolina
- Died: December 7, 1922 (aged 62) Charleston, South Carolina
- Party: Democratic

Frank Boyd Gary (March 9, 1860 – December 7, 1922) was a United States senator from South Carolina.

== Early life ==
Born in Cokesbury, South Carolina, he attended the Cokesbury Conference School and Union College (Schenectady, New York). He studied law, was admitted to the bar and commenced practice in Abbeville, South Carolina in 1881.

== Political career ==
From 1890 to 1900 he was a member of the South Carolina House of Representatives, serving as speaker from 1895 to 1900. He was a delegate to the State constitutional convention in 1895 and was a member of the State house of representatives in 1906.

Gary was elected as a Democrat to the U.S. Senate to fill the vacancy caused by the death of Asbury C. Latimer and served from March 6, 1908, to March 4, 1909; he was not a candidate for reelection in 1908, and after his time in the Senate he was again a member of the State house of representatives in 1910. He was elected judge of the eighth judicial circuit in 1912 and served until his death in Charleston, South Carolina in 1922; interment was in Long Cane Cemetery, Abbeville, South Carolina.

Frank B. Gary was also appointed as special judge in Lexington County in the 1903 trial of James H. Tillman (lieutenant governor of South Carolina and nephew of Senator "Pitchfork" Ben Tillman) for the murder of N.G. Gonzales (founding editor of The State, Columbia, SC's newspaper).

It has been alleged that Gary was a "Tillmanite", although there is no strong evidence of his being partisan in the trial. However, the jury was considered highly rigged and partisan considering Tillman shot Gonzales in broad daylight with many eyewitnesses. Tillman was acquitted ostensibly on a self-defense theory, but more likely because the jury believed Tillman was justified. Gonzales had waged a virtual crusade against Tillman in the newspaper, helping ensure his defeat in the 1902 gubernatorial election.

U.S. Senate
Preceded by Asbury C. Latimer	U.S. senator (Class 3) from South Carolina; 1908–1909; Served alongside: Benjamin R. Tillman	Succeeded by Ellison D. Smith
