= Senator Poindexter =

Senator Poindexter may refer to:

- George Poindexter (1779–1853), U.S. Senator from Mississippi from 1830 to 1835
- Miles Poindexter (1868–1946), U.S. Senator from Washington from 1911 to 1923
