= 2004 United States Senate election in Washington =

- November 2, 2004
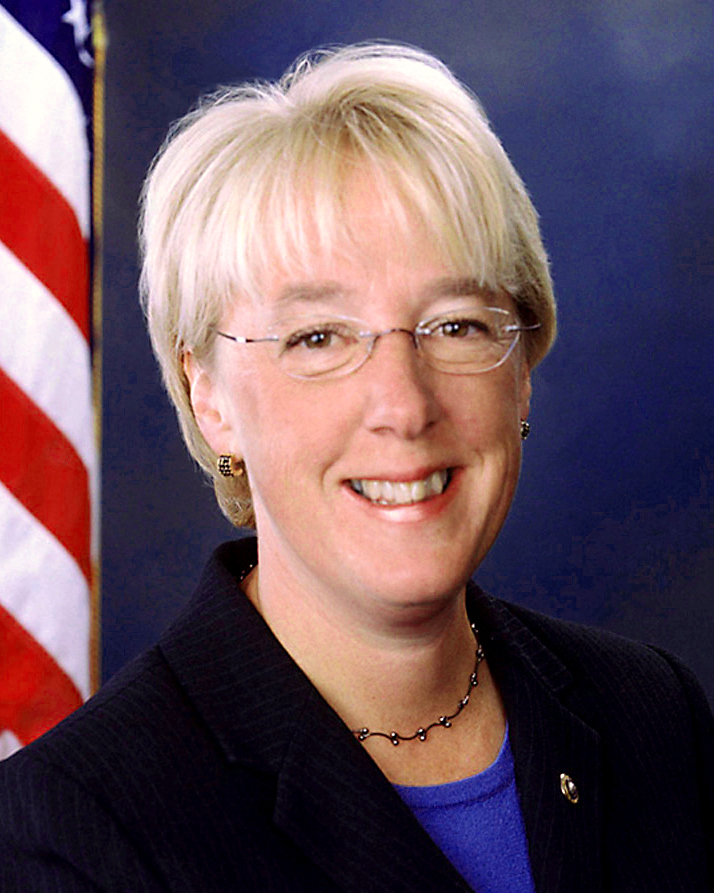

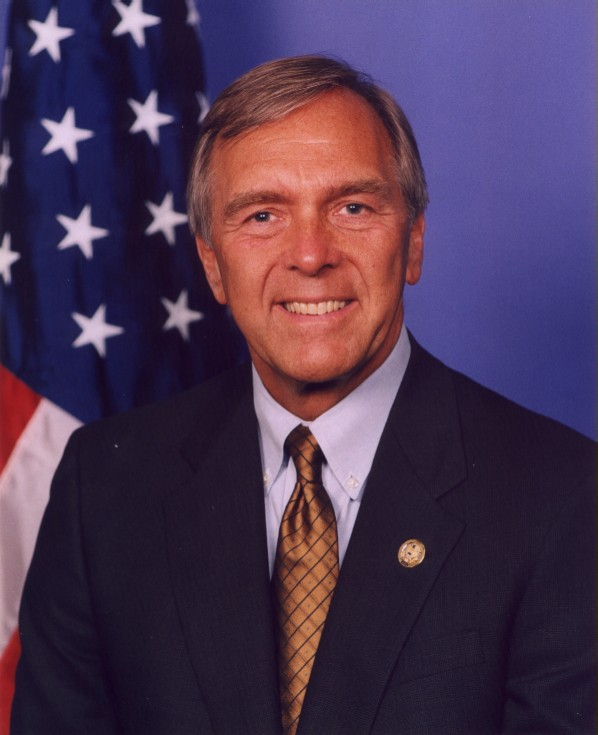
Nominee	Patty Murray	George Nethercutt
Party	Democratic	Republican
Popular vote	1,549,708	1,204,584
Percentage	54.98%	42.74%
- County results Murray: 40–50% 50–60% 60–70% Nethercutt: 40–50% 50–60% 60–70%
U.S. senator before election
Patty Murray
Democratic
Elected U.S. Senator
Patty Murray
Democratic

The 2004 United States Senate election in Washington was held on November 2, 2004. Incumbent Democrat U.S. senator Patty Murray won re-election to a third term, defeating Republican U.S. representative George Nethercutt. She became only the fourth Washington senator to win 3 consecutive terms, just after fellow Democrats Warren G. Magnuson and Scoop Jackson. Nethercutt was known for having defeated Tom Foley, the sitting speaker of the House of Representatives, as part of the 1994 Republican wave.

Term limits became an issue in the campaign, as Democrats seized on Nethercutt's broken term-limits pledge that he had made when he had unseated Foley in 1994. Geography was also against Nethercutt, who was severely hampered by his lack of name recognition in the more densely populated western part of the state, home to two-thirds of the state's population. Washington has not elected a Senator from east of the Cascades since Clarence Dill in 1928. Other important issues included national security and the war in Iraq. Nethercutt supported the invasion of Iraq, while Murray opposed it.

Nethercutt was considered a heavy underdog from the start, and his campaign never gained much traction. In November, he lost by 12 points, receiving 43 percent of the vote to Murray's 55 percent. He only carried two counties west of the Cascades.

== Major candidates ==
=== Democratic ===
- Patty Murray, incumbent U.S. Senator

=== Republican ===
- George Nethercutt, U.S. Representative

== General election ==
=== Predictions ===
Source	Ranking	As of
Sabato's Crystal Ball	Likely D	November 1, 2004

=== Endorsements ===
Patty Murray (D)

Newspapers

- The Seattle Times

=== Polling ===
Poll source	Date(s) administered	Sample size	Margin of error	Patty Murray (D)	George Nethercutt (R)	Undecided
SurveyUSA	October 29–31, 2004	622 (LV)	± 4%	51%	45%	3%
Strategic Vision (R)	October 29–31, 2004	801 (LV)	± 3%	50%	42%	8%
Strategic Vision (R)	October 24–26, 2004	801 (LV)	± 3%	49%	41%	10%
Mason-Dixon	October 25–26, 2004	800 (RV)	± 3.5%	53%	39%	8%
SurveyUSA	October 23–25, 2004	618 (LV)	± 4%	55%	41%	4%
Strategic Vision (R)	October 16–18, 2004	801 (LV)	± 3%	49%	41%	10%
SurveyUSA	October 15–17, 2004	634 (LV)	± 4%	56%	38%	6%
Elway Research	October 14–16, 2004	405 (RV)	± 5%	54%	37%	9%
Strategic Vision (R)	October 4–6, 2004	801 (LV)	± 3%	49%	41%	10%
SurveyUSA	October 2–4, 2004	640 (LV)	± 4%	57%	38%	5%
Strategic Vision (R)	September 20–22, 2004	801 (LV)	± 3%	48%	41%	11%
SurveyUSA	September 19–21, 2004	627 (LV)	± 4%	53%	41%	6%
Elway Research	September 17–19, 2004	405 (RV)	± 5%	57%	37%	6%
Strategic Vision (R)	September 4–6, 2004	801 (LV)	± 3%	48%	41%	11%
Strategic Vision (R)	August 21–23, 2004	801 (LV)	± 3%	49%	41%	10%
SurveyUSA	August 15–17, 2004	602 (LV)	± 4.1%	53%	39%	10%
Strategic Vision (R)	August 9–11, 2004	801 (LV)	± 3%	49%	40%	11%
SurveyUSA	Jul 31–Aug 2, 2004	585 (LV)	± 4.2%	51%	40%	9%
Fairbank, Maslin, Maullin & Associates (D)	June 23–28, 2004	800 (RV)	± 3.8%	56%	33%	11%
Moore Information (R)	June 23–24, 2004	500 (RV)	± 4%	51%	39%	10%
Mason-Dixon (D)	June 9–11, 2004	625 (RV)	± 4%	53%	34%	13%
SurveyUSA	June 1–3, 2004	654 (RV)	± 4%	49%	34%	17%
Tarrance Group (R)	May 2–3, 2004	500 (LV)	± 4.5%	50.6%	41.1%	8.3%
Fairbank, Maslin, Maullin & Associates (D)	April 22–27, 2004	800 (LV)	± 3.8%	54%	31%	15%
Tarrance Group (R)	May 5–6, 2003	504 (LV)	± 4.5%	52%	37%	11%

Hypothetical polling

Poll source	Date(s) administered	Sample size	Margin of error	Patty Murray (D)	George Nethercutt (R)	Reed Davis (R)	Undecided
Elway Research	January 27–29, 2004	405 (V)	± 5%	49%	19%	5%	27%

Poll source	Date(s) administered	Sample size	Margin of error	Patty Murray (D)	Jennifer Dunn (R)	Undecided
for NRSC (R)	January 2003	500 (RV)	± 4.4%	46%	42%	12%

=== Results ===
The election was not close, with Murray winning by 12.24% of the vote. Although Murray failed to win any counties in the eastern part of the state, she pulled down big margins from the western part of the state, which is significantly more populated. Specifically, Murray trounced Nethercutt in King County, home of Seattle, the most populous county in the state. Murray was sworn in for a third term on January 3, 2005.

2004 United States Senate election in Washington
Party	Candidate	Votes	%	±%
Democratic	Patty Murray (Incumbent)	1,549,708	54.98%	–3.43%
Republican	George Nethercutt	1,204,584	42.74%	+1.15%
Libertarian	J. Mills	34,055	1.21%	N/A
Green	Mark Wilson	30,304	1.08%	N/A
Total votes		2,818,651	100.00%	N/A
Democratic hold				

==== By county ====
County	Patty Murray Democratic		George Nethercutt Republican		Various candidates Other parties		Margin		Total
County	#	%	#	%	#	%	#	%	Total
Adams	1,607	31.75%	3,362	66.43%	92	1.82%	-1,755	-34.68%	5,061
Asotin	3,511	40.48%	4,985	57.48%	177	2.04%	-1,474	-17.00%	8,673
Benton	25,863	39.20%	38,690	58.64%	1,430	2.17%	-12,827	-19.44%	65,983
Chelan	11,307	39.34%	16,874	58.71%	561	1.95%	-5,567	-19.37%	28,742
Clallam	17,817	49.38%	17,298	47.94%	967	2.68%	519	1.44%	36,082
Clark	80,134	48.31%	81,888	49.36%	3,861	2.33%	-1,754	-1.06%	165,883
Columbia	741	35.22%	1,318	62.64%	45	2.14%	-577	-27.42%	2,104
Cowlitz	22,535	53.95%	18,301	43.81%	936	2.24%	4,234	10.14%	41,772
Douglas	4,893	36.93%	8,128	61.34%	230	1.74%	-3,235	-24.41%	13,251
Ferry	1,362	41.12%	1,847	55.77%	103	3.11%	-485	-14.64%	3,312
Franklin	6,215	38.93%	9,495	59.48%	253	1.58%	-3,280	-20.55%	15,963
Garfield	417	31.93%	872	66.77%	17	1.30%	-455	-34.84%	1,306
Grant	9,015	35.05%	16,091	62.55%	618	2.40%	-7,076	-27.51%	25,724
Grays Harbor	15,830	57.34%	11,220	40.64%	557	2.02%	4,610	16.70%	27,607
Island	19,181	50.58%	17,969	47.39%	770	2.03%	1,212	3.20%	37,920
Jefferson	11,573	62.70%	6,415	34.75%	471	2.55%	5,158	27.94%	18,459
King	573,506	65.20%	287,456	32.68%	18,693	2.13%	286,050	32.52%	879,655
Kitsap	63,684	54.32%	50,574	43.14%	2,974	2.54%	13,110	11.18%	117,232
Kittitas	7,182	45.10%	8,367	52.54%	377	2.37%	-1,185	-7.44%	15,926
Klickitat	4,184	46.38%	4,609	51.09%	228	2.53%	-425	-4.71%	9,021
Lewis	11,583	36.33%	19,474	61.07%	830	2.60%	-7,891	-24.75%	31,887
Lincoln	1,956	33.92%	3,703	64.21%	108	1.87%	-1,747	-30.29%	5,767
Mason	13,349	53.29%	10,998	43.90%	703	2.81%	2,351	9.39%	25,050
Okanogan	6,616	41.18%	8,931	55.58%	521	3.24%	-2,315	-14.41%	16,068
Pacific	5,850	56.96%	4,149	40.40%	271	2.64%	1,701	16.56%	10,270
Pend Oreille	2,703	44.07%	3,241	52.84%	190	3.10%	-538	-8.77%	6,134
Pierce	167,428	53.99%	136,084	43.88%	6,615	2.13%	31,344	10.11%	310,127
San Juan	6,376	64.28%	3,164	31.90%	379	3.82%	3,212	32.38%	9,919
Skagit	26,162	50.60%	24,364	47.12%	1,181	2.28%	1,798	3.48%	51,707
Skamania	2,550	50.76%	2,314	46.06%	160	3.18%	236	4.70%	5,024
Snohomish	160,402	54.93%	124,986	42.80%	6,615	2.27%	35,416	12.13%	292,003
Spokane	94,446	47.08%	101,511	50.60%	4,653	2.32%	-7,065	-3.52%	200,610
Stevens	7,706	38.33%	11,804	58.71%	594	2.95%	-4,098	-20.38%	20,104
Thurston	63,364	57.14%	44,417	40.06%	3,108	2.80%	18,947	17.09%	110,889
Wahkiakum	1,086	50.12%	1,018	46.98%	63	2.91%	68	3.14%	2,167
Walla Walla	9,972	43.99%	12,243	54.01%	454	2.00%	-2,271	-10.02%	22,669
Whatcom	48,078	54.21%	38,036	42.88%	2,580	2.91%	10,042	11.32%	88,694
Whitman	8,152	46.00%	9,073	51.20%	496	2.80%	-921	-5.20%	17,721
Yakima	31,372	43.47%	39,315	54.48%	1,478	2.05%	-7,943	-11.01%	72,165
Totals	1,549,708	54.98%	1,204,584	42.74%	64,359	2.28%	345,124	12.24%	2,818,651

==== Counties that flipped from Democratic to Republican ====
- Asotin (Largest city: Clarkston)
- Ferry (Largest city: Republic)
- Kittitas (Largest city: Ellensburg)
- Pend Oreille (Largest city: Newport)
- Spokane (Largest city: Spokane)
- Whitman (Largest city: Pullman)

==== Counties that flipped from Republican to Democratic ====
- Skamania (Largest city: Carson)

== See also ==
- 2004 United States Senate elections
