= Robert E. Gonzales =

American poet and journalist (1888–1916)

Robert Elliott Gonzales
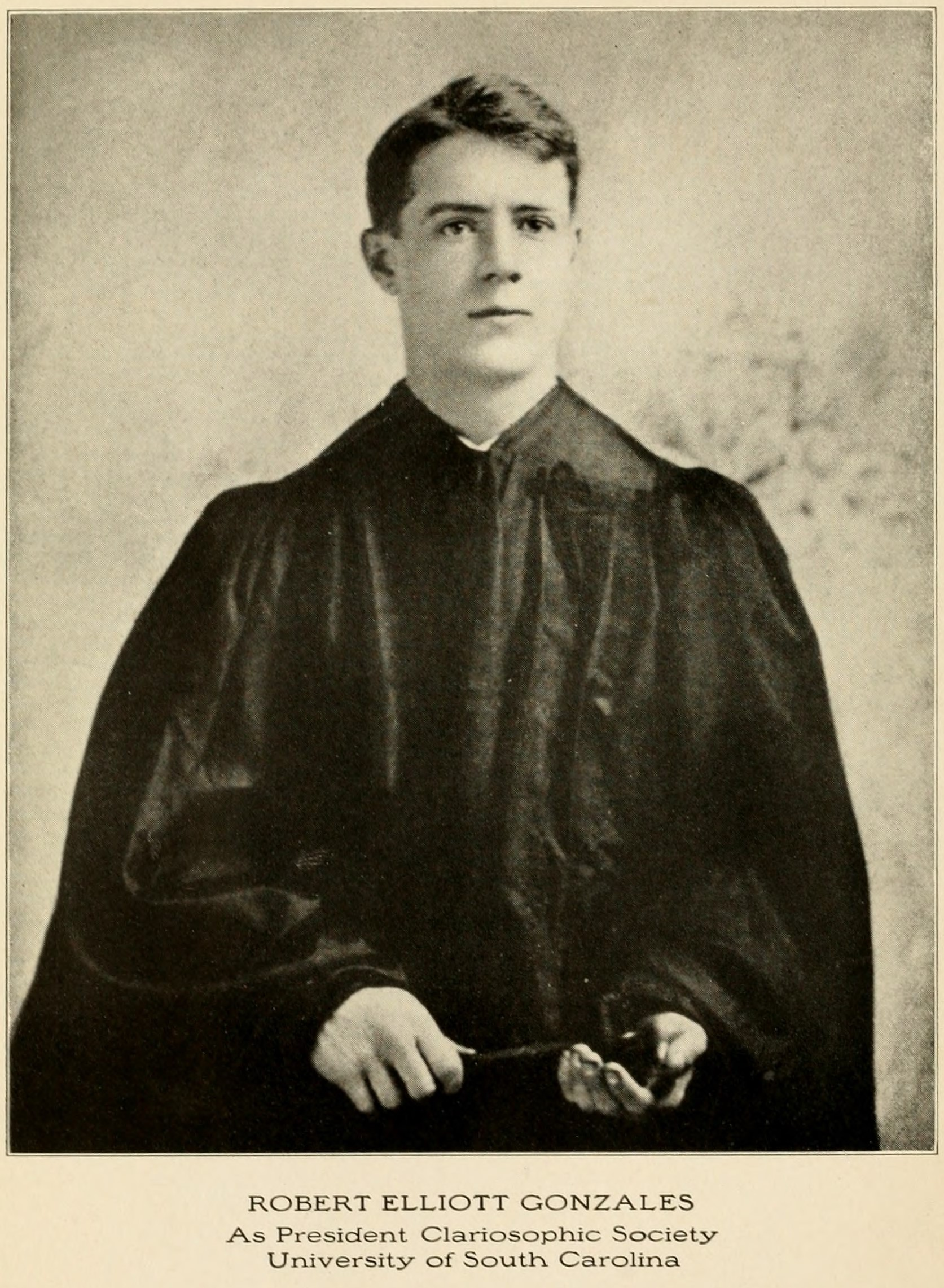
- Gonzales in 1908, during his tenure as president of the Clariosophic Society
- Born: April 18, 1888; Columbia, South Carolina, US
- Died: December 19, 1916 (aged 28); El Paso, Texas, US
- Other name: "Colonel Aftermath"
- Education: University of South Carolina
- Occupations: Poet; Journalist
- Years active: 1904–1916
- Notable work: Poems And Paragraphs
- Relatives: Ambrosio Elliott Gonzales (uncle); Ambrosio José Gonzales (grandfather); Alida Ruffini Gonzales McMaster (sister)

Signature
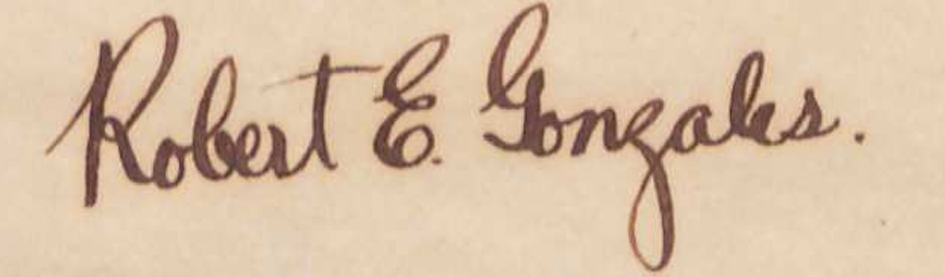

Robert Elliott Gonzales (April 18, 1888 – December 19, 1916) was an American poet and journalist. He was the founding editor of The Gamecock (later renamed The Daily Gamecock) and had a brief but distinguished career at The State.

== Biography ==
Gonzales was the son of American diplomat William Elliott Gonzales and Sarah Cecil Shiver Gonzales.

As a child, he was a choir boy at Trinity Church, Columbia.

=== Education ===
Gonzales first attended a private school taught by Ellen C. Janney, who later recalled that "[h]e was a very bright boy." As a teenager, he attended William H. Verner's preparatory school. Classmate and fellow journalist W.J. Cormack later wrote, "I remember the reserved youth [Gonzales] at William H. Verner's school, who, even at that time—in his early 'teens—gave promise of great ability."

The State described Gonzales as "diffident but cordial" with "hosts of devoted friends."

Gonzales spent a year at The Citadel before transferring to the University of South Carolina.

==== The Clariosophic Society ====
During Gonzales's time at USC, he was an active member of The Clariosophic Society, an all-male literary society. Over the years, he held various positions in the society; in 1908, he served as the president.

==== The Gamecock ====
In 1908, Gonzales founded The Gamecock student newspaper and began his tenure as its first editor-in-chief. In its first issue, published January 30 of that year, he included an editorial describing his vision for the paper:

There is nothing so conducive to the fostering of friendliness as common ownership of common property; in that respect, at least, THE GAMECOCK will be useful. It will bring professor and student in closer touch; it will promote better feeling between the Normal, Academic and Law schools—which, in passing, is sadly needed—and it will cause everybody to realize more fully what University life should mean.

He graduated with a bachelor's and a master's degree in 1910. In 1911, he was secretary of the Board of Visitors to the university.

=== Journalism career at The State ===
Gonzales joined The State in the summer of 1911 as a "paragrapher and editorial writer." He grew renowned for his "Colonel Aftermath" columns and "The State's Survey" (a column devoted to witty paragraphs) which he edited.

=== Military service ===
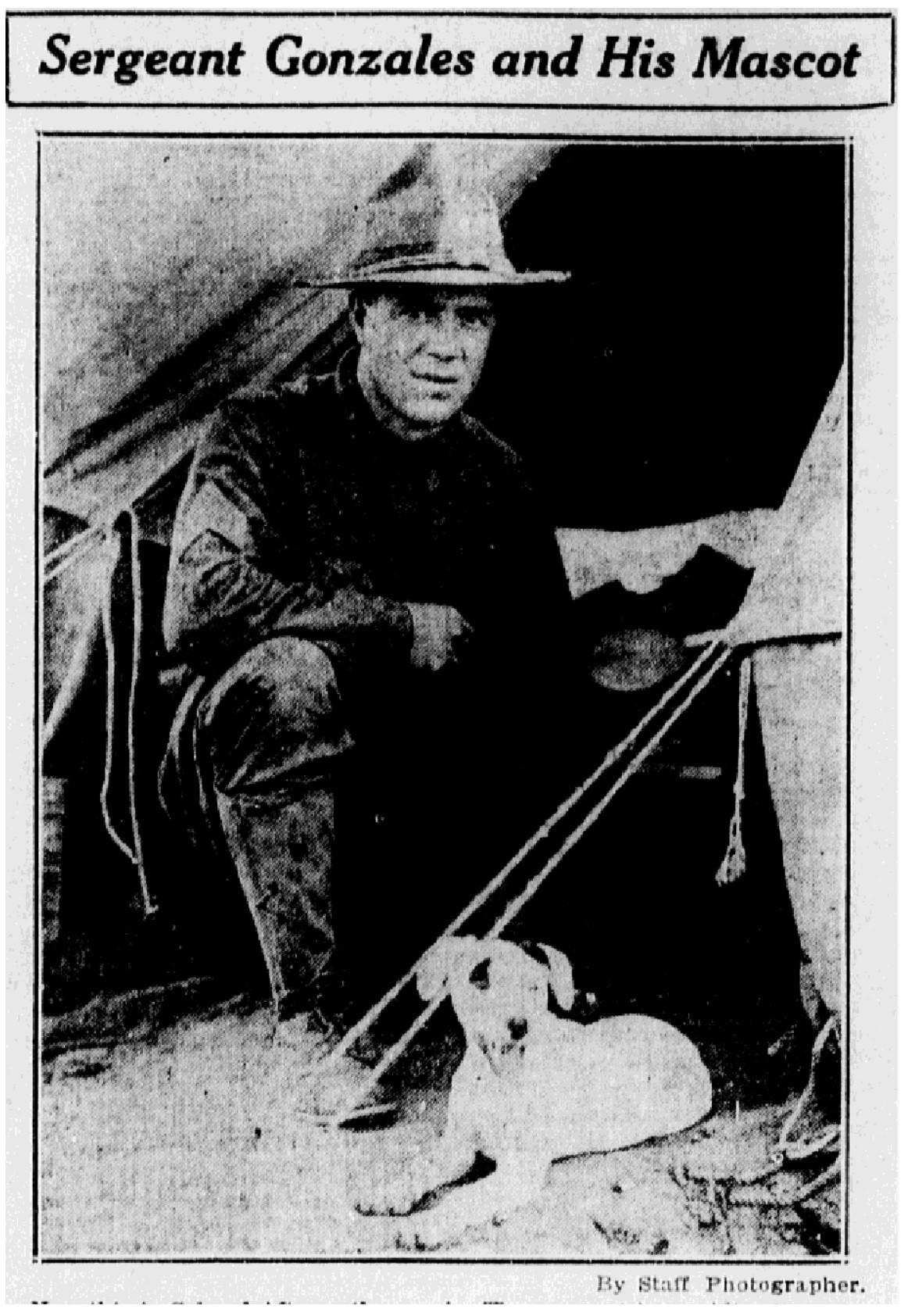
Sergeant Gonzales with his dog (nicknamed "Bob II") at Camp Moore, published by The State in July 1916.

In June 1916, Gonzales enlisted as a private in the Second South Carolina infantry; in August he was promoted to sergeant in the machine gun company. The State reported that he had "the affection and respect of his comrades in the military service." Colonel Holmes B. Springs gave Gonzales the honorary title of "regimental historian."

=== Death ===
On December 19, 1916, Gonzales died abruptly after a short battle with pneumonia. Gonzales's funeral service was hold on December 26 at Trinity Church, Columbia; he was buried in Elmwood Cemetery.

== Legacy ==
In late December 1916, mere days after Gonzales's death, The State was flooded with condolences and tributes from friends and admirers across the country.

In 1918, The State Company published Poems And Paragraphs, a posthumous collection of Gonzales's poetry and newspaper stories which also included many of the previously published tributes as well as an introduction written by Gonzales's uncle Ambrose Elliott Gonzales.

The February 5, 1932 issue of The Gamecock (the first issue of its 25th year) featured a column about Gonzales' storied career. In that same issue, his name was added to the masthead—Gonzales's mother wrote a letter-to-the-editor thanking The Gamecock for the gesture.

== Family ==
Robert's paternal grandfather was Ambrosio José Gonzales, a Cuban revolutionary general and later a colonel in the Confederate States Army during the American Civil War. His paternal uncles Ambrose Elliott Gonzales and Narciso Gener Gonzales founded The State in 1891.

== Selected Quotes ==
- "Where there's a will, there's a lawyer."
- "It seems paradoxical, but a blunt man usually comes to the point.
- "A whole lot of self-made men certainly are bum architects."
- "When money talks, nobody cares what kind of grammar it uses."
- "A man who is as honest as the day is long may need watching at night."
- "An honest man may be the noblest work of God, but a pretty girl is a mighty close second."
- "As we understand it, the surest way to make a living by the pen is to raise pigs."

== Bibliography ==
=== Books ===
- Poems And Paragraphs (The State Company, 1918)

=== Selected poems ===
- "The Haunts of Ashur"
- "Love's Return"
- "Mnemosyne"
- "A Vision of Atlantis"
- "April"
- "Avalon"
- "Calydon"
- "The Dance of the Fairies"
- "Diana's Beams"
