= William Elliott Gonzales =

American diplomat (1866–1937)

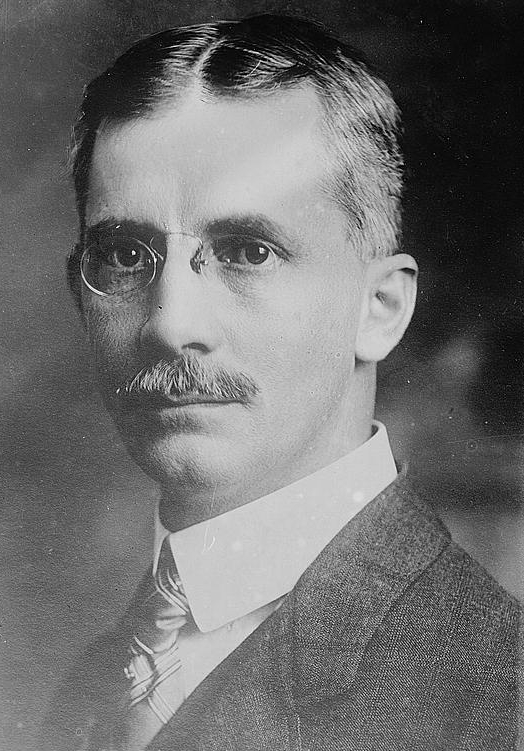

United States Ambassador to Peru
- In office April 24, 1920 – October 11, 1921
- President: Woodrow Wilson; Warren G. Harding
- Preceded by: Benton McMillin
- Succeeded by: Miles Poindexter

United States Ambassador to Cuba
- In office August 9, 1913 – December 18, 1919
- President: Woodrow Wilson
- Preceded by: Arthur M. Beaupre
- Succeeded by: Boaz W. Long

William Elliott Gonzales (1866 – October 20, 1937) was the United States Ambassador to Cuba from 1913 to 1919 and the United States Ambassador to Peru from 1919 to 1921. He was born to Ambrosio José Gonzales and Harriott Rutledge Elliott. On February 2, 1887, he married Sarah C. Shiver; they had two children, Robert E. Gonzales (1888 – 1916) and Alida Ruffini Gonzales McMaster (1906 – 1938). He served in the U.S. Army during the Spanish–American War.

Sometime between 1909 and 1912, Gonzales was the Editor of The State newspaper and used the paper's reach to help raise $11,000 in private subscriptions for the purposes of erecting the South Carolina Monument to the Women of the Confederacy. The South Carolina General Assembly appropriated another $7,500 for the monument.

He was later the United States Ambassador to Cuba from 1913 to 1919. He was the United States Ambassador to Peru from 1919 to 1921.

He died on October 20, 1937. He was buried in Elmwood Cemetery in Columbia, South Carolina. The Gonzales Fountain was erected in Arsenal Hill in his memory.

Diplomatic posts
| Preceded by Benton McMillin | United States Ambassador to Peru; 1919–1921 | Succeeded by Miles Poindexter |
