= Bob Dahl =

American football player (1968-2023)

No. 72, 75
- Positions: Guard, tackle

Personal information
- Born: November 5, 1968; Chicago, Illinois, U.S.
- Died: September 25, 2023 (aged 54); Rockbridge County, Virginia, U.S.
- Listed height: 6 ft 5 in (1.96 m)
- Listed weight: 318 lb (144 kg)

Career information
- High school: Chagrin Falls (Chagrin Falls, Ohio)
- College: Notre Dame
- NFL draft: 1991: 3rd round, 72nd overall pick

Career history
- Cincinnati Bengals (1991)*; Pittsburgh Steelers (1991)*; Cleveland Browns (1992–1995); Washington Redskins (1996–1998)
- * Offseason or practice squad member only

Career NFL statistics
- Games played: 82
- Games started: 80
- Fumble recoveries: 3
- Stats at Pro Football Reference

Robert Allen Dahl (November 5, 1968 - September 25, 2023) was an American professional football offensive lineman. He played in the National Football League (NFL) for the Cleveland Browns and Washington Redskins. He played college football for the Notre Dame Fighting Irish and was a member of the 1988 undefeated national championship team. Dahl was drafted in the third round of the 1991 NFL draft by the Cincinnati Bengals.

According to The Rockbridge Advocate monthly news magazine (October 2023, print only), Dahl died on September 25, 2023, near Fancy Hill in Rockbridge County, Virginia, from a self-inflicted gunshot.
