= 1928 United States Senate election in Washington =

- November 6, 1928
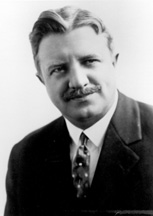

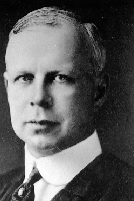
Nominee	Clarence Dill	Kenneth Mackintosh
Party	Democratic	Republican
Popular vote	261,524	227,415
Percentage	53.42%	46.45%
- County results Dill: 50–60% 60–70% 70–80% Mackintosh: 50–60%
U.S. senator before election
Clarence Dill
Democratic
Elected U.S. Senator
Clarence Dill
Democratic

The 1928 United States Senate election in Washington was held on November 6, 1928. Incumbent Democrat Clarence Dill was re-elected to a second term in office over Republican Chief justice Kenneth Mackintosh.

As of 2026, this is the last time Washington elected a U.S. Senator from east of the Cascade Mountains.

== Democratic primary ==
=== Candidates ===
- Clarence C. Dill, incumbent Senator since 1923
- James Cleveland Longstreet

=== Results ===
1928 Democratic Senate primary
Party	Candidate	Votes	%
Democratic	Clarence C. Dill (incumbent)	20,123	80.63%
Democratic	James C. Longstreet	4,833	19.37%
Total votes		24,956	100.00%

== Republican primary ==
=== Candidates ===
- Austin E. Griffiths
- Kenneth Mackintosh, Chief Justice of the Washington Supreme Court since 1918
- Miles Poindexter, U.S. Ambassador to Peru and former U.S. Senator (1911–23)

=== Results ===
1928 Republican Senate primary
Party	Candidate	Votes	%
Republican	Kenneth Mackintosh	118,664	47.72%
Republican	Miles Poindexter	83,102	33.42%
Republican	Austin E. Griffiths	46,891	18.86%
Total votes		248,657	100.00%

== General election ==
=== Results ===
1928 U.S. Senate election in Washington
Party	Candidate	Votes	%	±%
Democratic	Clarence C. Dill (incumbent)	261,524	53.42%	▲9.15
Republican	Kenneth Mackintosh	227,415	46.45%	▲3.52
Communist	Alex Noral	666	0.14%	▼0.02
Total votes		496,688	100.00%	
Democratic hold		Swing		

== See also ==
- 1928 United States Senate elections
