= John William Thurmond =

American politician and lawyer (1862–1934)

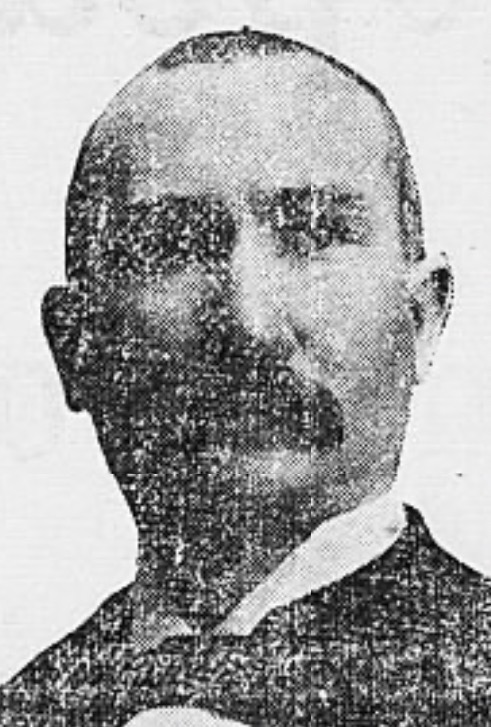

Member of the South Carolina House of Representatives
- In office November 17, 1894 – March 7, 1896

United States Attorney of the Western District of South Carolina
- In office April 2, 1915 – 1921
- Preceded by: Office established

Acting Associate Justice of the South Carolina Supreme Court

Personal details
- Born: May 1, 1862 Morgana, South Carolina, US
- Died: June 17, 1934 (aged 72) Edgefield, South Carolina, US
- Party: Democratic
- Children: 6, including Strom
- Occupation: Politician, lawyer

John William Thurmond (May 1, 1862 – June 17, 1934) was an American politician and lawyer. A Democrat, he was a member of the South Carolina House of Representatives and was an acting Justice of the South Carolina Supreme Court. He was the father of Strom Thurmond.

== Early life and education ==
Thurmond was born on May 1, 1862, in Morgana, South Carolina, a settlement in Meriwether Township, Edgefield County. He was the son of George Washington Thurmond and Mary Jane (née Felter) Thurmond. Educated at common schools, he studied at the University of South Carolina for one year; he was posthumnously awarded an honorary Doctor of Laws by the University in 1934, upon news of his death.

== Career ==
Thurmond then worked as a schoolteacher and read law under the Sheppard brothers, and in January 1888, was admitted to the bar. He practiced law in Edgefield County. In 1888, he was elected district attorney of Edgefield County, and in 1893, was made the county's registration supervisor. He also helped bring Edgefield its first hospital and hotel.

Thurmond was a Democrat. He was a member of the South Carolina House of Representatives, from November 17, 1894, to March 7, 1896, during which he served as receiver of the State Bank of South Carolina. He was an unsuccessful candidate in the 1902 United States House of Representatives election in South Carolina. He was president of the 1906 South Carolina Democratic Convention. Ideologically, he was described as a "leader of the Tillman movement" in an obituary.

From 1896 to 1904, Thurmond was solicitor of the 5th South Carolina District Court, as which he participated in the murder trial against James H. Tillman. He was a United States Attorney of the newly-formed United States District Court for the Western District of South Carolina, from April 2, 1915 to 1921, having been appointed by President Woodrow Wilson.

Thurmond served as a special circuit judge and as an acting Associate Justice of the South Carolina Supreme Court, on occasions where judges were not present, though no dates of his tenures were recorded. He was in a law partnership with Carroll Johnson Ramage from 1904, to 1923 or 1924. Afterward, he associated with his son Strom in law practice, officially partnerhing in 1930. In 1930, he published Thurmond's Key Cases, a collection of South Carolina Supreme Court case descriptions.

== Personal life and death ==
On December 28, 1898, Thurmond married Eleanor Gertrude Strom, with whom he had six children, including Strom. He was Baptist, as well as a member of the Knights of Pythias and the Woodmen of the World. On March 24, 1897, he killed W. G. Harris, a man from Edgefield, in self-defense. He died on June 17, 1934, aged 72, in Edgefield.
