= Robert B. Scarborough =

American politician (1861–1927)

Robert Bethea Scarborough
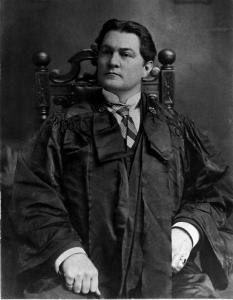

Member of the U.S. House of Representatives from South Carolina's 6th district
- In office March 4, 1901 – March 3, 1905
- Preceded by: James Norton
- Succeeded by: J. Edwin Ellerbe

63rd Lieutenant Governor of South Carolina
- In office June 2, 1899 – January 15, 1901
- Governor: Miles Benjamin McSweeney
- Preceded by: Miles Benjamin McSweeney
- Succeeded by: James H. Tillman

President Pro Tempore of the South Carolina State Senate
- In office 1898–1899

Member of the South Carolina State Senate
- In office 1897–1899

Personal details
- Born: October 29, 1861 Chesterfield, South Carolina, Confederate States
- Died: November 23, 1927 (aged 66) Conway, South Carolina, United States
- Party: Democratic
- Profession: Teacher, lawyer, politician

Robert Bethea Scarborough (October 29, 1861 – November 23, 1927) was a U.S. representative from South Carolina.

== Biography ==
Born in Chesterfield, South Carolina on October 29, 1861, about a year after the state had declared its secession to join the Confederate States, Scarborough attended the common schools and Mullins (South Carolina) Academy. He taught school and studied law. Scarborough was admitted to the bar in 1884 and commenced practice in Conway, South Carolina. He was a county attorney of Horry County 1885-1893 and served as clerk of the county board 1885-1890. He served as member of the South Carolina State senate in 1897 and 1898 and was elected president pro tempore in 1898. He served as the 63rd lieutenant governor of South Carolina in 1899.

Scarborough was elected as a Democrat to the Fifty-seventh and Fifty-eighth Congresses (March 4, 1901 – March 3, 1905). He declined to be a candidate for renomination in 1904 to the Fifty-ninth Congress. He resumed the practice of law in Conway, South Carolina, and was also interested in banking. He served as chairman of the board of regents of the South Carolina State Hospital.

He died in Conway, South Carolina, on November 23, 1927, and was buried in Lake Side Cemetery.

Political offices
Preceded by Miles Benjamin McSweeney	Lieutenant Governor of South Carolina; 1899–1901	Succeeded by James Tillman
U.S. House of Representatives
Preceded by James Norton	Member of the U.S. House of Representatives from South Carolina's 6th congressional district 1901–1905	Succeeded by J. Edwin Ellerbe
