= 1940 Washington gubernatorial election =

- November 5, 1940
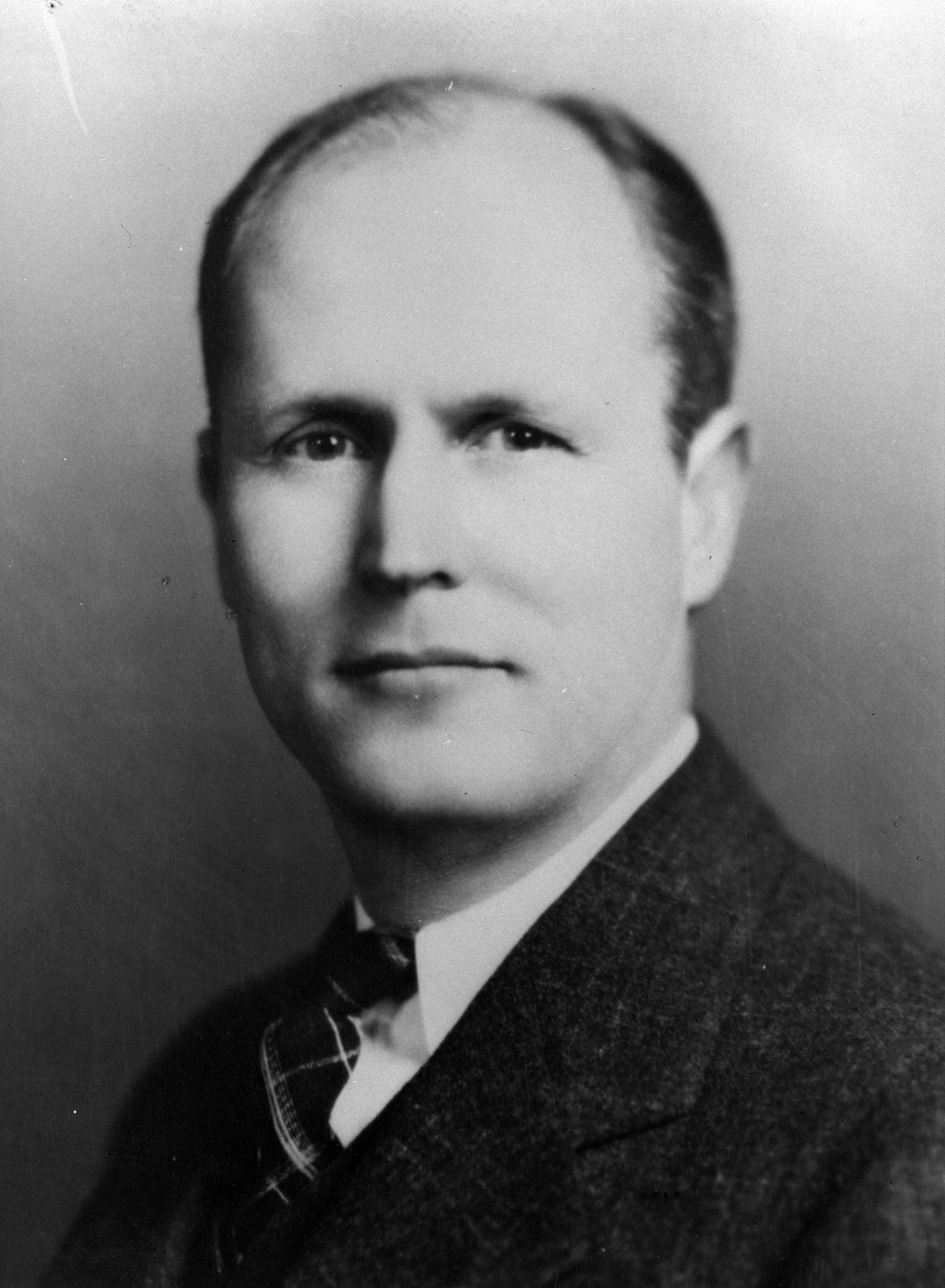

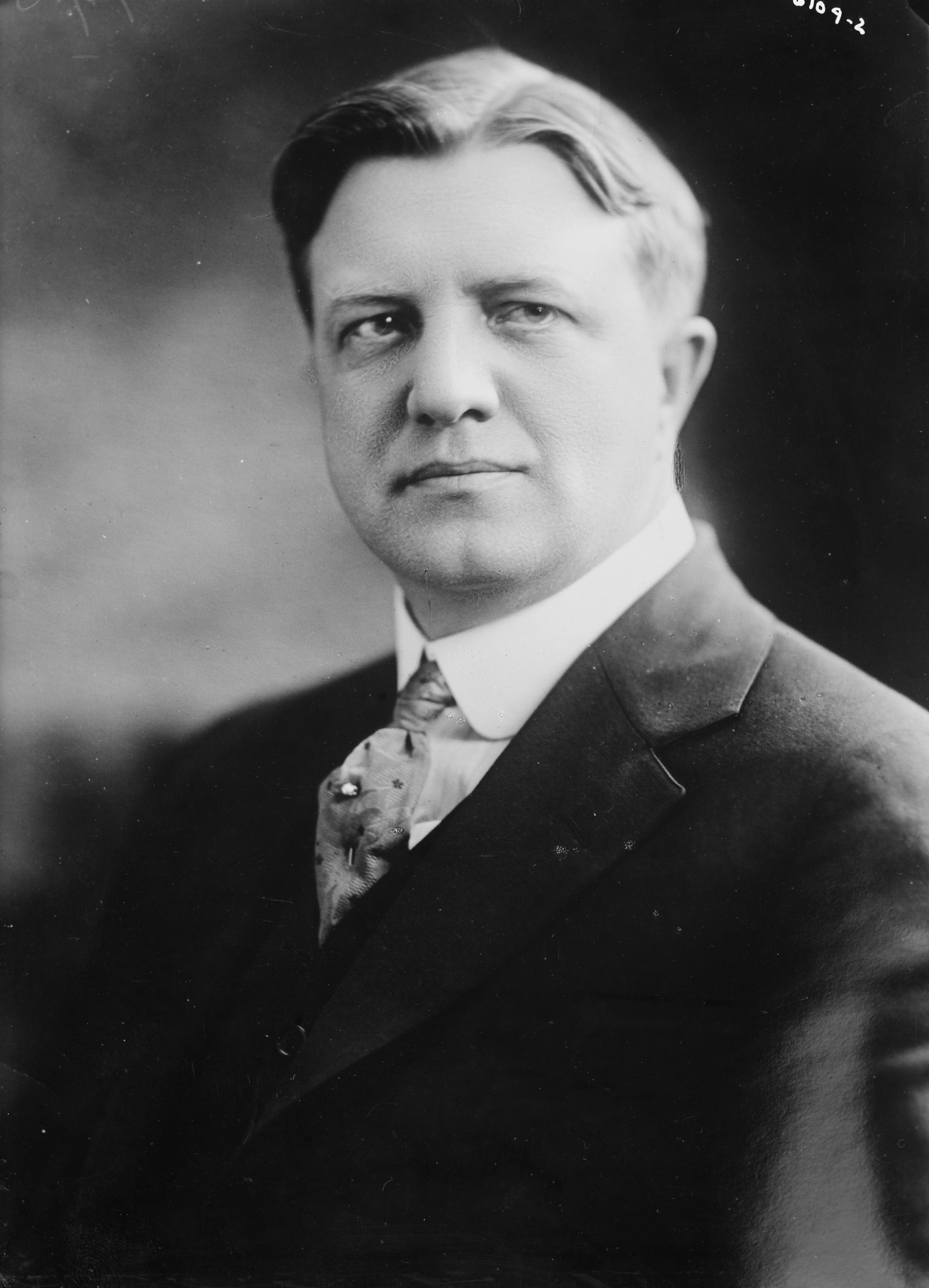
Nominee	Arthur B. Langlie	Clarence Dill
Party	Republican	Democratic
Popular vote	392,522	386,706
Percentage	50.24%	49.49%
- County results Langlie: 50–60% 60–70% 70–80% Dill: 50–60% 60–70%
Governor before election
Clarence D. Martin
Democratic
Elected Governor
Arthur B. Langlie
Republican

The 1940 Washington gubernatorial election was held on November 5, 1940. Republican nominee Arthur B. Langlie narrowly defeated Democratic nominee Clarence Dill with 50.24% of the vote. Langlie's 0.74% margin of victory is the third-closest in state history. (Note: After 2004 and 1912) This is the only gubernatorial election in Washington in which King County has voted for the losing candidate.

== Primary election ==
The primary election was held on September 10, 1940. At the time, Washington used a blanket primary for nominations, with all candidates appearing on the same ballot and the highest candidate for each party being nominated. Incumbent governor Clarence D. Martin lost the Democratic nomination.

=== Candidates ===
- Frank Burns (R)
- Clarence Dill (D), former United States Senator
- Alexander Gabrielsen (D)
- George H. Gannon (D)
- J. Warren Kinney (R)
- Arthur B. Langlie (R), incumbent Mayor of Seattle
- George Dana Linn (R)
- Clarence D. Martin (D), incumbent Governor
- Marius Rasmussen (R)
- Tom Smith (D)

=== Results ===
Blanket primary results
Party	Candidate	Votes	%
Democratic	Clarence Dill	186,008	34.63%
Republican	Arthur B. Langlie	160,551	29.89%
Democratic	Clarence D. Martin (incumbent)	114,484	21.31%
Democratic	Tom Smith	26,572	4.95%
Democratic	George H. Gannon	24,299	4.52%
Republican	Frank Burns	12,967	2.41%
Republican	J. Warren Kinney	6,134	1.14%
Republican	Alexander Gabrielsen	2,647	0.49%
Republican	Marius Rasmussen	1,932	0.36%
Republican	George Dana Linn	1,597	0.30%
Total votes		537,191	100.00%

== General election ==
=== Candidates ===
Major party candidates

- Arthur B. Langlie, Republican
- Clarence Dill, Democratic

Other candidates

- John Brockway, Communist
- P. J. Ater, Socialist Labor

=== Results ===
1940 Washington gubernatorial election
Party	Candidate	Votes	%	±%
Republican	Arthur B. Langlie	392,522	50.24%	+22.12%
Democratic	Clarence Dill	386,706	49.49%	−19.87%
Communist	John Brockway	1,674	0.21%	−0.07%
Socialist Labor	P. J. Ater	426	0.06%	−0.01%
Majority		5,816	0.74%	
Total votes		781,328	100.00%	
Republican gain from Democratic		Swing	+41.99%	

=== Results by county ===
County	Arthur B. Langlie Republican		Clarence Dill Democratic		John Brockway Communist		P. J. Ater Socialist Labor		Margin		Total votes cast
County	#	%	#	%	#	%	#	%	#	%	Total votes cast
Adams	1,858	64.25%	1,034	35.75%	0	0.00%	0	0.00%	824	28.49%	2,892
Asotin	1,881	53.42%	1,640	46.58%	0	0.00%	0	0.00%	241	6.84%	3,521
Benton	3,017	59.30%	2,069	40.66%	2	0.04%	0	0.00%	948	18.63%	5,088
Chelan	9,919	65.16%	5,301	34.82%	2	0.01%	1	0.01%	4,618	30.34%	15,223
Clallam	4,520	47.50%	4,958	52.11%	31	0.33%	6	0.06%	-438	-4.60%	9,515
Clark	10,788	50.24%	10,641	49.56%	17	0.08%	27	0.13%	147	0.68%	21,473
Columbia	1,831	68.22%	852	31.74%	1	0.04%	0	0.00%	979	36.48%	2,684
Cowlitz	8,461	48.09%	9,070	51.55%	31	0.18%	32	0.18%	-609	-3.46%	17,594
Douglas	2,444	61.65%	1,519	38.32%	1	0.03%	0	0.00%	925	23.34%	3,964
Ferry	574	31.52%	1,246	68.42%	0	0.00%	1	0.05%	-672	-36.90%	1,821
Franklin	1,451	49.34%	1,486	50.53%	4	0.14%	0	0.00%	-35	-1.19%	2,941
Garfield	1,242	72.84%	463	27.16%	0	0.00%	0	0.00%	779	45.69%	1,705
Grant	2,154	39.49%	3,298	60.46%	0	0.00%	3	0.05%	-1,144	-20.97%	5,455
Grays Harbor	11,008	47.51%	12,094	52.20%	50	0.22%	18	0.08%	-1,086	-4.69%	23,170
Island	1,629	53.90%	1,389	45.96%	3	0.10%	1	0.03%	240	7.94%	3,022
Jefferson	1,891	52.25%	1,725	47.67%	2	0.06%	1	0.03%	166	4.59%	3,619
King	114,296	48.38%	121,013	51.22%	792	0.34%	139	0.06%	-6,717	-2.84%	236,240
Kitsap	8,860	45.94%	10,394	53.89%	24	0.12%	9	0.05%	-1,534	-7.95%	19,287
Kittitas	4,348	50.51%	4,251	49.38%	7	0.08%	2	0.02%	97	1.13%	8,608
Klickitat	2,351	50.56%	2,292	49.29%	0	0.00%	7	0.15%	59	1.27%	4,650
Lewis	10,219	54.77%	8,408	45.06%	26	0.14%	5	0.03%	1,811	9.71%	18,658
Lincoln	3,200	57.48%	2,367	42.52%	0	0.00%	0	0.00%	833	14.96%	5,567
Mason	2,558	49.18%	2,602	50.03%	39	0.75%	2	0.04%	-44	-0.85%	5,201
Okanogan	5,019	53.00%	4,449	46.98%	1	0.01%	0	0.00%	570	6.02%	9,469
Pacific	3,421	49.51%	3,474	50.27%	14	0.20%	1	0.01%	-53	-0.77%	6,910
Pend Oreille	1,368	44.85%	1,682	55.15%	0	0.00%	0	0.00%	-314	-10.30%	3,050
Pierce	33,726	42.76%	44,870	56.89%	207	0.26%	71	0.09%	-11,144	-14.13%	78,874
San Juan	871	52.88%	776	47.12%	0	0.00%	0	0.00%	95	5.77%	1,647
Skagit	9,909	55.48%	7,920	44.34%	28	0.16%	5	0.03%	1,989	11.14%	17,862
Skamania	889	43.69%	1,146	56.31%	0	0.00%	0	0.00%	-257	-12.63%	2,035
Snohomish	18,458	46.09%	21,412	53.47%	144	0.36%	34	0.08%	2,954	7.38%	40,048
Spokane	38,393	48.98%	39,901	50.90%	51	0.07%	41	0.05%	-1,508	-1.92%	78,386
Stevens	3,595	44.26%	4,527	55.73%	0	0.00%	1	0.01%	-932	-11.47%	8,123
Thurston	9,558	51.66%	8,912	48.17%	28	0.15%	2	0.01%	646	3.49%	18,500
Wahkiakum	924	51.97%	844	47.47%	7	0.39%	3	0.17%	80	4.50%	1,778
Walla Walla	9,227	67.81%	4,376	32.16%	2	0.01%	2	0.01%	4,851	35.65%	13,607
Whatcom	15,762	56.00%	12,256	43.54%	122	0.43%	7	0.02%	3,506	12.46%	28,147
Whitman	8,368	65.82%	4,340	34.14%	4	0.03%	1	0.01%	4,028	31.68%	12,713
Yakima	22,534	58.86%	15,709	41.04%	34	0.09%	4	0.01%	6,825	17.83%	38,281
Totals	392,522	50.24%	386,706	49.49%	1,674	0.21%	426	0.05%	5,816	0.74%	781,328

==== Counties that flipped from Democratic to Republican ====
- Adams
- Asotin
- Benton
- Chelan
- Clark
- Columbia
- Douglas
- Garfield
- Island
- Jefferson
- Kittitas
- Klickitat
- Lewis
- Lincoln
- Okanogan
- San Juan
- Skagit
- Thurston
- Wahkiakum
- Walla Walla
- Whatcom
- Whitman
- Yakima
