= Narciso Gener Gonzales =

American journalist (1858–1903)

Narciso Gonzales
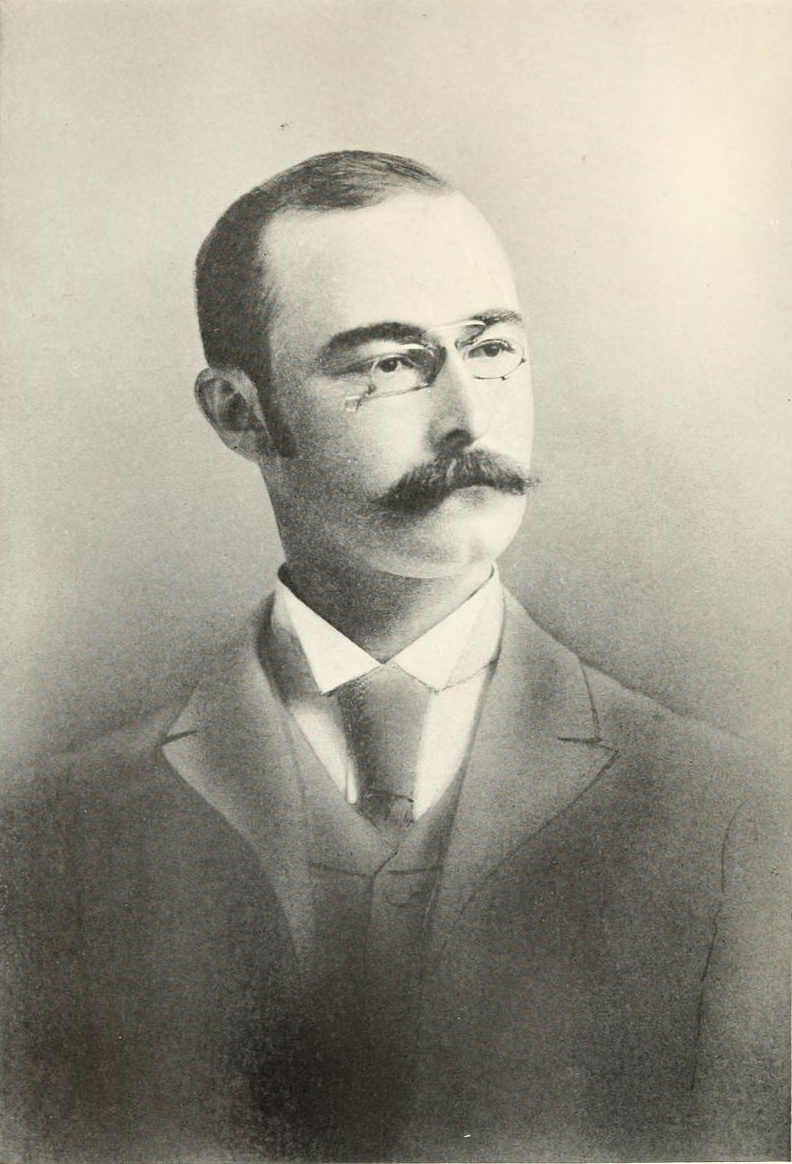
- Born: August 5, 1858; Edisto Island, South Carolina, U.S.
- Died: January 19, 1903 (aged 44); Columbia, South Carolina, U.S.
- Occupation: Newspaper editor

Narciso Gener Gonzales (August 5, 1858 – January 19, 1903) was an American journalist born in Eddingsville, Edisto Island, South Carolina. He founded The State newspaper in Columbia, South Carolina, with his brother, Ambrose E. Gonzales in 1891. Gonzales was a frequent critic of Tillmanism. He was also a Democratic powerbroker in the state, directing patronage from the second Cleveland administration within South Carolina. Gonzales was murdered in 1903 by South Carolina Lieutenant Governor James H. Tillman, the nephew of Senator Ben Tillman, after Gonzales effectively ended James Tillman's chances of becoming governor with a series of scathing editorials.

== Early life and family ==
Gonzales was the son of Confederate Colonel Ambrosio José Gonzales and Harriet Rutledge Elliott. His father played an instrumental role in the defenses of South Carolina during the American Civil War after he had been a Cuban revolutionary leader with Venezuelan General Narciso López, who opposed the oppressive Spanish rule in four failed expeditions. His mother was the daughter of a wealthy South Carolina rice planter, state senator, and writer, William Elliott. Gonzales was an uncle of Robert E. Gonzales.

Although his formal education ended at 17, he became a telegraph operator in 1875 to help support his extended family. He worked in railroad depots in Varnville, South Carolina, as well as Savannah and Valdosta in Georgia. While he was a telegrapher and handled news reports, he developed an interest in journalism and state politics.

== Journalism career ==
=== Joining the News and Courier ===
While Gonzales worked in Varnville in 1876, he wrote a report on a local uprising of plantation workers and telegraphed it to the Charleston Journal of Commerce. The report came to the attention of the editors of a rival newspaper, the News and Courier. Shortly after going to work for the Greenville Daily News in 1880, Gonzales accepted a position as the state capital correspondent for the News and Courier. While employed by the News and Courier, Gonzales extensively covered the rise of Ben Tillman, a white supremacist who led a populist revolt against the state's political establishment.

=== Founding The State ===
In 1891, Gonzales and his brother Ambrose E. Gonzales founded The State, a newspaper in Columbia, South Carolina. Owning his own newspaper allowed the well-known Gonzales to wage war against Governor Ben Tillman unrestrained by the conservatism of his former employer. Although Gonzales and Tillman shared similar prejudices, they differed in their comportment. Whereas Tillman utilized the politics of violence, Gonzales railed against dueling, murder, and lynching. Ultimately, while Tillman respected the newly created newspaper for its audacity, he successfully painted the paper as anti-populist during the 1892 gubernatorial election.

Gonzales was a political powerbroker. Tillman was unable to persuade President Grover Cleveland to stop directing state patronage through Gonzales and another man; to the detriment of Tillman. And in 1898, Governor Ellerbe made a deal with Gonzales, who opposed prohibition and the state-run dispensary system, that in return for Gonzales support in the election, Ellerbe would abandon the dispensary system. For the promise, which Ellerbe ultimately broke, Gonzales allegedly returned 2,600 votes.

During Gonzales's life, The State supported a number of progressive causes; its editorials called for an end to lynching, the reform of child labor laws, and women's suffrage.

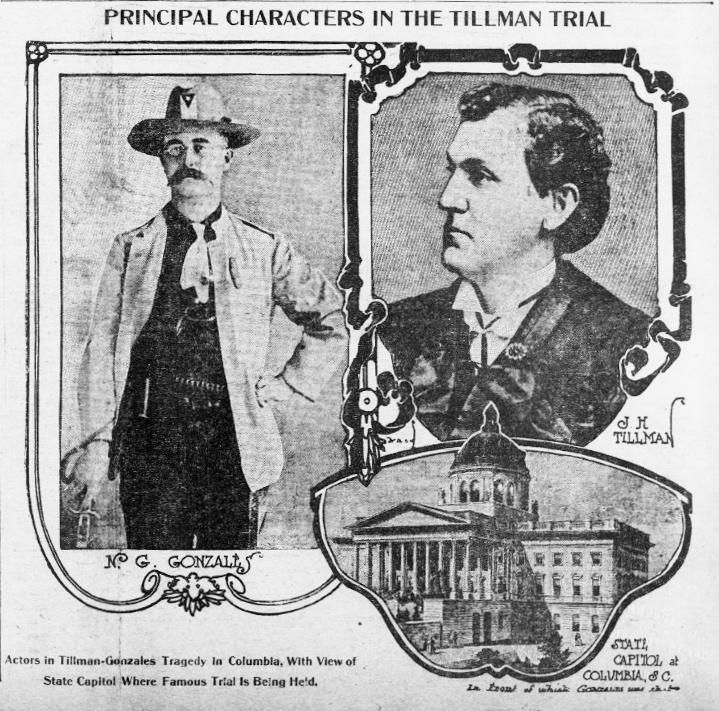
Gonzales, Tillman

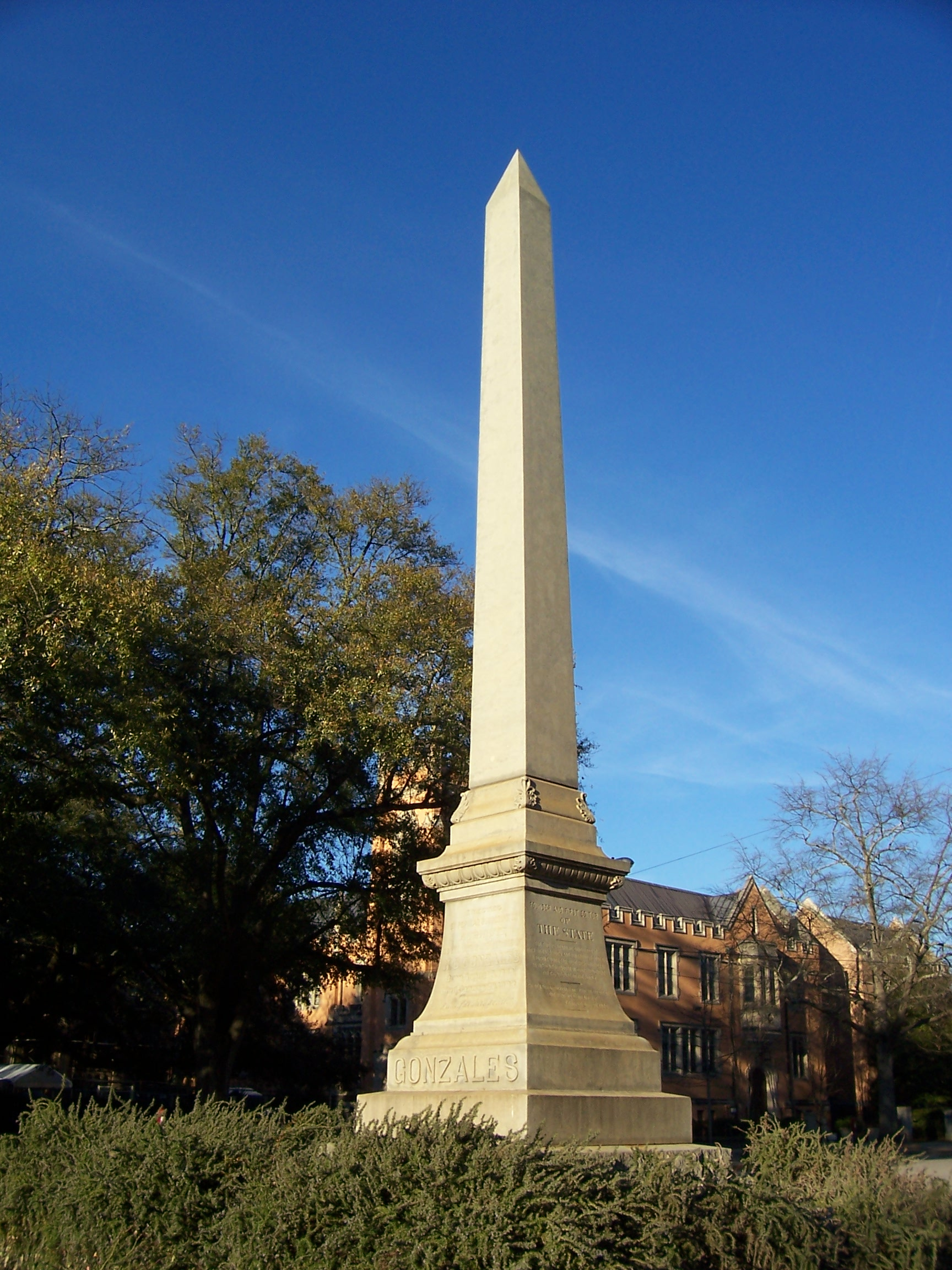
Obelisk honoring Gonzales near the South Carolina State House

== Death ==
Gonzales was shot on January 15, 1903, by South Carolina Lieutenant Governor James H. Tillman, the nephew of Ben Tillman, and died four days later. Gonzales had waged a veritable crusade against Tillman's personal failings in his newspaper that helped to ensure Tillman's defeat in the 1902 South Carolina gubernatorial race. Tillman had shot Gonzales in broad daylight in the presence of many eyewitnesses but was acquitted, ostensibly on a shaky self-defense theory but really because the jury believed Tillman to have been right in taking justice into his own hands. The assassination effectively ended Jim Tillman's political future and provided an opening for Coleman Livingston Blease to become the next political leader in the state.

=== Legacy ===
A memorial cenotaph for Gonzales was later erected on Senate Street across from the State House in Columbia, purportedly on the route on which Tillman regularly walked home.

== See also ==
- List of journalists killed in the United States
