= 1922 United States Senate election in Washington =

- November 7, 1922
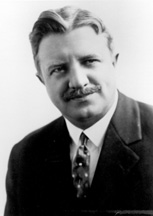

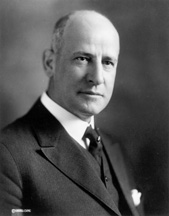

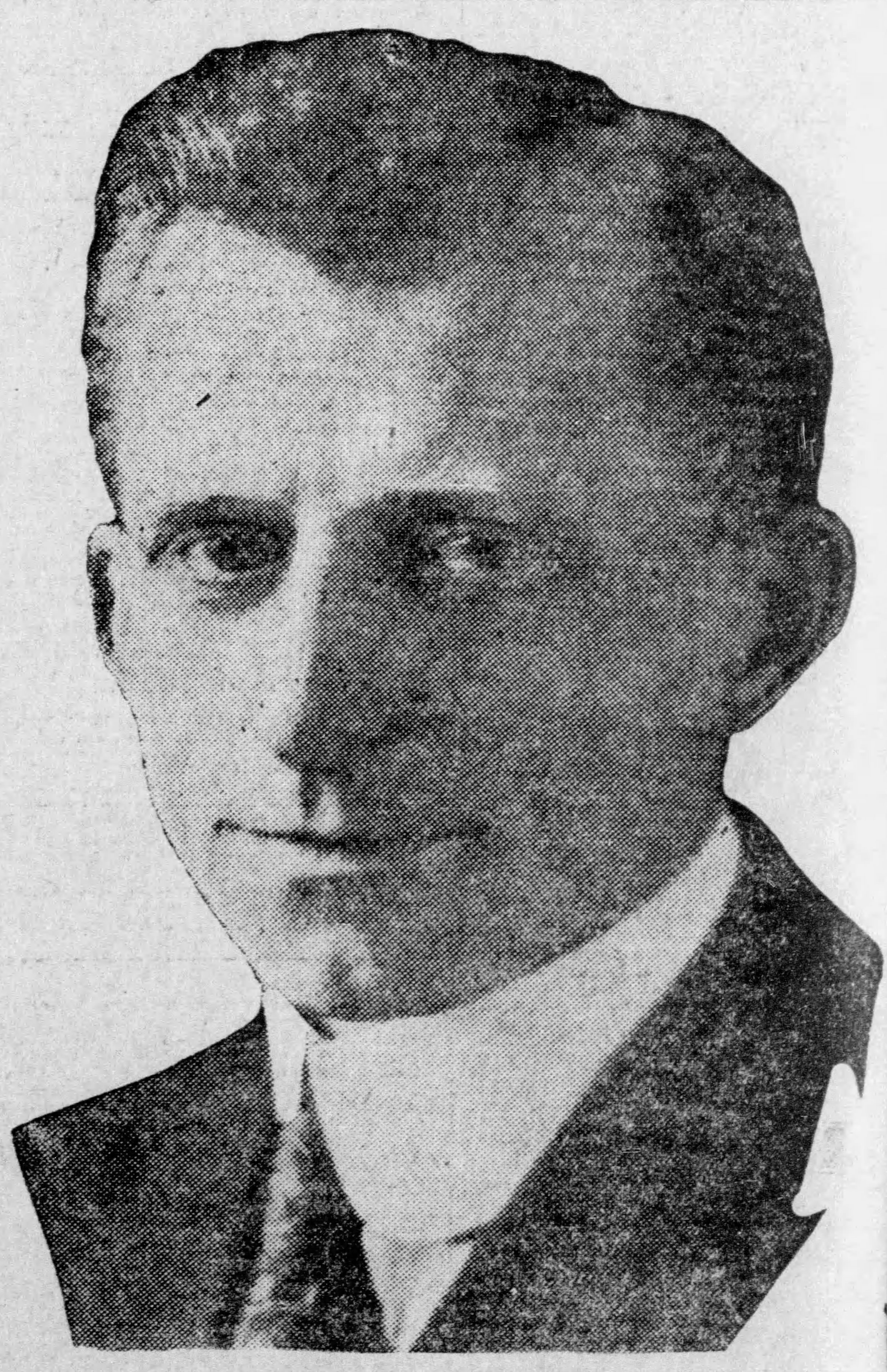
Nominee	Clarence Dill	Miles Poindexter	James A. Duncan
Party	Democratic	Republican	Farmer–Labor
Popular vote	130,347	126,410	35,326
Percentage	44.27%	42.93%	12.00%
- County results Dill: 40–50% 50–60% 60–70% Poindexter: 30–40% 40–50% 50–60% 60–70%
U.S. senator before election
Miles Poindexter
Republican
Elected U.S. Senator
Clarence C. Dill
Democratic

The 1922 United States Senate election in Washington was held on November 7, 1922. Incumbent Republican Miles Poindexter ran for a third term in office, but was defeated by Democrat Clarence C. Dill in a three-way race that also featured Farmer-Labor nominee James Duncan.

== Republican primary ==
=== Candidates ===
- Frances Cleveland Axtell, former state representative from Bellingham
- Austin E. Griffiths, former Seattle City Councilman (1910–1913) and candidate for mayor in 1916
- George B. Lamping, state senator and candidate for governor in 1920
- Miles Poindexter, incumbent U.S. Senator since 1911
- George H. Stevenson
- Lee Tittle

=== Results ===
1922 Republican Senate primary
Party	Candidate	Votes	%
Republican	Miles Poindexter (incumbent)	84,695	43.05%
Republican	George B. Lamping	56,189	28.56%
Republican	Frances Cleveland Axtell	23,555	11.97%
Republican	Austin E. Griffiths	23,257	11.82%
Republican	George H. Stevenson	6,637	3.37%
Republican	Lee Tittle	2,419	1.23%
Total votes		196,752	100.00%

== Democratic primary ==
=== Candidates ===
- Clarence C. Dill, U.S. Representative from Spokane
- James Cleveland Longstreet
- Lyman Seelye

=== Results ===
1922 Democratic Senate primary
Party	Candidate	Votes	%
Democratic	Clarence C. Dill	10,528	70.23%
Democratic	James C. Longstreet	2,633	17.56%
Democratic	Lyman Seelye	1,830	12.21%
Total votes		14,991	100.00%

== Farmer-Labor primary ==
=== Candidates ===
- James A. Duncan, candidate for U.S. Representative and Mayor of Seattle in 1920

=== Results ===
Duncan was unopposed for the Farmer-Labor nomination.

1922 Farmer-Labor Senate primary
Party	Candidate	Votes	%
Farmer–Labor	James A. Duncan	6,817	100.00%
Total votes		6,817	100.00%

== General election ==
=== Results ===
1922 U.S. Senate election in Washington
Party	Candidate	Votes	%	±%
Democratic	Clarence C. Dill	130,347	44.27%	▲7.21
Republican	Miles Poindexter (incumbent)	126,410	42.93%	▼12.46
Farmer–Labor	James A. Duncan	35,326	12.00%	N/A
Socialist Labor	David Burgess	1,904	0.65%	N/A
Communist	Frans Bostrom	482	0.16%	N/A
Total votes		294,469	100.00%	
Democratic gain from Republican		Swing		

== See also ==
- 1922 United States Senate elections
