= Miles Poindexter =

American politician (1868–1946)

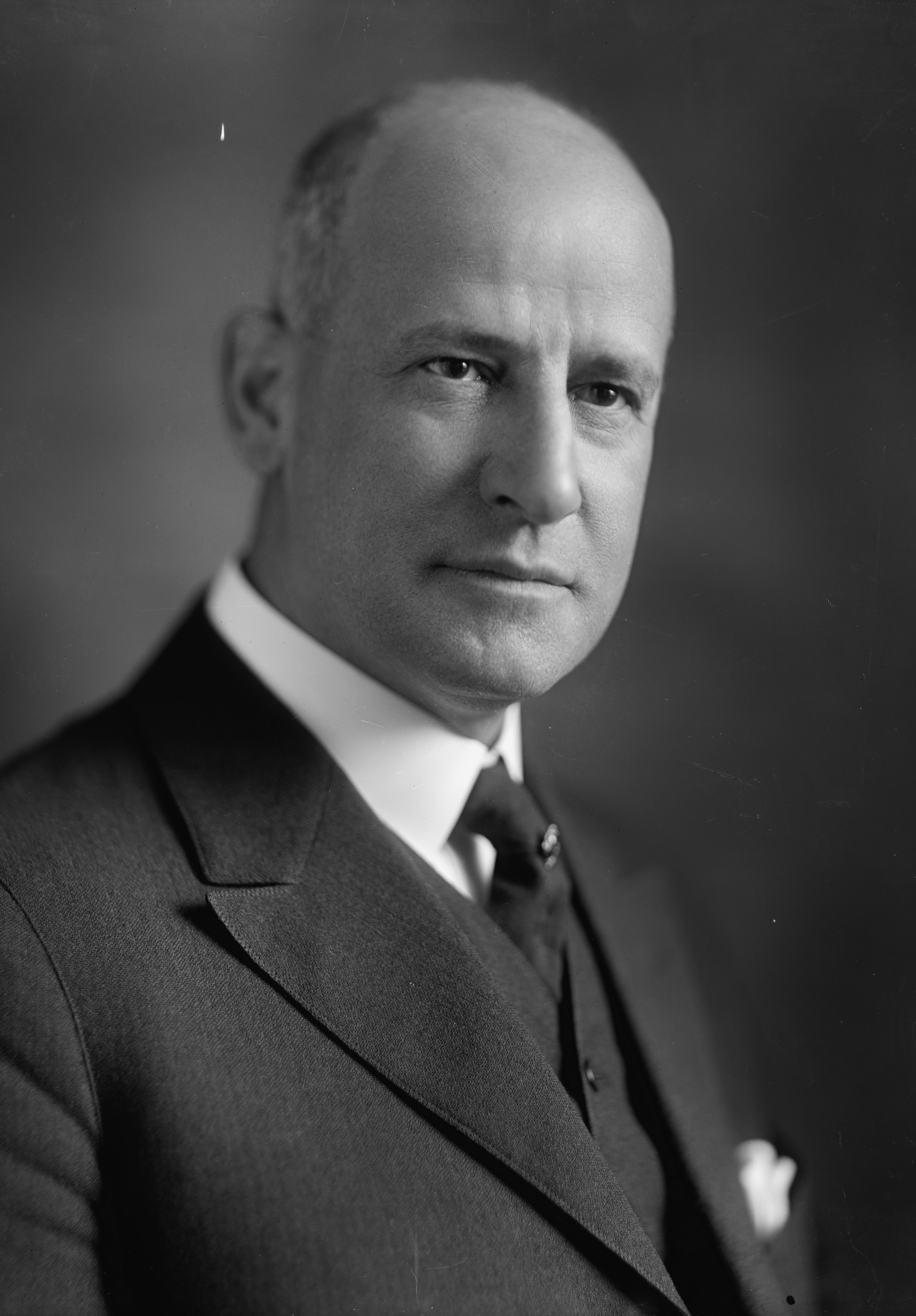
- Poindexter, 1905–1945

United States Ambassador to Peru
- In office April 20, 1923 – March 21, 1928
- President: Warren G. Harding; Calvin Coolidge
- Preceded by: William E. Gonzales
- Succeeded by: Alexander P. Moore

United States Senator from Washington
- In office March 4, 1911 – March 3, 1923
- Preceded by: Samuel H. Piles
- Succeeded by: Clarence Dill

Member of the U.S. House of Representatives from Washington's 3rd district
- In office March 4, 1909 – March 3, 1911
- Preceded by: District created
- Succeeded by: William La Follette

Personal details
- Born: April 22, 1868 Memphis, Tennessee, US
- Died: September 21, 1946 (aged 78) Rockbridge County, Virginia, US
- Resting place: Fairmount Memorial Park, Spokane, Washington
- Party: Republican
- Other political affiliations: Progressive (1913–1915)
- Spouse(s): Elizabeth Gale Page (m. 1892; died 1929) Elinor Jackson Junkin Latane (m. 1936)
- Children: 1
- Education: Washington and Lee University
- Profession: Attorney
- Miles Poindexter's voice Miles Poindexter‘s “Criminal Enemies of Social Order” speech (recorded 1920)

Miles Poindexter (April 22, 1868 – September 21, 1946) was an American lawyer, politician and diplomat. As a Republican and briefly a Progressive, he served one term as a United States representative from 1909 to 1911, and two terms as a United States senator from 1911 to 1923, representing the state of Washington. Poindexter also served as United States Ambassador to Peru during the presidential administrations of Warren Harding and Calvin Coolidge.

== Early life ==
Poindexter was born in Memphis, Tennessee, the son of Josephine (Anderson) Poindexter and William B. Poindexter. His parents were residents of Malvern Hill in Henrico County, Virginia, and his father was an American Civil War veteran of the Confederate States Army. Poindexter was raised in Virginia, and attended the Fancy Hill Academy in Rockbridge County, Virginia. He then attended Washington and Lee University in Lexington, Virginia, from which he graduated with an LL.B. degree in 1891.

== Legal career ==
After he graduated, Poindexter settled in Walla Walla, Washington, where he was admitted to the bar and began the practice of law. In 1892 he became the prosecuting attorney of Walla Walla County. He moved to Spokane, Washington in 1897 where he continued the practice of law. He served as the assistant prosecuting attorney for Spokane County from 1898 to 1904, and as a judge of the superior court from 1904 to 1908.

== Political career ==
He was elected as a Republican to the Sixty-first Congress, and served from March 4, 1909, to March 3, 1911, representing Washington's newly created 3rd congressional district. He was reelected in 1910, but resigned in 1911 because the Washington State Legislature elected him to the U.S. Senate. He was reelected in 1916, and served from March 4, 1911, to March 3, 1923. Poindexter left the Republican Party in 1913 to join the Progressive Party, rejoining the Republicans in 1915.

During World War I, Poindexter moved away from supporting progressive causes and led several efforts that questioned the patriotism of German-Americans and attempted to keep them from wartime leadership positions in the military. In a highly publicized instance, Poindexter accused German-born Colonel Carl Reichmann (1859–1937), a distinguished Army officer who had served since 1881, of being pro-German and used the legislative process to block Reichmann's promotion to brigadier general. Reichmann had become a US citizen in 1887 and the promotion was supported by American Expeditionary Forces commander John J. Pershing, Hugh L. Scott, the Army Chief of Staff, and Newton D. Baker, the Secretary of War, but they were unable to overcome Poindexter's opposition and Reichmann remained a colonel. Poindexter also played a role in instigating the First Red Scare by accusing the Wilson administration of being infested with Bolshevism and accusing United States Supreme Court Associate Justice Louis Brandeis of being a communist. Poindexter was a target of reformers and progressives in 1922, and lost his bid for reelection to the Democratic nominee, Representative Clarence Dill.

== Committee chairmanships ==
During his Senate tenure, Poindexter served as chairman of the following committees:

- United States Senate Committee on Expenditures in the Interior Department (Sixty-second Congress)
- United States Senate Committee on Mines and Mining (Sixty-second Congress, Sixty-sixth Congress and Sixty-seventh Congress)
- United States Senate Committee on Pacific Islands and Puerto Rico (Sixty-second Congress)
- United States Senate Committee on Expenditures in the War Department (Sixty-third Congress and Sixty-fourth Congress)
- United States Senate Committee on Indian Depredations (Sixty-fifth Congress)

== Later life ==
Poindexter ran in the 1920 Republican Party presidential primaries, but was not a serious contender for the party's nomination. He received the votes of 20 delegates on the first ballot at the 1920 Republican National Convention, and the nomination went to Warren G. Harding on the 10th ballot.

=== Diplomat ===
After he lost his 1922 campaign for reelection to the Senate, in 1923 Harding appointed Poindexter as United States Ambassador to Peru. He served until 1928, when he resigned and returned to Washington. He was an unsuccessful candidate that year for the United States Senate.

== Retirement and death ==
After the death of his first wife, Poindexter returned to his home, "Elk Cliff" in Greenlee, near Natural Bridge Station, Virginia. He died there on September 21, 1946, and was buried at Fairmount Memorial Park in Spokane.

== Family ==
In 1892, Poindexter married Elizabeth Gale Page (1866–1929) of Walla Walla. They were the parents of a son, Gale Aylett Poindexter (1893–1976). Elizabeth Gale Page was the granddaughter of Joseph Gale, an executive of the Provisional Government of Oregon. She and Miles Poindexter were the aunt and uncle of actress Gale Page.

Poindexter remarried in 1936, becoming the husband of Elinor Jackson Junkin Latane, the widow of John Holladay Latane, a professor at Johns Hopkins University.

== See also ==
- List of United States senators who switched parties

== Sources ==
=== Books ===
- Durham, Nelson Wayne (1912). History of the City of Spokane and Spokane County, Washington. Vol. II. Spokane, WA: S. J. Clarke Publishing Company.
- Langland, James (1921). The Chicago Daily News Almanac and Year Book for 1921. Chicago, IL: Chicago Daily News Company.
- U.S. Congress (2005). Biographical Directory of the United States Congress, 1774-2005. Washington, DC: U.S. Government Printing Office. ISBN 978-0-16-073176-1.

=== Newspapers ===
- "Miles Poindexter, Ex-Senator, Weds". Oakland Tribune. Oakland, CA. Associated Press. August 27, 1936 – via Newspapers.com.
- Niemeyer, H. H. (November 23, 1938). "Singer Without a Song". St. Louis Post-Dispatch. St. Louis, MO – via Newspapers.com.

=== Internet ===
- Washington Secretary of State (August 1, 2016). "Burial Record, Miles Poindexter". Cemetery Records: Fairmount Memorial Park. Olympia, WA: Washington State Archives.
- Special Collections, University of Washington Libraries (2006). "Biographical Note, Miles Poindexter". Miles Poindexter Photograph Collection, 1880s-1940s. Seattle, WA: University of Washington.

=== External sources ===
- United States Congress. "Miles Poindexter (id: P000403)". Biographical Directory of the United States Congress.

=== Archives ===
- Miles Poindexter Papers. 1897–1940. 189.79 cubic feet (442 boxes).
- Miles Poindexter photograph collection. circa 1910–1920. .12 cubic feet (4 folders). 162 photographic prints.
- Thomas Burke papers. 1875–1925. 24.78 cubic feet (58 boxes).
- Austin E. Griffiths papers. 1891–1952. 11.73 cubic feet (25 boxes). 1 microfilm reel.

Party political offices
First	Republican nominee for United States Senator from Washington (Class 1); 1916, 1922	Succeeded by Kenneth Mackintosh
U.S. House of Representatives
New district	Member of the U.S. House of Representatives from Washington's 3rd congressional district 1909–1911	Succeeded by William La Follette
U.S. Senate
Preceded by Samuel H. Piles	U.S. senator (Class 1) from Washington; 1911–1923; Served alongside: Wesley L. Jones	Succeeded by Clarence C. Dill
Diplomatic posts
Preceded by William E. Gonzales	United States Ambassador to Peru; April 20, 1923 – March 21, 1928	Succeeded by Alexander P. Moore
