= James H. Tillman =

American politician (1869–1911)

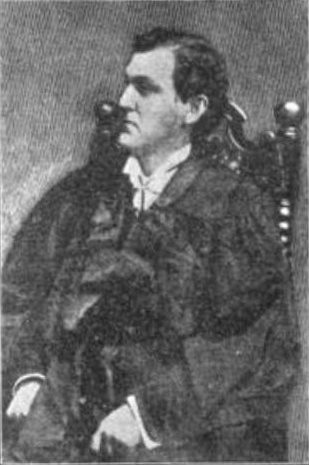
- Tillman in 1903

64th Lieutenant Governor of South Carolina
- In office January 15, 1901 – January 20, 1903
- Governor: Miles Benjamin McSweeney
- Preceded by: Robert B. Scarborough
- Succeeded by: John Sloan

Personal details
- Born: James Hammond Tillman; June 27, 1869 Clarks Hill, South Carolina, US
- Died: April 1, 1911 (aged 41) Asheville, North Carolina, US
- Relations: Benjamin Tillman (uncle); Osmund Woodward Buchanan (brother-in-law)
- Parent: George D. Tillman (father)
- Occupation: Politician

James Hammond Tillman (June 27, 1869 – April 1, 1911) was an American politician. A Democrat, he was the Lieutenant Governor of South Carolina, under Miles Benjamin McSweeney.

Tillman was the son of George D. Tillman and the nephew of Benjamin Tillman. He studied law, later being elected Lieutenant Governor. In 1903, he murdered journalist Narciso Gener Gonzales for criticizing him, and the ensuing trial was subject of mass coverage by newspapers.

== Early life and education ==
Tillman was born on June 27, 1869, in Clarks Hill, South Carolina (then part of Edgefield County), the son of politician George D. Tillman and Margaret (née Jones) Tillman. His uncle was politician Benjamin Tillman.

Tillman was educated at the Curryton Academy. He studied at the Emerson Preparatory School, Georgetown University Law Center, and the Virginia Military Institute. He read law in Winnsboro under his brother-in-law, Osmund Woodward Buchanan, and in 1891, was admitted to the bar.

== Career ==
Tillman did not pursue a career in law despite his admission to the bar, though journalist Thomas William Herringshaw called him one of South Carolina's foremost lawyers. During the Spanish–American War, he was a brigadier general in a South Carolina regiment. He was also a member of the South Carolina State Militia.

Tillman was a Democrat. In the 1890s, he rose to political prominence. He served as Lieutenant Governor from January 15, 1901, to January 20, 1903, under Miles Benjamin McSweeney. In 1902, he unsuccessfully ran for Governor of South Carolina, with him blaming his loss on the criticism he received from journalist Narciso Gener Gonzales. His voterbase was built through appeals to white supremacy and his familial connections.

=== Feud with Narciso Gener Gonzales ===
Tillman was an editorialist for the Winnsboro News and Herald, as which he wrote defenses for the beliefs of his uncle, Benjamin Tillman. These defenses were written under the pseudonym "Fair Play", and came in response to Gonzales' criticisms of Benjamin.

Gonzales, who wrote for The State, was a fierce critic of both Benjamin and James Tillman. During James' 1902 gubernatorial campaign, Gonzales called him a "proven liar, defaulter, gambler and drunkard", and accused him of falsifying records of the South Carolina Senate, military misconduct, and financial irresponsibility; all his accusations were backed by evidence. He later called Tillman boorish for not allowing President Theodore Roosevelt to visit South Carolina, as Roosevelt had barred Benjamin Tillman from attending a state dinner after his fistfight with John L. McLaurin. As a result of Gonzales' criticisms, Tillman was seen unfavorably by much of the people of South Carolina.

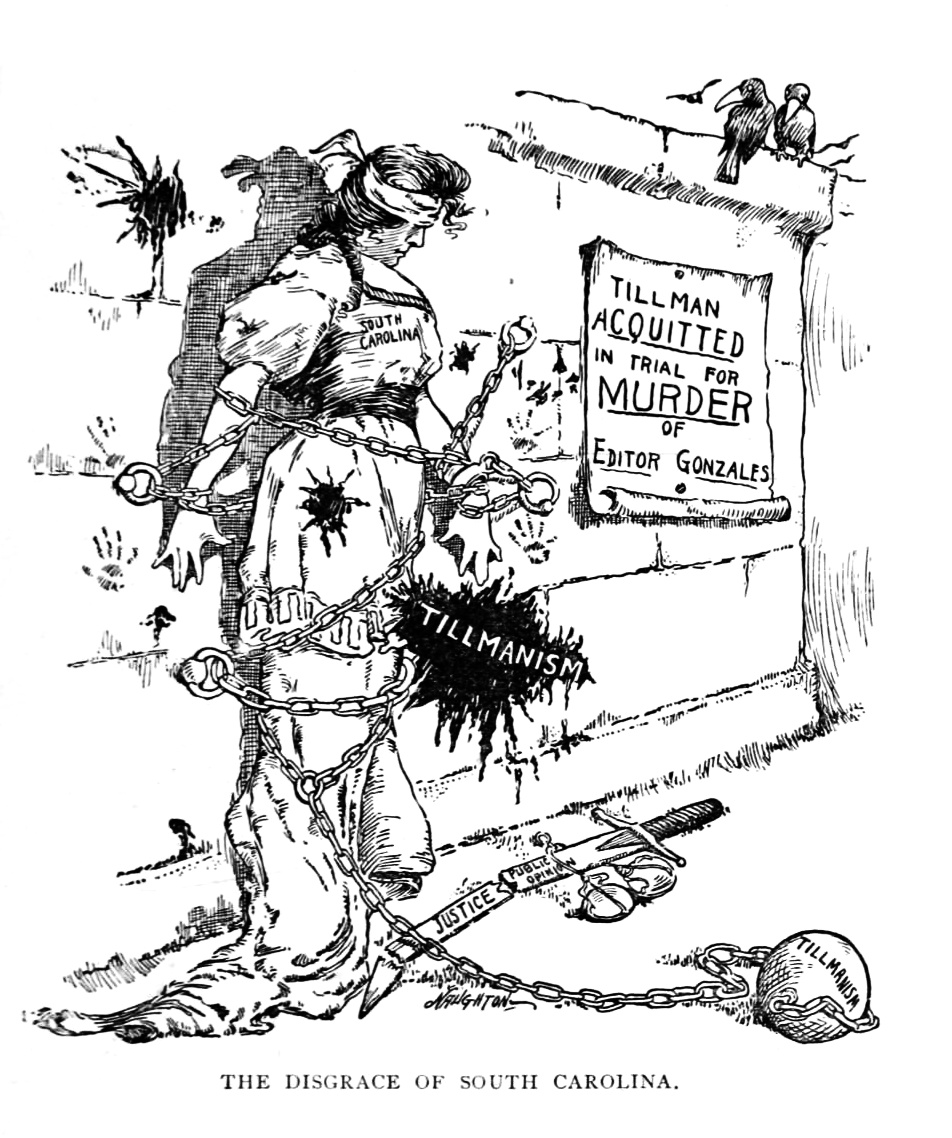
Political cartoon based on the trial's outcome

On January 15, 1903, Tillman spotted Gonzalez while outside the South Carolina State House in Columbia. He drew his pistol on Gonzales, who was unarmed, and shot him once in the abdomen; he died from his injuries on January 19. He was then arrested. Before his murder trial began, on September 28, his lawyers successfully had the trial moved to Lexington County, where the people were more favorable of Tillman. His lawyers argued that Gonzales moved his hands threateningly while they were in his pockets, therefore Tillman acted in self-defense, and that Gonzales' criticisms were justification. The judge of the trial was Frank B. Gary, and the solicitor was John William Thurmond, the father of Strom Thurmond. On October 15, he was found not guilty, following eight days of deliberation. The event was referred to as the "crime of the century" and the trial left concerns regarding the safety of journalists.

== Personal life and death ==
On June 25, 1896, Tillman married Mamie Norris; they had a daughter together. He spent his final years in poverty as a result of the Gonzales shooting. In January 1911, he stated that Benjamin Tillman can "go to hell" after learning of a negative comment made by him in relation to his financial situation. In February of the same year, a bill was introduced to Congress to give Tillman a pension of $30 per month; Benjamin Tillman refused to comment his stance on the bill. He died on April 1, 1911, aged 41, in Asheville, North Carolina, presumably from tuberculosis. He was buried in Edgefield.
