= Fancy Hill =

Historic house in Virginia, United States

- U.S. National Register of Historic Places
- Virginia Landmarks Register
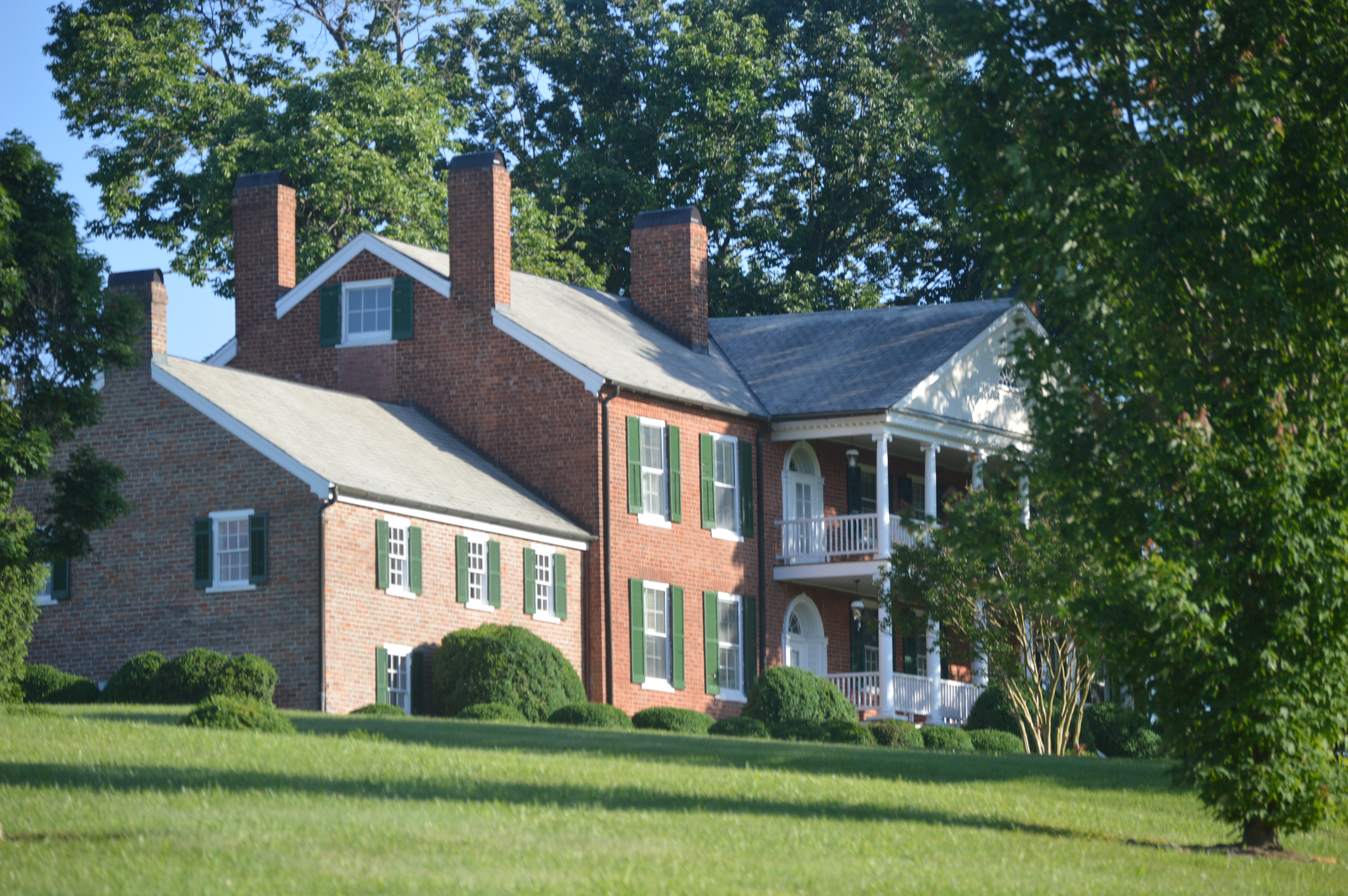
- Front of the house

- Location within Virginia Location within the United States
- Location: U.S. Route 11 southwest of Lexington, Virginia
- Coordinates: 37°41′23″N 79°29′12″W
- Area: 21 acres (8.5 ha)
- Built: c. 1821, c. 1831, c. 1840, 1936
- Architectural style: Early Republic, Federal
- NRHP reference No.: 97000957
- VLR No.: 081-0015

Significant dates
- Added to NRHP: September 5, 1997
- Designated VLR: July 2, 1997

Fancy Hill is a historic home located near Glasgow, Rockbridge County, Virginia, United States. The house was built in two phases, the first about 1821 and the second about 1831. The result is a two-story, eight-bay, Federal-style brick dwelling. Front and back two-story porches and two small rooms at the back of the house were added circa the 1840s. A 1½-story brick wing was added in 1936, when the house was renovated and back porch enclosed. The property also includes the contributing large gabled two-story barn, equipment garage, and small shed.

It was listed on the National Register of Historic Places in 1997.

The home previously hosted a small Santa Claus museum that was toured during the winter holiday season, and is now privately owned.
