= Clarence Dill =

American politician

Clarence Cleveland Dill
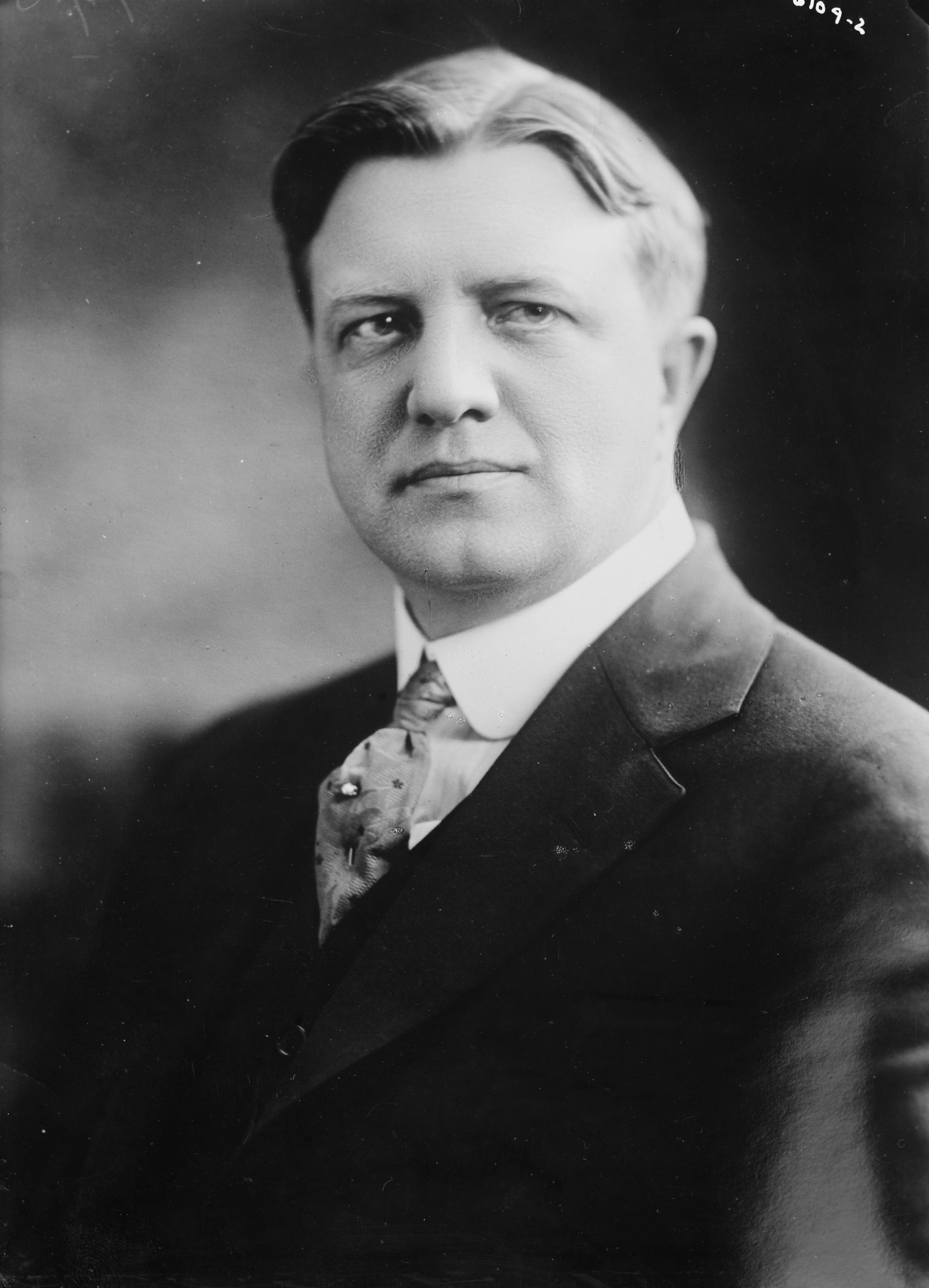

United States Senator from Washington
- In office March 4, 1923 – January 3, 1935
- Preceded by: Miles Poindexter
- Succeeded by: Lewis B. Schwellenbach

Member of the U.S. House of Representatives from Washington's 5th district
- In office March 4, 1915 – March 3, 1919
- Preceded by: Constituency established
- Succeeded by: J. Stanley Webster

Personal details
- Born: September 21, 1884 Fredericktown, Ohio, U.S.
- Died: January 14, 1978 (aged 93) Spokane, Washington, U.S.
- Resting place: Fairmount Memorial Park, Spokane, Washington
- Party: Democratic
- Spouse(s): Rosalie Gardiner Jones (m. 1927; div. 1936) Mabel A. Dickson (m. 1939; died 1969)
- Education: University of Delaware; Ohio Wesleyan University
- Profession: Lawyer, educator, reporter

Clarence Cleveland Dill (September 21, 1884 – January 14, 1978) was an American politician from the state of Washington. A Democrat, he was elected to two terms each in both houses of Congress.

== Early years ==
Dill was born in Fredericktown, Ohio, and attended Ohio Wesleyan University, where he was a member of the social fraternity Phi Kappa Psi. He completed his undergraduate work at the University of Delaware in 1907.

As a young man, Dill was a teacher, and moved west to Spokane, Washington, in 1908. He taught English at South Central High School and was a newspaper reporter at The Spokesman-Review in the summer.

== Political career ==
Dill became a lawyer in 1910, and soon entered politics. He was elected to the U.S. House in 1914 and 1916 from the newly created fifth district. On April 5, 1917, Dill was one of 50 representatives who voted against declaring war on Germany. His vote was controversial among his constituents, including members of his own party. The Spokane County Democratic Committee debated censuring Dill, but ultimately voted against doing so. Dill was narrowly defeated for re-election in 1918 by state supreme court justice J. Stanley Webster.

Dill was elected to the U.S. Senate in 1922, beating two-term incumbent Republican Miles Poindexter. Dill campaigned as a supporter of Progressive reform and pledged to repeal the Esch–Cummins Act and push for the Columbia Basin Project. Poindexter, who was supported by major newspapers such as The Spokesman-Review and The Seattle Times, attempted to portray Dill as a radical for his war record and his support of the Plumb Plan. Dill carried Spokane County, much of Eastern Washington, and the urban counties of the Puget Sound region. Dill was re-elected in 1928, but did not seek a third term in 1934. His election in 1928 marked the last time a candidate from Eastern Washington was elected U.S. Senator.

In the Senate, he was the chief sponsor of both the 1927 Radio Act and the 1934 Communications Act, and was a staunch proponent of the Grand Coulee Dam.

In June 1934, Congress amended the Watson-Parker Railway Labor Act so it explicitly included non-operating train personnel and sleeping car companies. Senator Dill sponsored the new act since he thought Pullman porters and maids should be black. A jurisdictional dispute between the Order of Sleeping Car Conductors and the Brotherhood of Sleeping Car Porters had to be first settled in the American Federation of Labor, but the effect was to quadruple membership in the Brotherhood. Black workers could now join the union without fear of losing their jobs.

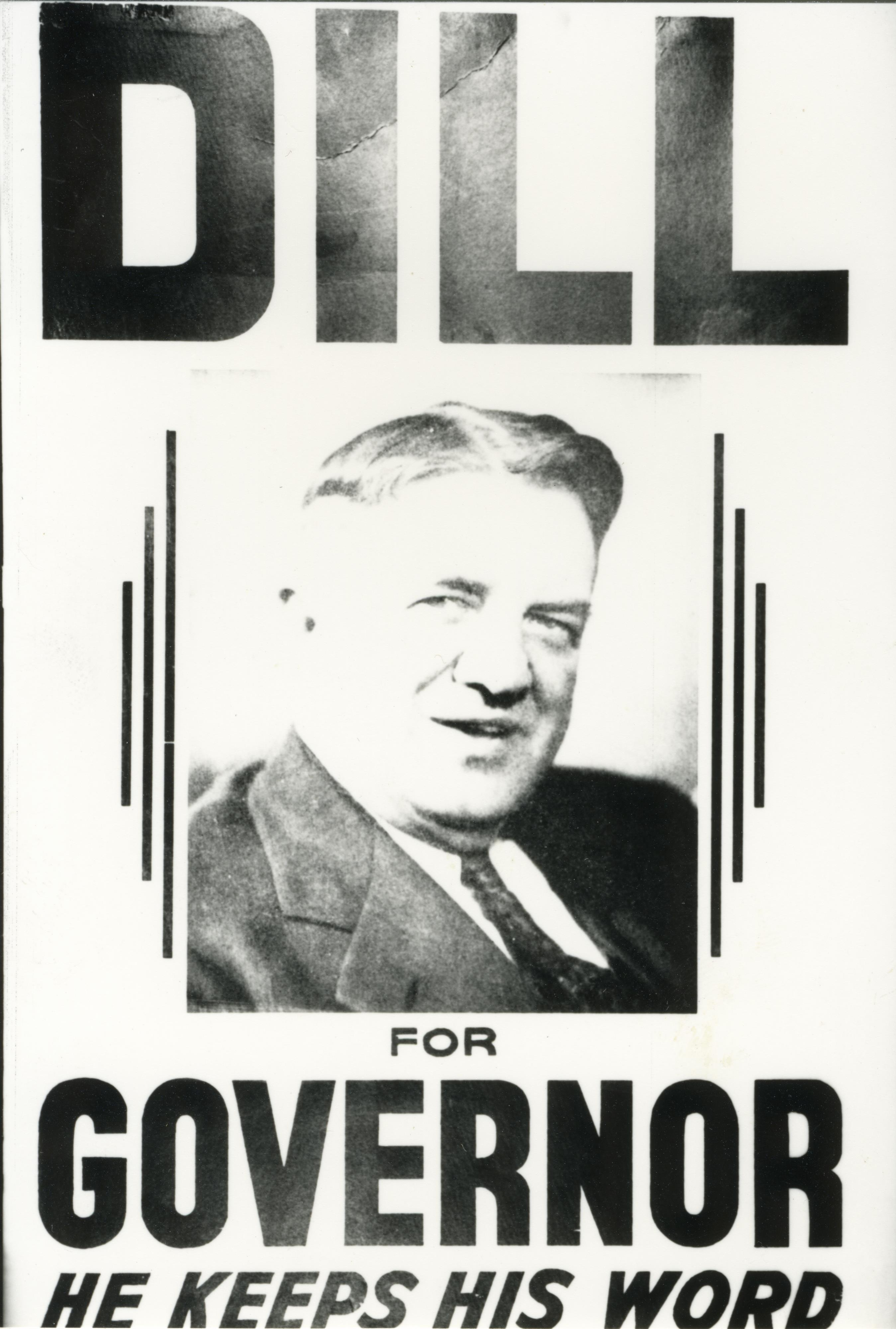
Dill for Governor poster, 1940

Dill ran for governor in 1940 but was narrowly defeated by Republican Arthur B. Langlie. His last attempt at elective office was for the open seat in Congress from Spokane's fifth district in 1942, but was easily defeated by Walt Horan, the first Republican to win that district in twenty years. Horan had lost to Charles Leavy by eleven points in the previous race in 1940.

Dill then served as a member of the Columbia Basin Commission from 1945 to 1948, and as a special assistant to the U.S. Attorney General from 1946 to 1953. In between all of these jobs, he usually practiced law. He died in 1978 in Spokane at the age of 93, the last living U.S. senator elected before the Great Depression and the last living senator to serve during the presidencies of Warren G. Harding, Calvin Coolidge and Herbert Hoover.

== Personal ==
After he left the Senate, Dill sought a divorce from his wife in 1936, the feminist suffragist and author Rosalie Gardiner Jones of New York. Dill claimed that Jones told his friends that he was "a political coward" for not seeking re-election in 1934, and that she buried dogs and garbage in the backyard. Separated while he was still in office, the well-publicized divorce proceedings began in late June 1936 in Spokane. The court found in his favor: he kept the house, she got the furniture.

Dill met home economics educator Mabel Aileen Dickson (1905–1969) in November 1936 in Washington, DC, and they were married in May 1939. Born in Crystal, North Dakota, she was raised in Canada; Dickson graduated from the University of Alberta in Edmonton and earned a master's degree at Washington State College in Pullman. They were married for thirty years, until her death from a heart ailment. Their 12,000 sq ft (1,100 m^{2}) home, Cliff Aerie, built in 1941 at 708 W. Cliff Drive, is a Spokane landmark.

== Electoral history ==
- 1914 Congress 5
  - C C Dill (D), 24,410
  - Harry Rosenhaupt (R), 20,063
  - Thomas Corkery (Prog), 15,509
  - J O Harkness (S), 4,502
  - F H Flanders (Proh), 2,270
- 1916 Congress 5
  - C C Dill (D), 37,479
  - Thomas Corkery (R), 32,298
  - John M Powers (S), 2,952
- 1918 Congress 5
  - Stanley Webster (R), 22426
  - C C Dill (D), 20,061
  - Peter Harrison (S), 473
- 1922 US Senate
  - C C Clarence Dill (D), 130,375
  - Miles Poindexter (R), 126,556
  - James Duncan (FL), 35,352
  - David Burgess (SL), 1,905
  - Frans Bostrom (Com), 489
- 1928 US Senate
  - C C Clarence Dill (D), 261,524
  - Kenneth Mackintosh (R), 227,415
  - Alex Noral (Com), 666
- 1940 Governor
  - Arthur B. Langlie (R), 392,522
  - C C Dill (D), 386,706
  - John Brockway (Com), 1,674
  - P J Ater (SL), 426
- 1942 Congress 5
  - Walt Horan (R), 29,380
  - C C Dill (D), 18,766

Party political offices
Preceded by George Turner	Democratic nominee for United States Senator from Washington (Class 1); 1922, 1928	Succeeded by Lewis B. Schwellenbach
Preceded by Clarence D. Martin	Democratic nominee for Governor of Washington; 1940	Succeeded by Monrad Wallgren
U.S. House of Representatives
Preceded by Jacob Falconer	Member of the U.S. House of Representatives from Washington's 5th congressional district March 4, 1915 – March 3, 1919	Succeeded by J. Stanley Webster
U.S. Senate
Preceded by Miles Poindexter	U.S. senator (Class 1) from Washington; March 4, 1923 – January 3, 1935; Served alongside: Wesley Jones, Elijah Grammer, Homer Bone	Succeeded by Lewis Schwellenbach
Honorary titles
Preceded by John Heiskell	Most senior living U.S. senator (Sitting or former); December 28, 1972 – January 14, 1978; With: Burton K. Wheeler until 1975	Succeeded by F. Ryan Duffy
