= William Elliott (writer) =

William Elliott (27 April 1788 – 3 February 1863) was a South Carolina writer of nonfiction.

== Life ==
Born in Beaufort, South Carolina, he entered Harvard at 18 and did well. He returned to South Carolina without completing his studies but received a degree in 1810. During the Nullification Crisis in South Carolina in 1832, he was a senator in the state legislature but resigned upon being instructed by his constituents to vote to nullify the tariff law. He did not believe in the right of nullification despite being unalterably opposed to protectionism. He then devoted himself to the management of his estates and rural sports and occasionally published essays on rural economy, controversial articles on political science and economics, sporting sketches signed "Venator" and "Piscator" and poems, and he delivered many addresses before agricultural societies. His letters against secession, signed "Agricola" and published in 1851, were among his latest expressions of opinion upon political subjects. He died in Charleston in 1863.

== Works ==
He contributed largely to the periodical press of the south, especially the Southern Review. His published works include:

- Address before the St. Paul's Agricultural Society (Charleston, 1850)
- Carolina Sports by Land and Water, a collection of sporting sketches originally contributed to one of the newspapers of Charleston, South Carolina (1856)
- Fiesco, a tragedy (1850)
