= The State (newspaper) =

Daily morning newspaper published in Columbia, South Carolina

- The paper's July 27, 2005 front page
- Type: Newspaper
- Format: Broadsheet
- Owner: The McClatchy Company
- Publisher: Brian Tolley
- Editor-in-chief: Brian Tolley
- Staff writers: approximately 33
- Founded: 1891
- Language: English
- Headquarters: Currently no physical location
- Circulation: 36,541 Daily; 45,103 Sunday (as of 2020)
- ISSN: 2578-594X
- OCLC number: 1333898093
- Website: www.thestate.com

The State is an American newspaper published in Columbia, South Carolina. The newspaper is owned and distributed by The McClatchy Company in the Midlands region of the state. It is by circulation, the second-largest newspaper in South Carolina after The Post and Courier.

== History ==
The newspaper, first published on February 18, 1891. was founded by two brothers, N.G. Gonzales and A.E. Gonzales. In 1903, N. G. Gonzales was fatally shot by lieutenant governor James H. Tillman, who was later acquitted of murder charges.

In 1945, The State bought its rival, the Columbia Record, with the parent company becoming The State-Record Company. The paper's owners diversified in 1971 by founding "State Telecasting Company". State Telecasting purchased two television stations in New Mexico and Texas, along with a station in South Carolina. KCBD in Lubbock, Texas, and its full-time satellite KSWS in Roswell, New Mexico, were acquired in 1971 for $6 million from the Joe Bryant estate. WUSN-TV in nearby Charleston, South Carolina, was acquired and the call letters changed to WCBD-TV to conform with those of KCBD. The paper remained in the hands of the Gonzales family until 1986, when Knight Ridder purchased the State-Record Company and six subsidiaries (including the Sun Herald and The Sun News) for $311 million. In 2006, Knight Ridder was purchased by McClatchy.

In 2020, McClatchy filed for bankruptcy and was purchased by hedge fund, Chatham Asset Management for $312 million.

On April 22, 2024 The State started printing Sunday, Wednesday and Friday only and delivering through the mail.

== Background ==
Its news staff was a Pulitzer Prize finalist in general news reporting for its Hurricane Hugo coverage in 1989. Its cartoonist, Robert Ariail, was a Pulitzer finalist in 1995 and 2000. Reporter Gina Smith and current projects editor broke the Mark Sanford scandal story on June 24, 2009, when she interviewed Sanford at Atlanta Hartsfield Airport as he returned from Argentina.

According to the newspaper's Web site, it had 440 full-time employees and another 31 who work part-time, not including an on-premises "McClatchy Customer Care Center for subscriber assistance." In 1988 during a period of circulation growth and general prosperity, The State opened a 260,000-square-foot (24,000 m^{2}) building at a cost of $46 million on Shop Road south of the state fairgrounds By 2021, the newsroom staff was estimated to be between 30-45 employees based on the bargaining unit size of "The State News Guild." McClatchy voluntarily recognized the union in April, 2021.

In 2017, the McClatchy Company listed the State's Columbia headquarters building for sale for $17,000,000. The building was unoccupied beginning in 2020. In 2025, it was announced that the site would be converted to host 200 new rental properties. Demolition was slated to begin in February, 2026 according to a video posted on Instagram by AllensDemo.

== See also ==
- List of newspapers in South Carolina
