= Henry Sicade =

Puyallup and Nisqually educator, activist, politician, and community advocate

Henry Sicade (February 12, 1866 - December 14, 1938) was a Puyallup and Nisqually educator, activist, politician, and community advocate who spent most of his life serving the Washington community. Henry Sicade was a member of the Puyallup Tribal Council for 46 years.

== Early life ==
Sicade was born February 12, 1866, in Lakeview, Washington Territory. His father, Charles Sicade (1846–1879), worked as a cowboy for the Hudson Bay Company and as a scout for American troops. Charles passed down his knowledge of both skills of the trade and of settler customs to his son. Sicade's mother, Susan Stann (1847–1882), was the daughter of Chief Stann of the Puyallup Tribe and related to Smoot-tas (also known as Steliacoom), a chief of many local indigenous groups. Sicade is the grand-nephew of Chief Leschi.

In 1869, Sicade's family moved to Puyallup. In 1873, his father enrolled him in the Puyallup Indian School (later Cushman Indian School). The school was located on the Puyallup reservation in Tacoma, and its goal was to educate Native Americans about the ideals of the dominant group. Sicade later wrote about his experience at the Puyallup Indian School, remembering how students were whipped and jailed for minor offenses. He notes that students were often hungry, and many went without care or even died when measles swept the school.

Sicade's father died in 1879, prompting him to travel to Forest Grove, Oregon. Here he attended the Indian Training School, which would later move to Chemawa, Oregon and be renamed the Chemawa Indian School. He completed four years of work in three.

In 1882, Sicade moved back to Washington following the death of his mother, Susan Stann. During this period, Sicade worked both as a contractor and a carpenter. In 1883, Sicade returned to Oregon for his studies. There he attended Tualatin Academy (now Pacific University). While in school, Sicade enrolled in the academy's military training program. After two years of training, he fell ill and was recommended by a doctor to leave school and spend more time outside.

In 1886, following the orders of his doctor, Sicade joined a group of cowboys in Pasco in Eastern Washington. After some time with this group, he earned the position of advance scout, which had him going ahead of the other men to survey land. During his time as a cowboy, he traveled across Washington, Idaho, Montana, South Dakota, Nebraska, Wisconsin, Michigan, Ontario, New York, and Chicago. He would later write about his days as a cowboy, stating, "I saw some thieves hanged, and good men bite the dust, in ridding the country of these bad characters. When we went out on the range we never knew if we would ever return alive."

== Washington ==
In 1886, upon learning of the introduction of the Dawes Act, Sicade traveled from Chicago to Tacoma, concerned about the security of his 122-acre lot that had been allotted to his parents under the Medicine Creek Treaty of 1854. When he arrived in Washington in 1887, he discovered that, following the passage of the Dawes Act, his family's lot had indeed been lost in land survey officials' misinterpretation of the law.

Sicade dedicated his first years in Tacoma to helping Native Americans navigate the United States legal system. Sicade helped mediate instances where the daily lives of Native Americans conflicted with the court system, such as when they foraged for berries on non-Native property. Sicade's staunch advocacy made him a notable figure to both Native Americans and non-Natives. He was eventually offered a position by the City of Tacoma as a liaison to local Native Americans, which he accepted. As a liaison, Sicade could more directly advocate for Native Americans about issues such as tribal funding, property disputes, and employment and labor rights. The position was taxing and made worse Sicade's preexisting health issues, and he officially resigned after the Great Seattle Fire of 1889, hoping to take a job surveying the damage.

Sicade then spent three years hop-picking which took him through Oregon, Alaska, California and British Columbia.

After Sicade left his position as liaison to local Native Americans, he moved to Fife in 1898. Here he would contribute greatly to the education system for Indigenous Americans as well as the surrounding communities. In 1899, Sicade spearheaded the founding of the Fife public school system. In 1903, alongside his friend William Henry Wilton, Sicade founded a new school meant to serve both indigenous and non-native youth. The aim of this school was to provide a better option than the Puyallup Indian School that Sicade had attended. Within three years of opening, the school grew from one room into a large two story building. The growth of Sicade's new school coincided with a mass decrease in enrollment in the Puyallup Indian School. This decrease in enrollment combined with the office of Indian affairs pushing the matter, the decision was made to close the Puyallup Indian School. Francis W. Cushman saved the school, marking its reopening and renaming it to Cushman Indian School. In 1920 the Cushman Indian School closed for good.

Throughout his life Henry Sicade continued working to improve education and Indigenous lives in Washington. Sicade was a 46 year long member of the Puyallup tribal council and he continued his work as a lobbyist for Indian County, on multiple occasions traveling to DC to advocate for Tribal matters. He served on the board of State Education for Indian Scholarships, he was Chairman of State School Directors, and he served more than 25 years on the Pierce county school board. His work went outside of education and Indigenous advocacy as well, he served as the local registrar for the selective service of 1918 and spent 35 years as the Precinct Committeeman for the Republican Party.

== Legacy ==
Henry Sicade died on December 14, 1938, at the age of 72. He was survived by Alice Lane, his wife, and his seven children.

Following his death, Sicade was memorialized by the region to which he dedicated his life. In life Sicade had significant effects on the region and since his death he has been remembered by the region. In 1929, the Tacoma Women's Club donated a granite boulder dedicated to Sicade and the other founders of Fife Public Schools. The memorial sits outside of Fife High School.

Sicade is frequently remembered as someone that spoke on behalf of the Native Americans in Washington. In a book published by the Washington State Historical Society in 1940 chronicling the state's founding and growth, Sicade authored the chapter titled "The Indians' Side of the Story." Originally written 1917, this section provides Sicade's singular perspective on early relations between white settlers and Native Americans in Washington. The book frames Sicade's insights as representative of the opinions of other local Native Americans.

Non-natives also referred to Sicade about questions regarding indigenous nomenclature. In a 1916 history of Tacoma, Herbert Hunt briefly mentions Sicade to note that he has "[devoted] much attention to the preservation of the language." Later in his life, Sicade informed ethnographers about South Puget Sound history and names.
