= 1913 United States Senate elections in Illinois =

- March 26, 1913

Two United States Senate elections (a regular and a special election) were held in Illinois on March 26, 1913. The two elections were interconnected through a compromise made to elect a Democrat in the regular election and a Republican in the special election.

These were the last elections to U.S. Senate from Illinois to take place by vote of state legislature, as the Seventeenth Amendment to the United States Constitution would make all subsequent U.S. Senate elections conducted by a popular vote.

The elections saw the election of Democrat J. Hamilton Lewis to a full term in the state's class 2 United States Senate seat in a regular election, and Republican Lawrence Y. Sherman to the state's class 3 United States Senate seat in a special election.

== Background and procedure ==
At the time, since the Seventeenth Amendment to the United States Constitution was yet to take effect, U.S. Senate seats were filled by votes of state legislatures.

In the November 1912 state elections, the Republicans lost control of the Illinois General Assembly due to the Republican / Progressive split. But while the Democrats held a plurality of the Illinois General Assembly, they did not have a majority. The General Assembly took up the matter of electing the senators on February 1. The General Assembly ultimately failed to elect until after the new congress began.

On March 26, in a compromise arranged by governor Edward Fitzsimmons Dunne, the General Assembly elected Democrat J. Hamilton Lewis to fill the full-term seat and Republican Lawrence Y. Sherman to fill the two remaining years of a vacancy that had just recently opened. This broke a deadlock on the matter that had been in place since February 11.

== Party primaries ==
Non-binding preference primaries were held April 9, 1912, which informed the legislature of the preferred candidate of the voters that participated in each party's primaries. They coincided with binding primaries held for other offices.

While the party was eligible to hold a primary, no Socialist primary was held for the office of U.S. Senator.

=== Democratic primary ===
==== Candidate ====
- J. Hamilton Lewis, former at-large U.S. congressman from Washington

==== Result ====
Democratic primary
Party	Candidate	Votes	%
Democratic	J. Hamilton Lewis	228,872	100
Total votes		228,872	100

=== Republican primary ===
==== Candidates ====
- Shelby Moore Cullom, incumbent senator and former governor of Illinois
- Lawrence Yates Sherman, former lieutenant governor of Illinois and former speaker of the Illinois House of Representatives
- Hugh S. Magill, Illinois state senator

==== Result ====
Republican primary
Party	Candidate	Votes	%
Republican	Lawrence Y. Sherman	178,063	46.16
Republican	Shelby Moore Cullom (incumbent)	129,375	33.54
Republican	Hugh S. Magill	78,344	20.31
Total votes		385,782	100

=== Prohibition primary ===
==== Candidate ====
- Alonzo Wilson, former member of the Illinois House of Representatives

==== Result ====
Prohibition primary
Party	Candidate	Votes	%
Prohibition	Alonzo E. Wilson	3,786	100
Total votes		3,786	100

== Regular election (class 2 seat) ==
Illinois general election (class 2)
- March 26, 1913
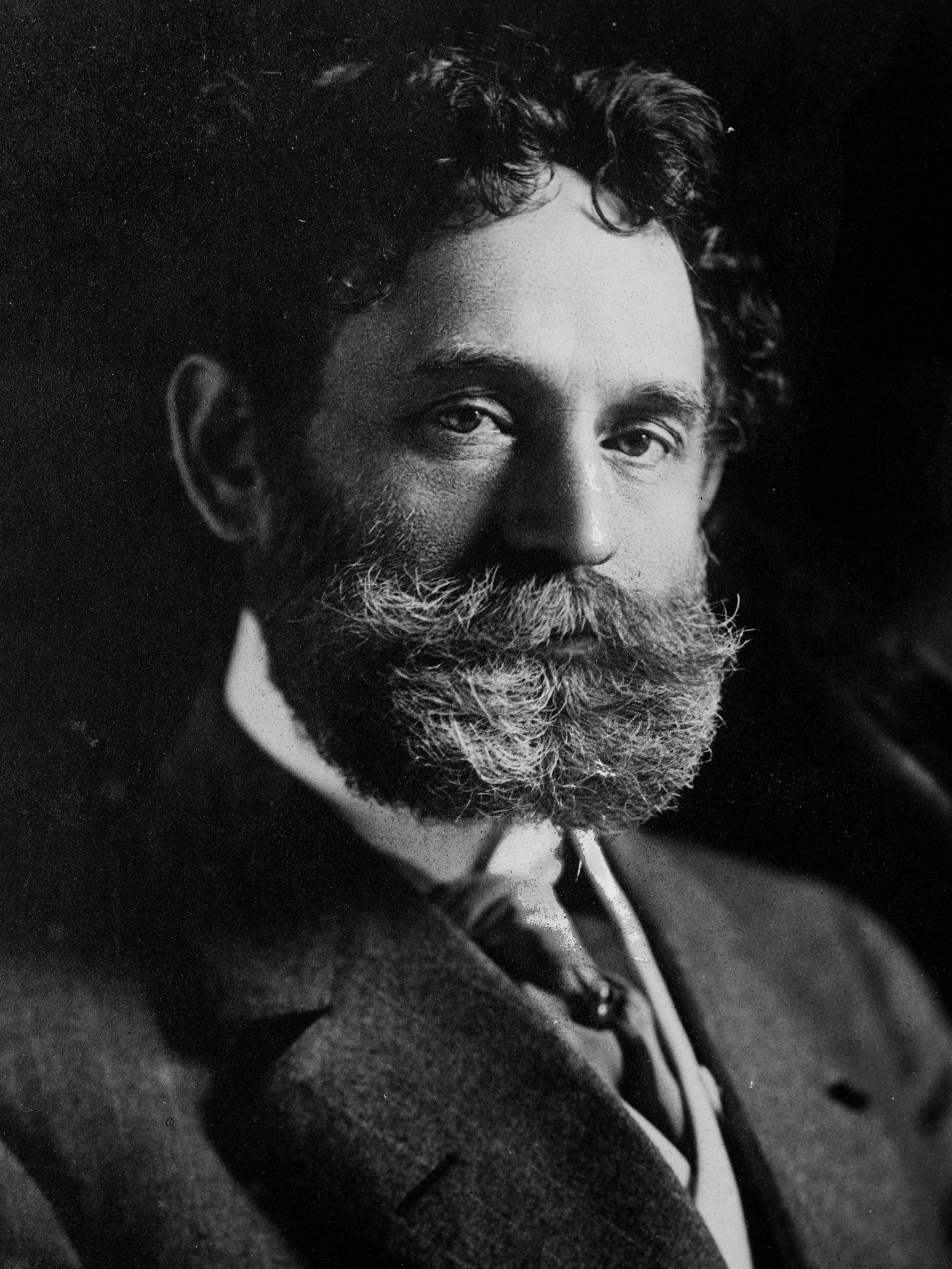

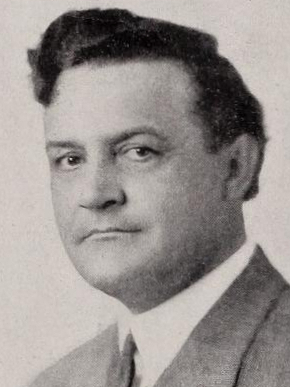
Nominee	J. Hamilton Lewis	Frank H. Funk
Party	Democratic	Progressive
Members' vote	164	22
Percentage	80.39%	10.78%
U.S. senator before election
Shelby Moore Cullom
Republican
Elected U.S. senator
J. Hamilton Lewis
Democratic

On April 12, 1912, five-term Republican incumbent Shelby Moore Cullom lost renomination to Lieutenant Governor of Illinois Lawrence Y. Sherman in the Republican "advisory" primary, where the voters expressed their preference for senator but the decision was not binding on the General Assembly, which made the actual choice. Cullom had suffered politically over his support for the other Illinois senator, William Lorimer, who was embroiled in a scandal over alleged bribery in his 1909 election to the Senate. After his defeat, Cullom withdrew his name from consideration by the General Assembly.

The Illinois General Assembly eventually elected the Democratic nominee, Congressman J. Hamilton Lewis March 26, 1913, who had previously won the Democratic advisory primary as the sole candidate on the ballot. Before their conclusive March 26 vote, after a compromise was stricken, the Illinois legislature had twelve-times cast deadlocked ballots for the class 2 senate seat. James Hamilton Lewis was the first non-Republican to win this seat since 1877 and was the first non-Republican to have held this seat since 1883.

Illinois legislative vote, class 2 (March 26, 1913)
Party	Candidate	Votes			%
Party	Candidate	State Senate	State House	Total votes	%
Democratic	J. Hamilton Lewis	45	119	164	82.41
Progressive	Frank H. Funk	2	20	22	11.06
Republican	Lawrence Y. Sherman	0	9	9	4.52
Socialist	Bernard Berlyn	0	4	4	2.01
Democratic gain from Republican					

== Special election (class 3 seat) ==
Illinois special election (class 3)
- March 26, 1913
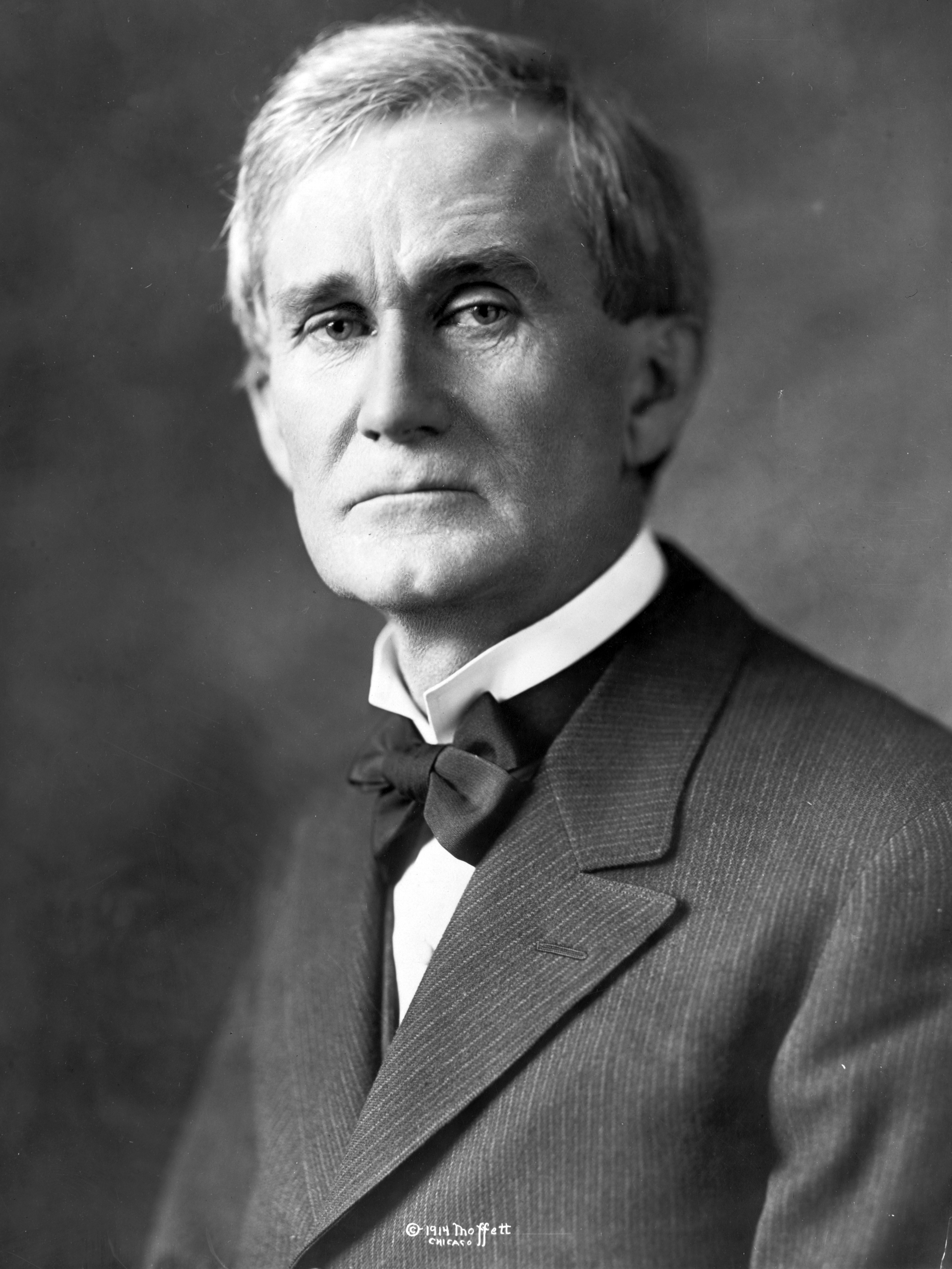

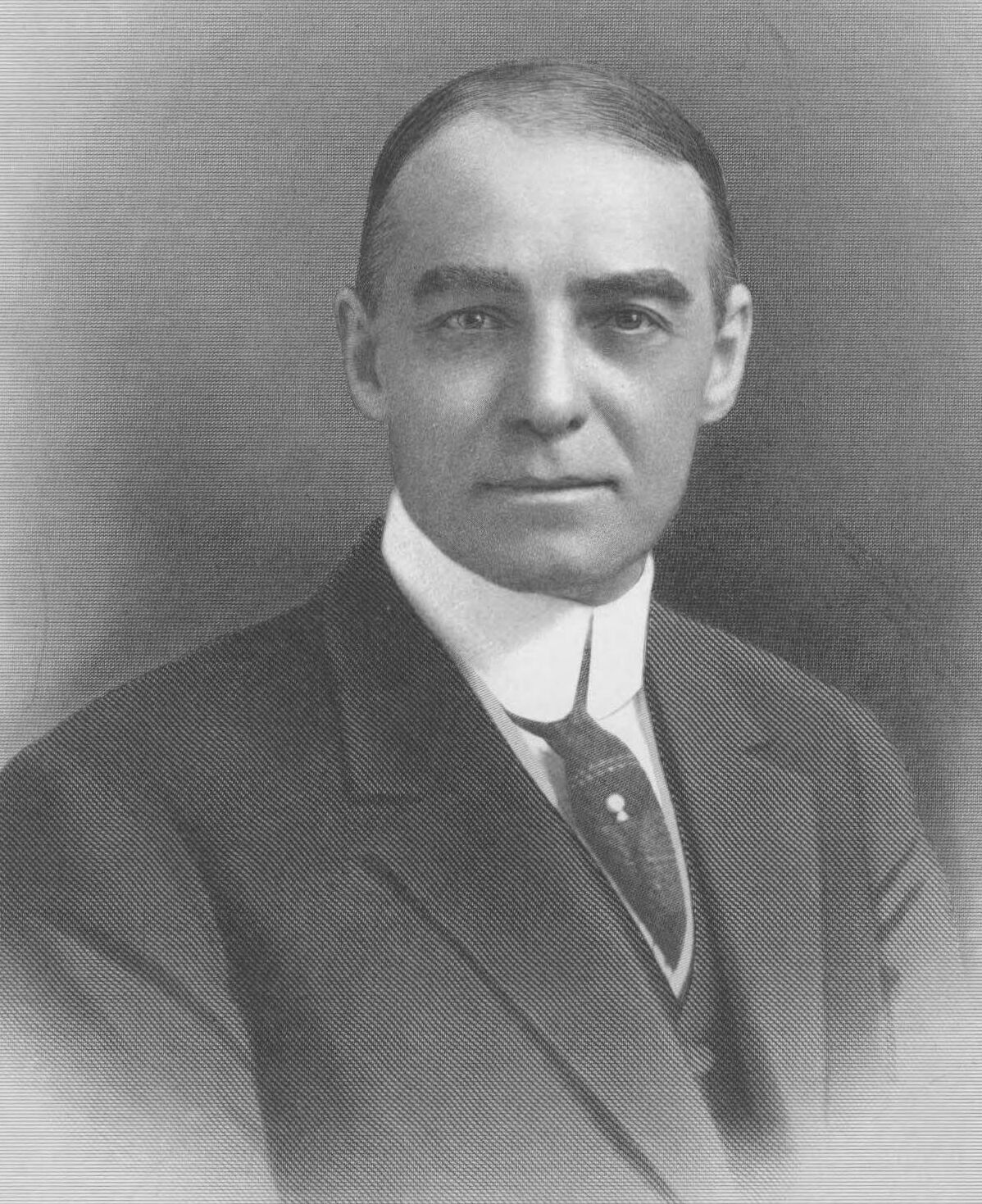

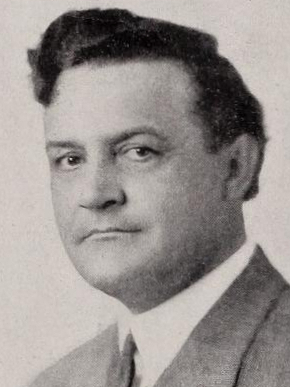
Nominee	Lawrence Y. Sherman	Charles Boeschenstein
Party	Republican	Democratic
Members' vote	143	25
Percentage	70.10%	12.26%
Nominee	Frank H. Funk
Party	Progressive
Members' vote	22
Percentage	10.78%
U.S. senator before election
Vacant
Elected U.S. senator
Lawrence Y. Sherman
Republican

In July 1912, the U.S. Senate invalidated William Lorimer's 1909 election and declared the seat vacant. The Illinois Attorney General, William H. Stead determined that the General Assembly had failed to properly elect Lorimer in 1909 and so the governor could not appoint a replacement. As a result, the General Assembly had a second Senate seat to fill.

Lawrence Y. Sherman, who had won the Republican advisory primary for Illinois’ regular senate election, was elected in the special election. Sherman defeated Democratic candidate Charles Boeschenstein, a newspaper publisher from Edwardsville and Democratic National Committeeman from Illinois.

Illinois special legislative vote, class 3 (March 26, 1913)
Party	Candidate	Votes	%
Republican	Lawrence Y. Sherman	143	73.33%
Democratic	Charles Boeschenstein	25	12.82%
Progressive	Frank H. Funk	22	11.28%
Socialist	McDonald	4	2.05%
Democratic	John Fitzpatrick	1	0.51%
Republican gain from Vacant			

== See also ==
- 1912 and 1913 United States Senate elections

== Bibliography ==
- "United States Senators Chosen, 1912". The Tribune Almanac and Political Register 1913. New York: The Tribune Association. 1913. p. 457 – via HathiTrust Digital Library.
