= Washington's at-large congressional district =

Former statewide congressional district

- Obsolete district
- Created: 1889; 1913; 1953
- Eliminated: 1909; 1915; 1959
- Years active: 1889-1909; 1913-1915; 1953-1959

At different times in its history, Washington elected one or more U.S. representatives at-large statewide.

From statehood in 1889 until 1909, Washington elected all of its U.S. representatives statewide. In 1909, Washington was divided into congressional districts for purposes of electing representatives.

Following the 1950 census, Washington was granted a seventh seat in the U.S. House of Representatives, but the state legislature was unable to agree on a plan to create a geographic district for the seat until 1957, so the seat was filled by a representative elected statewide.

From statehood in 1889 to 1893, Washington elected one representative at-large statewide.

From 1893 to 1903, Washington elected two representatives at-large statewide, then added a third seat in 1903. The third seat at large continued until 1909, when all representatives were elected from districts.

From 1913 to 1915, Washington elected two representatives at-large statewide, with the remaining three representatives elected from districts.

From 1953 to 1959, Washington elected one representative at-large statewide, with the remaining six representatives elected from districts.

After 1959, all representatives were elected from districts.

== List of representatives ==
Cong ress	Years	Seat A			Seat B			Seat C		
Cong ress	Years	Representative	Party	Electoral history	Representative	Party	Electoral history	Representative	Party	Electoral history
51	November 20, 1889 – March 3, 1891	John L. Wilson (Spokane)	Republican	Elected in 1889. Re-elected in 1890. Re-elected in 1892. Retired to run for U.S. senator and resigned when elected.	Seat added in 1893			Seat added in 1903		
52	March 4, 1891 – March 3, 1893	John L. Wilson (Spokane)	Republican	Elected in 1889. Re-elected in 1890. Re-elected in 1892. Retired to run for U.S. senator and resigned when elected.	Seat added in 1893			Seat added in 1903		
53	March 4, 1893 – February 18, 1895	John L. Wilson (Spokane)	Republican	Elected in 1889. Re-elected in 1890. Re-elected in 1892. Retired to run for U.S. senator and resigned when elected.	William H. Doolittle (Tacoma)	Republican	Elected in 1892. Re-elected in 1894. Lost re-election.	Seat added in 1903		
53	February 18, 1895 – March 3, 1895	Vacant			William H. Doolittle (Tacoma)	Republican	Elected in 1892. Re-elected in 1894. Lost re-election.	Seat added in 1903		
54	March 4, 1895 – March 3, 1897	Samuel C. Hyde (Spokane)	Republican	Elected in 1894. Lost re-election.	William H. Doolittle (Tacoma)	Republican	Elected in 1892. Re-elected in 1894. Lost re-election.	Seat added in 1903		
55	March 4, 1897 – March 3, 1899	William C. Jones (Spokane)	Silver Republican	Elected in 1896. Lost re-election.	J. Hamilton Lewis (Seattle)	Democratic	Elected in 1896. Lost re-election.	Seat added in 1903		
56	March 4, 1899 – March 3, 1901	Wesley L. Jones (North Yakima)	Republican	Elected in 1898. Re-elected in 1900. Re-elected in 1902. Re-elected in 1904. Re-elected in 1906. Retired to run for U.S. senator.	Francis W. Cushman (Tacoma)	Republican	Elected in 1898. Re-elected in 1900. Re-elected in 1902. Re-elected in 1904. Re-elected in 1906. Redistricted to the 2nd district.	Seat added in 1903		
57	March 4, 1901 – March 3, 1903	Wesley L. Jones (North Yakima)	Republican	Elected in 1898. Re-elected in 1900. Re-elected in 1902. Re-elected in 1904. Re-elected in 1906. Retired to run for U.S. senator.	Francis W. Cushman (Tacoma)	Republican	Elected in 1898. Re-elected in 1900. Re-elected in 1902. Re-elected in 1904. Re-elected in 1906. Redistricted to the 2nd district.	Seat added in 1903		
58	March 4, 1903 – March 3, 1905	Wesley L. Jones (North Yakima)	Republican	Elected in 1898. Re-elected in 1900. Re-elected in 1902. Re-elected in 1904. Re-elected in 1906. Retired to run for U.S. senator.	Francis W. Cushman (Tacoma)	Republican	Elected in 1898. Re-elected in 1900. Re-elected in 1902. Re-elected in 1904. Re-elected in 1906. Redistricted to the 2nd district.	William E. Humphrey (Seattle)	Republican	Elected in 1902. Re-elected in 1904. Re-elected in 1906. Redistricted to the 1st district.
59	March 4, 1905 – March 3, 1907	Wesley L. Jones (North Yakima)	Republican	Elected in 1898. Re-elected in 1900. Re-elected in 1902. Re-elected in 1904. Re-elected in 1906. Retired to run for U.S. senator.	Francis W. Cushman (Tacoma)	Republican	Elected in 1898. Re-elected in 1900. Re-elected in 1902. Re-elected in 1904. Re-elected in 1906. Redistricted to the 2nd district.	William E. Humphrey (Seattle)	Republican	Elected in 1902. Re-elected in 1904. Re-elected in 1906. Redistricted to the 1st district.
60	March 4, 1907 – March 3, 1909	Wesley L. Jones (North Yakima)	Republican	Elected in 1898. Re-elected in 1900. Re-elected in 1902. Re-elected in 1904. Re-elected in 1906. Retired to run for U.S. senator.	Francis W. Cushman (Tacoma)	Republican	Elected in 1898. Re-elected in 1900. Re-elected in 1902. Re-elected in 1904. Re-elected in 1906. Redistricted to the 2nd district.	William E. Humphrey (Seattle)	Republican	Elected in 1902. Re-elected in 1904. Re-elected in 1906. Redistricted to the 1st district.
61–62	March 4, 1909 – March 3, 1913	Inactive			Inactive			Seat eliminated		
63	March 4, 1913 – March 3, 1915	James W. Bryan (Seattle)	Progressive	Elected in 1912. Lost renomination.	Jacob Falconer (Everett)	Progressive	Elected in 1912. Retired to run for U.S. senator.	Seat eliminated		
64–82	March 4, 1916 – January 2, 1953	Inactive			Seat eliminated			Seat eliminated		
83	January 3, 1953 – January 3, 1957	Donald H. Magnuson (Seattle)	Democratic	Elected in 1952. Re-elected in 1954. Re-elected in 1956; Redistricted to the 7th district.	Seat eliminated			Seat eliminated		
84	January 3, 1955 – January 3, 1957	Donald H. Magnuson (Seattle)	Democratic	Elected in 1952. Re-elected in 1954. Re-elected in 1956; Redistricted to the 7th district.	Seat eliminated			Seat eliminated		
85	January 3, 1957 – January 3, 1959	Donald H. Magnuson (Seattle)	Democratic	Elected in 1952. Re-elected in 1954. Re-elected in 1956; Redistricted to the 7th district.	Seat eliminated			Seat eliminated		
