= 1932 United States Senate election in Washington =

- November 8, 1932
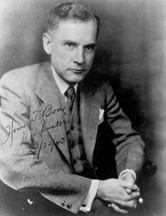

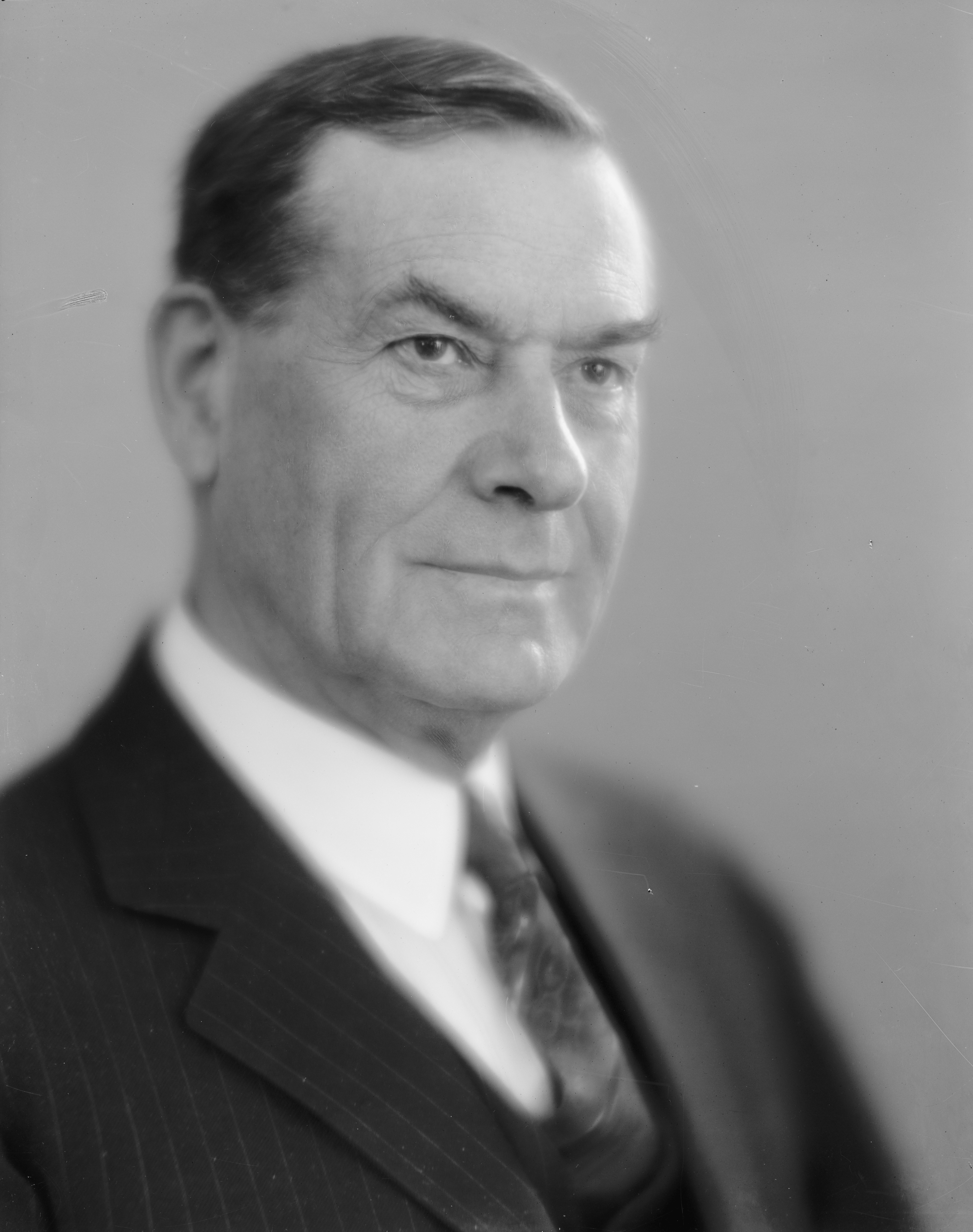
Nominee	Homer Bone	Wesley L. Jones
Party	Democratic	Republican
Popular vote	371,535	220,204
Percentage	60.61%	32.70%
- County results Bone: 40–50% 50–60% 60–70% 70–80%
U.S. senator before election
Wesley Livsey Jones
Republican
Elected U.S. Senator
Homer Bone (Note: Though Bone became senator-elect after the election, Jones's death left a vacancy which was filled by Elijah Sherman Grammer until Bone's term began in March.)
Democratic

The 1932 United States Senate election in Washington was held on November 8, 1932. Incumbent Republican U.S. Senator Wesley Livsey Jones ran for a fifth term in office, but was defeated by former State Representative Homer Bone.

Bone defeated Jones in a landslide. The percentage margin of 27.9 points may be the largest for any incumbent major-party nominee in Senate history. Jones died on November 19, less than two weeks after the election.

== Blanket primary ==
=== Candidates ===
==== Democratic ====
- Lloyd Black, former Snohomish County prosecutor
- Homer Bone, former Farmer-Labor State Representative from Tacoma
- Edwin J. Brown, former mayor of Seattle (1922–1926)
- Stephen J. Chadwick, former Chief Justice of the Washington Supreme Court

==== Republican ====
- Adam Beeler, Justice of the Washington Supreme Court
- Wesley Livsey Jones, incumbent Senator since 1909

=== Results ===
1932 U.S. Senate blanket primary
Party	Candidate	Votes	%
Republican	Wesley Livsey Jones (incumbent)	118,249	31.40%
Democratic	Homer Bone	98,094	26.04%
Republican	Adam Beeler	78,966	20.97%
Democratic	Stephen J. Chadwick	47,817	12.70%
Democratic	Lloyd Black	20,623	5.48%
Democratic	Edwin J. Brown	12,898	3.42%
Total votes		376,647	100.00%

== General election ==
=== Candidates ===
- Homer Bone, former State Representative from Tacoma (Democratic)
- Frederick R. Burch (Liberty)
- Andrew T. Hunter (Socialist)
- Wesley Livsey Jones, incumbent U.S. Senator since 1908 (Republican)
- Alex Noral (Communist)

=== Results ===
1932 United States Senate election in Washington
Party	Candidate	Votes	%	±%
Democratic	Homer Bone	365,939	60.61%	▲14.09
Republican	Wesley Livsey Jones (incumbent)	197,450	32.70%	▼18.61
Liberty	Frederick R. Burch	28,859	4.78%	N/A
Socialist	Andrew T. Hunter	9,364	1.55%	N/A
Communist	Alex Noral	2,183	0.36%	N/A
Total votes		603,795	100.00%	
Democratic gain from Republican		Swing		

== See also ==
- 1932 United States Senate elections
