= Wesley L. Jones =

American politician (1863–1932)

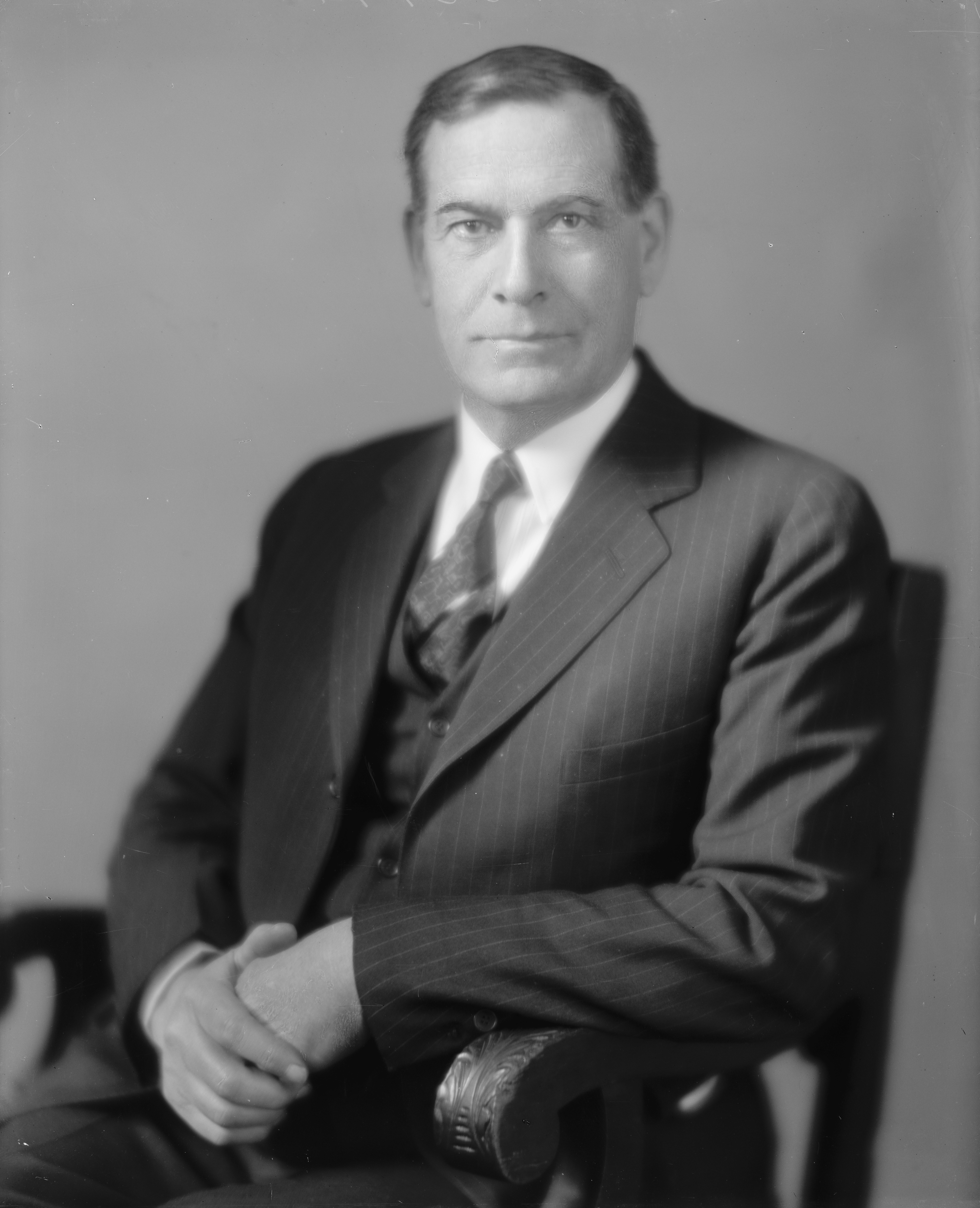

Senate Majority Whip
- In office November 9, 1924 – March 4, 1929; Acting: November 9, 1924 – March 3, 1925
- Leader: Charles Curtis
- Preceded by: Charles Curtis
- Succeeded by: Simeon D. Fess

United States Senator from Washington
- In office March 4, 1909 – November 19, 1932
- Preceded by: Levi Ankeny
- Succeeded by: Elijah S. Grammer

Member of the U.S. House of Representatives from Washington's at-large district
- In office March 4, 1899 – March 3, 1909
- Preceded by: William C. Jones
- Succeeded by: James W. Bryan (1913)

Personal details
- Born: Wesley Livsey Jones; October 9, 1863 Bethany, Illinois, U.S.
- Died: November 19, 1932 (aged 69) Seattle, Washington, U.S.
- Party: Republican
- Spouse: Minda Nelson (m. 1886)
- Children: 2
- Education: Southern Illinois College, Enfield (BA)

Wesley Livsey Jones (October 9, 1863 – November 19, 1932) was an American politician who served in the United States House of Representatives and the United States Senate representing the state of Washington.

Born near Bethany, Illinois, days after the death of his father, who was serving in the Union Army during the American Civil War, Jones grew up working on farms. He taught school before graduating from Southern Illinois College in Enfield, Illinois. He studied law in Chicago, passed the bar, and became active in politics as a Republican. In 1889, he moved to North Yakima, in eastern Washington, where he worked in real estate and practiced law. In 1898, he was elected as a Republican to the United States House of Representatives, where he served five terms. He won a seat in the United States Senate in 1908; he served from 1909 until his death, and served in both leadership positions and as chairman of several Senate committees.

Jones lost his 1932 bid for reelection. He died soon after the November election, but before his term expired in March 1933. He died in Seattle, and was interred at Seattle's Bonney-Watson Mortuary.

== Early life ==
Jones was born near Bethany, Illinois, the son of Wesley and Phoebe Jones; he was born three days after the death of his father, who was serving as a private in Company B, 41st Illinois Volunteer Infantry Regiment during the American Civil War. He graduated from Southern Illinois College in Enfield, Illinois, and studied law in Chicago while teaching school at night.

He passed the bar in 1886, and started a law practice in Decatur, Illinois. He also began to get active in politics, having joined the Republican Party. While living in Illinois, Jones campaigned for James G. Blaine for president in 1884, and for Benjamin Harrison in 1888.

== Marriage and family ==
In 1886 Jones also married Minda Nelson, starting a family. They had two children together, daughter Hazel E. and son Harry B. Jones. Hazel Jones later married Arthur Coffin.

== Move to Washington state ==
In 1889, Jones moved to North Yakima, in eastern Washington. It was a developing area near the Yakima River. He worked in the real estate business and continued to practice law.

The town developed near the Yakama Indian Reservation, where several related peoples had been settled since the mid-nineteenth century, when they signed a treaty ceding millions of acres of land to the United States.

== Political career ==
After moving to Washington state, Jones became active in the Sons of Union Veterans of the Civil War. His leadership roles in the organization gave him name recognition that enabled him to begin a political career. Beginning in 1890, Jones was a sought-after campaign speaker in Washington, and took part in Republican rallies throughout the state.

In 1898, Jones was elected to represent Washington's at-large congressional district. He was reelected four times, and served in the U.S. House from March 4, 1899, to March 3, 1909.

In 1908, Jones ran successfully for a seat representing Washington in the United States Senate. He was first elected by the state legislature, but, after passage of the 17th amendment to the US Constitution in 1913, he was later elected by popular vote. Jones was reelected by popular vote in 1914, 1920, and 1926; he served from March 3, 1909, until his death. In 1917, Jones moved from Yakima to Seattle, the state's major city and port, located on Puget Sound on the west side of the Cascade Mountains.

In the Senate, Jones advanced to a leadership position as Majority Whip, a post he held from 1924 to 1929. He also served as chairman of several committees, including: Industrial Expositions (61st Congress); Fisheries (62nd Congress); Disposition of Useless Executive Papers (64th and 65th Congresses); Investigate Trespassers Upon Indian Land (65th Congress); Commerce (66th through 71st Congresses); and Appropriations (71st and 72nd Congresses).

Jones was a successful advocate for federal investment in the Pacific Northwest. He secured funding for several irrigation projects, which particularly aided farmers in the more arid eastern part of the state. In 1906 he proposed a bill requiring the Yakama Nation to give up three-quarters of their land in order to gain any irrigation rights. This was opposed not only by the confederated tribes but by their allied European-American advocates, such as Lucullus Virgil McWhorter, a prominent rancher in Yakima who worked to support Native American rights and culture. In 1914 Jones's bill finally died in committee.

Jones also gained construction of a large naval facility, the Puget Sound Navy Yard in Bremerton, on the west side of Puget Sound. It was important to the area economy and continues to provide many jobs in the area. In 1920 he sponsored and secured passage of the Jones Merchant Marine Act, which stipulated that only American ships could carry cargo between American ports, thereby making Alaska dependent on Seattle-based shipping.

Jones was a vocal proponent of prohibition throughout his political career. Initially this aided his popularity, but it likely contributed to his electoral defeat in 1932. The 28-point loss was the second-largest of any major-party nominee in history. More importantly, the Great Depression had set in, and many Republicans lost to Democrats in this election, as voters sought other solutions to growing unemployment. Jones was defeated by Democrat Homer Bone, who swept in with President Franklin D. Roosevelt.

== Death and burial ==
Jones died in Seattle on November 19, 1932, shortly after losing reelection to his Senate seat, but before his final term had expired. A replacement was appointed to serve until the winner of the election took office in 1933. His ashes were interred at Bonney-Watson Mortuary in Seattle.

== See also ==
- List of members of the United States Congress who died in office (1900–1949)

== Sources ==
Books

- Campbell, John A. (1902). A Biographical History, with Portraits, of Prominent Men of the Great West. Chicago, IL: Western Biographical and Engraving Co. p. 685.
- Marquis, Albert Nelson (1910). Who's Who in America. Vol. VI. Chicago, IL: A. N. Marquis & Company.
- United States Congress (1919). Official Congressional Directory. Vol. 65. Washington, DC: US Government Printing Office.
- United States Congress (1933). Wesley L. Jones, late a Senator from Washington. Washington, DC: US Government Printing Office – via GenealogyBank.com.

Magazines

- Chapple, Joe Mitchell (February 1, 1910). "Affairs at Washington". National Magazine. Boston, MA: Chapple Publishing Company.
- Jones, Wesley L. (1922). "The Merchant Marine Act of 1920". Proceedings of the Academy of Political Science. New York, NY: Columbia University. p. 233.

Internet

- Office of the Historian. "Biography, Wesley Livsey Jones". history.house.gov/. Washington, DC: United States House of Representatives.
- "Biographical Notes, Wesley L. Jones Papers, 1896-1932". Archives West. Eugene, OR: Orbis Cascade Alliance. 2007.

Newspapers

- "Senator Jones of Washington Dies". Charleston Daily Mail. Charleston, SC. United Press. November 19, 1932. p. 1 – via Newspapers.com.

U.S. House of Representatives
Preceded by William C. Jones	Member of the U.S. House of Representatives from Washington's at-large congressional district 1899–1909	Vacant Title next held by James W. Bryan
U.S. Senate
Preceded by Levi Ankeny	U.S. Senator (Class 3) from Washington; 1909–1932; Served alongside: Samuel H. Piles, Miles Poindexter, Clarence Dill	Succeeded by Elijah S. Grammer
New office	Chair of the Senate Industrial Expositions Committee; 1909–1911	Succeeded by Elihu Root
Preceded by Jonathan Bourne Jr.	Chair of the Senate Fisheries Committee; 1911–1913	Succeeded by John Thornton
Preceded by James Paul Clarke	Chair of the Senate Executive Papers Disposition Committee; 1915–1918	Succeeded by Merrill Moores
Preceded by Paul O. Husting	Chair of the Senate Indian Land Trespassers Committee; 1918–1919	Succeeded by Henry F. Ashurst
Preceded by Duncan U. Fletcher	Chair of the Senate Commerce Committee; 1919–1930	Succeeded by Hiram Johnson
Preceded by Charles Curtis	Senate Majority Whip; 1924–1929; Acting: 1924–1925	Succeeded by Simeon D. Fess
Preceded by Francis E. Warren	Chair of the Senate Appropriations Committee; 1930–1932	Succeeded by Frederick Hale
Party political offices
New title	Republican nominee for U.S. Senator from Washington (Class 3); 1914, 1920, 1926, 1932	Succeeded by Ewing Colvin
Preceded by Charles Curtis	Senate Republican Whip; 1924–1929; Acting: 1924–1925	Succeeded by Simeon D. Fess
