= 1938 United States Senate election in Washington =

- November 8, 1938
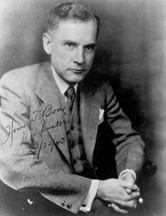

Nominee	Homer Bone	Ewing D. Colvin
Party	Democratic	Republican
Popular vote	371,535	220,204
Percentage	62.62%	37.12%
- County results Bone: 50–60% 60–70% 70–80% Colvin: 50–60%
U.S. senator before election
Homer Bone
Democratic
Elected U.S. Senator
Homer Bone
Democratic

The 1938 United States Senate election in Washington was held on November 8, 1938. Incumbent Democratic U.S. Senator Homer Bone was re-elected to a second term in office over Republican Ewing D. Colvin.

== Blanket primary ==
The blanket primary was held on September 13, 1938.

=== Candidates ===
==== Democratic ====
- Homer Bone, incumbent senator since 1933
- Otto A. Case, former state treasurer (1933–37) and candidate for governor in 1936

==== Republican ====
- Ewing D. Colvin
- Howard E. Foster
- Frank M. Goodwin, candidate for U.S. Senate in 1934

=== Results ===
Blanket primary results
Party	Candidate	Votes	%
Democratic	Homer Bone (incumbent)	243,682	55.31%
Republican	Ewing D. Colvin	101,364	23.01%
Democratic	Otto A. Case	59,264	13.45%
Republican	Frank M. Goodwin	20,691	4.70%
Republican	Howard E. Foster	15,557	3.53%
Total votes		440,558	100.00%

== General election ==
=== Candidates ===
- Ewing D. Colvin (Republican)
- Homer Bone, incumbent U.S. Senator since 1933 (Democratic)
- Eugene V. Solie (Socialist Labor)

=== Results ===
1938 United States Senate election in Washington
Party	Candidate	Votes	%
Democratic	Homer Bone (incumbent)	371,535	62.62%
Republican	Ewing D. Colvin	220,204	37.12%
Socialist Labor	Eugene V. Solie	1,553	0.26%
Total votes		593,292	100.00%
Democratic hold			

== See also ==
- 1938 United States Senate elections
