= 1918 United States Senate election in Illinois =

- November 5, 1918
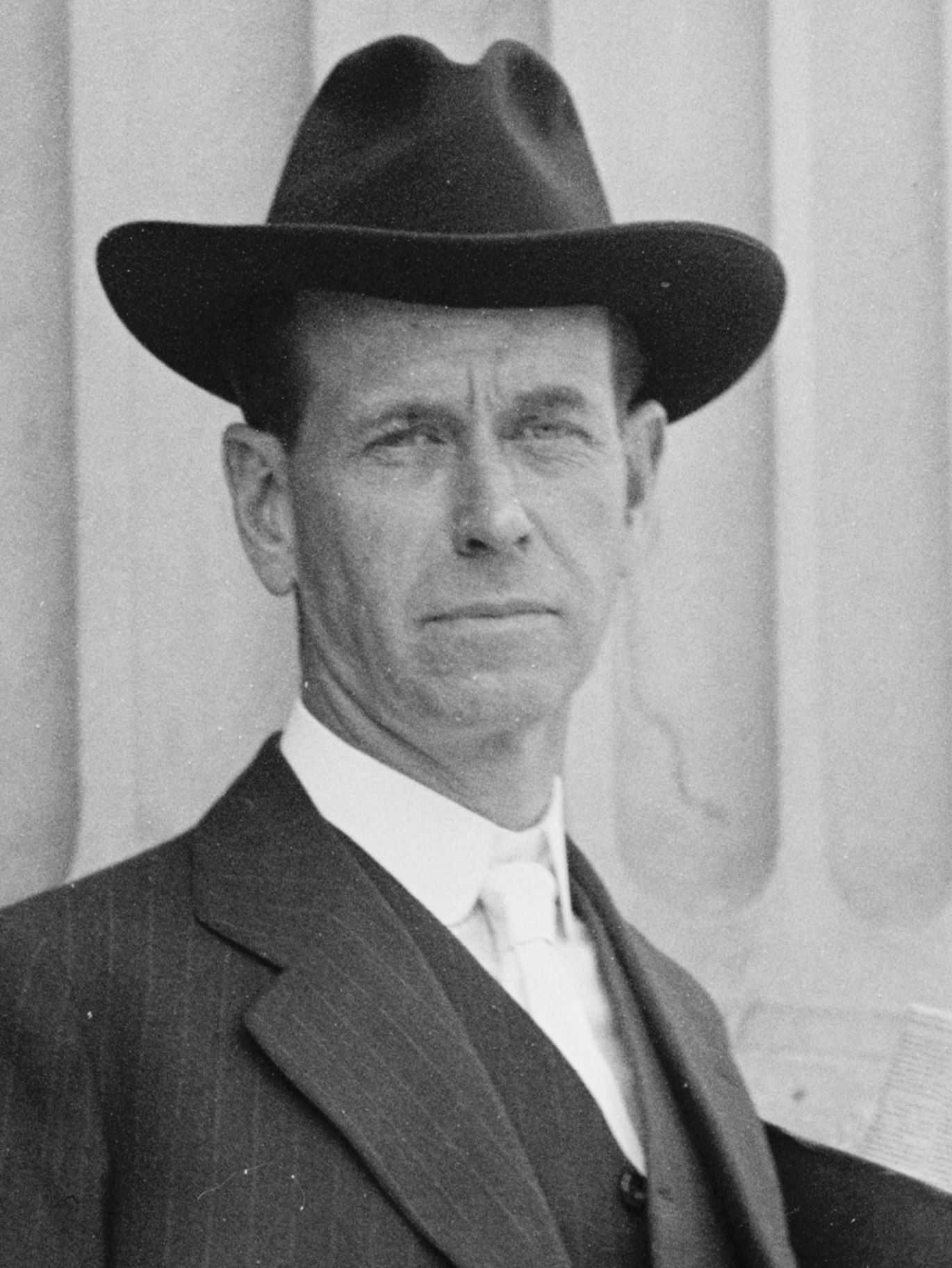

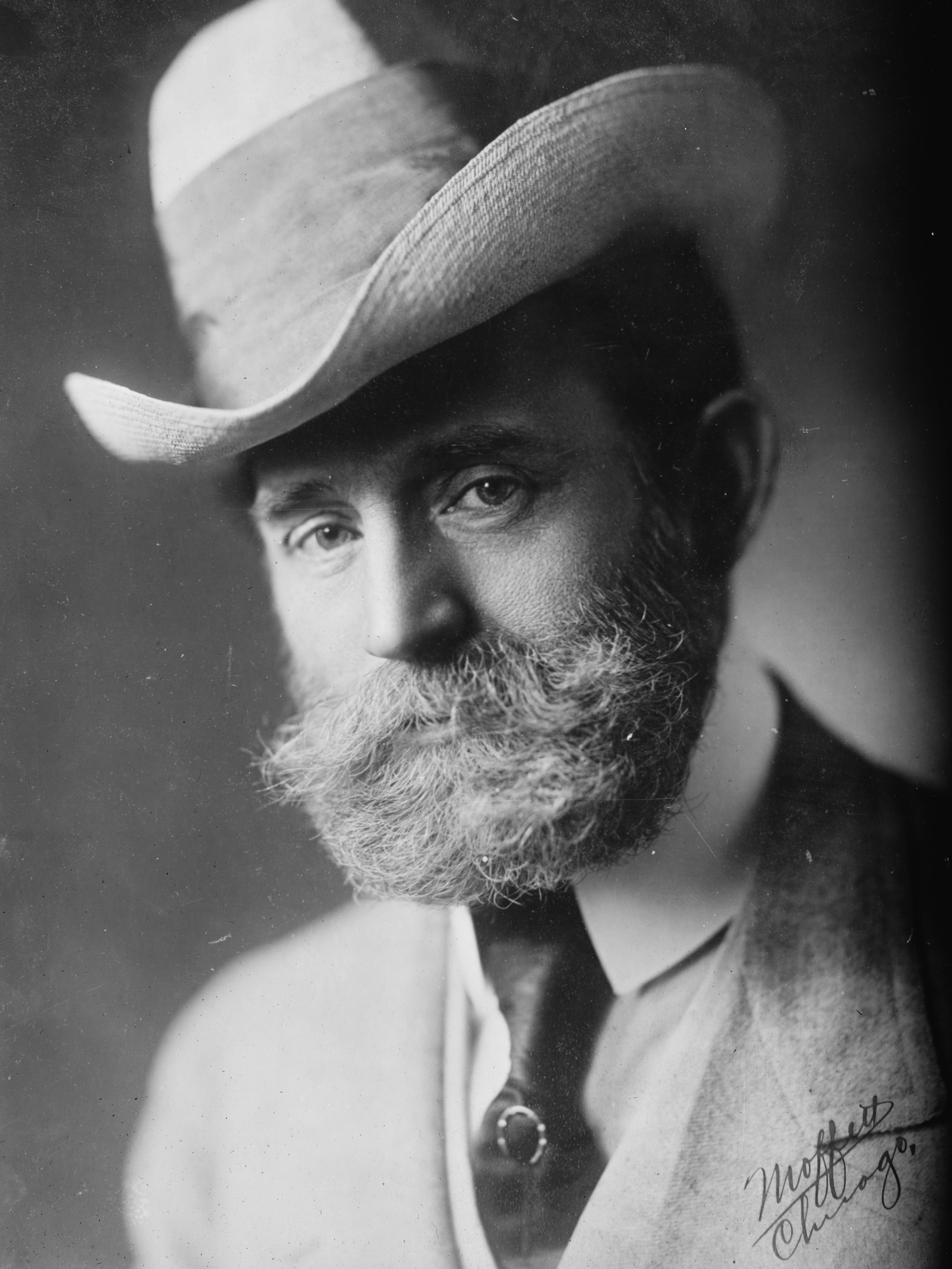
Nominee	Medill McCormick	J. Hamilton Lewis
Party	Republican	Democratic
Popular vote	479,967	426,943
Percentage	50.50%	44.92%
- County results McCormick: 40–50% 50–60% 60–70% 70–80% 80–90% Lewis: 40–50% 50–60% 60–70%
U.S. senator before election
J. Hamilton Lewis
Democratic
Elected U.S. senator
Medill McCormick
Republican

The 1918 United States Senate election in Illinois took place on November 5, 1918.

Incumbent Democrat J. Hamilton Lewis lost reelection to Republican Medill McCormick.

The primaries and general election coincided with those for House and those for state elections. The primaries were held September 11, 1918.

This was the first election for this U.S. Senate seat to be held after the Seventeenth Amendment to the United States Constitution went into effect, and was therefore the first time that this seat faced a popular election.

== Democratic primary ==
=== Candidates ===
- James Hamilton Lewis, incumbent U.S. senator
- James O. Monroe, attorney and perennial candidate
- James Traynor

=== Results ===
Democratic primary
Party	Candidate	Votes	%
Democratic	James Hamilton Lewis (incumbent)	169,552	81.37
Democratic	James O. Monroe	21,288	10.22
Democratic	James Traynor	17,523	8.41
Total votes		208,363	100

== Republican primary ==
=== Candidates ===
- Alfred E. Case
- George Edmund Foss, U.S. congressman
- Medill McCormick, U.S. congressman
- Patrick H. O'Donnell
- William Hale Thompson, mayor of Chicago

=== Results ===
Republican primary
Party	Candidate	Votes	%
Republican	Medill McCormick	192,222	44.04
Republican	William Hale Thompson	169,552	38.85
Republican	George Edmund Foss	62,040	14.22
Republican	Patrick H. O'Donnell	7,535	1.73
Republican	Alfred E. Case	5,075	1.16
Total votes		436,424	100

== Socialist primary ==
=== Candidates ===
- William Bross Lloyd, attorney and activist

=== Results ===
Socialist primary
Party	Candidate	Votes	%
Socialist	William Bross Lloyd	1,801	100
Total votes		1,801	100

== General election ==
=== Candidates ===
- John M. Francis (Socialist Labor)
- J. Hamilton Lewis (Democrat), incumbent U.S. senator
- William Bross Lloyd (Socialist), attorney and activist
- Medill McCormick (Republican), U.S. congressman
- Frank B. Vennum (Prohibition Party), activist, capitalist, philanthropist, and 1912 candidate for Illinois treasurer

=== Results ===
1918 United States Senate election in Illinois
Party	Candidate	Votes	%
Republican	Medill McCormick	479,967	50.50
Democratic	James Hamilton Lewis (incumbent)	426,943	44.92
Socialist	William Bross Lloyd	37,167	3.91
Socialist Labor	John M. Francis	3,268	0.34
Prohibition	Frank B. Vennum	3,151	0.33
Majority		53,024	5.58
Turnout		950,496	
Republican gain from Democratic			

== See also ==
- 1918 United States Senate elections
