= Bert E. Haney =

American judge (1879–1943)

Bert Emory Haney
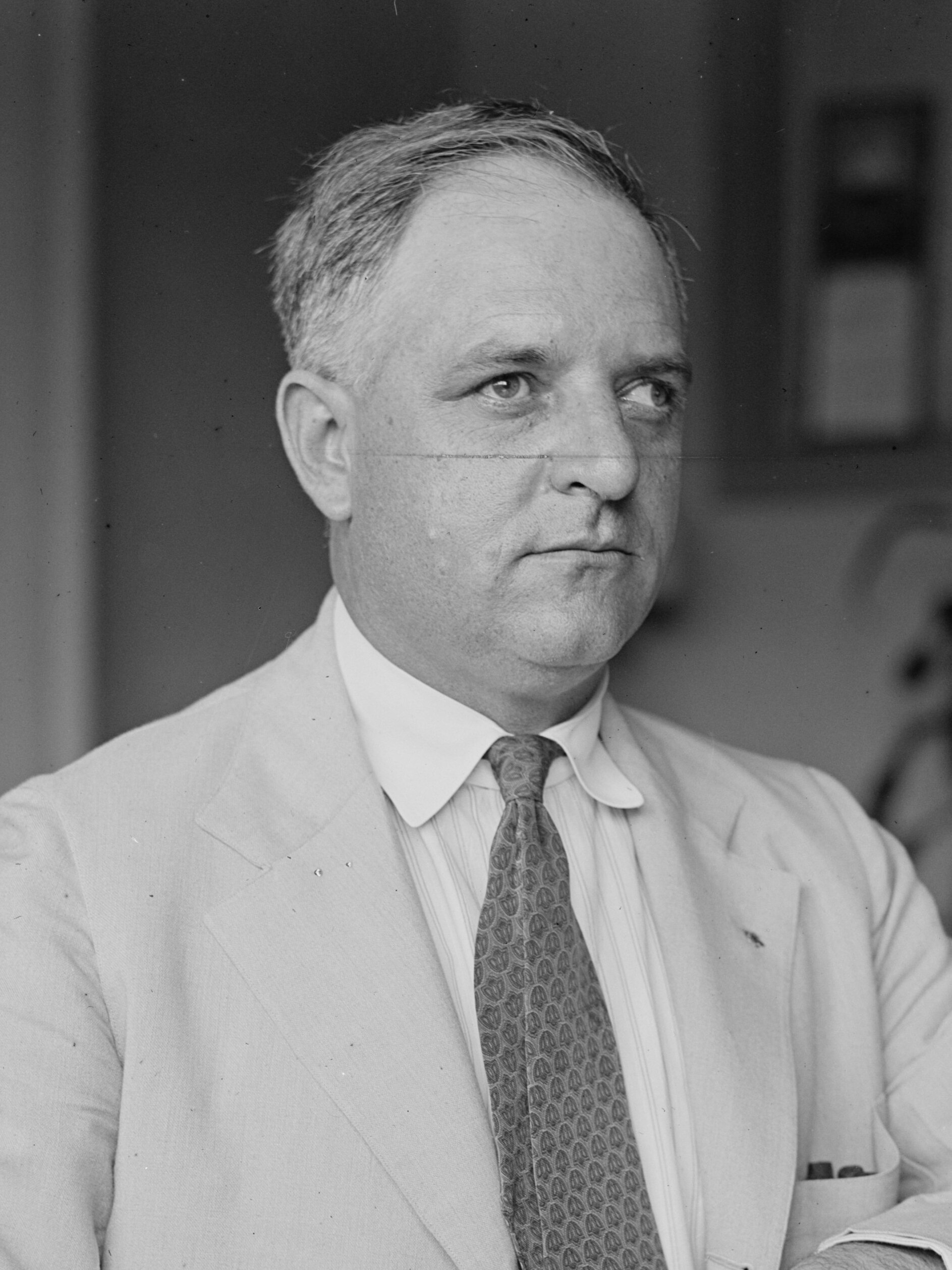
- Haney in 1923

Judge of the United States Court of Appeals for the Ninth Circuit
- In office August 24, 1935 – September 18, 1943
- Appointed by: Franklin D. Roosevelt
- Preceded by: Seat established by 49 Stat. 508
- Succeeded by: Homer Bone

Personal details
- Born: Bert Emory Haney; April 10, 1879 Lafayette, Oregon, U.S.
- Died: September 18, 1943 (aged 64)
- Party: Democratic
- Education: University of Oregon School of Law (LLB)

Bert Emory Haney (April 10, 1879 – September 18, 1943) was a United States circuit judge of the United States Court of Appeals for the Ninth Circuit.

== Early life ==
Haney was born on April 10, 1879, in Lafayette, Oregon. The son of John Haney and Mary Haney (née Harris), he attended the local public schools in Lafayette. After completing his secondary education, Haney attended Willamette University in Salem, Oregon. He then graduated from the University of Oregon School of Law in 1903 with a Bachelor of Laws. At the time the school was still located in Portland, Oregon. Haney married Jessie A. Holmes on November 21, 1906.

== Career ==
On May 28, 1903, Haney passed the bar and was admitted to practice law by the Oregon Supreme Court. He began working for William D. Fenton in June, remaining with him for one year. On July 1, 1904, Haney was selected to serve as a deputy district attorney for Oregon's fourth judicial district, keeping the position until July 1, 1908. A Democrat, he then started a legal partnership with George W. Joseph on that day and remained in private practice until 1918.

During this time, he served as the Chairman of the Oregon Democratic State Committee from 1910 to 1915. Previously he had been secretary of the party's county and city committees from 1904 to 1907. In 1918, Haney left private practice to become the United States Attorney for the District of Oregon. Two years later he returned to private practice in Portland, and from 1922 to 1923 he also was the Chairman of the state's parole board. In 1923, he left his legal practice and became a member of the United States Shipping Board, serving until 1926.

In 1926, Haney ran as the Democratic Party nominee for the United States Senate against Frederick Steiwer and Robert N. Stanfield. After losing to Steiwer, Haney returned to Portland and again resumed private legal practice, practicing until 1935.

== Federal judicial service ==
Haney was nominated by President Franklin D. Roosevelt on August 21, 1935, to the United States Court of Appeals for the Ninth Circuit, to a new seat authorized by 49 Stat. 508. He was confirmed by the United States Senate on August 23, 1935, and received his commission on August 24, 1935. His service terminated on September 18, 1943, due to his death.

Party political offices
Preceded by George Earle Chamberlain	Democratic nominee for U.S. Senator from Oregon (Class 3); 1926	Succeeded by Walter B. Gleason
Legal offices
Preceded by Seat established by 49 Stat. 508	Judge of the United States Court of Appeals for the Ninth Circuit; 1935–1943	Succeeded by Homer Bone
