= Homer Bone =

American judge (1883–1970)

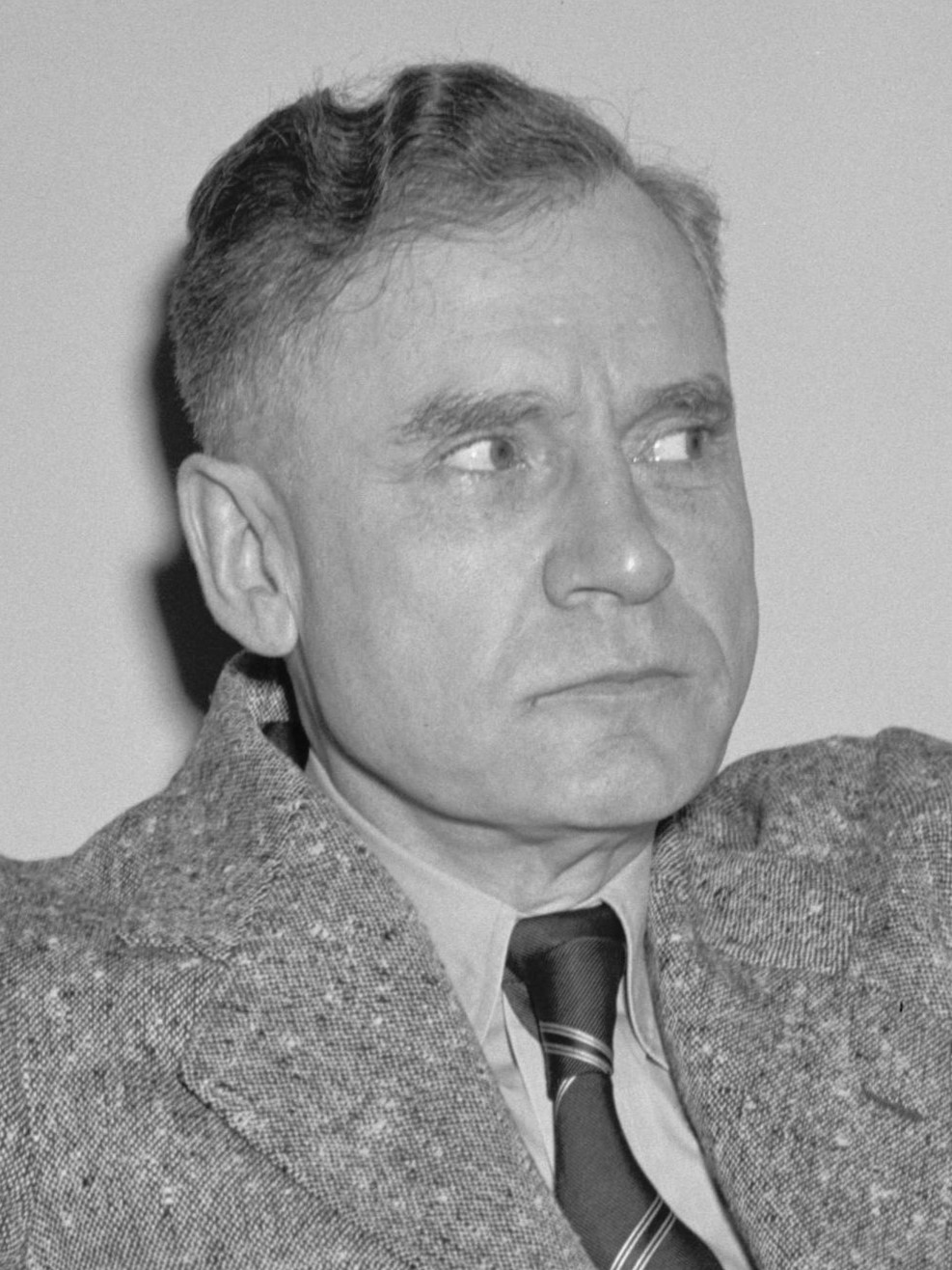
- Bone in 1939

Senior Judge of the United States Court of Appeals for the Ninth Circuit
- In office January 1, 1956 – March 11, 1970

Judge of the United States Court of Appeals for the Ninth Circuit
- In office April 1, 1944 – January 1, 1956
- Appointed by: Franklin D. Roosevelt
- Preceded by: Bert E. Haney
- Succeeded by: Frederick George Hamley

United States Senator from Washington
- In office March 4, 1933 – November 13, 1944
- Preceded by: Elijah S. Grammer
- Succeeded by: Warren Magnuson

Member of the Washington House of Representatives from the 37th district
- In office January 8, 1923 – January 12, 1925
- Preceded by: Multi-member district
- Succeeded by: Multi-member district

Personal details
- Born: Homer Truett Bone; January 25, 1883 Franklin, Indiana, U.S.
- Died: March 11, 1970 (aged 87) Tacoma, Washington, U.S.
- Resting place: Oakwood Cemetery
- Party: Socialist (before 1920); Farmer–Labor (1920–1928); Republican (1928–1932); Democratic (after 1932)
- Spouse: Blanche I. Sly
- Education: Tacoma Law School

Homer Truett Bone (January 25, 1883 – March 11, 1970) was an American attorney and politician in Washington state, where he settled in Tacoma as a youth with his family from Indiana. He ran as a candidate for a variety of parties and was elected to the State House. In 1932, he was elected as a Democrat as United States Senator from Washington, and re-elected to a second term.

In 1944, Bone was appointed as a United States circuit judge of the U.S. Court of Appeals for the Ninth Circuit. He served until his death, the last years in senior status.

== Early life ==
Born on January 25, 1883, in Franklin, Indiana, Bone attended the public schools. He first worked for the United States postal service and in the accounting and credit department of a furniture company.

Bone moved with his parents and family to Tacoma, Washington in 1899 after the state was admitted to the Union. He graduated from the Tacoma Law School (now defunct) in 1911.

== Career ==
He was admitted to the bar the same year and entered private practice in Tacoma. From 1911 to 1932, he was in private practice.

In 1912 Bone served as a special deputy prosecutor for Pierce County, Washington in 1912. He also served as corporation counsel for the Port of Tacoma in Washington from 1918 to 1932.

=== State legislative service ===
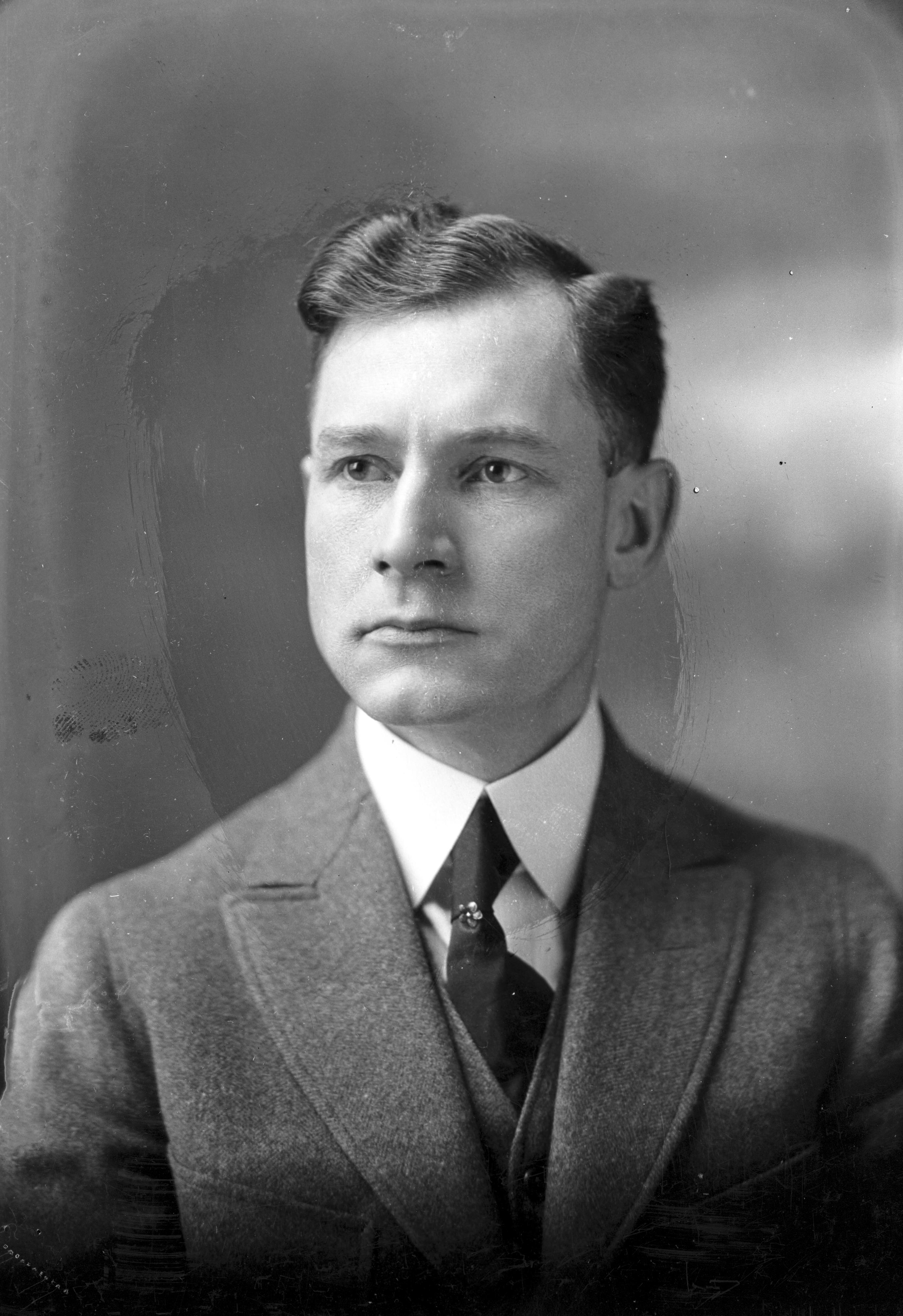
Bone's official State House portrait, 1923

Initially belonging to the Socialist Party of America, Bone ran as an unsuccessful candidate for prosecuting attorney and Mayor of Tacoma. He was elected to the Washington House of Representatives as a Farmer-Laborite, serving one term from 1923 to 1925.

=== State advocacy ===
While in the Washington House of Representatives, Bone advocated for county governments to have the ability to form public utility districts, a political battle that was finally won when voters approved it as an initiative he helped spearhead.

=== Congressional service ===
Bone ran unsuccessfully for the United States House of Representatives in 1920 as the Farmer–Labor Party candidate. In 1928 he once again ran for Congress, this time as a Republican, but lost the primary.

With the deepening of the Great Depression and changing political attitudes among voters, Bone joined the Democratic Party. He ran for the United States Senate in 1932 and defeated multi-term incumbent, Republican Wesley L. Jones. Bone was reelected in 1938, serving in total from March 4, 1933, until his resignation on November 13, 1944, when he was confirmed for a federal judgeship. He served as Chairman of the Committee on Patents for the 76th through the 78th United States Congresses.

=== Congressional advocacy ===
Bone continued his advocacy for publicly owned power and other progressive causes. He supported construction of the Bonneville Dam and the Grand Coulee Dam in eastern Washington state, which were important for hydropower generation, flood control, and irrigation.

He opposed involvement in World War II.

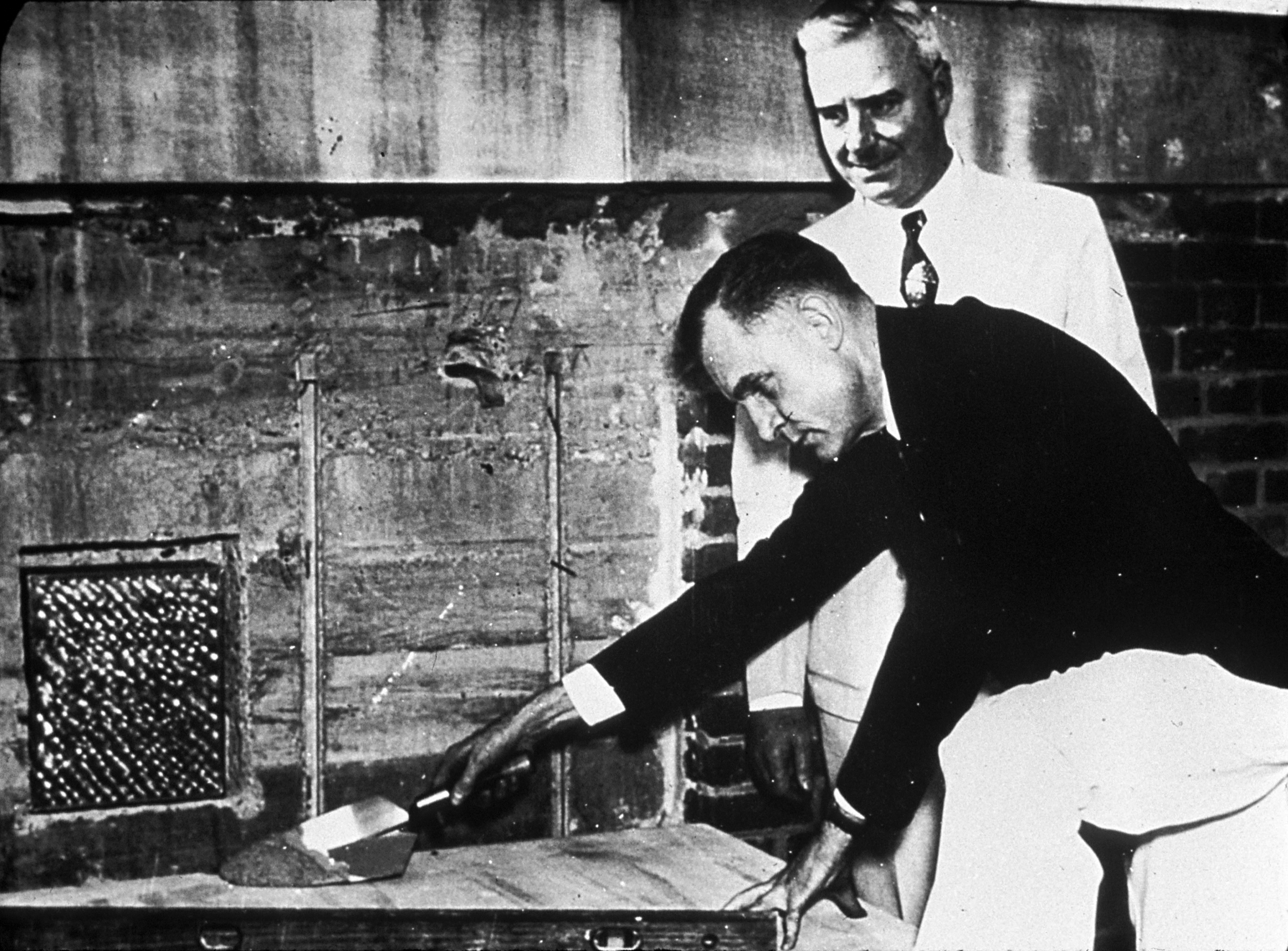
Bone lays the cornerstone to the National Cancer Institute building as Surgeon General Thomas Parran looks on, June 24, 1939

Along with Senator Matthew Neely and Representative Warren Magnuson, Bone wrote the legislation that created the National Cancer Institute, one of the elements of the National Institutes of Health.

=== Federal judicial service ===
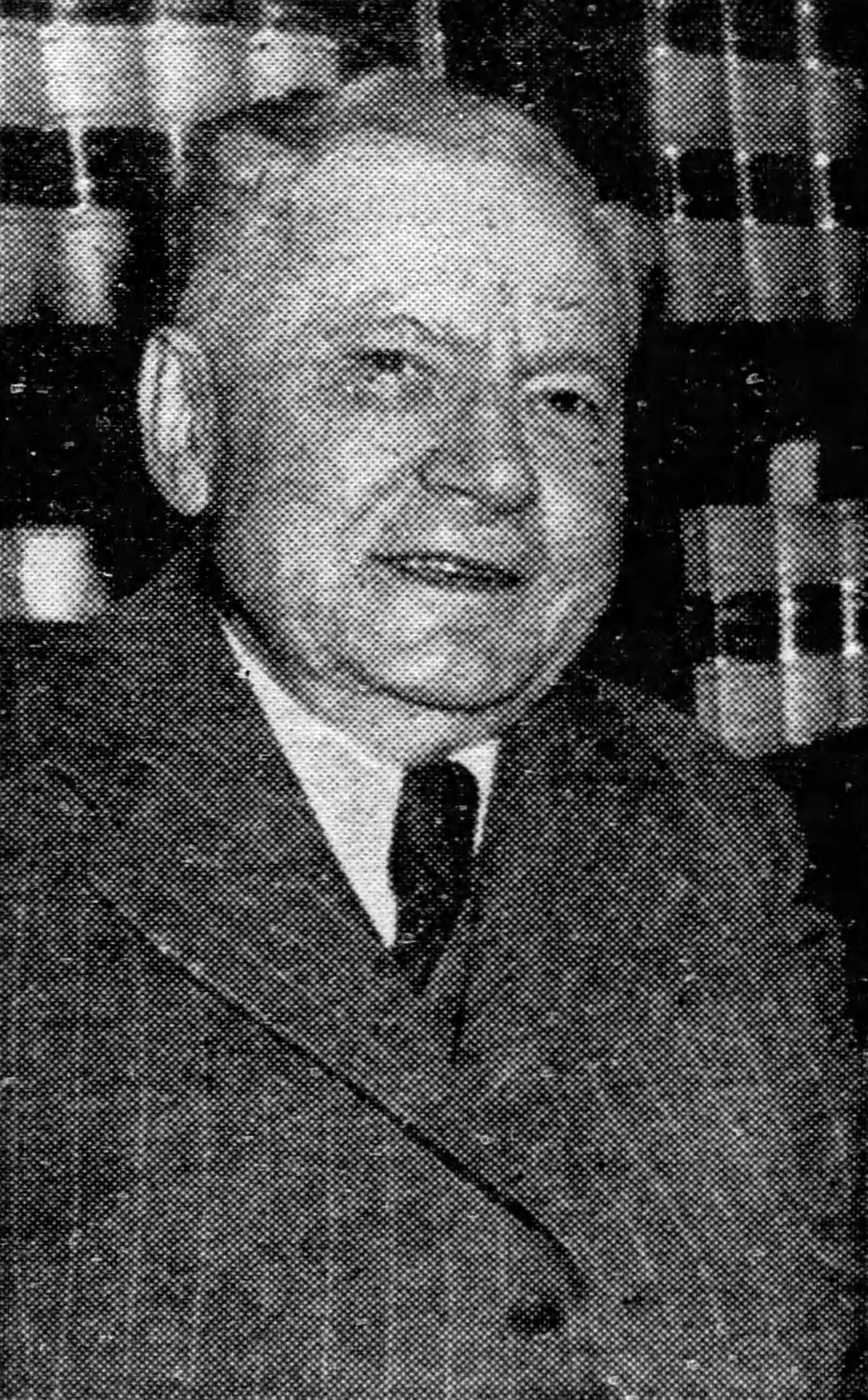
Bone c. 1970

Bone was nominated by President Franklin D. Roosevelt on April 1, 1944, to a seat on the United States Court of Appeals for the Ninth Circuit, which had been vacated by Judge Bert E. Haney. He was confirmed by the United States Senate on April 1, 1944, and received his commission the same day. He assumed senior status on January 1, 1956.

Bone served until his death in Tacoma on March 11, 1970. He had returned to the city in 1968, after living in San Francisco, California since his appointment to the federal bench. He was cremated and his ashes interred in Oakwood Cemetery.

=== Other service ===
While in senior status, Bone engaged in private practice in San Francisco from 1956 to 1968.

Party political offices
Preceded by A. Scott Bullitt	Democratic nominee for U.S. Senator from Washington (Class 3); 1932, 1938	Succeeded by Warren Magnuson
U.S. Senate
Preceded by Elijah S. Grammer	United States Senator (Class 3) from Washington; 1933–1944; Served alongside: Clarence Dill, Lewis B. Schwellenbach, Monrad C. Wallgren	Succeeded by Warren Magnuson
Legal offices
Preceded by Bert E. Haney	Judge of the United States Court of Appeals for the Ninth Circuit; 1944–1956	Succeeded by Frederick George Hamley
