= William H. Doolittle =

American politician

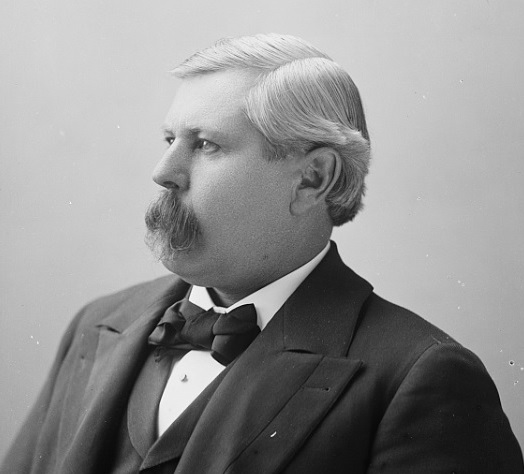

Member of the United States House of Representatives from Washington's at-large congressional district
- In office March 4, 1893 – March 3, 1897
- Preceded by: Seat Created
- Succeeded by: J. Hamilton Lewis

Member of the Nebraska House of Representatives
- In office 1874–1876

Personal details
- Born: November 6, 1848 North East, Pennsylvania
- Died: February 26, 1914 (aged 65) Tacoma, Washington
- Party: Republican
- Occupation: Politician; Lawyer

William Hall Doolittle (November 6, 1848 – February 26, 1914) was a U.S. Representative from Washington.

Doolittle was born near North East in Erie County, Pennsylvania but in 1859, he moved to Portage County, Wisconsin with his parents. He attended the district school. Early in 1865, he enlisted as a private in the Ninth Wisconsin Battery. In 1867, he went to Pennsylvania and pursued an academic course. He studied law in Chautauqua County, New York, and was admitted to the bar in 1871. He moved to Nebraska in 1872 and commenced practice in Tecumseh, Johnson County. From 1874 to 1876, he served as member of the Nebraska State House of Representatives. He served as assistant United States district attorney from 1876 to 1880. He moved to Washington Territory in 1880 and settled in Colfax, Whitman County, engaging in the practice of law. In 1888, he moved to Tacoma. Doolittle was elected as a Republican to the Fifty-third and Fifty-fourth Congresses (March 4, 1893 – March 3, 1897). He was unsuccessful for reelection in 1896 to the Fifty-fifth Congress. After he left office, he resumed the practice of law. He died in Tacoma, Washington, February 26, 1914 and was interred in Tacoma Cemetery.

== Sources ==
- United States Congress. "William H. Doolittle (id: D000430)". Biographical Directory of the United States Congress.

U.S. House of Representatives
Preceded by District created	Member of the U.S. House of Representatives from Washington's at-large congressional district 1893–1897	Succeeded by J. Hamilton Lewis
