= 1926 United States Senate election in Washington =

- November 2, 1926
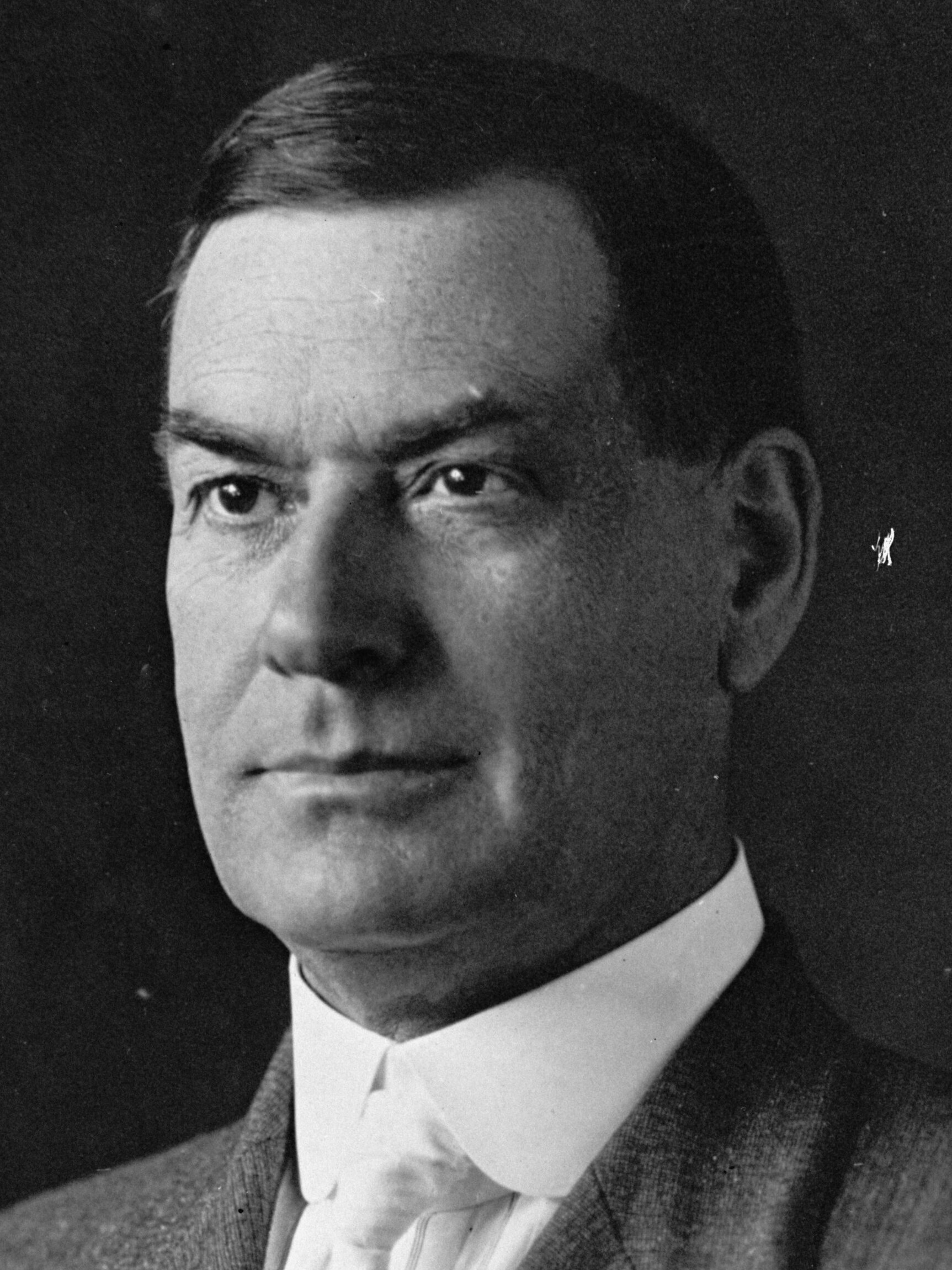

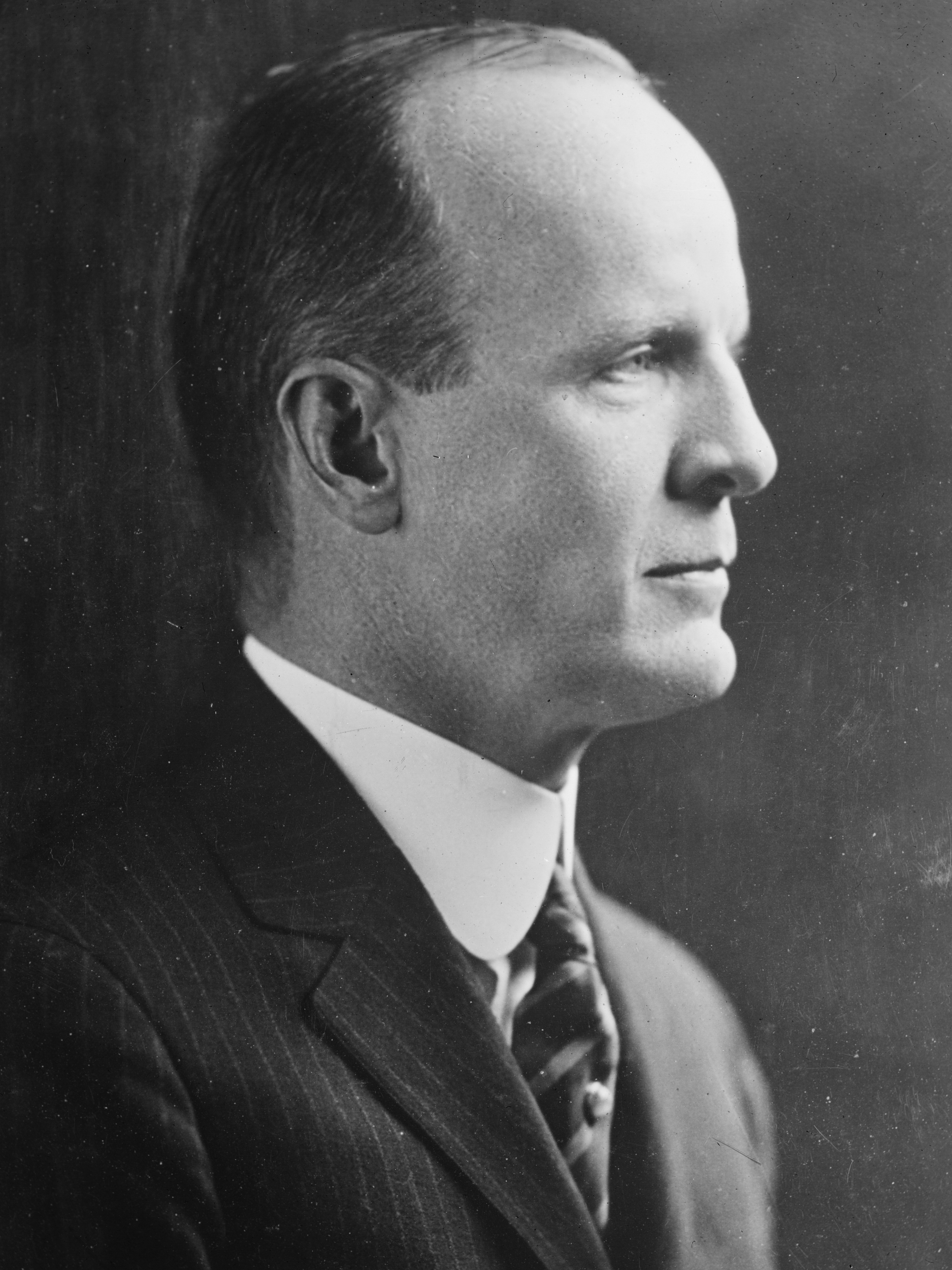
Nominee	Wesley L. Jones	A. Scott Bullitt
Party	Republican	Democratic
Popular vote	164,130	148,783
Percentage	51.31%	46.52%
- County results Jones: 40–50% 50–60% 60–70% 70–80% Bullitt: 50–60%
U.S. senator before election
Wesley Livsey Jones
Republican
Elected U.S. Senator
Wesley Livsey Jones
Republican

The 1926 United States Senate election in Washington was held on November 2, 1926. Incumbent Republican U.S. Senator Wesley Livsey Jones was re-elected to a fourth term in office over Seattle attorney A. Scott Bullitt.

Frank E. Hammond, one of the losing candidates on the Republican side, ran as a "wet" candidate, opposing the prohibition of alcohol, which was already in effect in Washington state, but not yet nationally.

This was the last time until 1980 that Republicans would win the Class 3 Senate seat in Washington.

== Blanket primary ==
=== Candidates ===
==== Democratic ====
- A. Scott Bullitt, Seattle attorney
- James Cleveland Longstreet

==== Republican ====
- Austin E. Griffiths, candidate for Mayor of Seattle in 1916 and U.S. Senate in 1922
- Frank E. Hammond
- Lee Roy Henry
- Wesley Livsey Jones, incumbent Senator since 1909

=== Results ===
1926 U.S. Senate blanket primary
Party	Candidate	Votes	%
Republican	Wesley Livsey Jones (incumbent)	133,893	58.40%
Republican	Austin E. Griffiths	43,611	19.02%
Republican	Frank E. Hammond	29,076	12.68%
Democratic	A. Scott Bullitt	9,523	4.15%
Republican	Lee Roy Henry	9,062	3.95%
Democratic	James C. Longstreet	4,098	1.79%
Total votes		229,263	100.00%

== General election ==
=== Candidates ===
- A. Scott Bullitt, Seattle attorney (Democratic)
- David D. Burgess (Socialist Labor)
- J. L. Freeman (Farmer-Labor)
- Wesley Livsey Jones, incumbent U.S. Senator since 1908 (Republican)

=== Results ===
1926 United States Senate election in Washington
Party	Candidate	Votes	%	±%
Republican	Wesley Livsey Jones (incumbent)	164,130	51.31%	▼5.09
Democratic	A. Scott Bullitt	148,783	46.52%	▲28.72
Socialist Labor	David D. Burgess	3,513	1.10%	N/A
Farmer–Labor	J. L. Freeman	3,437	1.55%	▼24.25
Total votes		319,863	100.00%	
Republican hold		Swing		

== See also ==
- 1926 United States Senate elections
