= Francis W. Cushman =

American politician (1867–1909)

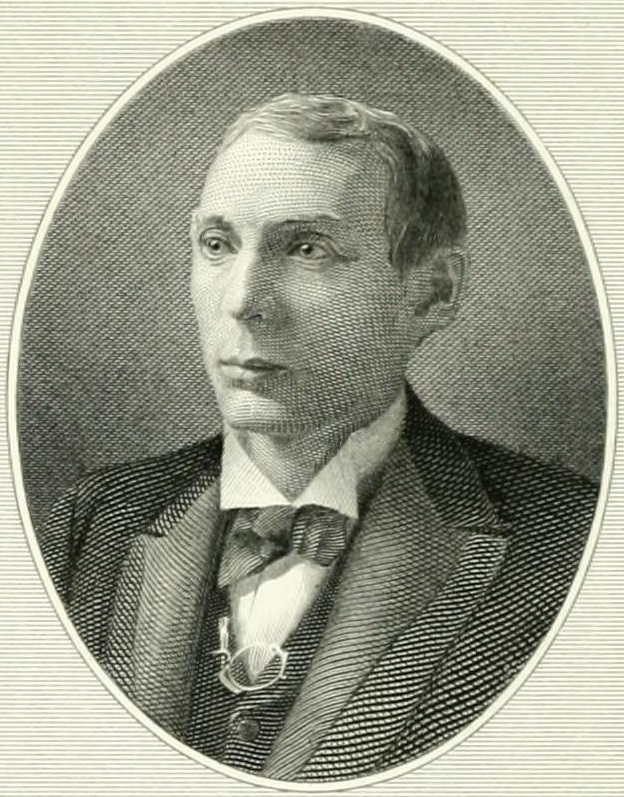
- From 1910's Francis C. Cushman, Late a Representative from Washington

Member of the U.S. House of Representatives from Washington's at-large district
- In office March 4, 1899 – July 6, 1909
- Preceded by: J. Hamilton Lewis

Personal details
- Born: Francis Wellington Cushman; May 8, 1867 Brighton, Iowa, U.S.
- Died: July 6, 1909 (aged 42) New York City, U.S.
- Party: Republican
- Profession: Politician, lawyer

Francis Wellington Cushman (May 8, 1867 – July 6, 1909) was a U.S. representative from Washington.

Born in Brighton, Iowa, Cushman attended public schools in Brighton and Pleasant Plain Academy in Pleasant Plain, Iowa. In 1885, he moved to Albany County, Wyoming, where he worked as a ranch hand and a teacher. He was admitted to the bar in 1889 and began practising law in Bassett, Nebraska.

In 1891, he relocated to Tacoma, Washington, and continued his legal practice. He served as a member of Troop B, First Cavalry, Washington National Guard from 1896 to 1903.

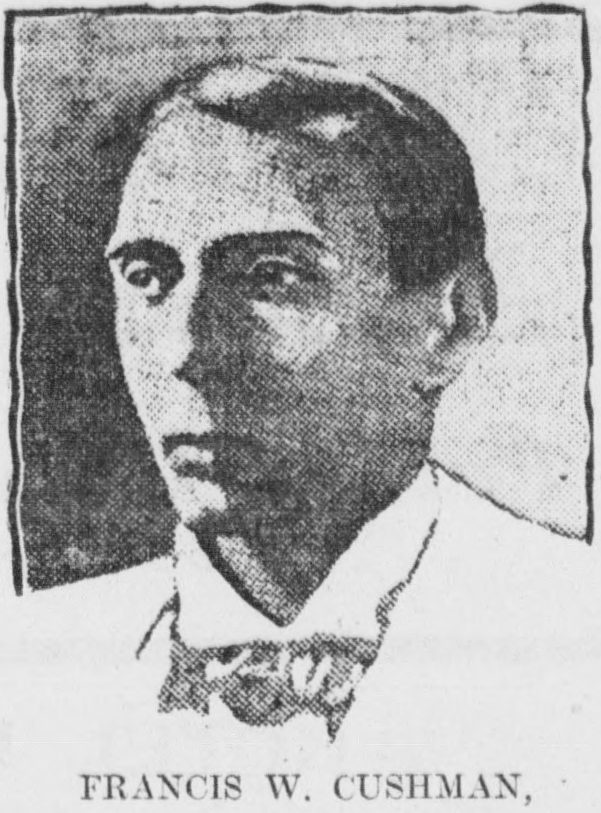
Cushman in 1904

Cushman was elected as a Republican to the Fifty-sixth and to the five succeeding Congresses and served from March 4, 1899, until his death in New York City on July 6, 1909.

In 1908, he argued to keep open Puallup Indian School because of economic benefits, and in 1910 it was renamed Cushman Indian School in his honor.

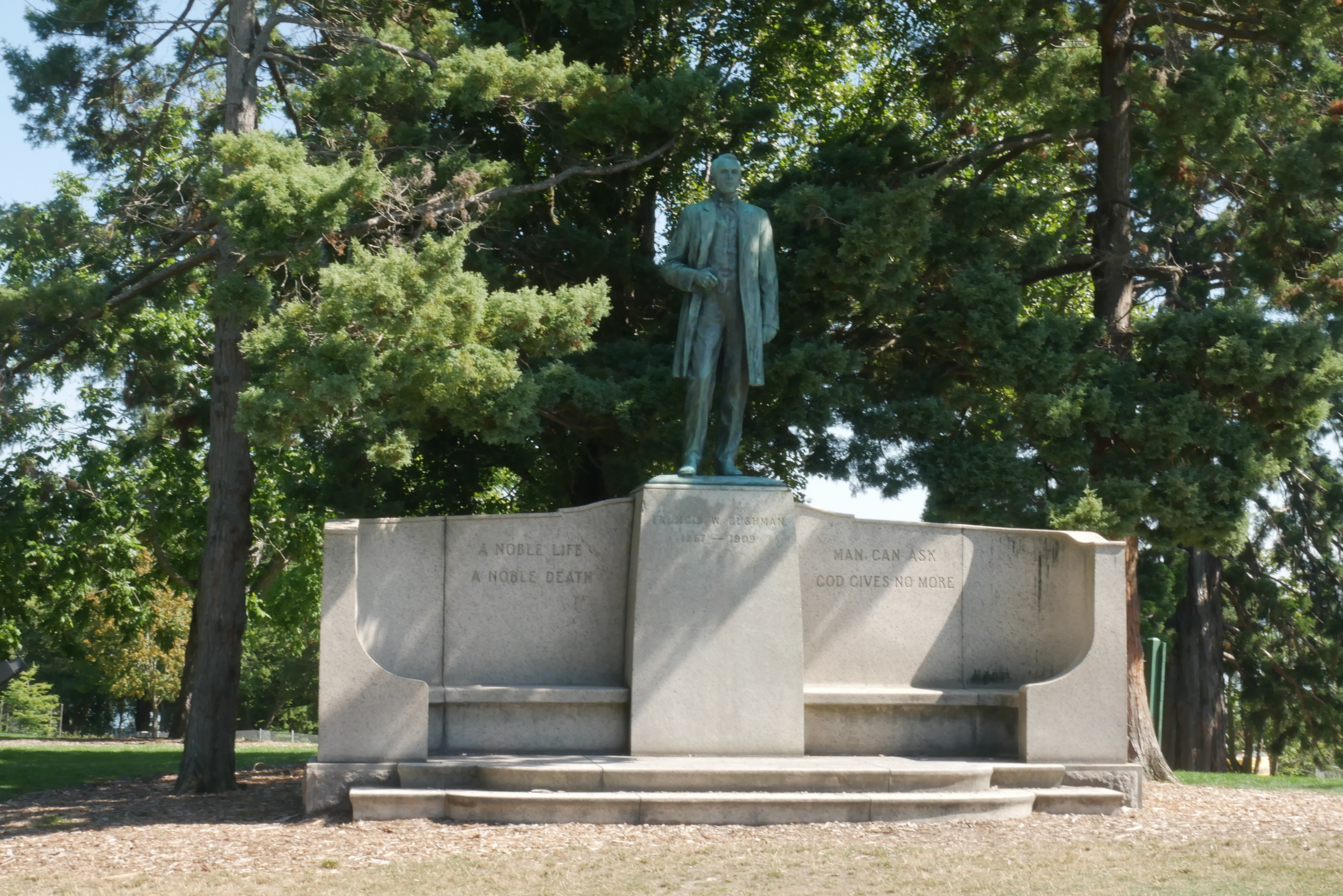
At Point Defiance Park Tacoma, Washington 2018

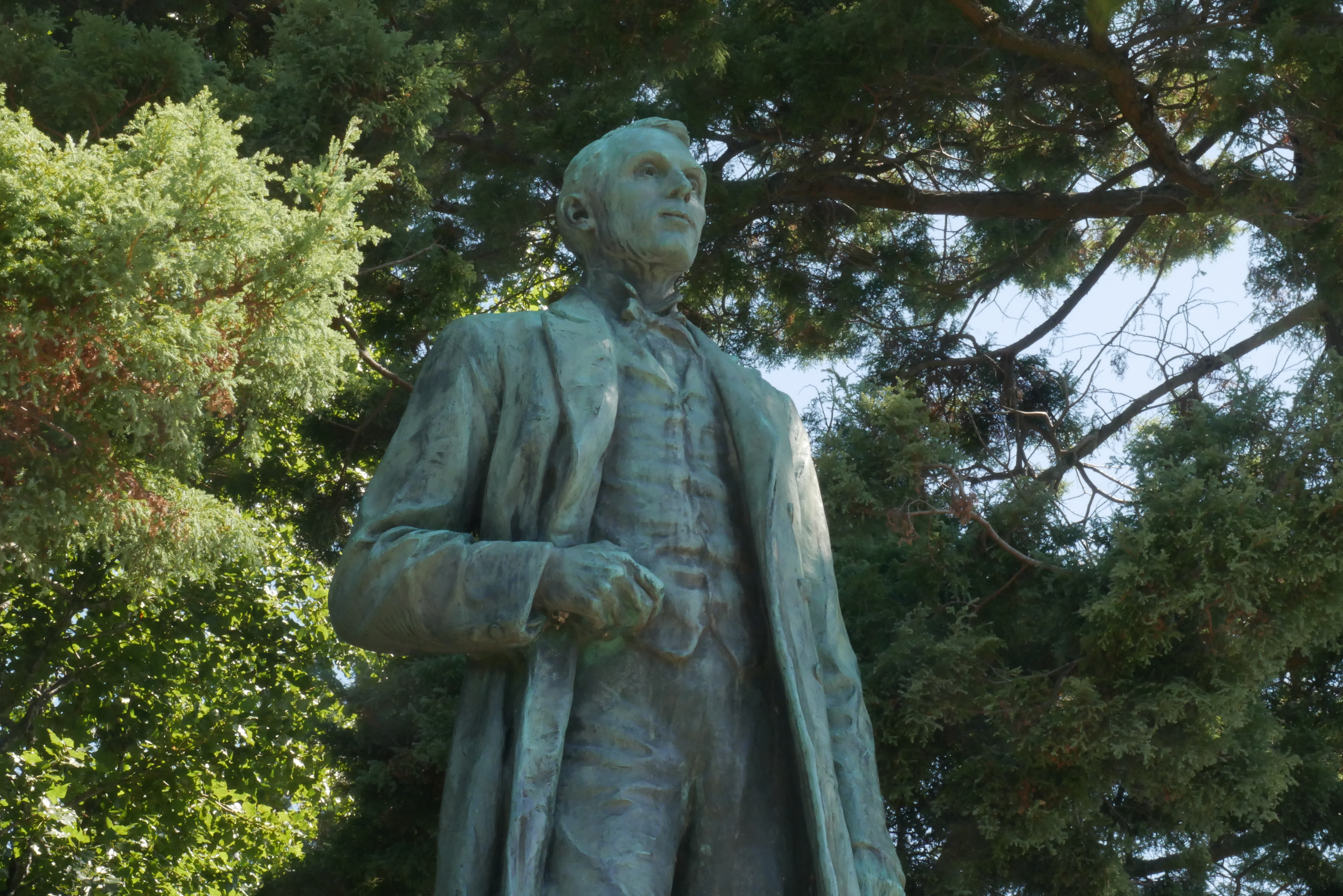
Closeup

== See also ==
- List of members of the United States Congress who died in office (1900–1949)

== Sources ==
- United States Congress. "Francis W. Cushman (id: C001018)". Biographical Directory of the United States Congress.
- Francis W. Cushman, late a Representative from Washington, Memorial addresses delivered in the House of Representatives and Senate frontispiece 1910

U.S. House of Representatives
Preceded by J. Hamilton Lewis	Member of the U.S. House of Representatives from Washington's at-large congressional district March 4, 1899 – July 6, 1909	Succeeded by N/A
