= Alonzo Wilson =

American politician (1868–1949)

Alonzo Edes Wilson (February 5, 1868 – June 18, 1949) was an American journalist who served as a Prohibitionist member during the 44th General Assembly of the Illinois House of Representatives.

== Biographical sketch ==
He was raised and educated in Chicago. In 1896 he was the Prohibition candidate for Secretary of State. He was secretary of the Prohibition State Committee for years and is now chairman. His political record as a Prohibitionist is a long one. At one time he was on the editorial staff of the Chicago Record. Wilson disputed the outcome of the election citing fraud. A House committee sustained Wilson's allegations, ousted Democratic legislator William A. Bowles, and seated Wilson. Wilson took office March 8, 1905. Wilson did not secure reelection in the 1906 general election. Wilson was the Prohibition Party's candidate for United States Senate in 1913.

He was the chairman of the Illinois state affiliate of the Prohibition Party in 1908. Wilson died of a heart attack in Evanston, Illinois on June 18, 1949.
