= Elijah S. Grammer =

American politician (1868–1936)

Elijah Sherman Grammer
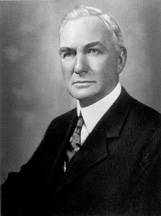

United States Senator from Washington
- In office November 22, 1932 – March 3, 1933
- Appointed by: Roland H. Hartley
- Preceded by: Wesley Livsey Jones
- Succeeded by: Homer Bone

Personal details
- Born: April 3, 1868 Quincy, Missouri, U.S.
- Died: November 19, 1936 (aged 68) Seattle, Washington, U.S.
- Resting place: Lakeview Cemetery, Seattle, Washington, U.S.
- Party: Republican
- Profession: Logging company manager Business executive

Elijah Sherman Grammer (April 3, 1868 – November 19, 1936) was an American lumberman and politician who served as a Republican senator from Washington from November 22, 1932, to March 3, 1933. He was appointed to fill the former seat of Wesley Livsey Jones, who died in office in November 1932.

== Early life and career ==
Grammer was born in rural Quincy, Missouri, on April 3, 1868. He was educated in Missouri and at Bentonville College.

== Career ==
=== Logging and military career ===
He moved to Washington at age 19 in 1887, where he was a logger and then a general manager in logging camps near Tacoma, Washington. After completing additional courses at Bentonville College in 1892, he continued to work in the logging business. He moved to Alaska in 1897 as a general manager of logging camps.

He returned to Washington in 1901, settling in Seattle, which had become the major city in the state. Grammer had ownership interests in several logging companies and other business ventures. From 1916 to 1917 he was president of the Employers’ Association of Washington.

During World War I, Grammer was commissioned as a major in the United States Army. He was assigned responsibility for spruce wood production at the mills in Grays and Willapa harbors.

=== Political career as U.S. Senator ===
A Republican, on November 22, 1932, he was appointed to the United States Senate by Governor Roland H. Hartley, filling the vacancy caused by the death of Wesley L. Jones in office. Jones had been defeated for reelection by Democrat Homer Bone earlier in November, and Grammer held the seat until March 3, 1933. Bone's term began on March 4. Grammer's appointment ensured that the Republicans maintained a majority of one during the Senate session that ran from December 1932 to March 1933.

=== Career after U.S. Senate ===
After completing his Senate service, Grammer resumed his business interests in Seattle. He served as manager of the Admiralty Logging Company and president of the Grammer Investment Company.

== Family and death ==
In 1904, Grammer married Emma Parke Kindley. They had no children, but did act as parents for a niece, Floy Oakley. Grammer died in Seattle on November 19, 1936, and was buried at Lake View Cemetery in Seattle.

== Reflist ==
U.S. Senate
Preceded by Wesley Livsey Jones	United States Senator (Class 3) from Washington; 1932–1933	Succeeded by Homer Truett Bone
