= Puyallup Indian School =

American Indian boarding school

Coordinates: 47°14′16″N 122°24′37″W

The Puyallup Indian School (later named Cushman Indian School) was a government Indian boarding school in Washington State that ran from 1860 to July 1, 1920. The school was located around the intersection of East 29th street and Portland Avenue in Tacoma, Washington.

== Background ==
The Puyallup Indian School was built on the Puyallup Reservation as part of the US government's boarding school program to assimilate Native American children into white society. The Puyallup Indian Agency, when creating the Puyallup Reservation, set aside 598.81 acres of the 17,463 acres for a school, a farm, and associated buildings. The school was originally a one-room building that got two expansions in its sixty years of operation, the first in 1873 and the second in 1898. In the 1873 expansion, the school a facility worth $4,000 that included a carpenter and blacksmith shops. The second expansion in 1898 expanded enrollment from across the pacific northwest and Alaska.

Children were forced to go to the school against their will, through either physical coercion or withholding of their parents' payments or annuity goods. One student, William "Billy" Frank, father of Billy Frank Jr., claimed that in 1880 an agent kidnapped him from his home to force him to go to the school.

Attendance was sparse at times, epidemics were a huge problem on reservations, especially on the children. A 1880s census showed the number of children half that of families.

On October 26, 1888, a second Indian school opened, just outside the northern border of the reservation, named the St. George's Industrial School, also known as the St. George's Indian School, that had a focus on Catholic studies.

The students were required to wear a uniform consisting of blue jersey and military caps.

== People ==
=== Henry Sicade ===
From 1873 to 1880, Henry Sicade attended the Puyallup Indian School. He was the great-nephew of Leschi (Nisqually) and the grandson of Chief Stann of the Puyallup Tribe. Due to his hardships at the school, he went on to help start the Fife Public Schools as an alternative education for native children in the area. He described an average diet of cornmeal mush, bread, and molasses.

=== Edwin L. Chalcraft ===
In the years 1889–1894, Edwin L. Chalcraft was the school's superintendent. He left a documented history of his time as superintendent, written later in life.

Among other things, Chalcraft described a couple of informal social experiments he conducted on the children under his care. The first was on May 5, 1892, while noticing that the school uniforms resemble army uniforms, he started a self-governing experiment. He assigned the boys like a military company, including one captain, two sergeants, one quarter-master sergeant, and four corporals. The higher ranked children were in charge of the lower ranking children, during their chores and free time. If someone broke a school rule, they were issued a court martial. The court martial, overseen by Chalcraft, the "captain", and three "officers" appointed by the "captain" on duty at the time. Chalcraft considered this experiment a success and continued it until he left in 1894.

The second experiment was an anonymous system of students telling on one another. There was a library on the second floor that had little supervision due to its distance from adults. Chalcraft complained of children misusing the room to play, not read. To fix this, he set up a board with cards that had students names on them. If a student witnessed another student misusing the room, they were to take their card and bring it down to Chalcraft's desk. If your card was missing, you were to go to Chalcraft's office to retrieve it. Chalcraft himself brought up the possibility of students with have grudges against other students abusing the system, but he brushed it off.

=== Robert H. Milroy ===
Robert Milroy was the superintendent of Indian Affairs in Washington Territory from 1872 to 1885 after a career spent fighting in the American Civil War. He believed the main purpose of schools like the Puyallup Indian School were to assimilate Indian children into white society. He constantly butted heads with Congress over funding to keep Puyallup and Chehalis Indian Schools open, claiming that "stopping the schools is really stopping the machinery of civilization and is a calamity." and that the schools were used to "stop raising generations of worthless and costly savages.".

== Epidemics ==
The Puyallup Indian School was plagued by illnesses. In 1882, a measles outbreak caused the school to close.

In the winter of 1917–1918, students returning to the school from Christmas vacation brought in measles. A month later meningitis made the rounds, resulting in the death of a student named Edward Long on January 31. Two more deaths happened that year, Leon Boncheau on March 3 from bronchial pneumonia and Isabel Law on May 18 of valvular heart disease.

In 1918, an Influenza outbreak in early October caused the school to go into quarantine, halting much needed additional hiring. Before the outbreak, the school's hospital had only forty-five beds, one doctor and one nurse on staff. The first student recorded dying from influenza was on October 19. His name was Celestine Pichette and he was from the Colville Indian Reservation. Despite the quarantine, Celestine had run away to Seattle and was caught, then brought back to the school, unknowingly bringing the virus back with him. Two students died on October 24, Frank Tom from Alaska and Alice La Fleur. Alice had gone to the hospital on October 17, but was diagnosed with only a common cold by the school's Dr. Kinnear. He saw her the day before she died and deemed her in "satisfactory condition and there was no reason for alarm".

On October 26 two other students died, Thomas Curlew and Mary Kowoosh from La Push, Washington. Hammond wrote to Mary's mother, informing her that he was sending her daughter's body in a casket to Port Gamble, Washington and that she would have to pay the $90 shipping.

Joseph Simpson died on November 7 and Ernest Crofoot on November 8. Raymond Hoebucket died on December 9 and was buried in the school cemetery.

The quarantine was lifted by the third week of December, but Superintendent Hammond did not permit the children to go home for the Christmas break. Instead he provided a turkey dinner Christmas night, along with games and a movie.

A second wave of influenza hit the school in February 1919, placing the school under a second quarantine that lasted for eight weeks and was lifted March 15.

== Education ==
The main focus of the school was vocational education. The goal was to strip Indians of their culture and assimilate them into American culture.

Studies between boys and girls differed. Girls focused on domestic studies, including cooking, cleaning, sewing, and other household chores. In the 1880s, funding for Indian schools across the country were getting cut, so student labor, namely girls labor, was used to save money.

== Cushman Indian School ==
In 1908, the Office of Indian Affairs attempted to close the school due to low attendance, but Washington State congressman Francis W. Cushman stepped in and argued for the economic benefits of the school. In 1910 the school was renamed in his honor as Cushman Indian School with a focus on vocational and industrial training. The students were split between boys and girls. The boys' education consisted of gardening, carpentry, machine shop, blacksmithing, steam and electrical engineering, and plumbing. The girls' education focused on domestic studies including cooking, cleaning, ironing, sewing, and general housekeeping. Students and alumni served with the 91st Infantry Division in France during WWI. The war caused a strain on the school. Students were pulled from the school to higher paying jobs in lumber and shipyards due to the war effort. Inflation was also a problem, since staff were leaving for more lucrative jobs. Employees that did stay on were forced to take on more duties to cover for the vacant positions.

== Closure ==
The school closed on July 1, 1920. One of the factors that led to the closure was low attendance. Children ran away from the school at a steady rate in the last few years:

- academic year 1916-1917: 22 truants
- academic year 1917-1918: 31 truants
- academic year 1918-1919: 73 truants
- academic year 1919-1920: 10 truants

A combination of the influenza outbreak, lack of staffing, and political pressure to lower the federal budget were all factors in the school's closure for good. The remaining students who were orphans were transferred to Chemawa Indian School in Salem, Oregon.

== Cushman Indian Hospital ==
After the school's closure in 1920, it became the Cushman Indian Hospital (aka the Tacoma Indian Hospital) until the 1960s.
