= 1914 United States Senate election in Washington =

- November 3, 1914
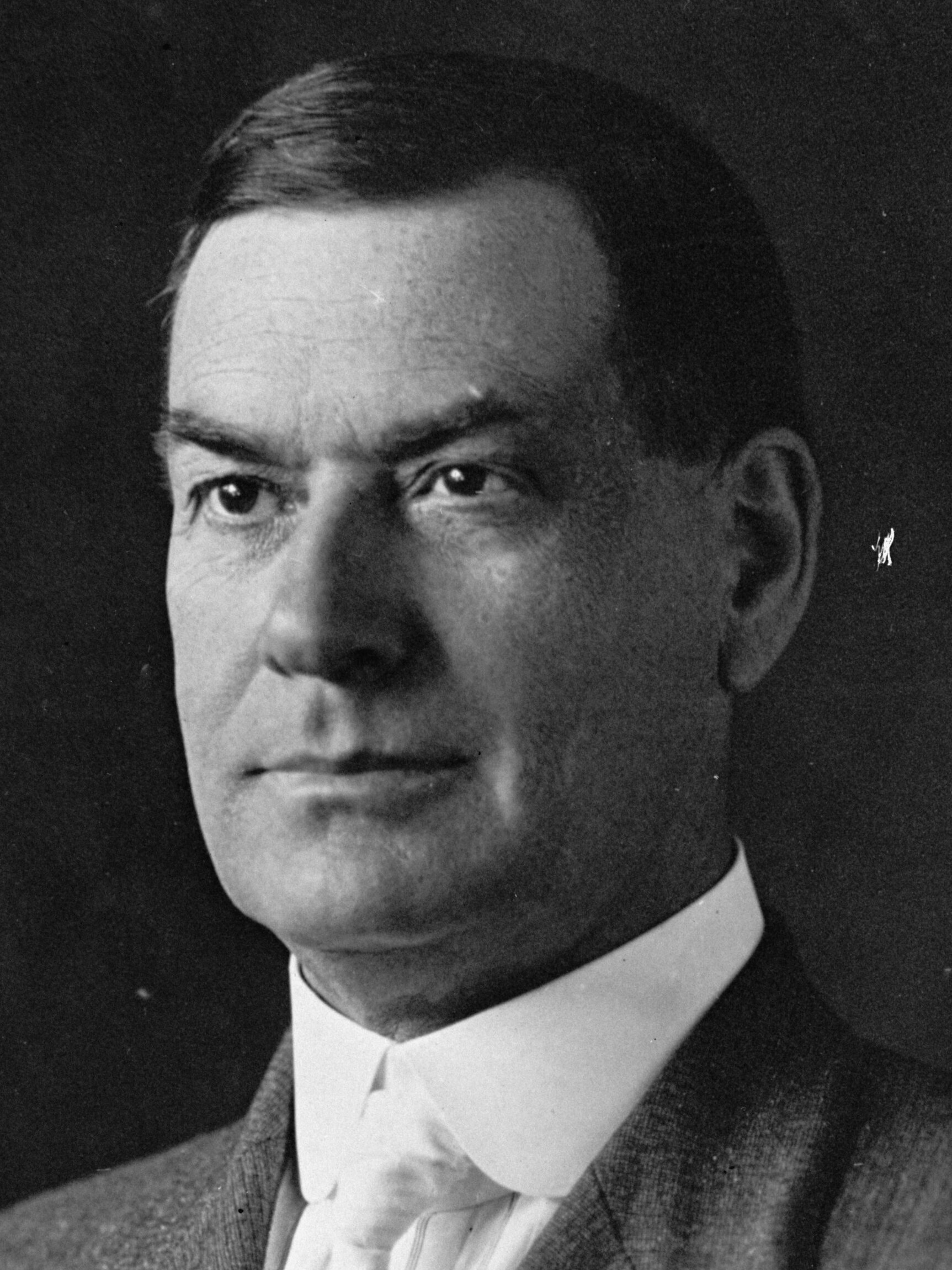

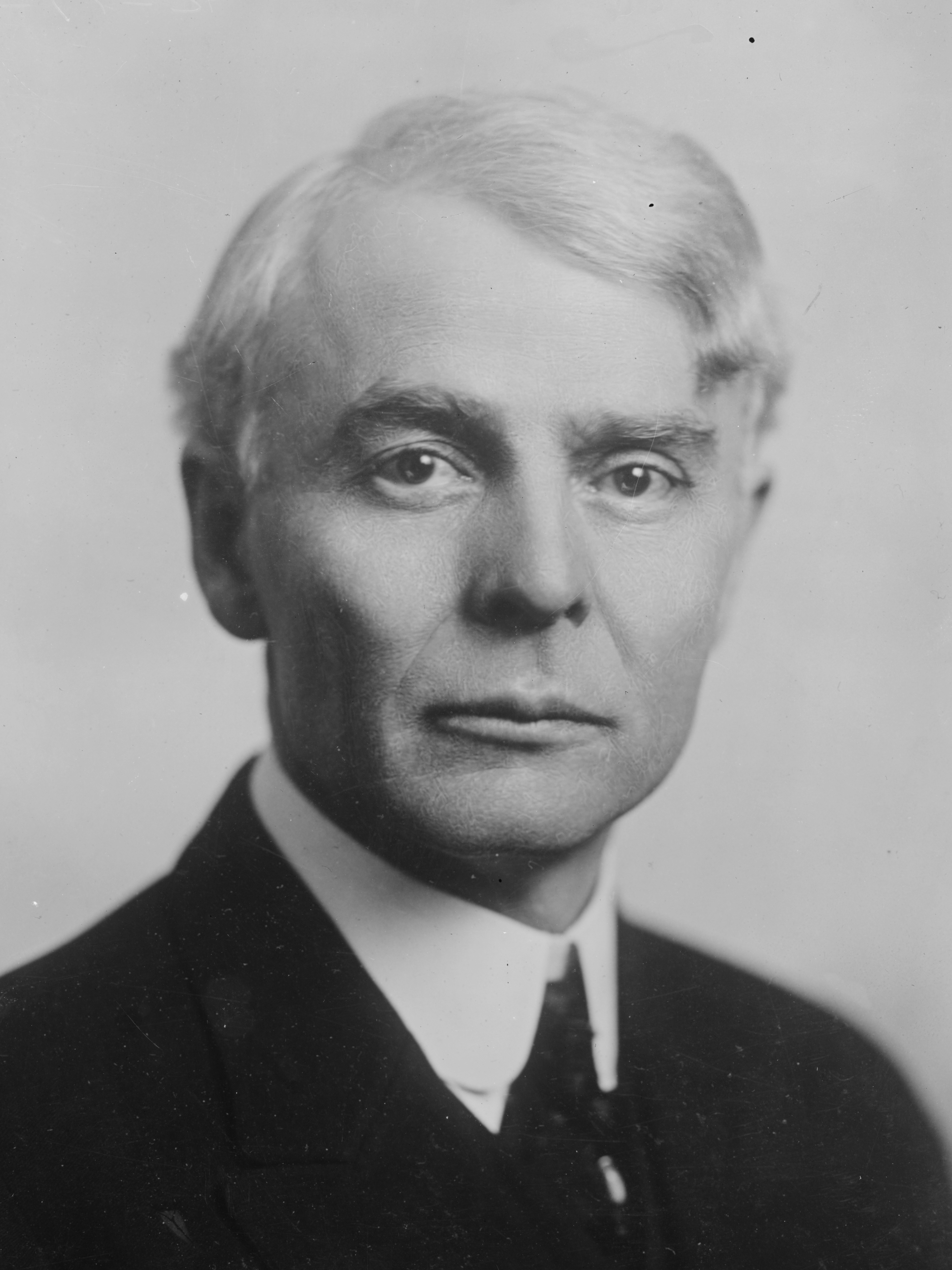

Nominee	Wesley L. Jones	William Wilson Black
Party	Republican	Democratic
Popular vote	130,479	91,733
Percentage	37.79%	26.57%
Nominee	Ole Hanson	Adam H. Barth
Party	Progressive	Socialist
Popular vote	83,282	30,234
Percentage	24.12%	8.76%
- County results Jones: 20–30% 30–40% 40–50% 50–60% 60–70% Black: 30–40% 40–50% Hanson: 20–30% 30–40%
U.S. senator before election
Wesley Livsey Jones
Republican
Elected U.S. Senator
Wesley Livsey Jones
Republican

The 1914 United States Senate election in Washington was held on November 3, 1914. Incumbent Republican U.S. Senator Wesley Livsey Jones was re-elected to a second term in office in a three-way race with William Wilson Black and Ole Hanson. This election was the first time since 1891 that an incumbent Republican Senator from Washington was re-elected or won re-election.

== Blanket primary ==
=== Candidates ===
==== Democratic ====
- William Wilson Black
- George F. Cotterill, former Mayor of Seattle
- George Turner, former U.S. Senator

==== Progressive ====
- Jacob Falconer, U.S. Representative at-large and former Speaker of the Washington House of Representatives
- Ole Hanson, former State Representative from Seattle (1908–1909)

==== Republican ====
- Wesley Livsey Jones, incumbent Senator since 1909

==== Socialist ====
- Adam H. Barth

=== Results ===
1914 U.S. Senate blanket primary
Party	Candidate	Votes	%
Republican	Wesley Livsey Jones (incumbent)	66,800	42.11%
Progressive	Ole Hanson	15,552	9.80%
Progressive	Jacob Falconer	13,956	8.80%
Democratic	William Wilson Black	12,550	7.91%
Democratic	George Turner	12,535	7.90%
Democratic	George F. Cotterill	10,093	6.36%
Democratic	Hugh C. Todd	8,903	5.61%
Socialist	Adam H. Barth	5,692	3.59%
Progressive	A.V. Fawcett	5,609	3.54%
Democratic	James H. Dege	3,787	2.39%
Progressive	Lewis J. Kreger	3,170	2.00%
Total votes		158,647	100.00%

== General election ==
=== Candidates ===
- Adam H. Barth (Socialist)
- Arthur S. Caton (Prohibition)
- William Wilson Black (Democratic)
- Ole Hanson, former State Representative from Seattle (Progressive)
- Wesley Livsey Jones, incumbent U.S. Senator since 1909 (Republican)

=== Results ===
1914 United States Senate election in Washington
Party	Candidate	Votes	%
Republican	Wesley Livsey Jones (incumbent)	130,479	37.79%
Democratic	William Wilson Black	91,733	26.57%
Progressive	Ole Hanson	83,282	24.12%
Socialist	Adam H. Barth	30,234	8.76%
Prohibition	Arthur S. Caton	9,551	2.77%
Total votes		345,279	100.00%
Republican hold			

== See also ==
- 1914 United States Senate elections
