= List of elections in Iceland =

This is a list of elections in Iceland.

== List ==
Year	Parliament	Municipalities	President
Colony
1844	Parliament 1844		
1852	Parliament 1852		
1858	Parliament 1858		
1864	Parliament 1864		
1869	Parliament 1869		
1874	Parliament 1874		
1880	Parliament 1880		
1886	Parliament 1886		
1892	Parliament 1892		
1894	Parliament 1894		
1900	Parliament 1900		
1902	Parliament 1902		
1903	Parliament 1903		
1904	Parliament 1904		
1908	Parliament 1908		
1911	Parliament 1911		
1914	Parliament 1914		
1916	Parliament 1916 (Aug)		
1916	Parliament 1916 (Oct)		
Kingdom
1919	Parliament 1919		
1922	Parliament 1922		
1923	Parliament 1923		
1926	Parliament 1926		
1927	Parliament 1927		
1930	Parliament 1930	Municipalities 1930	
1931	Parliament 1931	Municipalities 1930	
1933	Parliament 1933	Municipalities 1930	
1934	Parliament 1934	Municipalities 1934	
1937	Parliament 1937	Municipalities 1934	
1938	Parliament 1937	Municipalities 1938	
1942	Parliament 1942 (Jul)	Municipalities 1942	
1942	Parliament 1942 (Oct)	Municipalities 1942	
Republic
1944			President 1944
1945			President 1945
1946	Parliament 1946	Municipalities 1946	President 1945
1949	Parliament 1949	Municipalities 1946	President 1949
1950	Parliament 1949	Municipalities 1950	President 1949
1952	Parliament 1949	Municipalities 1950	President 1952
1953	Parliament 1953	Municipalities 1950	President 1952
1954	Parliament 1953	Municipalities 1954	President 1952
1956	Parliament 1956	Municipalities 1954	President 1956
1958	Parliament 1956	Municipalities 1958	President 1956
1959	Parliament 1959 (Jun)	Municipalities 1958	President 1956
1959	Parliament 1959 (Oct)	Municipalities 1958	President 1956
1960	Parliament 1959 (Oct)	Municipalities 1958	President 1960
1962	Parliament 1959 (Oct)	Municipalities 1962	President 1960
1963	Parliament 1963	Municipalities 1962	President 1960
1964	Parliament 1963	Municipalities 1962	President 1964
1966	Parliament 1963	Municipalities 1966	President 1964
1967	Parliament 1967	Municipalities 1966	President 1964
1968	Parliament 1967	Municipalities 1966	President 1968
1970	Parliament 1967	Municipalities 1970	President 1968
1971	Parliament 1971	Municipalities 1970	President 1968
1972	Parliament 1971	Municipalities 1970	President 1972
1974	Parliament 1974	Municipalities 1974	President 1972
1976	Parliament 1974	Municipalities 1974	President 1976
1978	Parliament 1978	Municipalities 1978	President 1976
1979	Parliament 1979	Municipalities 1978	President 1976
1980	Parliament 1979	Municipalities 1978	President 1980
1982	Parliament 1979	Municipalities 1982	President 1980
1983	Parliament 1983	Municipalities 1982	President 1980
1984	Parliament 1983	Municipalities 1982	President 1984
1986	Parliament 1983	Municipalities 1986	President 1984
1987	Parliament 1987	Municipalities 1986	President 1984
1988	Parliament 1987	Municipalities 1986	President 1988
1990	Parliament 1987	Municipalities 1990	President 1988
1991	Parliament 1991	Municipalities 1990	President 1988
1992	Parliament 1991	Municipalities 1990	President 1992
1994	Parliament 1991	Municipalities 1994	President 1992
1995	Parliament 1995	Municipalities 1994	President 1992
1996	Parliament 1995	Municipalities 1994	President 1996
1998	Parliament 1995	Municipalities 1998	President 1996
1999	Parliament 1999	Municipalities 1998	President 1996
2000	Parliament 1999	Municipalities 1998	President 2000
2002	Parliament 1999	Municipalities 2002	President 2000
2003	Parliament 2003	Municipalities 2002	President 2000
2004	Parliament 2003	Municipalities 2002	President 2004
2006	Parliament 2003	Municipalities 2006	President 2004
2007	Parliament 2007	Municipalities 2006	President 2004
2008	Parliament 2007	Municipalities 2006	President 2008
2009	Parliament 2009	Municipalities 2006	President 2008
2010	Parliament 2009	Municipalities 2010	President 2008
2012	Parliament 2009	Municipalities 2010	President 2012
2013	Parliament 2013	Municipalities 2010	President 2012
2014	Parliament 2013	Municipalities 2014	President 2012
2016	Parliament 2016	Municipalities 2014	President 2016
2017	Parliament 2017	Municipalities 2014	President 2016
2018	Parliament 2017	Municipalities 2018	President 2016
2020	Parliament 2017	Municipalities 2018	President 2020
2021	Parliament 2021	Municipalities 2018	President 2020
2022	Parliament 2021	Municipalities 2022	President 2020
2024	Parliament 2024	Municipalities 2022	President 2024
2026	Parliament 2024	Municipalities 2026	President 2024
