= List of elections in 1914 =

The following elections occurred in the year 1914.

== Africa ==
- 1914 Southern Rhodesian Legislative Council election

== Asia ==
- 1914 Ottoman general election
- 1914 Persian legislative election

== Europe ==
- 1914 Belgian general election
- 1914 Bulgarian parliamentary election
- 1914 Faroese general election
- 1914 French legislative election
- 1914 Icelandic parliamentary election
- 1914 Liechtenstein general election
- 1914 Luxembourg general election
- 1914 Montenegrin parliamentary election
- 1914 Ottoman general election
- 1914 Papal conclave
- 1914 Romanian general election
- 1914 Spanish general election
- March 1914 Swedish general election
- September 1914 Swedish general election
- 1914 Swiss federal election
- 1914 Swiss constitutional referendum

== North America ==
=== Canada ===
- 1914 Edmonton municipal election
- 1914 Manitoba general election
- 1914 Ontario general election
- 1914 Toronto municipal election

=== Caribbean ===
- 1914 Dominican Republic general election

=== United States ===
- 1914 New York state election
- 1914 United States elections

==== United States lieutenant gubernatorial ====
- 1914 California lieutenant gubernatorial election
- 1914 Connecticut lieutenant gubernatorial election
- 1914 Minnesota lieutenant gubernatorial election
- 1914 Nebraska lieutenant gubernatorial election
- 1914 Texas lieutenant gubernatorial election
- 1914 Wisconsin lieutenant gubernatorial election

==== United States gubernatorial ====
- 1914 Alabama gubernatorial election
- 1914 Arizona gubernatorial election
- 1914 Arkansas gubernatorial election
- 1914 California gubernatorial election
- 1914 Colorado gubernatorial election
- 1914 Connecticut gubernatorial election
- 1914 Georgia gubernatorial election
- 1914 Idaho gubernatorial election
- 1914 Iowa gubernatorial election
- 1914 Kansas gubernatorial election
- 1914 Maine gubernatorial election
- 1914 Massachusetts gubernatorial election
- 1914 Michigan gubernatorial election
- 1914 Minnesota gubernatorial election
- 1914 Nebraska gubernatorial election
- 1914 Nevada gubernatorial election
- 1914 New Hampshire gubernatorial election
- 1914 New York gubernatorial election
- 1914 North Dakota gubernatorial election
- 1914 Ohio gubernatorial election
- 1914 Oklahoma gubernatorial election
- 1914 Oregon gubernatorial election
- 1914 Pennsylvania gubernatorial election
- 1914 Rhode Island gubernatorial election
- 1914 South Carolina gubernatorial election
- 1914 South Dakota gubernatorial election
- 1914 Tennessee gubernatorial election
- 1914 Texas gubernatorial election
- 1914 United States gubernatorial elections
- 1914 Vermont gubernatorial election
- 1914 Wisconsin gubernatorial election
- 1914 Wyoming gubernatorial election

==== United States House of Representatives ====
- 1914 United States House of Representatives elections
- 1914 United States House of Representatives election in Arizona
- 1914 United States House of Representatives elections in California
- 1914 United States House of Representatives elections in Oklahoma
- 1914 United States House of Representatives elections in South Carolina

==== United States Senate ====
- 1914 United States Senate elections
- 1914 United States Senate election in Alabama
- 1914 United States Senate special election in Alabama
- 1914 United States Senate election in Arizona
- 1914 United States Senate election in California
- 1914 United States Senate election in Colorado
- 1914 United States Senate election in Connecticut
- 1914 United States Senate election in Idaho
- 1914 United States Senate election in Illinois
- 1914 United States Senate election in Indiana
- 1914 United States Senate election in Iowa
- 1914 United States Senate election in Kansas
- 1914 United States Senate election in Kentucky
- 1914 United States Senate election in Maryland
- 1914 United States Senate election in Missouri
- 1914 United States Senate election in New Hampshire
- 1914 United States Senate election in New York
- 1914 United States Senate election in North Carolina
- 1914 United States Senate election in North Dakota
- 1914 United States Senate election in Ohio
- 1914 United States Senate election in Oklahoma
- 1914 United States Senate election in Pennsylvania
- 1914 United States Senate election in South Carolina
- 1914 United States Senate election in South Dakota
- 1914 United States Senate election in Vermont
- 1914 United States Senate election in Washington

==== United States mayoral elections ====
- 1914 Boston mayoral election
- 1914 Milwaukee mayoral election
- 1914 Manchester, New Hampshire mayoral election

== South America ==
- 1914 Argentine legislative election
- 1914 Bolivian legislative election
- 1914 Brazilian presidential election
- 1914 Colombian presidential election

== Oceania ==
=== Australia ===
- 1914 Australian Senate election
- 1914 Adelaide by-election
- 1914 Australian federal election
- 1914 Canterbury state by-election
- 1914 Kalgoorlie state by-election
- 1914 Korong state by-election
- 1914 Western Australian state election
- 1914 Victorian state election

=== New Zealand ===
- 1914 New Zealand general election

== See also ==
- Category:1914 elections
