= List of elections in 1916 =

The following elections occurred in the year 1916.

== Asia ==
- 1916 Hong Kong sanitary board election
- 1916 Philippine House of Representatives elections
- 1916 Philippine Senate elections

== Europe ==
- 1916 Faroese general election
- 1916 Finnish parliamentary election
- 1916 Spanish general election

=== United Kingdom ===
- 1916 Abingdon by-election
- 1916 Ashton-under-Lyne by-election
- 1916 Berwick-upon-Tweed by-election
- 1916 Bolton by-election
- 1916 Bradford Central by-election
- 1916 Chesterton by-election
- 1916 Colne Valley by-election
- 1916 Derby by-election
- 1916 Edinburgh and St Andrews Universities by-election
- 1916 Harborough by-election
- 1916 Hyde by-election
- 1916 Liverpool East Toxteth by-election
- 1916 Mansfield by-election
- 1916 North Louth by-election
- 1916 North West Staffordshire by-election
- 1916 Portsmouth by-election
- 1916 Rotherham by-election
- 1916 Sheffield Hallam by-election
- 1916 South Shields by-election
- 1916 St George's, Hanover Square by-election
- 1916 Whitechapel by-election
- 1916 Widnes by-election
- 1916 Wimbledon by-election
- 1916 Winchester by-election

== North America ==
=== Canada ===
- 1916 British Columbia general election
- 1916 Edmonton municipal election
- 1916 Nova Scotia general election
- 1916 Quebec general election
- 1916 Toronto municipal election

=== Caribbean ===
- 1916 Cuban general election

=== United States ===
- 1916 New York state election
- 1916 United States elections
- 1916 United States presidential election

==== United States lieutenant gubernatorial ====
- 1916 Connecticut lieutenant gubernatorial election
- 1916 Illinois lieutenant gubernatorial election
- 1916 Minnesota lieutenant gubernatorial election
- 1916 Missouri lieutenant gubernatorial election
- 1916 Nebraska lieutenant gubernatorial election
- 1916 Texas lieutenant gubernatorial election
- 1916 Wisconsin lieutenant gubernatorial election

==== United States gubernatorial ====
- 1916 Arizona gubernatorial election
- 1916 Arkansas gubernatorial election
- 1916 Colorado gubernatorial election
- 1916 Connecticut gubernatorial election
- 1916 Delaware gubernatorial election
- 1916 Florida gubernatorial election
- 1916 Georgia gubernatorial election
- 1916 Idaho gubernatorial election
- 1916 Illinois gubernatorial election
- 1916 Indiana gubernatorial election
- 1916 Iowa gubernatorial election
- 1916 Kansas gubernatorial election
- 1916 Louisiana gubernatorial election
- 1916 Maine gubernatorial election
- 1916 Massachusetts gubernatorial election
- 1916 Michigan gubernatorial election
- 1916 Minnesota gubernatorial election
- 1916 Missouri gubernatorial election
- 1916 Montana gubernatorial election
- 1916 Nebraska gubernatorial election
- 1916 New Hampshire gubernatorial election
- 1916 New Jersey gubernatorial election
- 1916 New Mexico gubernatorial election
- 1916 New York gubernatorial election
- 1916 North Carolina gubernatorial election
- 1916 North Dakota gubernatorial election
- 1916 Ohio gubernatorial election
- 1916 Rhode Island gubernatorial election
- 1916 South Carolina gubernatorial election
- 1916 South Dakota gubernatorial election
- 1916 Tennessee gubernatorial election
- 1916 Texas gubernatorial election
- 1916 United States gubernatorial elections
- 1916 Utah gubernatorial election
- 1916 Vermont gubernatorial election
- 1916 Washington gubernatorial election
- 1916 West Virginia gubernatorial election
- 1916 Wisconsin gubernatorial election

==== United States House of Representatives ====
- 1916 United States House of Representatives elections
- 1916 United States House of Representatives elections in California
- 1916 United States House of Representatives elections in Oklahoma
- 1916 United States House of Representatives elections in South Carolina

==== United States Senate ====
- 1916 United States Senate elections
- 1916 United States Senate election in Arizona
- 1916 United States Senate election in California
- 1916 United States Senate election in Connecticut
- 1916 United States Senate election in Delaware
- 1916 United States Senate election in Florida
- 1916 United States Senate election in Indiana
- 1916 United States Senate special election in Indiana
- 1916 United States Senate election in Maine
- 1916 United States Senate election in Maryland
- 1916 United States Senate election in Massachusetts
- 1916 United States Senate election in Michigan
- 1916 United States Senate election in Minnesota
- 1916 United States Senate election in Missouri
- 1916 United States Senate election in Montana
- 1916 United States Senate election in Nebraska
- 1916 United States Senate election in New Jersey
- 1916 United States Senate election in New York
- 1916 United States Senate election in North Dakota
- 1916 United States Senate election in Ohio
- 1916 United States Senate election in Pennsylvania
- 1916 United States Senate election in Tennessee
- 1916 United States Senate election in Texas
- 1916 United States Senate election in Vermont
- 1916 United States Senate election in Washington
- 1916 United States Senate election in Wisconsin
- 1916 United States Senate election in Wyoming

==== United States mayoral elections ====
- 1916 Milwaukee mayoral election
- 1916 Manchester, New Hampshire mayoral election

== South America ==
- 1916 Argentine general election
- 1916 Bolivian legislative election
- 1916 Ecuadorian presidential election
- 1916 Guatemalan presidential election
- 1916 Nicaraguan general election
- 1916 Panamanian presidential election
- 1916 Uruguayan Constitutional Assembly election

== Oceania ==
=== Australia ===
- 1916 Australian plebiscite
- 1916 Bingara state by-election
- 1916 Coolgardie state by-election
- 1916 Drummoyne state by-election
- 1916 Parramatta state by-election
- 1916 Tasmanian state election

=== New Zealand ===
- 1916 Pahiatua by-election

== See also ==
- Category:1916 elections
