= 1924 United States presidential election in California =

- November 4, 1924
- Turnout: 73.34% (of registered voters) ▲1.47 pp 48.53% (of eligible voters) ▲1.27 pp

Nominee	Calvin Coolidge	Robert M. La Follette	John W. Davis
Party	Republican	Socialist (Note: Although La Follette ran under his own Progressive Party nationally, he ran in California under the endorsement of the Socialist Party of America and the "Committee for Progressive Political Action".)	Democratic
Alliance		Progressive
Home state	Massachusetts	Wisconsin	West Virginia
Running mate	Charles G. Dawes	Burton K. Wheeler	Charles W. Bryan
Electoral vote	13	0	0
Popular vote	733,250	424,649	105,514
Percentage	57.20%	33.13%	8.23%
County results
Coolidge
40–50%
50–60%
60–70%
80–90%
La Follette
40–50%
50–60%
President before election
Calvin Coolidge
Republican
Elected President
Calvin Coolidge
Republican

The 1924 United States presidential election in California took place on November 4, 1924, as part of the 1924 United States presidential election. State voters chose 13 electors, or representatives to the Electoral College, who voted for president and vice president.

Since the "Panic of 1893" and large-scale voter registration, California had become a one-party state dominated by the Republican Party. The Democratic Party was largely moribund as a result of its association with the Populist revolt, the rural formerly slave South, and the polyglot metropolis – which held no appeal in an old-stock Western state with very few Southern and Eastern European immigrants. Rigid registration laws and, before 1914, poll taxes, largely disfranchised what immigrants (who had leaned Democratic during the Third Party System) did when entering the state.

Nonetheless, the appeal of Progressivism and tendency towards nonpartisan politics allowed Woodrow Wilson to nearly carry the state in 1912 and do so in 1916 despite substantial Socialist votes in both elections; however, James M. Cox lost most of this support by 1920 as a result of a powerful reaction in the West against the social upheaval Wilson had caused.

Following the Cox debacle, the Democratic Party disintegrated even further. In that same 1920 election they failed to re-elect U.S. Senator James D. Phelan, and after the 1922 election they claimed only five seats in the 80-member California State Assembly, the lower house of the state Legislature, and just two seats out of 40 in the upper house, the California State Senate. Phelan's efforts to have William Gibbs McAdoo chosen as the Democratic presidential nominee in 1924 were defeated, and further ruined the party's organization and furthered cleavages between the "dry" and "wet" sections of the party.

California's large "Progressive" electorate had been divided by issues such as the League of Nations and Prohibition, and was weakened by the election of economy-minded Friend W. Richardson as Governor in 1922. When Wisconsin Senator Robert M. La Follette announced he would run a third-party presidential campaign in 1924, there remained division, but San Francisco Progressive Rudolph Spreckels supported him on the "Socialist" line against indifference from Hiram Johnson (who had attempted to unseat Coolidge in the GOP primaries) and state senators Herbert C. Jones and Joseph M. Inman.

Democratic nominee John W. Davis of West Virginia and Coolidge both spent most of their campaign attacking La Follette as a political extremist. At the beginning of the campaign, Davis had substantial hope of recovering support lost in 1920. However, Davis' opposition to women's suffrage, and belief in strictly limited government with no expansion in nonmilitary fields had almost no appeal in California. Although in September Davis underwent an extensive tour of the region and of the Great Plains, and campaigned to eliminate the income tax burden of the poorer classes, he received a mere 8.23 percent of the vote in California – the worst for any major party nominee in the state's history and his fourth-worst state nationwide.

Reduced to a battle between Coolidge and La Follette, the incumbent president campaigned upon present prosperity in addition to his opponent's perceived extremism. Despite perception the state may be doubtful, Coolidge won a plurality of over 24 percentage points, aided by a campaign based upon vilification. La Follette did nonetheless match Coolidge outside conservative, heavily populated Southern California, and he carried most urban working-class districts in Northern California, as well as most of the Sierra logging counties that were to become Democratic strongholds between FDR and Jimmy Carter. La Follette's vote was later to revive the moribund Democratic Party when it turned largely to Al Smith (whom La Follette's family was to endorse when he died) in the following election.

== Results ==
General Election Results
Party	Pledged to	Elector	Votes
Republican Party	Calvin Coolidge	Louis M. Cole	733,250
Republican Party	Calvin Coolidge	Mrs. John M. Eshleman	733,196
Republican Party	Calvin Coolidge	John L. McNab	732,893
Republican Party	Calvin Coolidge	George C. Pardee	732,788
Republican Party	Calvin Coolidge	James M. Cremin	732,749
Republican Party	Calvin Coolidge	Jesse W. Lilienthal Jr.	732,697
Republican Party	Calvin Coolidge	C. R. Clinch	732,681
Republican Party	Calvin Coolidge	George W. Peltier	732,681
Republican Party	Calvin Coolidge	Madison T. Owens	732,649
Republican Party	Calvin Coolidge	Charles A. Wayland	732,626
Republican Party	Calvin Coolidge	Thomas W. McManus	732,619
Republican Party	Calvin Coolidge	Martin C. Neuner	732,552
Republican Party	Calvin Coolidge	Louise Harvey Clark	732,512
Socialist Party	Robert M. La Follette Sr.	Albert G. Rogers	424,649
Socialist Party	Robert M. La Follette Sr.	Agnes H. Downing	424,170
Socialist Party	Robert M. La Follette Sr.	W. E. Murphy	424,170
Socialist Party	Robert M. La Follette Sr.	Lola Coggins	424,102
Socialist Party	Robert M. La Follette Sr.	Walter S. Fogg	424,098
Socialist Party	Robert M. La Follette Sr.	Frank C. Page	424,095
Socialist Party	Robert M. La Follette Sr.	Hugo Ernst	424,086
Socialist Party	Robert M. La Follette Sr.	John C. Packard	424,068
Socialist Party	Robert M. La Follette Sr.	William M. Falls	424,057
Socialist Party	Robert M. La Follette Sr.	Alice S. Eddy	424,017
Socialist Party	Robert M. La Follette Sr.	Samuel Weisenberg	424,009
Socialist Party	Robert M. La Follette Sr.	E. Backus	423,996
Socialist Party	Robert M. La Follette Sr.	Walter E. Walker	423,968
Democratic Party	John W. Davis	James D. Phelan	105,514
Democratic Party	John W. Davis	Mattison B. Jones	105,504
Democratic Party	John W. Davis	Annette A. Adams	105,485
Democratic Party	John W. Davis	R. F. Del Valle	105,468
Democratic Party	John W. Davis	Thomas M. Storke	105,396
Democratic Party	John W. Davis	Mary E. Foy	105,393
Democratic Party	John W. Davis	William M. Conley	105,392
Democratic Party	John W. Davis	William Kettner	105,392
Democratic Party	John W. Davis	Katherine Braddock	105,323
Democratic Party	John W. Davis	E. S. Heller	105,320
Democratic Party	John W. Davis	James F. Peck	105,299
Democratic Party	John W. Davis	C. L. Culbert	105,270
Democratic Party	John W. Davis	Edna L. Knight	105,229
Prohibition Party	Herman P. Faris	J. S. Edwards	18,436
Prohibition Party	Herman P. Faris	H. A. Johnson	18,365
Prohibition Party	Herman P. Faris	S. P. Meads	18,259
Prohibition Party	Herman P. Faris	Helen M. Brown	18,250
Prohibition Party	Herman P. Faris	John H. Kendall	18,243
Prohibition Party	Herman P. Faris	J. C. Bell	18,216
Prohibition Party	Herman P. Faris	J. L. Rollings	18,212
Prohibition Party	Herman P. Faris	H. Clay Needham	18,205
Prohibition Party	Herman P. Faris	Dana G. Boleyn	18,188
Prohibition Party	Herman P. Faris	Frederick Head	18,173
Prohibition Party	Herman P. Faris	Wiley J. Phillips	18,172
Prohibition Party	Herman P. Faris	Lucius C. Dale	18,155
Prohibition Party	Herman P. Faris	O. U. Hull	18,141
Write-in		Scattering	122
Votes cast (Note: Based on totals for highest elector on each ticket)			1,281,900

=== Results by county ===
County	Calvin Coolidge Republican		Robert M. La Follette Socialist		John W. Davis Democratic		Herman Faris Prohibition		Scattering Write-in		Margin		Total votes cast (Note: Based on the highest elector on each ticket)
County	#	%	#	%	#	%	#	%	#	%	#	%	Total votes cast
Alameda	81,454	61.42%	41,434	31.24%	8,020	6.05%	1,592	1.20%	111	0.08%	40,020	30.18%	132,601
Alpine	52	88.14%	1	1.69%	5	8.47%	1	1.69%	0	0.00%	47 (Note: Margin over Davis)	79.67%	59
Amador	719	38.93%	787	42.61%	316	17.11%	25	1.35%	0	0.00%	-68	-3.68%	1,847
Butte	4,382	42.24%	4,582	44.17%	1,299	12.52%	111	1.07%	0	0.00%	-200	-1.93%	10,374
Calaveras	872	39.46%	975	44.12%	333	15.07%	30	1.36%	0	0.00%	-103	-4.66%	2,210
Colusa	1,127	43.82%	889	34.56%	495	19.25%	61	2.37%	0	0.00%	238	9.26%	2,572
Contra Costa	9,061	54.69%	6,231	37.61%	1,114	6.72%	163	0.98%	0	0.00%	2,830	17.08%	16,569
Del Norte	530	52.63%	322	31.98%	122	12.12%	33	3.28%	0	0.00%	208	20.65%	1,007
El Dorado	852	28.49%	1,749	58.48%	361	12.07%	29	0.97%	0	0.00%	-897	-29.99%	2,991
Fresno	15,635	44.00%	14,836	41.75%	4,610	12.97%	453	1.27%	0	0.00%	799	2.25%	35,534
Glenn	1,444	44.91%	1,330	41.37%	367	11.42%	74	2.30%	0	0.00%	114	3.54%	3,215
Humboldt	6,767	56.83%	4,148	34.83%	845	7.10%	148	1.24%	0	0.00%	2,619	22.00%	11,908
Imperial	3,455	50.24%	2,549	37.07%	759	11.04%	114	1.66%	0	0.00%	906	13.17%	6,877
Inyo	950	47.45%	779	38.91%	256	12.79%	17	0.85%	0	0.00%	171	8.54%	2,002
Kern	8,646	46.08%	6,754	36.00%	3,159	16.84%	203	1.08%	0	0.00%	1,892	10.08%	18,762
Kings	2,812	50.00%	1,611	28.65%	1,109	19.72%	92	1.64%	0	0.00%	1,201	21.35%	5,624
Lake	795	44.92%	658	37.18%	261	14.75%	56	3.16%	0	0.00%	137	7.74%	1,770
Lassen	1,072	40.74%	1,164	44.24%	356	13.53%	39	1.48%	0	0.00%	-92	-3.50%	2,631
Los Angeles	299,675	65.51%	117,249	25.63%	33,554	7.33%	6,997	1.53%	5	0.00%	182,426	39.88%	457,480
Madera	1,518	42.64%	1,514	42.53%	450	12.64%	78	2.19%	0	0.00%	4	0.11%	3,560
Marin	5,780	53.51%	4,230	39.16%	656	6.07%	136	1.26%	0	0.00%	1,550	14.35%	10,802
Mariposa	344	40.23%	332	38.83%	168	19.65%	11	1.29%	0	0.00%	12	1.40%	855
Mendocino	3,465	56.48%	1,850	30.15%	739	12.05%	81	1.32%	0	0.00%	1,615	26.33%	6,135
Merced	3,573	52.95%	2,301	34.10%	710	10.52%	164	2.43%	0	0.00%	1,272	18.85%	6,748
Modoc	731	43.72%	547	32.72%	374	22.37%	20	1.20%	0	0.00%	184	11.00%	1,672
Mono	166	53.55%	98	31.61%	45	14.52%	1	0.32%	0	0.00%	68	21.94%	310
Monterey	4,744	61.06%	2,035	26.19%	886	11.40%	104	1.34%	0	0.00%	2,709	34.87%	7,769
Napa	3,605	54.83%	2,237	34.02%	670	10.19%	63	0.96%	0	0.00%	1,368	20.81%	6,575
Nevada	1,513	42.24%	1,682	46.96%	307	8.57%	80	2.23%	0	0.00%	-169	-4.72%	3,582
Orange	19,913	67.35%	6,480	21.92%	2,565	8.68%	609	2.06%	0	0.00%	13,433	45.43%	29,567
Placer	2,192	36.63%	3,290	54.98%	390	6.52%	112	1.87%	0	0.00%	-1,098	-18.35%	5,984
Plumas	564	32.87%	956	55.71%	182	10.61%	14	0.82%	0	0.00%	-392	-22.84%	1,716
Riverside	9,619	62.01%	4,204	27.10%	1,318	8.50%	371	2.39%	0	0.00%	5,415	34.91%	15,512
Sacramento	13,400	41.08%	16,570	50.80%	2,285	7.01%	359	1.10%	2	0.00%	-3,170	-9.72%	32,616
San Benito	1,443	53.56%	857	31.81%	361	13.40%	33	1.22%	0	0.00%	586	21.75%	2,694
San Bernardino	15,974	56.91%	8,720	31.07%	2,634	9.38%	741	2.64%	0	0.00%	7,254	25.84%	28,069
San Diego	22,726	48.99%	20,200	43.54%	2,944	6.35%	523	1.13%	0	0.00%	2,526	5.45%	46,393
San Francisco	73,494	47.74%	68,864	44.73%	9,811	6.37%	1,781	1.16%	0	0.00%	4,630	3.01%	153,950
San Joaquin	11,056	48.91%	8,885	39.30%	2,397	10.60%	268	1.19%	0	0.00%	2,171	9.61%	22,606
San Luis Obispo	3,804	49.01%	3,061	39.44%	731	9.42%	165	2.13%	0	0.00%	743	9.57%	7,761
San Mateo	8,126	55.28%	5,694	38.73%	771	5.24%	109	0.74%	0	0.00%	2,432	16.55%	14,700
Santa Barbara	8,615	64.69%	3,292	24.72%	1,242	9.33%	169	1.27%	0	0.00%	5,323	39.97%	13,318
Santa Clara	20,056	58.02%	11,474	33.19%	2,560	7.41%	476	1.38%	0	0.00%	8,582	24.83%	34,566
Santa Cruz	5,402	60.85%	2,557	28.80%	801	9.02%	118	1.33%	0	0.00%	2,845	32.05%	8,878
Shasta	1,951	41.95%	2,049	44.06%	598	12.86%	53	1.14%	0	0.00%	-98	-2.11%	4,651
Sierra	276	38.93%	350	49.37%	73	10.30%	10	1.41%	0	0.00%	-74	-10.44%	709
Siskiyou	2,437	40.60%	2,844	47.38%	584	9.73%	138	2.30%	0	0.00%	-407	-6.78%	6,003
Solano	4,782	48.01%	4,123	41.40%	957	9.61%	100	1.00%	0	0.00%	659	6.61%	9,962
Sonoma	9,535	55.99%	5,469	32.11%	1,767	10.38%	259	1.52%	1	0.00%	4,066	23.88%	17,031
Stanislaus	7,569	56.83%	4,125	30.97%	1,274	9.57%	350	2.63%	0	0.00%	3,444	25.86%	13,318
Sutter	1,617	49.92%	1,219	37.64%	367	11.33%	36	1.11%	0	0.00%	398	12.28%	3,239
Tehama	1,943	45.96%	1,667	39.43%	486	11.49%	132	3.12%	0	0.00%	276	6.53%	4,228
Trinity	336	36.52%	414	45.00%	154	16.74%	16	1.74%	0	0.00%	-78	-8.48%	920
Tulare	9,484	50.78%	5,504	29.47%	3,425	18.34%	262	1.40%	3	0.00%	3,980	21.31%	18,678
Tuolumne	1,287	43.03%	1,327	44.37%	357	11.94%	20	0.67%	0	0.00%	-40	-1.34%	2,991
Ventura	5,705	65.16%	2,029	23.18%	911	10.41%	110	1.26%	0	0.00%	3,676	41.98%	8,755
Yolo	2,470	45.35%	2,097	38.50%	797	14.63%	83	1.52%	0	0.00%	373	6.85%	5,447
Yuba	1,735	47.40%	1,454	39.73%	426	11.64%	45	1.23%	0	0.00%	281	7.67%	3,660
Total	733,250	57.20%	424,649	33.12%	105,514	8.23%	18,436	1.44%	122	0.00%	308,601	24.08%	1,281,971

==== Counties that flipped from Republican to Socialist ====
- Amador
- Butte
- Calaveras
- El Dorado
- Lassen
- Nevada
- Placer
- Plumas
- Sacramento
- Shasta
- Sierra
- Siskiyou
- Trinity
- Tuolumne

== See also ==
- United States presidential elections in California
