= 1916 Wisconsin lieutenant gubernatorial election =

- November 7, 1916
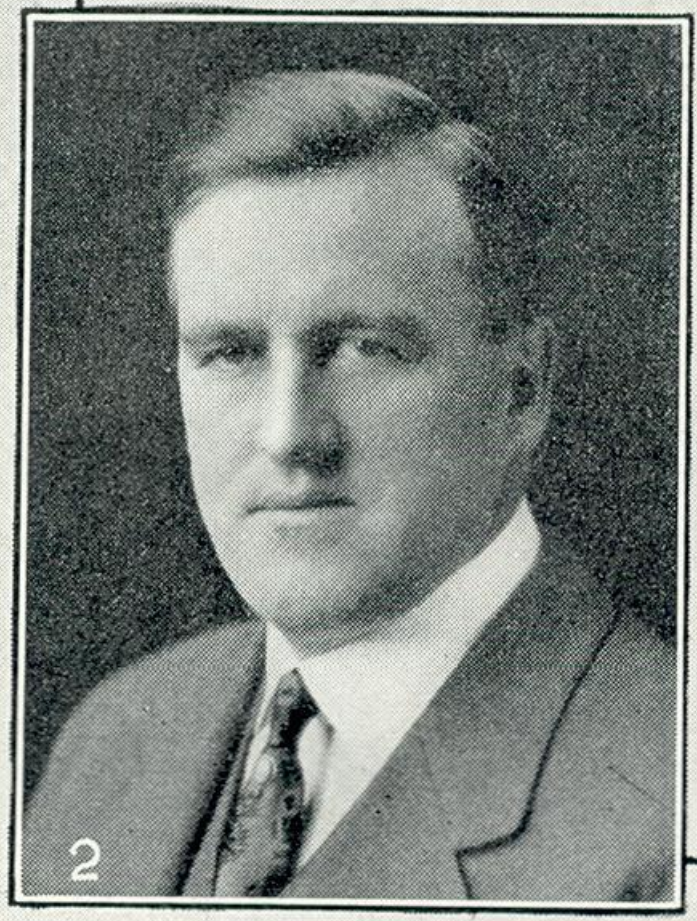

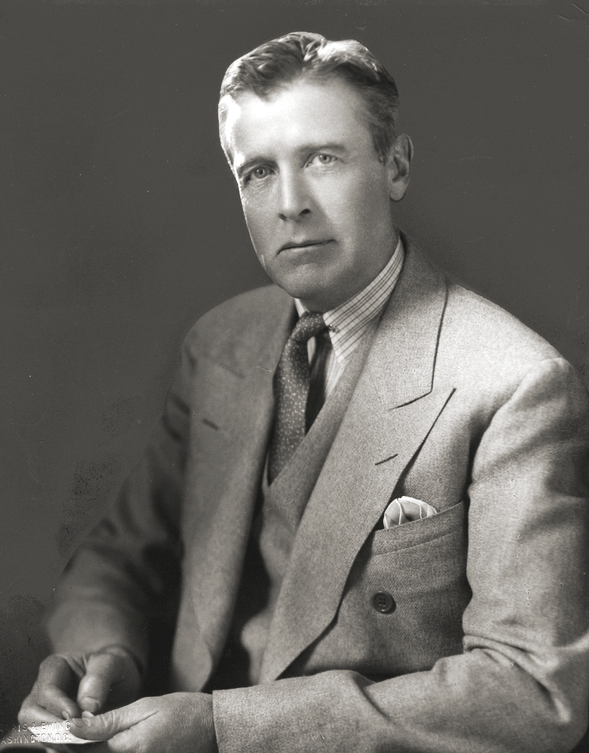

Nominee	Edward Dithmar	John Cudahy	Ellis B. Harris
Party	Republican	Democratic	Social-Democratic
Popular vote	230,293	145,383	31,411
Percentage	55.44%	35.00%	7.56%
Lieutenant Governor before election
Edward Dithmar
Republican
Elected Lieutenant Governor
Edward Dithmar
Republican

The 1916 Wisconsin lieutenant gubernatorial election was held on November 7, 1916, in order to elect the lieutenant governor of Wisconsin. Incumbent Republican lieutenant governor Edward Dithmar defeated Democratic nominee John Cudahy, Social-Democratic nominee Ellis B. Harris and Prohibition nominee Charles H. Mott.

== Republican primary ==
The Republican primary election was held on September 5, 1916. Incumbent lieutenant governor Edward Dithmar received a majority of the votes (54.42%) against Wisconsin National Guard Colonel and candidate for lieutenant governor in the previous election Marshall Cousins, and was thus elected as the nominee for the general election.

=== Results ===
1916 Republican lieutenant gubernatorial primary
Party	Candidate	Votes	%
Republican	Edward Dithmar (incumbent)	82,712	54.42%
Republican	Marshall Cousins	69,265	45.58%
Total votes		151,977	100.00%

== General election ==
On election day, November 7, 1916, incumbent Republican lieutenant governor Edward Dithmar won re-election by a margin of 84,910 votes against his foremost opponent Democratic nominee John Cudahy, thereby retaining Republican control over the office of lieutenant governor. Dithmar was sworn in for his second term on January 1, 1917.

=== Results ===
Wisconsin lieutenant gubernatorial election, 1916
Party	Candidate	Votes	%
Republican	Edward Dithmar (incumbent)	230,293	55.44
Democratic	John Cudahy	145,383	35.00
Social-Democratic	Ellis B. Harris	31,411	7.56
Prohibition	Charles H. Mott	8,279	1.99
	Scattering	30	0.01
Total votes		415,396	100.00
Republican hold			
