= Elections in Iceland =

Iceland elects on a national level a mostly ceremonial head of state—the president—and a legislature. The president is elected for a four-year term by the people. The parliament (Alþingi) has 63 members, elected for a four-year term by proportional representation using the D'Hondt method with a closed list. Iceland has a multi-party system, with numerous parties in which no one party typically has a chance of gaining power alone which typically results in a hung parliament, so parties must work with each other to form coalition governments.

The last election was on 1 June 2024.

== Voting ==
=== Eligibility ===
According to Registers Iceland, All Icelandic nationals who have lived abroad for less than eight years are automatically registered to vote as long as they are 18 and have lived in Iceland at some point. Icelandic citizens who lived abroad for more than eight years must register to vote, as long as they are a citizen, at least eighteen years old, and have had legal domicile in Iceland.

Foreign nationals are not allowed to vote in presidential elections, parliamentary elections, or national referendums. Danish nationals who lived in Iceland on 6 March 1946 or any point ten years before that are eligible to vote.

Foreign nationals from Sweden, Denmark, Norway, and Finland can vote in municipal elections if they have registered their domicile in Iceland before election day. Foreign nationals from other countries have to live in Iceland for three years to be eligible to vote in these elections.

=== Voting procedures ===
By law, municipal and presidential elections take place on a Saturday. Parliamentary elections have also traditionally taken place on Saturdays since 1983, although a particular weekday is not mandated by law. Voters are required to present a government issued photo ID such as a passport or a driving license. All voting is done by paper ballots. The voter gets a single ballot containing ordered electoral lists for every party.

== Schedule ==
Position	2023	2024	2025	2026	2027
President (1 position)	None	Election	None	None	None
Parliament (63 seats)	None	Election	None	None	None
Municipalities (64 councils)	None	None	None	Election	None

== Latest elections ==
=== Overall ===
Party	Seats	+/–
Independence Party	113	–5
Progressive Party	69	+23
Social Democratic Alliance	26	–3
Left-Green Movement	9	+1
Centre Party	6	–3
Reform Party	5	–1
Pirate Party	4	+1
People's Party	2	+1
Icelandic Socialist Party	2	+1
Other party lists	165	–34
Independents	69	–13
Total	470	–32

=== 2021 parliamentary elections ===
Compared to polling, the Progressive Party and the People's Party performed better than expectations, while the Social Democratic Alliance, Viðreisn, the Pirate Party, and the new Icelandic Socialist Party performed slightly worse. The Centre Party saw its vote percentage and seat count reduced by half compared to the prior elections, while the Progressive Party saw a vote percentage increase of over 6% and a seat increase of 5. The governing grand coalition of the Independence Party, the Left-Green Movement, and the Progressive Party were expected to negotiate to continue their cooperation.

On 9 October, Birgir Þórarinsson, who was originally elected to represent the Centre Party, announced that he was defecting to the Independence Party, making him the 17th member of the Althing for the Independence Party and leaving the Centre Party with just two members.

Party	Votes	%	Seats	+/–
Independence Party	48,708	24.39	16	0
Progressive Party	34,501	17.27	13	+5
Left-Green Movement	25,114	12.57	8	–3
Social Democratic Alliance	19,825	9.93	6	–1
People's Party	17,672	8.85	6	+2
Pirate Party	17,233	8.63	6	0
Viðreisn	16,628	8.33	5	+1
Centre Party	10,879	5.45	3	–4
Icelandic Socialist Party	8,181	4.10	0	New
Liberal Democratic Party	845	0.42	0	New
Responsible Future	144	0.07	0	New
Total	199,730	100.00	63	0
Valid votes	199,730	97.92		
Invalid/blank votes	4,249	2.08		
Total votes	203,979	100.00		
Registered voters/turnout	254,681	80.09		
Source: Statistics Iceland

=== By constituency ===
Constituency	D	B	V	S	F	P	C	M
Reykjavík North	20.9	12.3	15.9	12.6	7.7	12.8	7.7	3.5
Reykjavík South	22.8	11.5	14.7	13.3	8.9	10.9	8.6	4.1
Southwest	30.2	14.5	12.1	8.1	7.6	8.3	11.4	4.5
Northwest	22.5	25.8	11.5	6.9	8.8	6.3	6.2	7.4
Northeast	18.5	25.6	12.9	10.5	8.6	5.3	5.4	8.9
South	24.6	23.9	7.4	7.6	12.9	5.6	6.2	7.4

Constituency	D	B	V	S	F	P	C	M	Total
Reykjavík North	2	1	2	2	1	2	1	0	11
Reykjavík South	3	1	2	1	1	2	1	0	11
Southwest	4	2	1	1	1	2	2	0	13
Northwest	2	3	1	0	1	0	0	1	8
Northeast	2	3	2	1	1	0	0	1	10
South	3	3	0	1	1	0	1	1	10

=== Recounts ===
It was initially reported that 33 women and 30 men were elected, making Iceland the first European nation to have a female-majority parliament. Among them was Lenya Rún Taha Karim of the Pirate Party, who at 21 would become the youngest MP in Iceland's history. Following a recount in the Northwest Constituency, the representation became a majority of men. The Left-Green Movement and the Pirate Party both requested recounts in the South Constituency.

=== 2020 presidential election ===
Candidate	Party	Votes	%
Guðni Th. Jóhannesson	Independent	150,913	92.18
Guðmundur Franklín Jónsson	Independent	12,797	7.82
Invalid/blank votes		5,111	–
Total		168,821	100
Registered voters/turnout		252,267	66.92
Source: RÚV,

== See also ==
- List of elections in Iceland
