= 1908 Icelandic parliamentary election =

Parliamentary elections were held in Iceland on 10 September 1908, alongside a referendum on prohibition.

== Background ==
The Althing was dissolved by King Frederik VIII in the early spring in order to elect a new parliament that would vote on a draft status law that would define the position of Iceland in the Danish realm. The election campaign was one of the acrimonious in Icelandic political history due to the controversial nature of the draft. The opposition was led by Skúli Thoroddsen, a member of the Independence Party.

== Electoral system ==
The 36 members of the Althing were elected from a mix of single-member and two-member constituencies. The elections were the first to take place since changes to the electoral system in 1904; they were the first to be held using the secret ballot, and also saw the three-round majoritarian system replaced by plurality voting as multiple rounds of voting on the same day were no longer possible. The tax qualification for voting was also reduced, increasing the proportion of people able to vote to around 14% of the population, up from 7,786 in 1903 to 11,726.

== Results ==
Candidates opposed to the draft law won a landslide majority, whilst voter turnout was 72.4%, nearly 20% more than the 1903 elections. As a result, the law was voted down in 1909, resulting in the resignation of Minister for Iceland Hannes Hafstein.
