= 1914 Connecticut lieutenant gubernatorial election =

- November 3, 1914
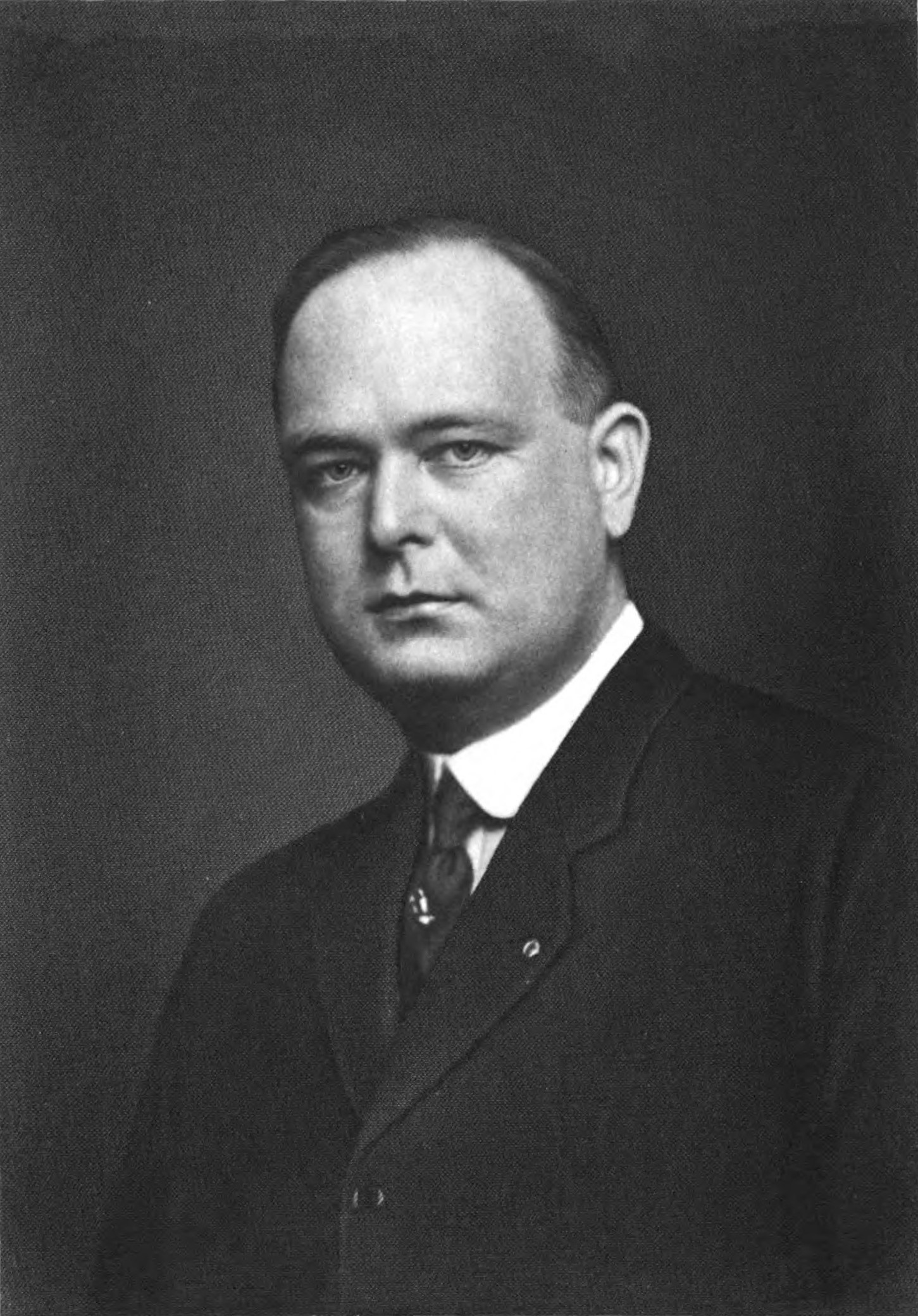

Nominee	Clifford B. Wilson	George M. Landers
Party	Republican	Democratic
Popular vote	89,876	74,039
Percentage	54.80%	45.20%
Lieutenant Governor before election
Lyman T. Tingier
Democratic
Elected Lieutenant Governor
Clifford B. Wilson
Republican

The 1914 Connecticut lieutenant gubernatorial election was held on November 3, 1914, to elect the lieutenant governor of Connecticut. Republican nominee and incumbent mayor of Bridgeport Clifford B. Wilson won the election against Democratic nominee George M. Landers.

== General election ==
On election day, November 3, 1914, Republican nominee Clifford B. Wilson won the election with 54.80% of the vote, thereby gaining Republican control over the office of lieutenant governor. Wilson was sworn in as the 76th lieutenant governor of Connecticut on January 6, 1915.

=== Results ===
Connecticut lieutenant gubernatorial election, 1914
Party	Candidate	Votes	%
Republican	Clifford B. Wilson	89,876	54.80
Democratic	George M. Landers	74,039	45.20
Total votes		163,915	100.00
Republican gain from Democratic			
