= 1916 Connecticut lieutenant gubernatorial election =

- November 7, 1916
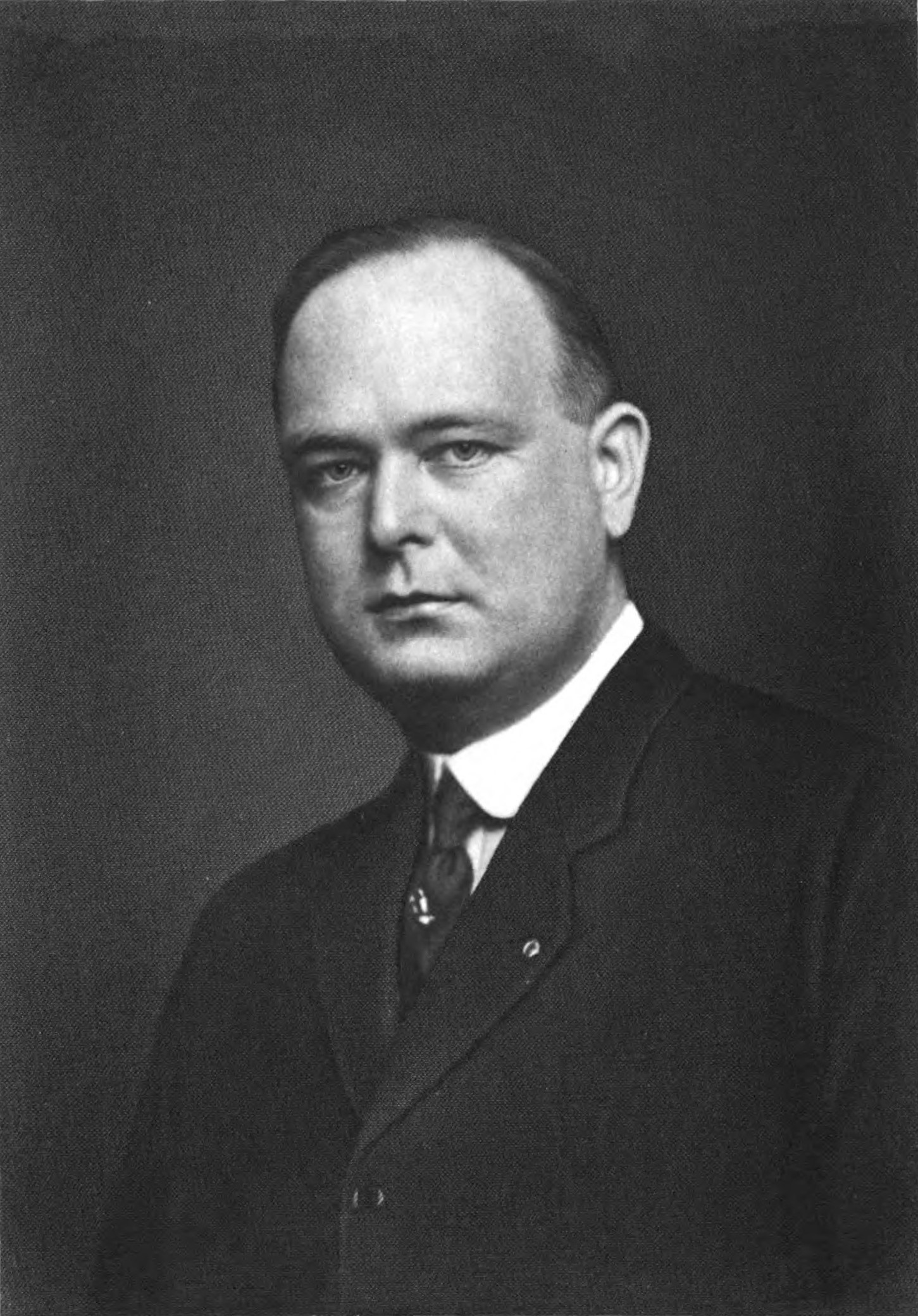

Nominee	Clifford B. Wilson	Francis P. Guilfoile
Party	Republican	Democratic
Popular vote	108,190	97,451
Percentage	52.60%	47.40%
Lieutenant Governor before election
Clifford B. Wilson
Republican
Elected Lieutenant Governor
Clifford B. Wilson
Republican

The 1916 Connecticut lieutenant gubernatorial election was held on November 7, 1916, to elect the lieutenant governor of Connecticut. Incumbent Republican lieutenant governor Clifford B. Wilson won re-election against Democratic nominee Francis P. Guilfoile.

== General election ==
On election day, November 7, 1916, incumbent Republican lieutenant governor Clifford B. Wilson won re-election with 52.60% of the vote, thereby retaining Republican control over the office of lieutenant governor. Wilson was sworn in for his second term on January 3, 1917.

=== Results ===
Connecticut lieutenant gubernatorial election, 1916
Party	Candidate	Votes	%
Republican	Clifford B. Wilson (incumbent)	108,190	52.60
Democratic	Francis P. Guilfoile	97,451	47.40
Total votes		205,641	100.00
Republican hold			
