= Auroracoin =

Cryptocurrency associated with Iceland

Unit
- Symbol: ᚠ

Demographics
- Date of introduction: 25 March 2014
- User(s): Iceland (de-facto)

Auroracoin (Abbreviation: AUR; sign: ᚠ) is a peer-to-peer cryptocurrency launched in February 2014 as an Icelandic alternative to bitcoin and the Icelandic króna. The unknown creator or creators use the pseudonym Baldur Friggjar Óðinsson (or Odinsson). They stated that they planned to distribute half of auroracoins that would ever be created to all 330,000 people listed in Iceland's national ID database beginning on March 25, 2014, free of charge, coming out to ᚠ31.8 per person.

Auroracoin was created as an alternative currency to address the government restrictions on Iceland's króna, in place since 2008, which severely restricts movement of the currency outside the country.

== History ==
Academics Richard Porter and Wade Rousse argue that 'in many ways, Iceland could be seen as an ideal place for a virtual currency' on account of the limited use of cash, extensive familiarity with electronic finance, and extensive interest in Bitcoin in Icelandic society, coupled with the long-term instability of the króna.

=== Airdrop ===
The developers used the Kennitala national identification system to give away 50% of the total issuance of Auroracoins to the population of Iceland, a process known as an airdrop, hoping to bootstrap a network effect and introduce cryptocurrency to a national audience.

== Controversy ==
As of 2015, the legal status of cryptocurrencies in Iceland was unclear, though the Auroracoin airdrop involved government approval of Odinsson's use of the national database of citizens, Íslykill. Some Icelandic politicians have taken a negative view of Auroracoin. During a parliamentary debate on March 14, 2014, MP Pétur Blöndal, vice-chair of the Parliament's Economic Affairs and Trade Committee (EATC), emphasized that potential tax evasion through the use of Auroracoin could impact Iceland's economy. He also said that the public should realize that Auroracoin "is not a recognized currency since no-one backs the medium".

MP Frosti Sigurjónsson, a member of the ruling Progressive Party and Chairman of the EATC, suggested in a blog post on his website that there is evidence that Auroracoin is an illegal financial "scam".
