= 1916 United States presidential election in California =

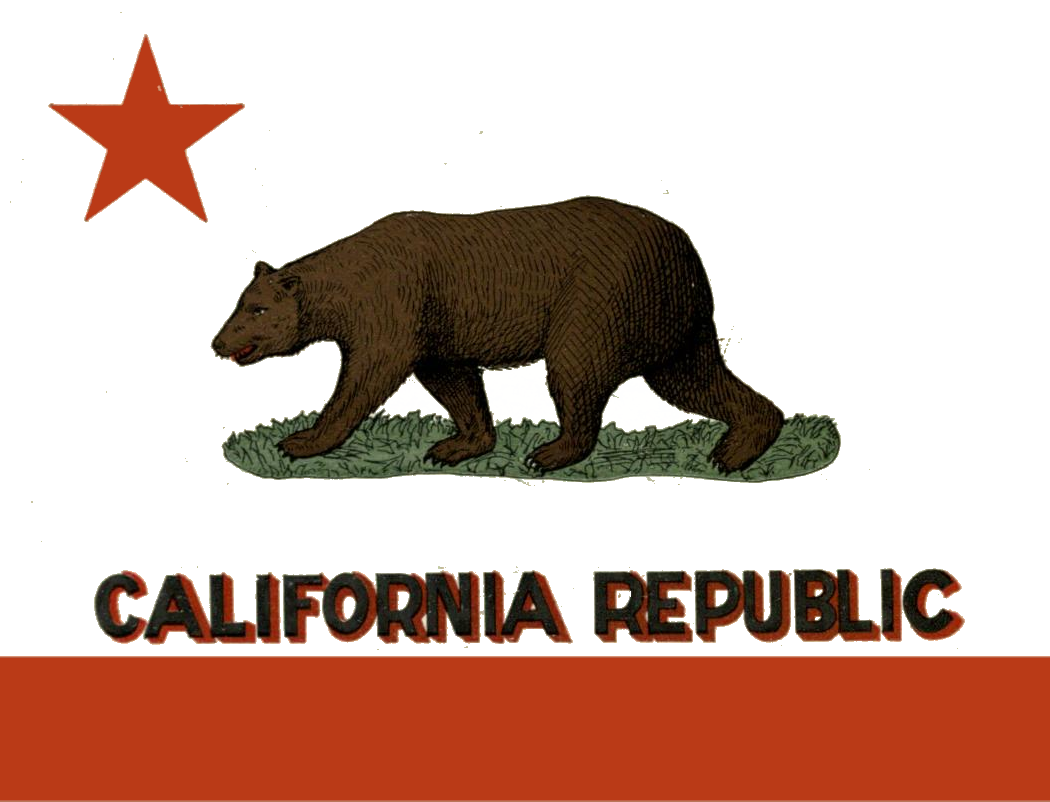
- November 7, 1916
- Turnout: 79.57% (of registered voters) ▲7.89 pp 57.91% (of eligible voters) ▲12.80 pp

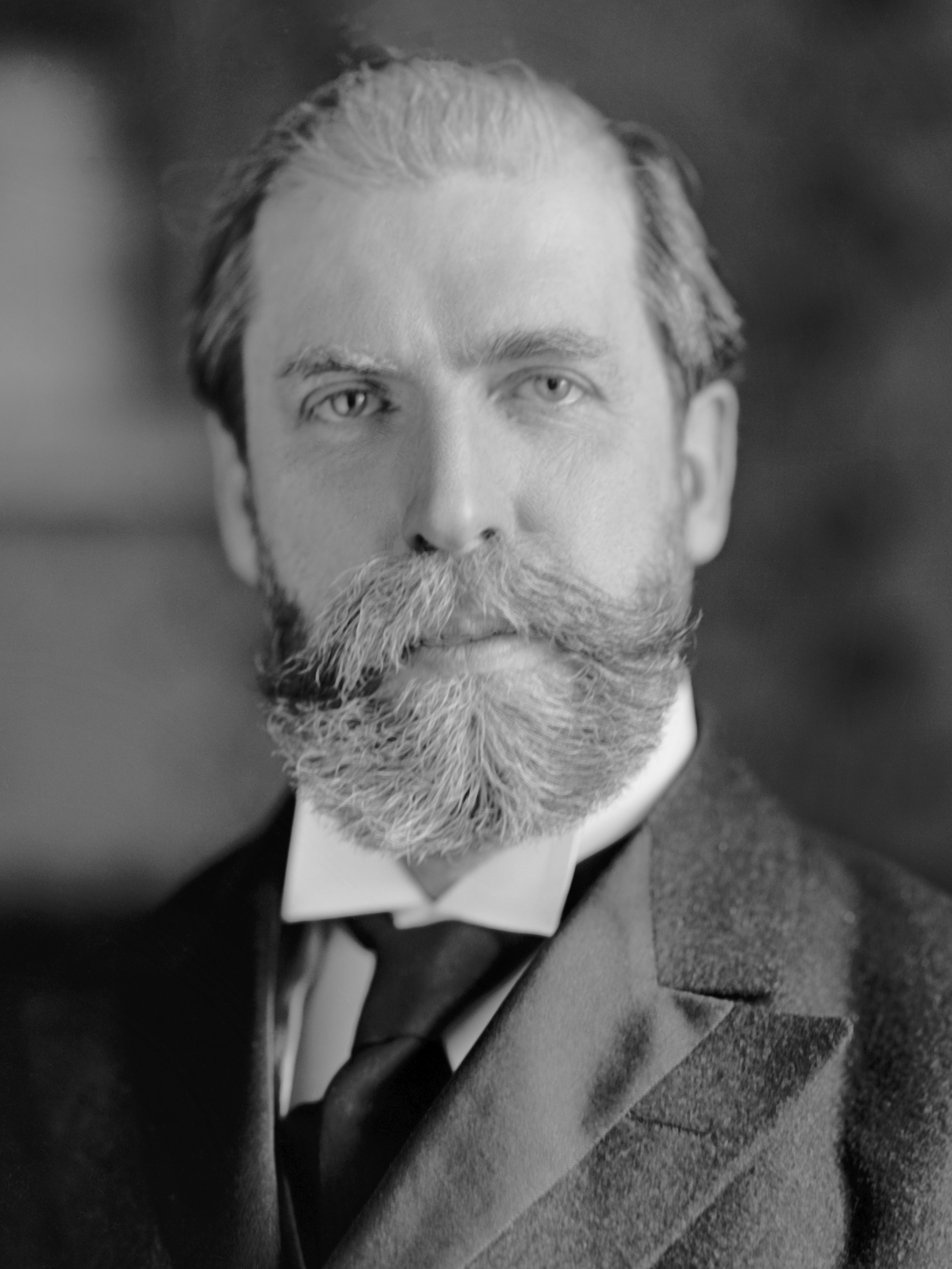
Nominee	Woodrow Wilson	Charles Evans Hughes
Party	Democratic	Republican
Home state	New Jersey	New York
Running mate	Thomas R. Marshall	Charles W. Fairbanks
Electoral vote	13	0
Popular vote	466,289	462,516
Percentage	46.65%	46.27%
County results
Wilson
40–50%
50–60%
60–70%
Hughes
40–50%
50–60%
70–80%
President before election
Woodrow Wilson
Democratic
Elected President
Woodrow Wilson
Democratic

The 1916 United States presidential election in California took place on November 7, 1916 as part of the 1916 United States presidential election. State voters chose 13 representatives, or electors, to the Electoral College, who voted for president and vice president.

California narrowly voted for the Democratic incumbent, Woodrow Wilson, over the Republican nominee, Associate Justice Charles Evans Hughes.

Although very close, this was not as close as the previous election or the critical 1892 election in California, and was only the third-closest state in a thrilling election behind New Hampshire and Minnesota. As of 2024, no subsequent presidential election in California has been decided by a smaller margin, although California was decided by less than one point in 1948 and 1960. This was the closest result where California's electoral votes were not split.

Following on from breaking half-a-dozen county droughts in 1912, Wilson became the first Democrat to carry Placer County, Plumas County, and Santa Barbara County, since Stephen A. Douglas in 1860, and the first to carry the counties of Contra Costa and Santa Cruz since James Buchanan in 1856. If Hughes had won California, he would have won the Electoral College despite losing the national popular vote by three points. This is the last election in which a Republican candidate carried Los Angeles County but failed to carry the state of California. Had Hughes carried the state, he would have been elected with 267 electoral votes to Wilson's 264.

== Results ==
General Election Results
Party	Pledged to	Elector	Votes
Democratic Party	Woodrow Wilson	Francis J. Heney	466,289
Democratic Party	Woodrow Wilson	Edward L. Doheny	465,936
Democratic Party	Woodrow Wilson	Jo V. Snyder	465,092
Democratic Party	Woodrow Wilson	Irving C. Ackerman	464,926
Democratic Party	Woodrow Wilson	L. F. Puter	464,824
Democratic Party	Woodrow Wilson	John F. Barry	464,808
Democratic Party	Woodrow Wilson	Oscar Hocks	464,731
Democratic Party	Woodrow Wilson	James F. Peck	464,680
Democratic Party	Woodrow Wilson	Lorin A. Handley	464,515
Democratic Party	Woodrow Wilson	R. F. Del Valle	464,477
Democratic Party	Woodrow Wilson	Virginia M. Spinks	464,233
Democratic Party	Woodrow Wilson	Mary Marshall Wiley	464,206
Democratic Party	Woodrow Wilson	Carrie L. Tyler	463,709
Republican Party	Charles Evans Hughes	J. F. Carlston	462,516
Republican Party	Charles Evans Hughes	John A. Britton	462,004
Republican Party	Charles Evans Hughes	T. S. Montgomery	461,828
Republican Party	Charles Evans Hughes	Willis H. Booth	461,826
Republican Party	Charles Evans Hughes	W. F. Chandler	461,610
Republican Party	Charles Evans Hughes	Albert E. Boynton	461,588
Republican Party	Charles Evans Hughes	J. C. Needham	461,505
Republican Party	Charles Evans Hughes	Joseph Scott	461,354
Republican Party	Charles Evans Hughes	Rudolph J. Taussig	461,301
Republican Party	Charles Evans Hughes	Louise Harvey Clarke	460,941
Republican Party	Charles Evans Hughes	Mary Roberts Coolidge	460,908
Republican Party	Charles Evans Hughes	A. J. Wallace	460,826
Republican Party	Charles Evans Hughes	J. P. Baumgartner	460,821
Socialist Party	Allan L. Benson	Scott Anderson	42,898
Socialist Party	Allan L. Benson	Joseph Bredsteen	42,562
Socialist Party	Allan L. Benson	M. P. Christensen	42,412
Socialist Party	Allan L. Benson	Mollie Bloom Flagg	42,394
Socialist Party	Allan L. Benson	W. Scott Lewis	42,354
Socialist Party	Allan L. Benson	Ethel Lynn	42,330
Socialist Party	Allan L. Benson	Arnold R. Holston	42,327
Socialist Party	Allan L. Benson	C. W. Kingsley	42,320
Socialist Party	Allan L. Benson	Noble A. Richardson	42,312
Socialist Party	Allan L. Benson	Harry M. McKee	42,273
Socialist Party	Allan L. Benson	Ben F. Wilson	42,263
Socialist Party	Allan L. Benson	George W. Woodbey	42,232
Socialist Party	Allan L. Benson	A. E. Briggs	42,178
Prohibition Party	J. Franklin Hanly	Annie E. K. Bidwell	27,713
Prohibition Party	J. Franklin Hanly	Horace A. Johnson	27,408
Prohibition Party	J. Franklin Hanly	Fred F. Wheeler	27,208
Prohibition Party	J. Franklin Hanly	Robert Rogers	27,156
Prohibition Party	J. Franklin Hanly	Elam Biggs	27,116
Prohibition Party	J. Franklin Hanly	Minnie Goldthwaite	27,082
Prohibition Party	J. Franklin Hanly	C. C. Selecman	27,067
Prohibition Party	J. Franklin Hanly	Wiley J. Phillips	27,050
Prohibition Party	J. Franklin Hanly	A. K. Nash	27,027
Prohibition Party	J. Franklin Hanly	Ada E. Ferris	27,017
Prohibition Party	J. Franklin Hanly	Walter O. Woolever	27,013
Prohibition Party	J. Franklin Hanly	Thomas K. Beard	26,980
Prohibition Party	J. Franklin Hanly	C. S. Corkhill	26,894
Write-in		Scattering	187
Votes cast (Note: Based on totals for highest elector on each ticket)			999,603

=== Results by county ===
County	Woodrow Wilson Democratic		Charles Evans Hughes Republican		Allan L. Benson Socialist		J. Franklin Hanly Prohibition		Scattering Write-in		Margin		Total votes cast (Note: Based on the highest elector on each ticket)
County	#	%	#	%	#	%	#	%	#	%	#	%	Total votes cast
Alameda	43,748	42.84%	51,417	50.34%	5,422	5.31%	1,544	1.51%	0	0.00%	-7,669	-7.51%	102,131
Alpine	23	27.71%	60	72.29%	0	0.00%	0	0.00%	0	0.00%	-37	-44.58%	83
Amador	1,766	56.28%	1,209	38.53%	125	3.98%	38	1.21%	0	0.00%	557	17.75%	3,138
Butte	4,888	50.55%	3,956	40.91%	436	4.51%	389	4.02%	0	0.00%	932	9.64%	9,669
Calaveras	1,524	53.06%	1,175	40.91%	135	4.70%	38	1.32%	0	0.00%	349	12.15%	2,872
Colusa	1,998	62.89%	1,011	31.82%	123	3.87%	45	1.42%	0	0.00%	987	31.07%	3,177
Contra Costa	6,092	46.82%	5,731	44.05%	886	6.81%	302	2.32%	0	0.00%	361	2.77%	13,011
Del Norte	471	41.35%	499	43.81%	144	12.64%	25	2.19%	0	0.00%	-28	-2.46%	1,139
El Dorado	1,755	57.67%	1,068	35.10%	187	6.15%	33	1.08%	0	0.00%	687	22.58%	3,043
Fresno	14,241	49.95%	11,707	41.07%	1,648	5.78%	912	3.20%	0	0.00%	2,534	8.89%	28,508
Glenn	1,797	53.87%	1,342	40.23%	101	3.03%	94	2.82%	2	0.06%	455	13.64%	3,336
Humboldt	4,103	36.27%	5,786	51.14%	1,063	9.40%	361	3.19%	0	0.00%	-1,683	-14.88%	11,313
Imperial	3,273	49.15%	2,694	40.46%	363	5.45%	329	4.94%	0	0.00%	579	8.69%	6,659
Inyo	966	47.92%	846	41.96%	152	7.54%	52	2.58%	0	0.00%	120	5.95%	2,016
Kern	9,566	59.86%	5,611	35.11%	553	3.46%	251	1.57%	0	0.00%	3,955	24.75%	15,981
Kings	2,905	51.86%	2,221	39.65%	256	4.57%	220	3.93%	0	0.00%	684	12.21%	5,602
Lake	1,164	52.13%	791	35.42%	182	8.15%	96	4.30%	0	0.00%	373	16.70%	2,233
Lassen	1,323	55.75%	877	36.96%	143	6.03%	30	1.26%	0	0.00%	446	18.79%	2,373
Los Angeles	114,070	42.58%	135,554	50.59%	8,076	3.01%	10,061	3.76%	160	0.06%	-21,484	-8.02%	267,921
Madera	1,880	54.01%	1,323	38.01%	183	5.26%	86	2.56%	6	0.17%	557	16.00%	3,481
Marin	3,789	43.82%	4,328	50.05%	424	4.90%	106	1.23%	0	0.00%	-539	-6.23%	8,647
Mariposa	802	58.24%	451	32.75%	95	6.90%	29	2.11%	0	0.00%	351	25.49%	1,377
Mendocino	3,371	45.14%	3,494	46.79%	453	6.07%	150	2.01%	0	0.00%	-123	-1.65%	7,468
Merced	2,637	50.36%	2,132	40.72%	285	5.44%	182	3.48%	0	0.00%	505	9.64%	5,236
Modoc	1,222	58.25%	768	36.61%	79	3.77%	29	1.38%	0	0.00%	454	21.64%	2,098
Mono	158	48.47%	137	42.02%	26	7.98%	5	1.53%	0	0.00%	21	6.44%	326
Monterey	3,878	48.28%	3,599	44.81%	364	4.53%	191	2.38%	0	0.00%	279	3.47%	8,032
Napa	3,088	41.39%	3,914	52.46%	304	4.07%	155	2.08%	0	0.00%	-826	-11.07%	7,461
Nevada	2,548	56.58%	1,586	35.22%	279	6.20%	90	2.00%	0	0.00%	962	21.36%	4,503
Orange	6,474	34.54%	10,609	56.59%	643	3.43%	1,020	5.44%	0	0.00%	-4,135	-22.06%	18,746
Placer	3,375	58.28%	1,954	33.74%	314	5.42%	148	2.56%	0	0.00%	1,421	24.54%	5,791
Plumas	1,025	56.50%	663	36.55%	102	5.62%	24	1.32%	0	0.00%	362	19.96%	1,814
Riverside	4,561	33.44%	7,452	54.64%	790	5.79%	836	6.13%	0	0.00%	-2,891	-21.20%	13,639
Sacramento	14,538	54.63%	10,696	40.19%	833	3.13%	546	2.05%	0	0.00%	3,842	14.44%	26,613
San Benito	1,688	51.80%	1,440	44.19%	91	2.79%	40	1.23%	0	0.00%	248	7.61%	3,259
San Bernardino	9,398	39.92%	11,932	50.68%	805	3.42%	1,410	5.99%	0	0.00%	-2,534	-10.76%	23,545
San Diego	16,815	46.02%	16,978	46.47%	1,612	4.41%	1,132	3.10%	0	0.00%	-163	-0.45%	36,537
San Francisco	78,225	52.45%	63,093	42.30%	6,423	4.31%	1,404	0.94%	7	0.00%	15,132	10.15%	149,152
San Joaquin	11,454	55.44%	7,861	38.05%	789	3.82%	557	2.70%	0	0.00%	3,593	17.39%	20,661
San Luis Obispo	3,539	49.85%	2,854	40.20%	547	7.71%	159	2.24%	0	0.00%	685	9.65%	7,099
San Mateo	4,485	43.08%	5,207	50.01%	540	5.19%	179	1.72%	0	0.00%	-722	-6.93%	10,411
Santa Barbara	5,198	49.65%	4,453	42.54%	470	4.49%	347	3.31%	1	0.01%	745	7.12%	10,469
Santa Clara	14,185	43.40%	16,592	50.77%	1,006	3.08%	887	2.71%	11	0.03%	-2,407	-7.37%	32,681
Santa Cruz	4,511	47.76%	4,228	44.76%	383	4.05%	324	3.43%	0	0.00%	283	3.00%	9,446
Shasta	2,828	52.39%	2,008	37.20%	449	8.32%	113	2.09%	0	0.00%	820	15.19%	5,398
Sierra	594	58.35%	360	35.36%	55	5.40%	9	0.88%	0	0.00%	234	22.99%	1,018
Siskiyou	3,447	57.15%	2,059	34.13%	417	6.91%	109	1.81%	0	0.00%	1,388	23.01%	6,032
Solano	5,678	58.37%	3,536	36.35%	322	3.31%	192	1.97%	0	0.00%	2,142	22.02%	9,728
Sonoma	8,377	43.35%	9,733	50.37%	921	4.77%	293	1.52%	0	0.00%	-1,356	-7.02%	19,324
Stanislaus	5,490	46.98%	4,401	37.66%	729	6.24%	1,067	9.13%	0	0.00%	1,089	9.32%	11,687
Sutter	1,543	53.52%	1,211	42.00%	80	2.77%	49	1.70%	0	0.00%	332	11.52%	2,883
Tehama	2,534	52.92%	1,739	36.32%	334	6.98%	181	3.78%	0	0.00%	795	16.60%	4,788
Trinity	661	54.81%	424	35.16%	104	8.62%	17	1.41%	0	0.00%	237	19.65%	1,206
Tulare	7,299	46.87%	6,845	43.96%	895	5.75%	533	3.42%	0	0.00%	454	2.92%	15,572
Tuolumne	1,584	54.21%	1,057	36.17%	237	8.11%	44	1.51%	0	0.00%	527	18.04%	2,922
Ventura	2,835	39.30%	3,980	55.18%	260	3.60%	138	1.91%	0	0.00%	-1,145	-15.87%	7,213
Yolo	2,922	53.12%	2,334	42.43%	167	3.04%	78	1.42%	0	0.00%	588	10.69%	5,501
Yuba	1,980	54.49%	1,530	42.10%	93	2.56%	31	0.85%	0	0.00%	450	12.38%	3,634
Total	466,289	46.65%	462,516	46.27%	42,898	4.29%	27,713	2.77%	187	0.02%	3,773	0.38%	999,603

==== Counties that flipped from Republican to Democratic ====
- Contra Costa
- Imperial
- Placer
- Plumas
- San Luis Obispo
- Santa Barbara
- Santa Cruz
- Stanislaus

==== Counties that flipped from Democratic to Republican ====
- Marin
- Mendocino
- Napa
- San Diego
- San Mateo
- Sonoma
- Ventura
