= 1916 Ecuadorian presidential election =

- 1916
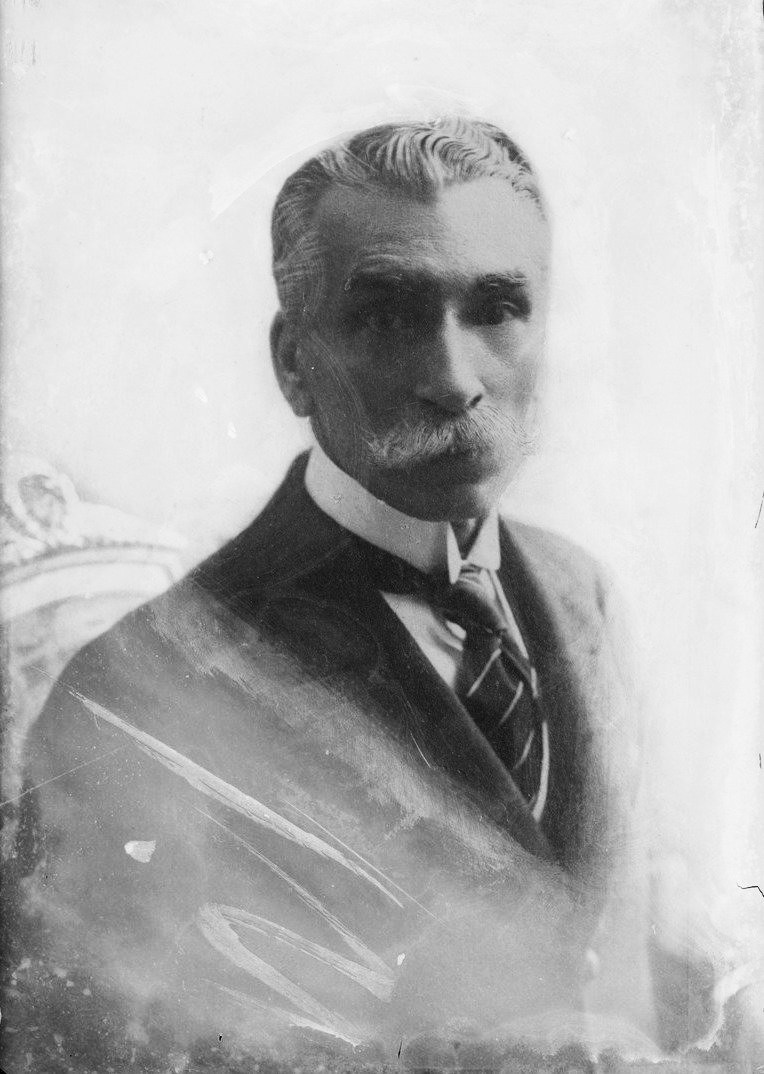

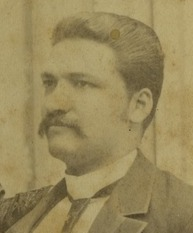
Nominee	Alfredo Baquerizo	Rafael María Arízaga
Party	Liberal	PC
Popular vote	127,303	7,502
Percentage	93.58%	5.51%
President before election
Leonidas Plaza
Liberal
Elected President
Alfredo Baquerizo
Liberal

Presidential elections were held in Ecuador in 1916. The result was a victory for Alfredo Baquerizo, who received 94% of the vote.

== Results ==
Candidate	Party	Votes	%
Alfredo Baquerizo	Liberal Party	127,303	93.58
Rafael María Arízaga	Conservative Party	7,502	5.51
Federico Intriago	Liberal Party	794	0.58
Other candidates		433	0.32
Total		136,032	100.00
Source: Nohlen, TSE
