= 1916 Texas lieutenant gubernatorial election =

- November 7, 1916
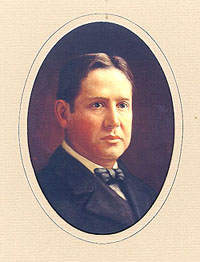

Nominee	William P. Hobby	Jerry L. Hickson
Party	Democratic	Republican
Popular vote	302,441	48,249
Percentage	82.32%	13.13%
Lieutenant Governor before election
William P. Hobby
Democratic
Elected Lieutenant Governor
William P. Hobby
Democratic

The 1916 Texas lieutenant gubernatorial election was held on November 7, 1916, in order to elect the lieutenant governor of Texas. Incumbent Democratic lieutenant governor William P. Hobby defeated Republican nominee Jerry L. Hickson, Socialist nominee N. B. Hunt and Prohibition nominee J. A. Richardson.

== General election ==
On election day, November 7, 1916, incumbent Democratic lieutenant governor William P. Hobby won re-election by a margin of 254,192 votes against his foremost opponent Republican nominee Jerry L. Hickson, thereby retaining Democratic control over the office of lieutenant governor. Hobby was sworn in for his second term on January 16, 1917.

=== Results ===
Texas lieutenant gubernatorial election, 1916
Party	Candidate	Votes	%
Democratic	William P. Hobby (incumbent)	302,441	82.32
Republican	Jerry L. Hickson	48,249	13.13
Socialist	N. B. Hunt	14,978	4.08
Prohibition	J. A. Richardson	1,735	0.47
	Scattering	2	0.00
Total votes		367,405	100.00
Democratic hold			
