= 1914 Wisconsin lieutenant gubernatorial election =

- November 3, 1914
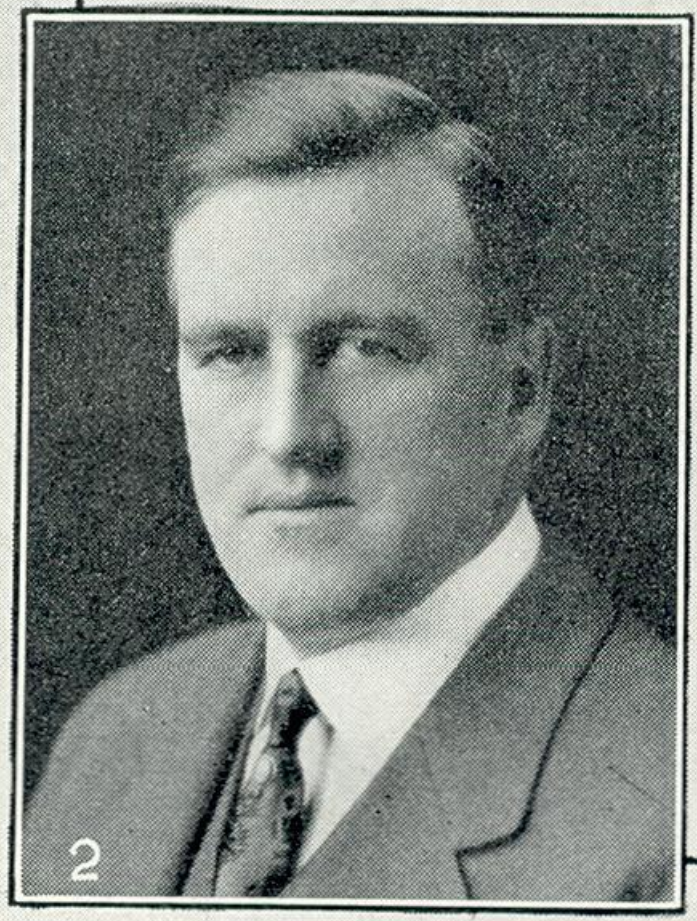

Nominee	Edward Dithmar	Melvin A. Hoyt	Robert C. McCaleb
Party	Republican	Democratic	Social Democratic
Popular vote	154,503	118,082	27,062
Percentage	50.20%	38.37%	8.79%
Lieutenant Governor before election
Thomas Morris
Republican
Elected Lieutenant Governor
Edward Dithmar
Republican

The 1914 Wisconsin lieutenant gubernatorial election was held on November 3, 1914, in order to elect the lieutenant governor of Wisconsin. Republican nominee Edward Dithmar defeated Democratic nominee Melvin A. Hoyt, Social Democratic nominee Robert C. McCaleb and Prohibition nominee Frank R. Derrick.

== Republican primary ==
The Republican primary election was held on September 1, 1914. Candidate Edward Dithmar received a plurality of the votes (29.09%) against candidate Marshall Cousins, incumbent member of the Wisconsin State Assembly Hubert H. Peavey and candidate C. F. Stout, and was thus elected as the nominee for the general election.

=== Results ===
1914 Republican lieutenant gubernatorial primary
Party	Candidate	Votes	%
Republican	Edward Dithmar	31,562	29.09%
Republican	Marshall Cousins	30,804	28.39%
Republican	Hubert H. Peavey	23,665	21.81%
Republican	C. F. Stout	22,468	20.71%
Total votes		108,509	100.00%

== Democratic primary ==
The Democratic primary election was held on September 1, 1914. Candidate Melvin A. Hoyt received a majority of the votes (51.26%) against former member of the Wisconsin State Assembly Willis Ludlow, and was thus elected as the nominee for the general election.

=== Results ===
1914 Democratic lieutenant gubernatorial primary
Party	Candidate	Votes	%
Democratic	Melvin A. Hoyt	32,932	51.26%
Democratic	Willis Ludlow	31,291	48.74%
Total votes		64,242	100.00%

== General election ==
On election day, November 3, 1914, Republican nominee Edward Dithmar won the election by a margin of 36,421 votes against his foremost opponent Democratic nominee Melvin A. Hoyt, thereby retaining Republican control over the office of lieutenant governor. Dithmar was sworn in as the 23rd lieutenant governor of Wisconsin on January 4, 1915.

=== Results ===
Wisconsin lieutenant gubernatorial election, 1914
Party	Candidate	Votes	%
Republican	Edward Dithmar	154,503	50.20
Democratic	Melvin A. Hoyt	118,082	38.37
Social Democratic	Robert C. McCaleb	27,062	8.79
Prohibition	Frank R. Derrick	7,351	2.39
	Scattering	769	0.25
Total votes		307,767	100.00
Republican hold			
