= 1916 Missouri lieutenant gubernatorial election =

- November 7, 1916
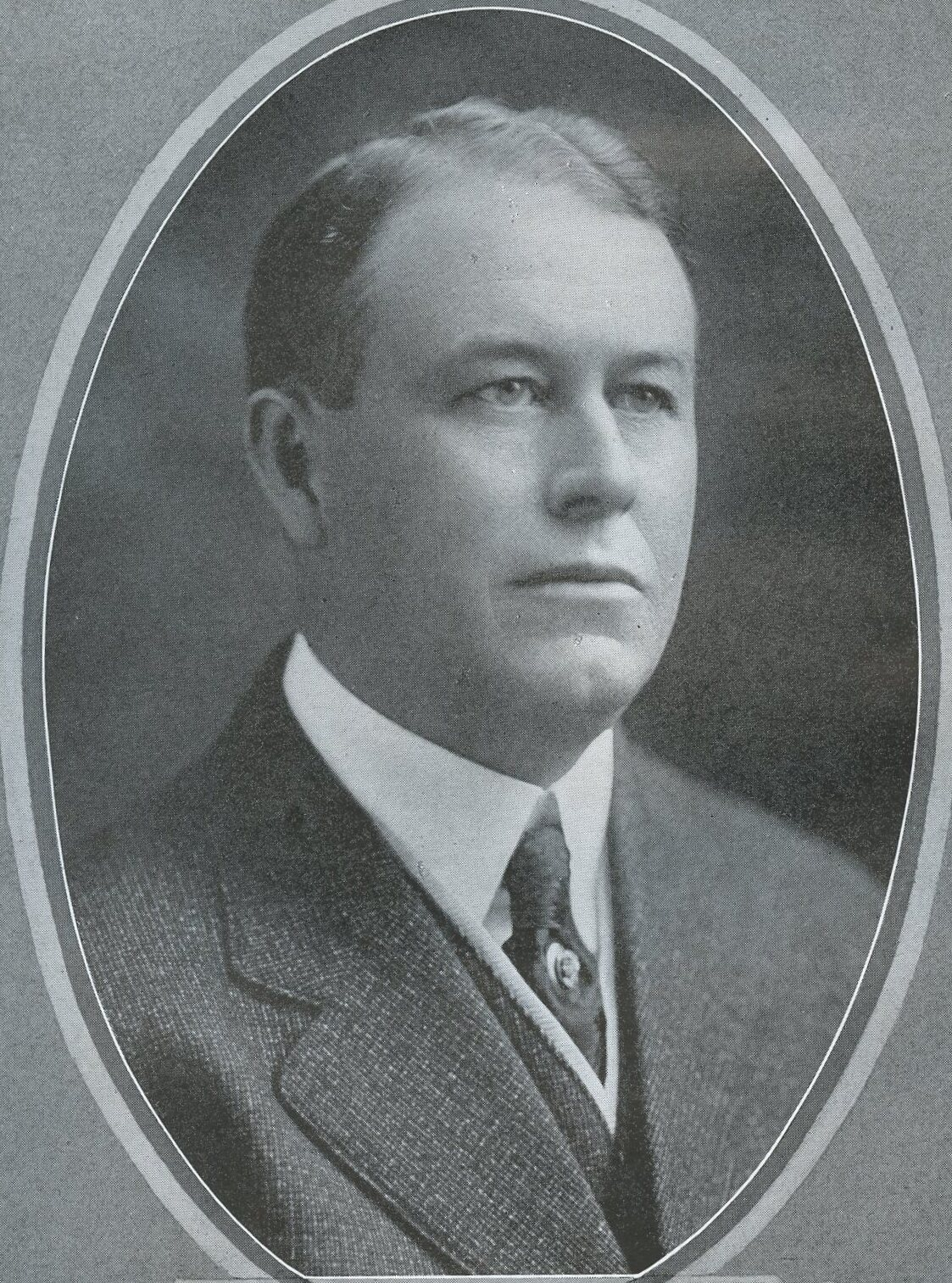

Nominee	Wallace Crossley	Roy F. Britton
Party	Democratic	Republican
Popular vote	391,113	376,532
Percentage	49.93%	48.07%
Lieutenant Governor before election
William Rock Painter
Democratic
Elected Lieutenant Governor
Wallace Crossley
Democratic

The 1916 Missouri lieutenant gubernatorial election was held on November 7, 1916, in order to elect the Lieutenant Governor of Missouri. Democratic nominee Wallace Crossley defeated Republican nominee Roy F. Britton, as well as several other candidates.

== Primary elections ==
Primary elections were held on August 1, 1916, and saw the nomination of Democratic candidate Wallace Crossley and Republican candidate Roy F. Britton.

=== Democratic primary Results ===
Democratic primary results
Party	Candidate	Votes	%
Democratic	Wallace Crossley	106,238	47.04
Democratic	Joseph J. Crites	66,260	29.34
Democratic	Philip McCollum	53,356	23.62
Total votes		225,854	100.00

=== Republican primary Results ===
Republican primary results
Party	Candidate	Votes	%
Republican	Roy F. Britton	87,297	46.59
Republican	William O. Atkeson	65,895	35.17
Republican	James J. Kyle	34,166	18.24
Total votes		187,358	100.00

== General election ==
On election day, November 7, 1916, Democratic nominee Wallace Crossley won the election by a margin of 14,581 votes against his foremost opponent Republican nominee Roy F. Britton, thereby holding Democratic control over the office of lieutenant governor. Crossley was sworn in on January 8, 1917.

=== Results ===
Missouri lieutenant gubernatorial election, 1916
Party	Candidate	Votes	%
Democratic	Wallace Crossley	391,113	49.93
Republican	Roy F. Britton	376,532	48.07
Socialist	James DeWitt Carpenter	14,657	1.87
Socialist Labor	Edward G. Middlecoff	995	0.13
Total votes		783,297	100.00
Democratic hold			

== See also ==
- 1916 Missouri gubernatorial election
