= 1914 Icelandic parliamentary election =

Parliamentary elections were held in Iceland on 10 September 1914. They were the last parliamentary elections in which only men could vote.

== Electoral system ==
The 30 elected members of the Althing were elected from single or double member constituencies by first-past-the-post voting, with six members appointed to the upper house by the Danish monarch. Suffrage was limited to men aged 25 or over and who met one of several set requirements including being a civil servant, holding a medical (or similar) degree, being a graduate of a university or seminary, or paying tax of at least four króna (or for farmers, any level of tax), and who were not in receipt of poor relief.

== Results ==
7,475 of the 13,400 registered voters participated in the elections.
