= 1914 Argentine legislative election =

- 22 March 1914
- 63 of the 120 seats in the Chamber of Deputies
- Turnout: 59.64%
| Party | Vote % | Seats | +/– |
|---|---|---|---|
| Conservative Parties | 42.15 | 32 | −25 |
| Radical Civic Union | 35.64 | 20 | +16 |
| Socialist Party | 9.30 | 7 | +7 |
| Southern League | 2.81 | 2 | +2 |
| Independents | 5.97 | 1 | +1 |
This lists parties that won seats. See the complete results below.
Results by province

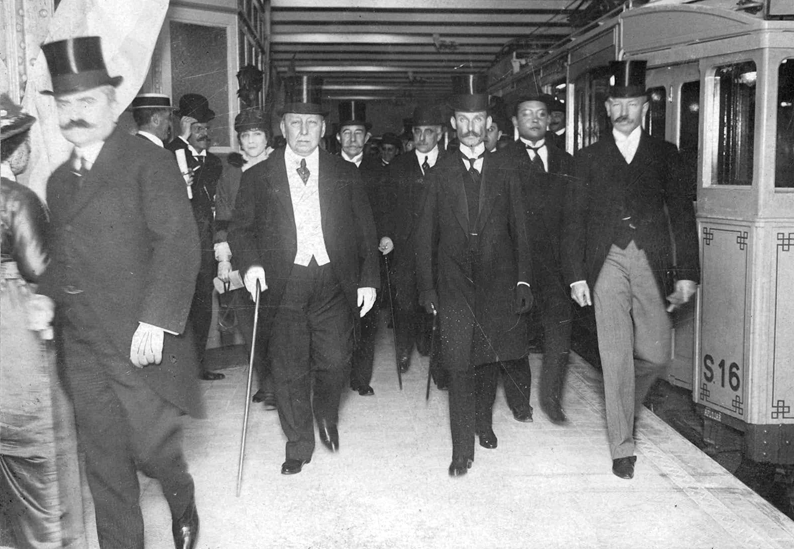
President Victorino de la Plaza (with cane) inaugurates Line A of the Buenos Aires Metro in late 1913. He continued Sáenz Peña's democratization.

Legislative elections were held in Argentina on 22 March 1914 to elect 63 of the 120 members of the Chamber of Deputies. Voter turnout was 60%.

== Background ==
The first elections following the 1912 enactment of the Sáenz Peña Law had opened Congress to myriad opposition parties to the ruling Conservatives. The UCR, which had spearheaded efforts for the law's passage (thereby extending universal suffrage to nearly all male citizens), emerged as the chief minority party in the Chamber of Deputies (Lower House); but remained doubtful as to the transparency of Senate and gubernatorial elections in a number of districts, notably the important Buenos Aires Province. Advised to do so by their longtime leader, Hipólito Yrigoyen, the UCR maintained their boycott of races beyond those of the Chamber of Deputies.

President Roque Sáenz Peña's deteriorating health cast a pall over these elections, and his indefinite transference of presidential power to Vice President Victorino de la Plaza saw the second-in-command continue the ailing president's policies in place, as the elections proceeded on Sunday, March 22, as scheduled.

Amid somewhat lower turnout, results were mixed: The UCR continued to make gains in the Chamber of Deputies, the lower house of Argentina's National Congress, electing 19 of the 60 seats at stake. They fared particularly well in Entre Ríos and Santa Fe Province, in which latter they received more than twice the votes of Santa Fe native Lisandro de la Torre's Southern League. The Socialist Party again defeated the UCR in the City of Buenos Aires, however, and by a wider margin than in 1913. Conservative Buenos Aires Province lawmaker Marcelino Ugarte, who had defeated the UCR in the 1913 Senate race, did so again in this year's gubernatorial contest, and became his party's effective leader. The Civic Union, representing those who broke from the UCR after its 1890 founding, continued to erode in influence, and following these elections, Honorio Pueyrredón announced its reunification with the UCR.

== Results ==
| Party or alliance | | Votes | % | Seats | |
| Party or alliance | | Votes | % | Won | Total |
|---|---|---|---|---|---|
| Conservative Parties | Conservative Party | 69,661 | 11.78 | 10 | – |
| Conservative Parties | Democratic Union | 22,258 | 3.76 | 2 | – |
| Conservative Parties | Provincial Party | 21,339 | 3.61 | 2 | – |
| Conservative Parties | Liberal–Autonomist Pact | 19,783 | 3.34 | 4 | – |
| Conservative Parties | Conservative Concentration | 19,139 | 3.24 | 4 | – |
| Conservative Parties | Democratic Party of Córdoba | 18,875 | 3.19 | 2 | – |
| Conservative Parties | Popular Party | 15,453 | 2.61 | 2 | – |
| Conservative Parties | Constitutional Party | 15,193 | 2.57 | 0 | – |
| Conservative Parties | Official Party | 11,509 | 1.95 | 2 | – |
| Conservative Parties | Provincial Union | 10,389 | 1.76 | 2 | – |
| Conservative Parties | Civic Concentration | 10,194 | 1.72 | 1 | – |
| Conservative Parties | Dissident Liberal Party | 8,937 | 1.51 | 1 | — |
| Conservative Parties | Carbosistas | 6,615 | 1.12 | 0 | – |
| Conservative Parties | Total | 249,345 | 42.15 | 32 | 65 |
| Radical Civic Union | | 210,843 | 35.64 | 20 | 29 |
| Socialist Party | | 55,014 | 9.30 | 7 | 9 |
| Civic Union | | 20,222 | 3.42 | 0 | 6 |
| Southern League | | 16,601 | 2.81 | 2 | 3 |
| Popular Union | | 2,863 | 0.48 | 0 | 0 |
| Liberal Party of Buenos Aires City | | 815 | 0.14 | 0 | 0 |
| Nationalist Party | | 588 | 0.10 | 0 | 0 |
| Independents | | 35,307 | 5.97 | 1 | 1 |
| National Union | | | | – | 5 |
| Vacant | | | | 1 | 2 |
| Total | | 591,598 | 100.00 | 63 | 120 |
| Valid votes | | 591,598 | 96.53 | | |
| Invalid/blank votes | | 21,253 | 3.47 | | |
| Total votes | | 612,851 | 100.00 | | |
| Registered voters/turnout | | 1,027,542 | 59.64 | | |
Source: Cantón, Chamber of Deputies
