= 1903 Icelandic parliamentary election =

Parliamentary elections were held in Iceland in June 1903.

== Electoral system ==
The 30 elected members of the Althing were elected from single or double member constituencies by a three-round system; in the first two rounds, a candidate receiving a majority of the vote was elected; if seats were still unfilled after the second round, a third round was held using first-past-the-post voting. Voting took place at a single polling place in each constituency and was done publicly. A further six members were appointed to the upper house by the Danish monarch.

Suffrage was limited to men aged 25 or over who were not in receipt of poor relief and who met one of several set requirements including being a civil servant, being a graduate of a university or seminary, or meeting various tax criteria (for farmers, paying more than the minimum tax; for burghers or fishermen, paying eight króna of local taxes; for property owners, paying twelve króna of local property taxes). This limited the number of voters to 7,786 from a population of 79,632.

== Results ==
4,155 of the 7,786 registered voters participated in the elections. The result was a victory for the Home Rule Party.
