= 1914 Dominican Republic general election =

General elections were held in the Dominican Republic in 1914. Juan Isidro Jimenes Pereyra was elected president, defeating Horacio Vásquez and Luis Felipe Vidal.

== Results ==
=== President ===
The president was elected in a two-stage process, with voters electing an electoral college, which then elected the president. Different publications give different figures for the public vote; the El Radical newspaper published final results on 1 December 1914 with Vásquez' Red Party and the pro-government Partido Legalista of Luis Felipe Vidal receiving 37,858 votes and the Jimenes–Velásquez alliance receiving 36,405; in 1940 Sumner Welles published volume II of Naboth's Vineyard: The Dominican Republic, 1844–1924 stating Jimenes had received 40,076 votes, while Vásquez and Vidal received a combined total of 39,632.

Candidate	Party	Votes	%
Juan Isidro Jimenes Pereyra	Jimenes–Velásquez alliance	337	53.32
Horacio Vásquez	Red Party	242	38.29
Luis Felipe Vidal	Legalist Party	53	8.39
Total		632	100.00
Source: Campillo Pérez

=== Senate ===
Party	Seats
Jimenes–Velásquez alliance	7
Red Party	4
Legalist Party	1
Total	12
Source: Campillo Pérez

=== Chamber of Deputies ===
Party	Seats
Jimenes–Velásquez alliance	14
Red Party	8
Legalist Party	2
Total	24
Source: Campillo Pérez
