= 1916 Bolivian legislative election =

Legislative elections were held in Bolivia in May 1916 to elect half the seats of the Chamber Deputies and one-third of the Senate.

== Results ==
Party	Votes	%	Seats					
Party	Votes	%	Chamber			Senate		
Party	Votes	%	Elected	Total	+/–	Elected	Total	+/–
Liberal Party			35	69	0	5	16	0
Socialist Party			0	1	0	0	0	0
Total			35	70	0	5	16	0
Source: Cáceres

=== Elected members ===
The new senators were:

- Zenón C. Orias, PL (Chuquisaca)
- Germán Zegarra, PL (Cochabamba)
- César M. Ochávez, PL (Cochabamba)
- Julio Zamora, PL (Oruro)
- Atiliano Aparicio, PL (Oruro)
