= Louise M. Harvey Clarke =

Doctor and writer (1859–1934)

- Born: 1859
- Died: 1934 (aged 74–75)
- Occupations: medical doctor, writer, speaker

Louise M. Harvey Clarke (1859–1934) was a medical doctor and widely known writer, speaker, and clubwoman in Los Angeles and Riverside counties, California.

== Personal life ==
Louise Harvey was born on November 8, 1859, in Athens, Maine.

She was married in Los Angeles on July 3, 1898, to Ernest Perley Clarke, editor and publisher of the Riverside Press, with the Rev. A.C. Williams officiating. Her husband died on September 20, 1933. She died in 1934.

== Description ==
In 1895, a San Francisco Call reporter wrote this about Harvey after she spoke at a meeting in Santa Barbara:

. . . when Dr. Louise Harvey came forward to present her paper, the beautiful face of this cultivated young woman, who has entered into this, the latest and most sensible type of philanthropic work, chained the attention of the audience. . . . Somebody asked, "What, then, is the highest type of Altruism? Gently and thoughtfully, but unhesitatingly[,] the young physician repllied: "I think it is to give one's self, not to give one's life to die for humanity, but to live for it."

== Education and professional life ==
She earned her medical degree in 1892 from the Woman's Medical College of Pennsylvania.

In 1893 she and other women organized and conducted the Detroit Free Dispensary for Women and Children on the southeast corner of State Street and Park Place.

From 1894 to 1897 Harvey was affiliated with the School of Medicine at the University of Southern California.

Harvey was appointed sanitary inspector by the city on May 15, 1895, without pay, to assist a settlement association which was tending to the welfare of the Sonoratown, Los Angeles, neighborhood, inhabited principally by Latinos. The city's Board of Health at the same meeting asked the City Council to print circulars in Spanish "giving the sanitary rules."

She was "deeply interested in the Social Settlement work in Sonoratown." In 1896 Harvey was the "resident physician" of the Orphans Home Association.

In January 1902, Louise Harvey Clarke was elected president of the Riverside County Medical Society.

In 1905 Clarke spent three months in "special hospital study" in Philadelphia and New York.

== Volunteer work ==
She was a member of the Friday Morning Club of Los Angeles.

In 1903 she organized a Riverside chapter of the Business and Professional Women's Club, becoming its first president. In 1903 also, Harvey was on the board of directors of the local humane society. In 1905 she was the first president of the newly organized Young Women's Christian Association in Riverside.

Clarke took part in the Woman's Parliament of Southern California in 1895, 1905, and 1910.

She was a Republican elector in the 1916 Presidential election.

She was a member of the board of directors of the Riverside city and county libraries in 1921 and 1923.

== Sampling of papers read aloud ==
- The Trained Nurse, January 1894.
- Child Culture, August 1894, addressing "proper food, dress, and general habits. . . . If one-half the money expended in this state for criminals be given to the kindergarten, what a world of good would be done."
- The Science of Foods, September 1894.
- Hygiene and Education, May 1896.
- City Missions, May 1896, "the urgent need of all kinds of work among the poor."
- Mothers and Daughters, May 1897.
- The Causes of Malpractice, May 1897.
- The Moral and Physical Training of Children, September 1897.
- The Medical Profession and the Press, October 1902.
- The Work of Newspaper Women, April 1909.
