= 1914 Texas lieutenant gubernatorial election =

- November 3, 1914
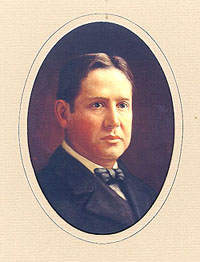

Nominee	William P. Hobby	W. S. Noble	John Hall
Party	Democratic	Socialist	Republican
Popular vote	178,142	25,015	11,389
Percentage	82.18%	11.54%	5.25%
Lieutenant Governor before election
Vacant
Elected Lieutenant Governor
William P. Hobby
Democratic

The 1914 Texas lieutenant gubernatorial election was held on November 3, 1914, in order to elect the lieutenant governor of Texas. Democratic nominee William P. Hobby defeated Socialist nominee W. S. Noble, Republican nominee John Hall and Progressive nominee George E. Kepple.

== General election ==
On election day, November 3, 1914, Democratic nominee William P. Hobby won the election by a margin of 153,127 votes against his foremost opponent Socialist nominee W. S. Noble, thereby retaining Democratic control over the office of lieutenant governor. Hobby was sworn in as the 24th lieutenant governor of Texas on January 19, 1915.

=== Results ===
Texas lieutenant gubernatorial election, 1914
Party	Candidate	Votes	%
Democratic	William P. Hobby	178,142	82.18
Socialist	W. S. Noble	25,015	11.54
Republican	John Hall	11,389	5.25
Progressive	George E. Kepple	1,715	0.79
	Scattering	520	0.24
Total votes		216,781	100.00
Democratic hold			
