= 1914 Swiss constitutional referendum =

Referendum in Switzerland

25 October 1914
- Federal decree regarding the revision of Article 103 of the Federal Constitution and the inclusion of an Article 114 bis in the Federal Constitution

Results
Choice	Votes	%
Yes	204,394	62.35%
No	123,431	37.65%
Valid votes	327,825	87.43%
Invalid or blank votes	47,152	12.57%
Total votes	374,977	100.00%
Registered voters/turnout	851,082	44.06%

A constitutional referendum was held in Switzerland on 25 October 1914. The proposed amendments of article 103 and the addition of article 114bis were approved by 62.3% of voters and a majority of cantons.

== Background ==
In order to pass, any amendments to the constitution needed a double majority; a majority of the popular vote and majority of the cantons. The decision of each canton was based on the vote in that canton. Full cantons counted as one vote, whilst half cantons counted as half.

== Results ==
Choice	Popular vote		Cantons		
Choice	Votes	%	Full	Half	Total
For	204,394	62.3	16	4	18
Against	123,431	37.7	3	2	4
Blank votes	33,104	–	–	–	–
Invalid votes	14,048	–	–	–	–
Total	374,977	100	19	6	22
Registered voters/turnout	851,082	44.1	–	–	–
Source: Nohlen & Stöver
