= Clifford B. Wilson =

American politician (1879–1943)

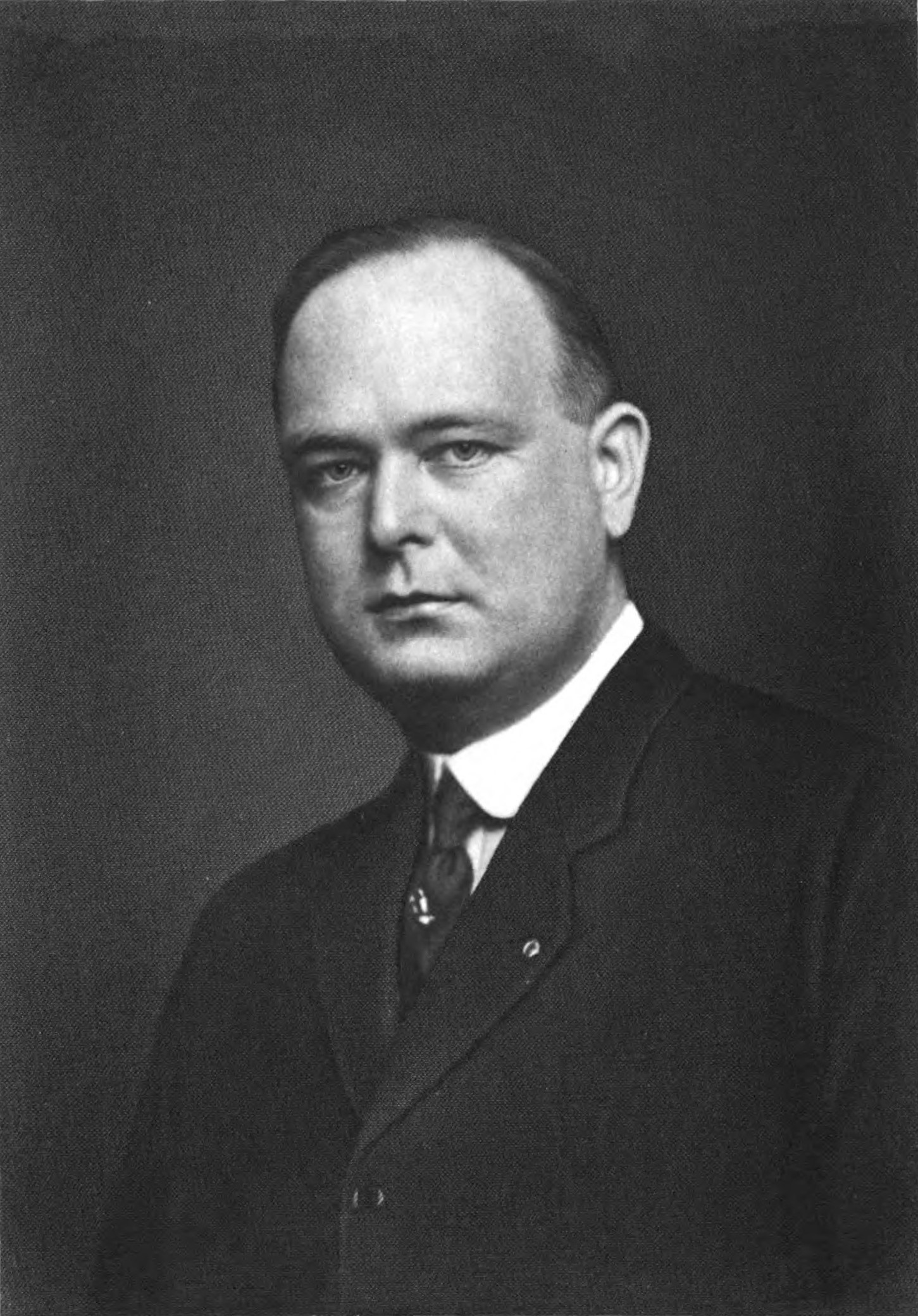
Clifford B. Wilson in 1917

Clifford Brittin Wilson (December 2, 1879 – January 1, 1943) was an American politician who was the 76th lieutenant governor of Connecticut from 1915 to 1921 and a mayor of Bridgeport, Connecticut.

== Early life ==
Clifford B. Wilson was born in Bridgeport, Fairfield County, Connecticut, December 2, 1879. His parents were James A. Wilson and Mary E. (Wordin) Wilson. He was a lawyer. On November 10, 1914, he married Anastasia C. Dorsey.

== Political career ==
Wilson was a Republican. He was elected mayor of Bridgeport in 1911 and continued until 1921, after losing an election. He was also elected Lieutenant Governor of Connecticut in November 1914. He served as lieutenant governor for three consecutive two-year terms, from January 6, 1915 to January 5, 1921, for the whole time that Marcus H. Holcomb was the governor of the state.

He tried to become mayor of Bridgeport again in 1935, but lost.

== Later years ==
Wilson died from a heart attack, in Weston, Fairfield County, Connecticut, on January 1, 1943.

== See also ==
- List of governors of Connecticut

Political offices
Preceded by Lyman T. Tingier	Lieutenant Governor of Connecticut; 1915–1921	Succeeded by Charles A. Templeton
