= Marshall Cousins =

American politician (1869–1939)

Marshall Cousins (September 4, 1869 – February 28, 1939) was an American businessman, historian, military officer, and politician.

Cousins was born in Eau Claire, Wisconsin and went to the Eau Claire public schools. He was involved with the lumber and banking business. In 1888, Cousins joined the Wisconsin National Guard and was commissioned a colonel in 1916. He was involved in the Mexican Border dispute, the Spanish–American War, and World War I. He served in the Wisconsin Assembly in 1895 and 1896 from Eau Claire and was a Republican. Cousins was with the Wisconsin Historical Society and wrote articles about various topics, including the history of banking in Wisconsin. Cousins also served as the Wisconsin Banking Commissioner. He lived in Madison, Wisconsin. He died from injuries after being hit by an automobile in Madison, Wisconsin.
