= Icelandic króna =

Currency of Iceland

íslensk króna (Icelandic)
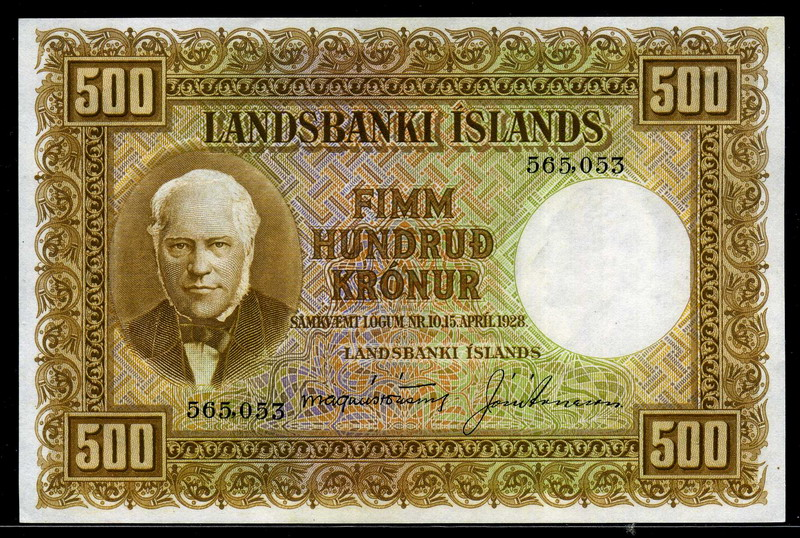
- 500-krónur banknote (Law of 1928) of the first Icelandic krona, featuring the image of Jon Sigurdsson

ISO 4217
- Code: ISK (numeric: 352) before 1980: ISJ

Units of account
- Base unit: króna
- Plural: krónur
- Symbol: kr
- Subunit
- 1/100: eyrir
- Plural
- eyrir: aurar
- Symbol
- eyrir: a

Denominations
- Banknotes: 500, 1,000, 2,000, 5,000, 10,000 króna
- Coins: 1, 5, 10, 50, 100 króna

Demographics
- User(s): Iceland

Issuance
- Central bank: Central Bank of Iceland
- Website: cb.is
- Printer: De La Rue
- Mint: Royal Mint

Valuation
- Inflation: 4.0%
- Source: Central Bank of Iceland, August 2025
- Method: Consumer price index

The króna (Icelandic pronunciation: [ˈkʰrouːna]) or krona (sometimes called Icelandic crown; sign: kr; code: ISK) (Note: In English the plural is usually "krona", some authors use "kronur". In Icelandic the plural is "krónur".) is the currency of Iceland. One króna was formerly divided into 100 aurar (singular "eyrir"; alternative singular "aur", and maybe more used, informally).

== Name ==
Like the other Nordic currencies (such as the Danish krone, Swedish krona and Norwegian krone) that participated in the historical Scandinavian Monetary Union, the name króna (meaning crown) comes from the Latin word corona ("crown").

The name "Icelandic crown" is sometimes used alternatively, for example, in the financial markets.

== First krona, 1874–1981 ==
The Danish krone was introduced to Iceland in 1874, replacing the earlier Danish currency, the rigsdaler. In 1885, Iceland began issuing its own banknotes.

The Icelandic krona separated from the Danish krone after the dissolution of the Scandinavian Monetary Union at the start of World War I and Icelandic sovereignty from Denmark in 1918. The first coins were issued in 1922.

Iceland was forced to devalue the Icelandic krona in 1922 by 23% against the Danish krone, which saw the beginning of an independent monetary policy in Iceland, and was to be the first of many subsequent devaluations of the krona.

In 1925, the krona was pegged to the British pound for the next 14 years until the spring of 1939. Later in 1939 the currency was pegged to the US dollar, which was maintained until 1949.

=== Coins ===
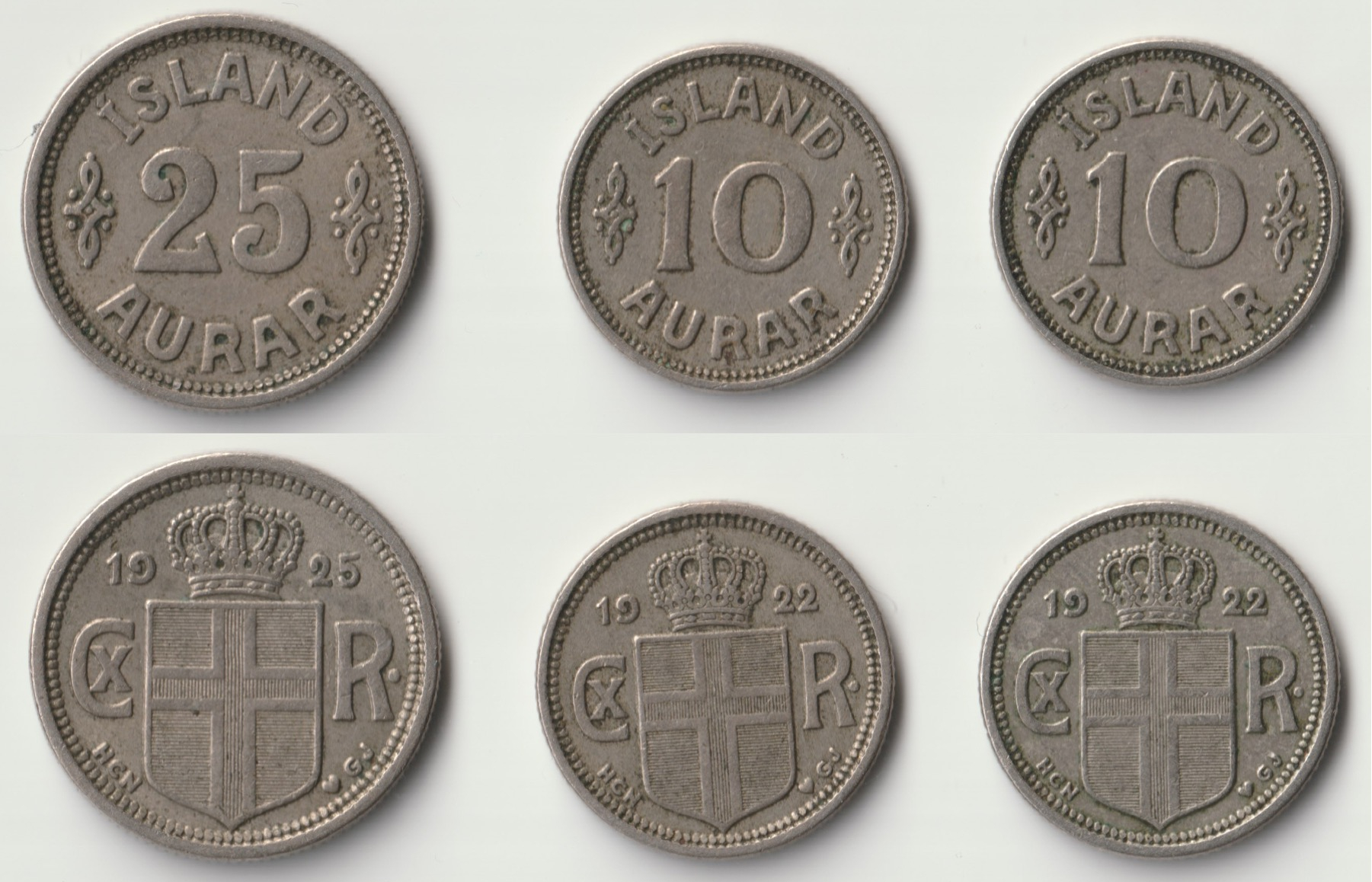
The 10 and 25 aurar coins introduced in 1922

Iceland's first coins were 10 and 25 aurar pieces introduced in 1922. These were followed in 1925 by 1 krona and 2 krona pieces and in 1926 by 1, 2, and 5 aurar pieces. In 1946, the coins' designs were altered to remove the royal monogram (CXR), following abolition of the Icelandic monarchy (which had formed a personal union with Denmark) in 1944.

Starting in 1967, new coins were introduced due to a considerable fall in the value of the krona. 10 krona coins were introduced in that year, followed by 50 aurar and 5 krona pieces in 1969 and 50 krona pieces in 1970.

=== Banknotes ===
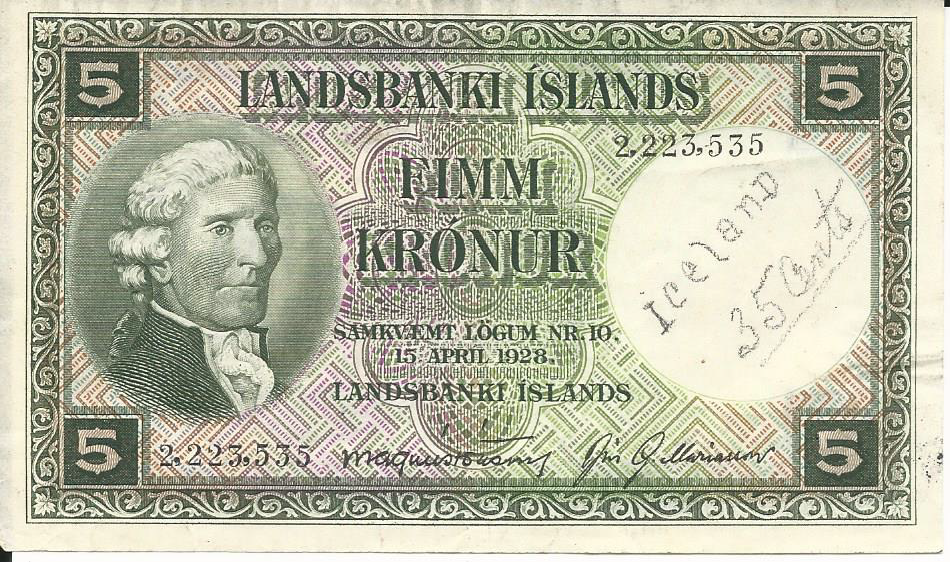
A 1928 5 krónur note issued by the Landsbanki Íslands.

The first notes issued in 1885 by the Landssjóður Íslands were in denominations of 5, 10, and 50 krona. In 1904, the Bank of Iceland (Íslands Banki) took over note production and introduced 100 krona notes. In 1921, the Ríkissjóður Íslands began issuing paper money, with notes for 1, 5, 10 and 50 krona.

In 1928, another bank, the Landsbanki Íslands, took over issuance of denominations of 5 krona and above, with the Ríkissjóður Íslands continuing to issue 1 krona notes until 1947. The Landsbanki Íslands introduced 500 krona notes in 1935, followed by 25 and 1000 krona notes in 1957.

In 1961, the Seðlabanki Íslands became the central bank of Iceland and started issuing paper money, in denominations of 10, 25, 100, and 500 krona. They were manufactured in England by De la Rue.

== Second krona, 1981–present ==
In 1981, the Icelandic krona was revalued, due to high inflation, with 100 old krona (ISJ) being worth 1 new krona (ISK) and a new 500 krona banknote was first put into circulation in 1981. The 1000 krona was put into circulation in 1984 and the 5000 krona in 1986. The 2000 krona banknote was put into circulation in 1995 but never became very popular. The 10,000 krona banknote was put into circulation in 2013.

Coins of less than one krona have not circulated for many years. In September 2002, Davíð Oddsson, the Icelandic Prime Minister at the time, signed two regulations decreeing that all monetary amounts on invoices and financial claims should be stated and paid in whole krona only and that coins with a value of less than one krona should be withdrawn from circulation. In 2007, the eyrir formally ceased to exist as a subunit of the Icelandic króna.

=== Coins ===
In 1981, coins were introduced in denominations of 5, 10, and 50 aurar (cents), 1 krona and 5 krona. These were followed by 10 krona pieces in 1984, 50 krona in 1987 and 100 krona in 1995. Since 2003, Icelandic banks no longer accept any coins denominated in aurar (cents).

Second series (1981–1995)
Image	Value	Technical parameters			Description			Issued from	Lapse
Image	Value	Diameter (mm)	Mass (g)	Composition	Edge	Obverse	Reverse	Issued from	Lapse
	5 a	15.00	1.50	Bronze: Cu: 97% Zn: 2.5% Sn: 0.5%	Smooth	Bird	Common skate (Raja batis)	1981	1 October 2004
	10 a	17.00	2.00	Bronze: Cu: 97% Zn: 2.5% Sn: 0.5%	Smooth	Bull	Squid (Cephalopoda)	1981	1 October 2004
	50 a	19.50	3.00	Bronze: Cu: 97% Zn: 2.5% Sn: 0.5%	Smooth	Dragon	Shrimp (Pandalus borealis)	1981	1 October 2004
	50 a	19.50	2.65	Copper-plated steel	Smooth	Dragon	Shrimp (Pandalus borealis)	1986	1 October 2004
	1 kr.	21.50	4.50	Cupronickel: Cu: 75%, Ni: 25%	Reeded	Mountain giant	Atlantic cod (Gadus morhua)	1981–1987	Current
	1 kr.	21.50	4.00	Nickel-plated steel	Reeded	Mountain giant	Atlantic cod (Gadus morhua)	1989	Current
	5 kr.	24.50	6.50	Cupronickel: Cu: 75%, Ni: 25%	Reeded	Land wights	Two common dolphins (Delphinus delphis)	1981–1992	Current
	5 kr.	24.50	5.60	Nickel-plated steel	Reeded	Land wights	Two common dolphins (Delphinus delphis)	1996	Current
	10 kr.	27.50	8.00	Cupronickel: Cu: 75%, Ni: 25%	Reeded	Land wights	Four capelin (Mallotus villosus)	1984–1994	Current
	10 kr.	27.50	6.90	Nickel-plated steel	Reeded	Land wights	Four capelin (Mallotus villosus)	1996	Current
	50 kr.	23.00	8.25	Nickel brass: Cu: 70%; Zn: 24.5%; Ni: 5.5%	Reeded	Land wights	Shore crab (Carcinus maenas)	1987	Current
	100 kr.	25.50	8.50	Nickel brass: Cu: 70%; Zn: 24.5%; Ni: 5.5%	Interrupted reeding	Land wights	Lumpfish (Cyclopterus lumpus)	1995	Current
For table standards, see the coin specification table.

=== Banknotes ===
Icelandic banknotes are printed with the dates from which the legal basis of the currency derives. In 1981, notes were issued in denominations of 10, 50, 100 and 500 krona based on the law of 29 March 1961. 1000 krona notes were introduced in 1984, followed by 5000 krona notes in 1986 with the same law.

100, 500, and 1000 krona notes were reissued in 1994 under the law of 5 May 1986. In the following year, a new denomination of 2000 krona was issued for the first time. The 2000 krona note is subtly different from the other notes. For example, the underprint pattern extends all the way upward and downward, while the other denominations had white margins on every side. The number 2000 is printed in multi color for 3 of the 4 occurrences. And the numeral 2000 on the lower left corner of reverse is vertical. The "shadow" of the numeral is printed with SÍ in microprint.

The 22 May 2001 series, saw substantial changes. The underprint and microprint features of the 2000 krona note were extended to other denominations. The 1000 and 5000 krona notes also received metallic foils next to the portrait.

In 2013, a new 10000 krona banknote was introduced. The face of natural scientist and poet Jónas Hallgrímsson appears on the bill, as well as the Eurasian golden plover. Notes of 100 krona or less are no longer in circulation, as they have been withdrawn by the central bank.

Cultural scholars series Designers: Kristín Þorkelsdóttir and Stephen Fairbairn
Image	Value	Dimensions (mm)	Main colour	Description		Law	Issued from	Withdrawn
Image	Value	Dimensions (mm)	Main colour	Obverse	Reverse	Law	Issued from	Withdrawn
	10 kr.	130 × 70	Dark blue	Arngrímur Jónsson	Old Icelandic household (Auguste Mayer); Household implements	1961	1981	2007
	50 kr.	135 × 70	Brown	Guðbrandur Þorláksson	Printmakers from 16th century; Book knot from a bible	1961	1981	2007
	100 kr.	140 × 70	Green	Árni Magnússon	Monastic scribe; Door ornament (Svarfaðardalur)	1961; 1986	1981	2007
	500 kr.	145 × 70	Red	Jón Sigurðsson	Jón at his writing desk; Menntaskólinn í Reykjavík	1961; 1986; 2001	1981	Current
	500 kr.	145 × 70	Red	Jón Sigurðsson	Jón at his writing desk; Menntaskólinn í Reykjavík	2001 2019	2005	Current
	1000 kr.	150 × 70	Purple	Brynjólfur Sveinsson	Brynjólfskirkja church, Skálholt; Madonna on a golden ring	1961; 1986; 2001	1984	Current
	1000 kr.	150 × 70	Purple	Brynjólfur Sveinsson	Brynjólfskirkja church, Skálholt; Madonna on a golden ring	2001	2004	Current
	2000 kr.	150 × 70	Brown	Jóhannes Kjarval	Yearning for Flight and Woman and Flowers by Kjarval	1986	1995	Current
	5000 kr.	155 × 70	Blue green	Ragnheiður Jónsdóttir	Ragnheiður instructing in embroidery; Initials in embroidery pattern	1961	1986	Current
	5000 kr.	155 × 70	Blue green	Ragnheiður Jónsdóttir	Ragnheiður instructing in embroidery; Initials in embroidery pattern	2001 2019	2003	Current
	10000 kr.	162 × 70	Blue	Jónas Hallgrímsson	Plover; Skjaldbreiður (drawing); Fjallið Skjaldbreiður (poem) by Jónas	2001	2013	Current
	10000 kr.	162 × 70	Blue	Jónas Hallgrímsson	Plover; Skjaldbreiður (drawing); Fjallið Skjaldbreiður (poem) by Jónas	2019	2013	Current

== Issues affecting the Icelandic krona ==
Iceland is not a member of the European Union and does not use the euro. The Icelandic currency is a low-volume world currency, strongly managed by its central bank. Its value in terms of other currencies has historically been swift to change, for example against the US and Canadian dollars, and the other Nordic currencies (Swedish krona, Norwegian krone, Danish krone, Finnish Markka up to its replacement by the euro), and the euro. For example, during the first half of 2006, the Icelandic krona ranged between 50 and 80 per US dollar. Prior to the currency's collapse in October 2008, the krona was considered overvalued.

In most shops electronic payment is accepted. Other currencies are very rarely accepted in Iceland. A notable exception is Keflavík International Airport (which has many transfer passengers), where the US dollar, euro and some other currencies are accepted by all merchants. Certain stores in central Reykjavík accept some foreign currencies.

Iceland's per capita computer usage is among the highest in the world, far higher than the UK or US. The saturation of technology in Iceland has had ramifications in the monetary system: a very high proportion of payments in Iceland are made electronically, e.g. by debit or credit cards or online bank transfers. The largest denomination banknote, the 10000 krona note ( €66.89/US$72.25 in August 2024 ), has a relatively low value; therefore, most of Iceland's high value trades are done in electronic transfers and in other currencies.

=== 2008 financial crisis ===
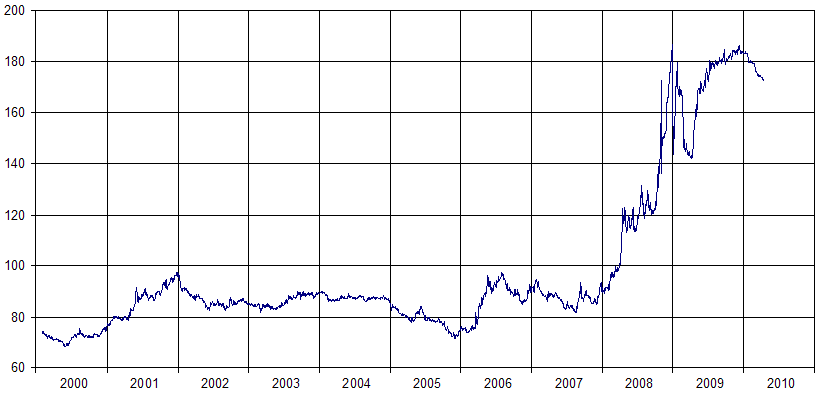
Exchange rate ISK per euro from 2000 to mid-2010

In October 2008, the 2008 financial crisis led to a collapse of the Icelandic banking sector. The value of the Icelandic krona dropped, and on 7 October 2008 the Icelandic Central Bank attempted to peg it at 131 against the euro. This peg was abandoned the next day. The krona later dropped again and to 340 against the euro before trade in the currency was suspended (by comparison, the rate at the start of 2008 was about 90 krona to the euro). After a period of tentative, very low-volume international trading in the krona, activity had been expected to pick up again throughout November 2008, albeit still with low liquidity, as Iceland secured an International Monetary Fund loan. However, as of January 2009 the krona was still not being traded regularly, with the European Central Bank (ECB) reference rate being set only intermittently, the last time on 3 December 2008 at 290 krona per euro.

The Icelandic krona similarly fell in value against the US dollar, from around 50 to 80 per dollar to about 110–115 per dollar; by mid-November 2008 it had continued to lower to 135 to the dollar. As of 2 April 2009, the value hovered around 119 per dollar, roughly maintaining that value over the next two years with 23 March 2011, prices around 114 per dollar. With this, the previously high costs for foreign traders and tourists dropped, which Iceland's trade and tourism industry undertook to exploit. In July 2008, a Big Mac cost the equivalent of nearly US$6, versus $3.57 in the US.

=== Iceland and the euro ===
Theoretically, the adoption of the euro could have several advantages. Adopting what is perceived by some as a historically stronger currency might help Iceland to "avoid the turbulence surrounding speculations in international financial markets". In addition, Icelandic economists listed several arguments in favour of the euro before the crisis. "In terms of growth potentials and welfare, the euro could be expected to bring lower long-term interest rates [...]. This would, of course, increase capital investment and labour productivity. The euro might lower consumer prices by facilitating a comparison with other euro countries." Because of the volatility between the euro and the krona, former Foreign Minister Valgerður Sverrisdóttir considered the idea that Iceland might dollarize itself into the Eurozone without joining the European Union.

Opinion regarding the euro is mixed among Icelanders. An opinion poll about Iceland joining the European Union released on 11 September 2007 showed that 53% of respondents were in favour of adopting the euro, 37% opposed, and 10% undecided. Another poll produced for the Icelandic newspaper Fréttablaðið and released on 30 September 2007 showed 56% opposed to euro adoption and 44% in favour. In January 2008, a poll by the Icelandic Chamber of Commerce put support for Iceland abandoning the krona for another currency at 63%. Several companies in Iceland, such as Össur, have started to pay their employees in euros or US dollars, mainly due to the high inflation and high volatility.

The 2008 financial crisis prompted further calls for Iceland to join the Eurozone. In January 2009, one senior Icelandic official stated that due to the crisis, "the krona is dead. We need a new currency. The only serious option is the euro." In March 2009, a report by Iceland's Minister for Foreign Affairs, Össur Skarphédinsson, considered three options: retaining the krona, adopting the euro without joining the EU, and adopting the euro through EU membership. The report recommended the third option.

An economic study of the impact of the adoption of the euro by Iceland found that the Icelandic krona acts both as a barrier and buffer to international trade, and that by joining the EU and adopting the euro, Icelandic international trade might be 60% higher.

In July 2009, the Alþingi (parliament) narrowly voted to apply for EU membership, but that application has been frozen since 2013 (see accession of Iceland to the European Union).

In March 2015, Icelandic authorities announced by letter to the Presidency of the Council of the European Union that Iceland should not be seen as a candidate state, and that there were no specific plans to continue any membership process. Leaders of the ruling government parties have also stated that the krona will remain as Iceland's currency for at least the foreseeable future.

=== Iceland and unilateral adoption of another currency ===
There was a discussion in 2012 about the feasibility of adopting a foreign currency. The idea of adopting the Canadian dollar was popular, and the Canadian ambassador to Iceland stated that Iceland could adopt the currency if it so wished. Canada was favoured due to its northern geography and similar resource-based economy, in addition to its relative economic stability.

Arnór Sighvatsson, Deputy Governor of the Central Bank of Iceland, at a meeting of the Icelandic Federation of Labour on 10 January 2012, said:

I am of the view that unilateral adoption of a foreign currency or a currency board could only be considered prudent if all of Iceland's largest banks were owned by a strong foreign bank with the financial strength to provide them with liquidity during times of distress. Second, unilateral adoption of another currency is a solution that is hardly worth considering unless EMU (Economic and Monetary Union of the European Union) membership has been ruled out for the foreseeable future, as it entails extra cost of purchase of new base money for the banking system (generally in the range of 70–100 billion krona in recent years) and larger precautionary foreign exchange reserves (particularly if the banks are not foreign-owned). It would be pointless to pay that price for a few years' benefit, plus the seigniorage that would revert permanently to the ECB European Central Bank. Currencies other than the euro have also been mentioned. But considering the characteristics required of such a currency, there is no other that comes close to being as beneficial for Iceland as the euro is.

As of 2018, Icelandic authorities had no plans to adopt a foreign currency.

=== Exchange rate ===
- As of 3 March 2026, 1 US$ is worth 123.95 Icelandic kronur.

Current ISK exchange rates
From Google Finance:	AUD CAD CHF CNY EUR GBP HKD JPY USD DKK NOK SEK
From Yahoo! Finance:	AUD CAD CHF CNY EUR GBP HKD JPY USD DKK NOK SEK
From XE.com:	AUD CAD CHF CNY EUR GBP HKD JPY USD DKK NOK SEK
From OANDA:	AUD CAD CHF CNY EUR GBP HKD JPY USD DKK NOK SEK

== See also ==
- Economy of Iceland
- Scandinavian Monetary Union
- Auroracoin

== References and sources ==
Sources

- Krause, Chester L.; Clifford Mishler (1991). Standard Catalog of World Coins: 1801–1991 (18th ed.). Krause Publications. ISBN 0873411501.
- Pick, Albert (1994). Bruce, Colin R. II; Shafer, Neil (eds.). Standard Catalog of World Paper Money: General Issues (7th ed.). Krause Publications. ISBN 0-87341-207-9.
