= List of elections in 1920 =

The following elections occurred in the year 1920.

- 1920 Histadrut election

== Africa ==
- 1920 South African general election
- 1920 Southern Rhodesian Legislative Council election

== Asia ==
- 1920 Hong Kong sanitary board election
- 1920 Turkish Grand National Assembly election
- 1920 Madras Presidency Legislative Council election
- 1920 Japanese general election

== Europe ==
- 1920 Estonian parliamentary election
- 1920 Free City of Danzig Constituent Assembly election
- 1920 German federal election
- 1920 Greek legislative election
- 1920 Irish local elections
- 1920 Austrian legislative election
- 1920 Bulgarian parliamentary election
- 1920 Danish constitutional referendum
- 1920 Greek referendum
- 1920 Faroese general election
- 1920 Hungarian parliamentary election
- 1920 Latvian Constitutional Assembly election
- 1920 Lithuanian parliamentary election
- 1920 Czechoslovak parliamentary election
- 1920 Czechoslovak presidential election
- 1920 Kingdom of Serbs, Croats and Slovenes Constitutional Assembly election
- 1920 Romanian general election
- 1920 San Marino general election
- 1920 Spanish general election
- 1920 Swedish general election
- 1920 Swiss referendums
- 1920 Turkish Grand National Assembly election
- East Prussian plebiscite

=== Denmark ===
- April 1920 Danish Folketing election
- July 1920 Danish Folketing election
- September 1920 Danish Folketing election
- August 1920 Danish Landsting election
- October 1920 Danish Landsting election

=== United Kingdom ===
- 1920 Argyll by-election
- 1920 Ashton-under-Lyne by-election
- 1920 Basingstoke by-election
- 1920 Dartford by-election
- 1920 Ebbw Vale by-election
- 1920 Edinburgh North by-election
- 1920 Edinburgh South by-election
- 1920 Hemel Hempstead by-election
- 1920 Horncastle by-election
- 1920 Ilford by-election
- 1920 Louth by-election
- 1920 Nelson and Colne by-election
- 1920 Northampton by-election
- 1920 Paisley by-election
- 1920 Rhondda West by-election
- 1920 South Norfolk by-election
- 1920 Stockport by-election
- 1920 Sunderland by-election
- 1920 Woodbridge by-election

== North America ==
=== Canada ===
- 1920 British Columbia general election
- 1920 Canadian liquor plebiscite
- 1920 Conservative Party of Ontario leadership election
- 1920 Edmonton municipal election
- 1920 Manitoba general election
- 1920 New Brunswick general election
- 1920 Nova Scotia general election
- 1920 Toronto municipal election
- 1920 Yukon general election

=== Caribbean ===
- 1920 Cuban general election

=== United States ===
- 1920 New York state election
- 1920 United States elections
- 1920 United States presidential election

==== United States lieutenant gubernatorial ====
- 1920 Connecticut lieutenant gubernatorial election
- 1920 Illinois lieutenant gubernatorial election
- 1920 Minnesota lieutenant gubernatorial election
- 1920 Missouri lieutenant gubernatorial election
- 1920 Nebraska lieutenant gubernatorial election
- 1920 Texas lieutenant gubernatorial election
- 1920 Wisconsin lieutenant gubernatorial election

==== United States gubernatorial ====
- 1920 Arizona gubernatorial election
- 1920 Arkansas gubernatorial election
- 1920 Colorado gubernatorial election
- 1920 Connecticut gubernatorial election
- 1920 Delaware gubernatorial election
- 1920 Florida gubernatorial election
- 1920 Georgia gubernatorial election
- 1920 Idaho gubernatorial election
- 1920 Illinois gubernatorial election
- 1920 Indiana gubernatorial election
- 1920 Iowa gubernatorial election
- 1920 Kansas gubernatorial election
- 1920 Louisiana gubernatorial election
- 1920 Maine gubernatorial election
- 1920 Massachusetts gubernatorial election
- 1920 Michigan gubernatorial election
- 1920 Minnesota gubernatorial election
- 1920 Missouri gubernatorial election
- 1920 Montana gubernatorial election
- 1920 Nebraska gubernatorial election
- 1920 New Hampshire gubernatorial election
- 1920 New Mexico gubernatorial election
- 1920 New York gubernatorial election
- 1920 North Carolina gubernatorial election
- 1920 North Dakota gubernatorial election
- 1920 Ohio gubernatorial election
- 1920 Rhode Island gubernatorial election
- 1920 South Carolina gubernatorial election
- 1920 South Dakota gubernatorial election
- 1920 Tennessee gubernatorial election
- 1920 Texas gubernatorial election
- 1920 United States gubernatorial elections
- 1920 Utah gubernatorial election
- 1920 Vermont gubernatorial election
- 1920 Washington gubernatorial election
- 1920 West Virginia gubernatorial election
- 1920 Wisconsin gubernatorial election

==== United States House of Representatives ====
- 1920 United States House of Representatives elections
- 1920 United States House of Representatives elections in California
- 1920 United States House of Representatives election in New Mexico
- 1920 United States House of Representatives elections in South Carolina

==== United States Senate ====
- 1920 United States Senate elections
- 1920 United States Senate election in Arizona
- 1920 United States Senate election in California
- 1920 United States Senate election in Colorado
- 1920 United States Senate election in Connecticut
- 1920 United States Senate election in Idaho
- 1920 United States Senate election in Illinois
- 1920 United States Senate election in Indiana
- 1920 United States Senate election in Iowa
- 1920 United States Senate election in Kansas
- 1920 United States Senate election in Kentucky
- 1920 United States Senate election in Louisiana
- 1920 United States Senate election in Maryland
- 1920 United States Senate election in Missouri
- 1920 United States Senate election in New Hampshire
- 1920 United States Senate election in New York
- 1920 United States Senate election in North Carolina
- 1920 United States Senate election in North Dakota
- 1920 United States Senate election in Ohio
- 1920 United States Senate election in Oklahoma
- 1920 United States Senate election in Pennsylvania
- 1920 United States Senate election in South Carolina
- 1920 United States Senate election in South Dakota
- 1920 United States Senate election in Vermont
- 1920 United States Senate special election in Virginia
- 1920 United States Senate election in Washington
- 1920 United States Senate election in Wisconsin

== South America ==
- 1920 Argentine legislative election
- 1920 Chilean presidential election
- 1920 Ecuadorian presidential election
- April 1920 Guatemalan presidential election
- August 1920 Guatemalan presidential election
- May 1920 Bolivian legislative election
- December 1920 Bolivian legislative election
- 1920 Nicaraguan general election
- 1920 Panamanian presidential election
- 1920 Uruguayan general election

== Oceania ==
=== Australia ===
- 1920 Ballaarat by-election
- 1920 Kalgoorlie by-election
- 1920 New South Wales state election
- 1920 Queensland state election
- 1920 Victorian state election

=== New Zealand ===
- 1920 Bruce by-election
- 1920 Stratford by-election

== See also ==
- Category:1920 elections
