= 1932 Wisconsin lieutenant gubernatorial election =

- November 8, 1932
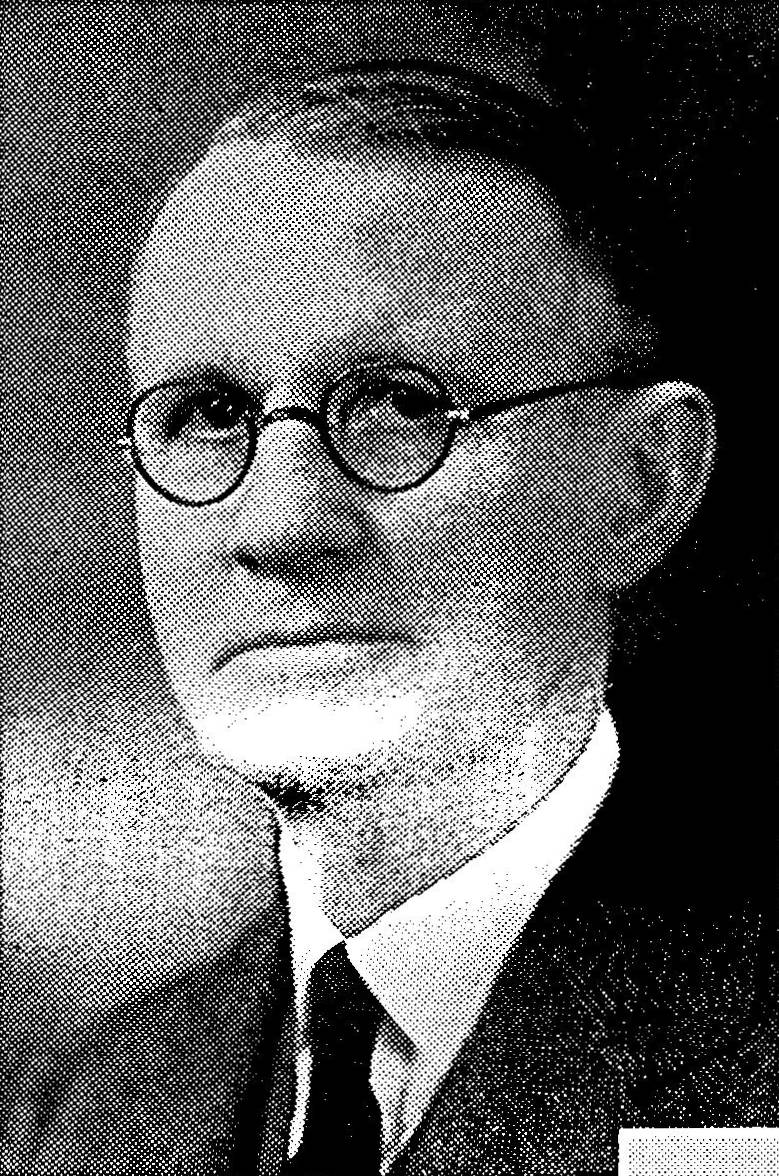

Nominee	Thomas J. O'Malley	Harry Dahl	William Coleman
Party	Democratic	Republican	Social-Democratic
Popular vote	544,294	450,966	63,380
Percentage	51.11%	42.34%	5.95%
Lieutenant Governor before election
Henry Huber
Republican
Elected Lieutenant Governor
Thomas J. O'Malley
Democratic

The 1932 Wisconsin lieutenant gubernatorial election was held on November 8, 1932, in order to elect the lieutenant governor of Wisconsin. Democratic nominee Thomas J. O'Malley defeated Republican nominee Harry Dahl, Social-Democratic nominee William Coleman and Prohibition nominee J. Keith Peckham. This election marked the end of a 19 consecutive winning streak for Wisconsin Republicans as they had won every lieutenant gubernatorial election since 1894. This election also marked the first time a Democrat was elected lieutenant governor of Wisconsin in the 20th century.

== Republican primary ==
The Republican primary election was held on September 20, 1932. Candidate Harry Dahl received a majority of the votes (56.74%) against incumbent four term lieutenant governor Henry Huber in a rematch of the previous primary, and was thus elected as the nominee for the general election.

=== Results ===
1932 Republican lieutenant gubernatorial primary
Party	Candidate	Votes	%
Republican	Harry Dahl	379,060	56.74%
Republican	Henry Huber (incumbent)	288,971	43.26%
Total votes		668,031	100.00%

== Democratic primary ==
The Democratic primary election was held on September 20, 1932. Candidate Thomas J. O'Malley received a majority of the votes (65.78%) against candidate Frank J. Grutza, and was thus elected as the nominee for the general election.

=== Results ===
1932 Democratic lieutenant gubernatorial primary
Party	Candidate	Votes	%
Democratic	Thomas J. O'Malley	80,661	65.78%
Democratic	Frank J. Grutza	41,957	34.22%
Total votes		122,618	100.00%

== General election ==
On election day, November 8, 1932, Democratic nominee Thomas J. O'Malley won the election by a margin of 93,328 votes against his foremost opponent Republican nominee Harry Dahl, thereby gaining Democratic control over the office of lieutenant governor. O'Malley was sworn in as the 26th lieutenant governor of Wisconsin on January 2, 1933.

=== Results ===
Wisconsin lieutenant gubernatorial election, 1932
Party	Candidate	Votes	%
Democratic	Thomas J. O'Malley	544,294	51.11
Republican	Harry Dahl	450,966	42.34
Social-Democratic	William Coleman	63,380	5.95
Prohibition	J. Keith Peckham	3,296	0.31
	Scattering	3,085	0.29
Total votes		1,065,021	100.00
Democratic gain from Republican			
