= 1920 Wisconsin lieutenant gubernatorial election =

- November 2, 1920
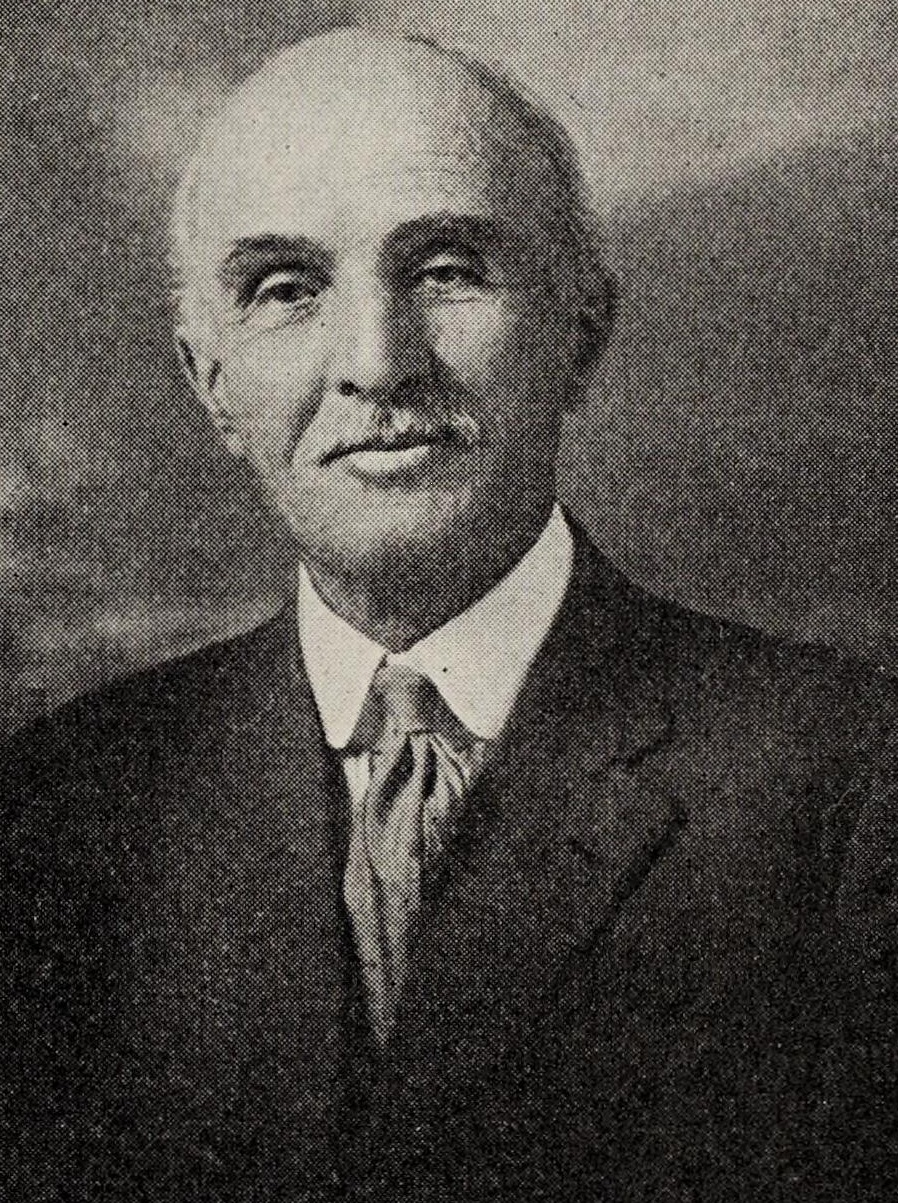

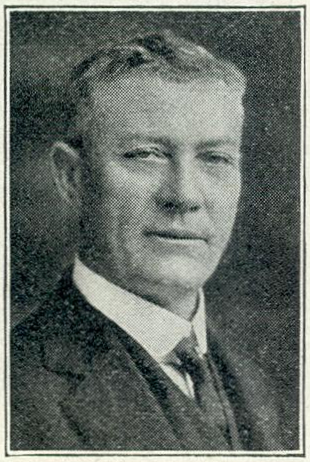

Nominee	George Comings	Henry Kleist	Frank R. Derrick
Party	Republican	Social-Democratic	Prohibition
Popular vote	440,839	75,457	55,940
Percentage	76.92%	13.17%	9.76%
Lieutenant Governor before election
Edward Dithmar
Republican
Elected Lieutenant Governor
George Comings
Republican

The 1920 Wisconsin lieutenant gubernatorial election was held on November 2, 1920, in order to elect the lieutenant governor of Wisconsin. Republican nominee George Comings defeated Social-Democratic nominee and incumbent member of the Wisconsin Senate Henry Kleist and Prohibition nominee Frank R. Derrick. This election marked the first time since the creation of the office of lieutenant governor that the Democratic party failed to run a candidate.

== Republican primary ==
The Republican primary election was held on September 7, 1920. Candidate George Comings received a plurality of the votes (45.91%) against incumbent state senator Albert J. Pullen and former state senator and candidate for lieutenant governor in the previous election Charles H. Everett, and was thus elected as the nominee for the general election.

=== Results ===
1920 Republican lieutenant gubernatorial primary
Party	Candidate	Votes	%
Republican	George Comings	152,052	45.91%
Republican	Albert J. Pullen	110,578	33.38%
Republican	Charles H. Everett	68,592	20.71%
Total votes		331,222	100.00%

== General election ==
On election day, November 2, 1920, Republican nominee George Comings won the election by a margin of 365,382 votes against his foremost opponent Social-Democratic nominee Henry Kleist, thereby retaining Republican control over the office of lieutenant governor. Comings was sworn in as the 24th lieutenant governor of Wisconsin on January 3, 1921.

=== Results ===
Wisconsin lieutenant gubernatorial election, 1920
Party	Candidate	Votes	%
Republican	George Comings	440,839	76.92
Social-Democratic	Henry Kleist	75,457	13.17
Prohibition	Frank R. Derrick	55,940	9.76
	Scattering	904	0.15
Total votes		573,140	100.00
Republican hold			
