= Northampton County Prison =

Prison in Easton, Pennsylvania, United States

Coordinates: 40.6882°N 75.2163°W

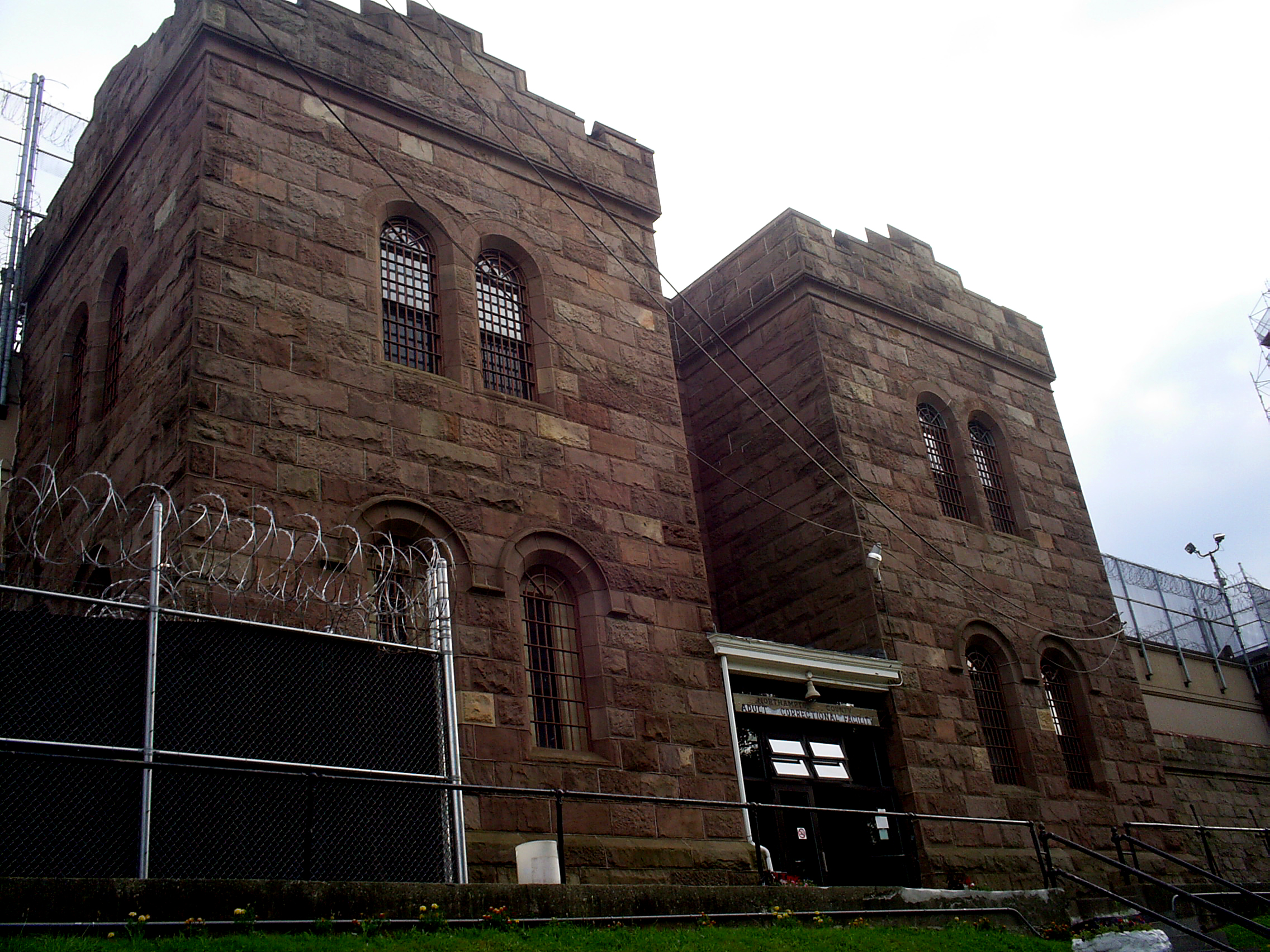
Northampton County Prison, 666 Walnut St. entrance.

Northampton County Prison is a county-level prison located in Easton, Pennsylvania in the United States.

The prison is situated adjacent to the Northampton County Courthouse and consists of four inter-connected buildings. It contains 15 separate housing units and a community corrections facility (work release) with a capacity of 913 inmates.

== History ==
The newly formed Northampton County built its first jailhouse in 1753. The building was located in Easton's Centre Square. The building was constructed from massive stone walls and served two purposes, to detain prisoners and to act as a safe house in the event of an attack from nearby Native American tribes.

In 1851 the jail was relocated to Sitgreaves Street. The new building contained 27 cells and was surrounded by 15-foot (4.6 m) high walls. In 1861 the Northampton County courthouse was built on its present site on Washington Street. The jail was too small at this time and offered an inconvenience in transporting prisoners to and from the courthouse.

In 1868 work began on a new prison adjacent to the courthouse. The building was completed in 1871 at a cost of $200,000. The building has undergone major renovation due to overcrowding. In 1909 an addition was completed and soon after a wall was erected to contain an outside recreation area to comply with state law. In 1993, two direct supervision units were added, soon followed by the freestanding Community Corrections Facility. In 2004, the Northampton County Council approved a $22.8 million expansion. The new expansion was completed in 2006 and consisted of two towers with three "podular"/direct supervision units, a new intake unit, and connection of the buildings.
