= 1930 Texas gubernatorial election =

- November 4, 1930
- Turnout: 24.6% ▼27.0%

Nominee	Ross S. Sterling	William E. Talbot
Party	Democratic	Republican
Popular vote	252,738	62,224
Percentage	79.98%	19.69%
- County results Sterling: 50–60% 60–70% 70–80% 80–90% >90% Talbot: 60–70% No votes
Governor before election
Dan Moody
Democratic
Elected Governor
Ross S. Sterling
Democratic

The 1930 Texas gubernatorial election was held on November 4, 1930, to elect the governor of Texas. Democratic nominee Ross S. Sterling defeated Republican nominee William E. Talbot.

== Democratic primary ==
The Democratic primary election was held on July 26, 1930. As no candidate won a majority of votes, there was a run-off on August 23, 1930, between the two highest ranking candidates, former Governor of Texas Miriam A. Ferguson and Ross S. Sterling. Sterling eventually won the primary with 55.19% against Ferguson.

=== Results ===
Candidate	First round		Run-off	
Candidate	Votes	%	Votes	%
Ross S. Sterling	170,754	20.49	473,371	55.19
Miriam A. Ferguson	242,959	29.15	384,402	44.81
Clint C. Small	138,934	16.67		
Thomas B. Love	87,068	10.45		
James Young	73,385	8.81		
Barry Miller	54,652	6.56		
Earle Bradford Mayfield	54,459	6.53		
C. C. Moody	4,382	0.53		
Paul Loven	2,724	0.33		
Frank Putnam	2,365	0.28		
C. E. Walker	1,760	0.21		
Total	833,442	100.00	857,773	100.00

== Republican primary ==
The Republican primary election was also held on July 26, 1930. It was only the second Republican primary in state history, coming off of W. H. Holmes' run for governor in 1928, which garnered over 120,000 votes. George Butte, the Republican nominee in 1924, won the party's primary in absentia, but doubts remained as to whether Butte, who was a special assistant to the attorney general in Washington, D.C. at the time, would accept the nomination.

After being nominated by the state convention in San Angelo, Butte wrote a letter to the executive committee resigning as nominee, explaining that he had tried to resign prior to the convention, but his resignation had not been accepted. The committee nominated William E. Talbot on September 24, but he was not certified as the nominee until September 27, because of Butte's delayed resignation. Talbot, a colonel in World War One and sales manager at Southland Life Insurance, advocated for an old age pension, state development of river navigation, protection of independent oil producers, and prioritization of small trucks over large ones to protect the state's new highways.

=== Results ===
Candidate	Votes	%
George Butte (Note: George Butte did not accept the party nomination, and William E. Talbot was nominated in his place.)	5,001	51.15
H.E. Exum	2,773	28.36
John F. Grant	1,800	18.41
John P. Gaines	203	2.08
Total	9,777	100.00

== General election ==
The Socialist Party nominated Lee Lightfoot Rhodes for a second consecutive time (and fourth time overall), as did the Communist Party with their nominee J. Stedham, after their shared election loss in the 1928 Texas gubernatorial election. On election day, November 4, 1930, Democratic nominee Ross S. Sterling won the election by a margin of 190,514 votes against his foremost opponent, Republican nominee William E. Talbot, thereby retaining Democratic control over the office of governor. Sterling was sworn in as the 31st governor of Texas on January 20, 1931.

=== Results ===
Texas gubernatorial election, 1930
Party	Candidate	Votes	%
Democratic	Ross S. Sterling	252,738	79.98
Republican	William E. Talbot	62,224	19.69
Socialist	Lee Lightfoot Rhodes	829	0.26
Communist	J. Stedham	231	0.07
Total votes		316,022	100.00
Democratic hold			
