= Lee Lightfoot Rhodes =

American politician

Member of the Texas House of Representatives from the 100th district
- In office January 8, 1895 – January 12, 1897
- Preceded by: John Thomas Currey
- Succeeded by: John Thomas Currey

Personal details
- Born: March 6, 1864 Panola County, Mississippi, C.S.A.
- Died: December 17, 1936 (aged 71) Van Zandt County, Texas, U.S.
- Party: Socialist
- Other political affiliations: Union Labor (1888 - 1891); Populist (1891-?); Progressive (1924); Democratic (1932-1936)
- Spouse: Jennie Presley
- Children: 5

Lee Lightfoot Rhodes (March 6, 1864 – December 17, 1936) was an American politician who was influential in the Texas state Socialist Party from its inception until his death in 1936, he served in the Texas House of Representatives from 1895 to 1897 as a Populist.

== Early life ==
Rhodes was born on March 6, 1864, in Panola County, Mississippi, the son of John C. H. Rhodes and J. A. F. Rhodes, he was one of eight children. His family migrated to Van Zandt County, Texas in the early 1870s, where he married Jennie Presley and fathered four daughters and a son.

== Early political career ==
Rhodes political career began in the late 1880s when he joined the Union Labor Party and attended the first of many conventions which aimed to create the Texas State Federation of Labor, where he served on the executive committee. Rhodes first sought elective office in 1890, when he ran a failed campaign for state senator under the Union Labor Party for District 7 of the Texas Senate which included his home county of Van Zandt. Despite being endorsed by the local Republican Party, Rhodes lost this election handily, and this marked the beginning of his lifelong opposition to the two party system, especially the Democratic Party.

In 1891 Rhodes joined the Populist Party, he stated that the Democrats and Republicans could not represent the will of the people and claimed that the Democratic Party “locates the head of its national ticket in Wall Street and the tail in the west” and the Republican Party “puts [their] head in the west and [their] tail in Wall street.” He became an active member of the party, and attended the 1892 national convention as a delegate.

In 1894 Rhodes defeated incumbent John T. Currey by a margin of 2,022 votes to 1,349 to become the state representative for the 100th district, which consisted of Van Zandt County. In the twenty-fourth legislature he served on four committees: Agricultural Affairs, Mining and Minerals, and Private Land Claims. He also proposed four bills during his term, but like many Populist efforts in the state legislature, none of the bills were passed. Rhodes’s time as legislator defined his ideology as an advocate of farmers and laborers. In 1896 he was defeated for re-election by John T. Currey (the man he had beaten two years earlier) and withdrew from the political scene for the remainder of the 1890s.

== Socialist politician ==
At the turn of the century, as the Populist Party began to disintegrate, he joined many former Populists and his brother Jake in the newly formed Social Democratic Party (later renamed the Socialist Party of America). His experience, likeability, and wit served him well and earned him the respect of his colleagues. During this time he also became heavily involved in the Texas Farmers Union and organized new chapters across the state giving stump speeches for the party, which included guests like Eugene V. Debs and attended the Socialist national convention. However, with the onset of World War I he stepped away from the politics as the parties anti-war stances were widely unpopular.

In 1920 he returned to the scene as the Socialist candidate for lieutenant governor, but he was elevated to nominee for governor when the previous nominee dropped out before election day. After losing the election, the statewide Socialist Party did not run another ticket until 1926. During this time Rhodes briefly jumped ship and joined the Progressive Party to serve as an elector for Robert M. La Follette. After the election he joined a failed attempt to form a "Texas Labor Party" in 1926 before returning to the Socialist Party in 1928. In 1928 and 1930 Rhodes was the gubernatorial candidate for the Socialist Party but posted historically bad returns even for the Socialist Party (787 and 829 votes statewide respectively). In 1932 Rhodes, spurred on by the pro-union and New Deal policies of F.D.R. joined the Democratic Party in order to run in the Democratic primary for state representative from Van Zandt county once again, but failed to win the nomination.

== Death ==
Lee Rhodes died on December 17, 1936, of an acute intestinal blockage at the age of 71.

Party political offices
Preceded by -	Socialist nominee for Governor of Texas; 1920, 1928, 1930	Succeeded by -
Political offices
Texas House of Representatives
Preceded by John T. Currey	Member of the Texas House of Representatives from District 100 (Van Zandt County); 1895–1897	Succeeded by John T. Currey
