= December 1920 Bolivian legislative election =

Parliamentary elections were held in Bolivia in December 1920 to elect a new National Congress. They followed the coup d'état that prevented the Congress elected in May 1920 from taking office.

== Results ==
Party	Seats	
Party	Chamber	Senate
Republican Party	60	16
Socialist Party	3	0
Total	63	16
Source: Cáceres

=== Elected Senators ===
- Antonio L. Velasco, PR (Béni)
- Maximiano Arce, PR (Béni)
- Domingo L. Ramírez, PR (Chuquisaca)
- Román Paz, PR (Chuquisaca)
- José Q. Mdendoza, PR (Cochabamba)
- Carlos Salamanca, PR (Cochabamba)
- Francisco Iraizós, PR (La Paz)
- Abel Iturralde, PR (La Paz)
- León M. Loza, PR (Oruro)
- Daniel Salamanca, PR (Oruro)
- José Paravicini, PR (Potosi)
- Severo Fernández Alonso, PR (Potosí)
- Ignacio Justiniano, PR (Santa Cruz)
- Pablo E. Roca, PR (Santa Cruz)
- Julio Lema, PR (Tarija)
- José R. Estenssoro, PR (Tarija)

== Aftermath ==
On 24 January 1921 the National Congress elected Bautista Saavedra President of the Republic. On 31 January Congress elected Luis Paz Vice-President.

Presidential election
Candidate	Party	Votes	%
Bautista Saavedra	Republican Party	47	97.92
Daniel Salamanca Urey	Republican Party	1	2.08
Total		48	100.00
Total votes		48	–
Registered voters/turnout		79	60.76

Vice-Presidential election
Candidate	Party	Votes	%
Luis Paz	Republican Party	41	74.55
José Q. Mendoza	Republican Party	12	21.82
José Manuel Ramírez	Republican Party	1	1.82
Román Paz	Republican Party	1	1.82
Total		55	100.00
Valid votes		55	82.09
Invalid/blank votes		12	17.91
Total votes		67	100.00
Registered voters/turnout		79	84.81
