= Evergreen, Allegheny County, Pennsylvania =

Unincorporated community in Pennsylvania, US

Evergreen, Pennsylvania
- Unincorporated community
- Location within Pennsylvania
- Coordinates: 40°30′22″N 79°59′26″W
- Country: United States
- State: Pennsylvania
- County: Allegheny
- Township: Ross
- Elevation: 863 ft (263 m)
- Time zone: UTC-5 (Eastern (EST))
  - Summer (DST): UTC-4 (EDT)
- Area code: 412
- GNIS feature ID: 1174359

Evergreen is an unincorporated community in Ross Township, Allegheny County, Pennsylvania, United States.

== Notable person ==
- Henry Huber, Wisconsin politician
