= 1930 Wisconsin lieutenant gubernatorial election =

- November 4, 1930
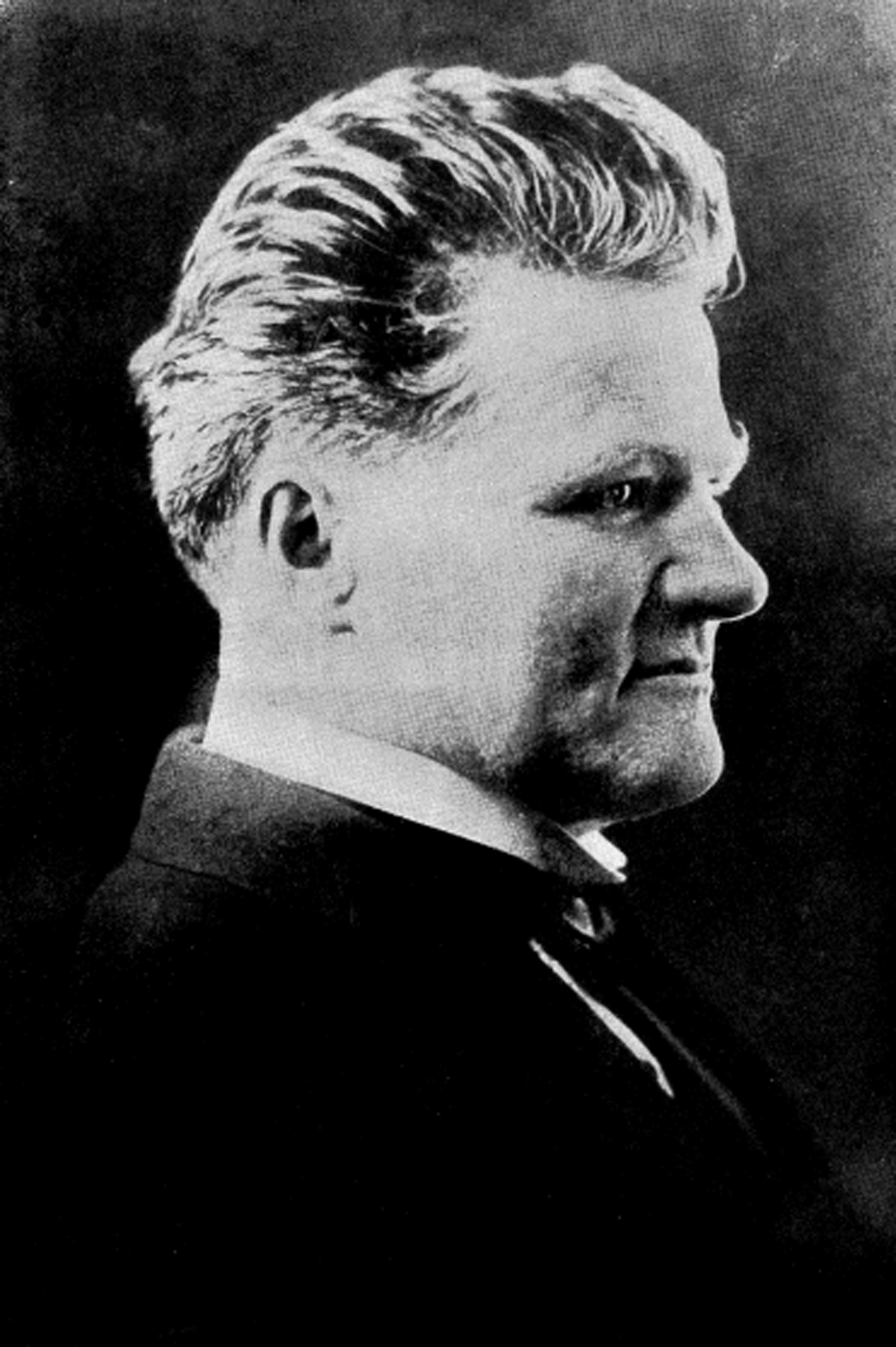

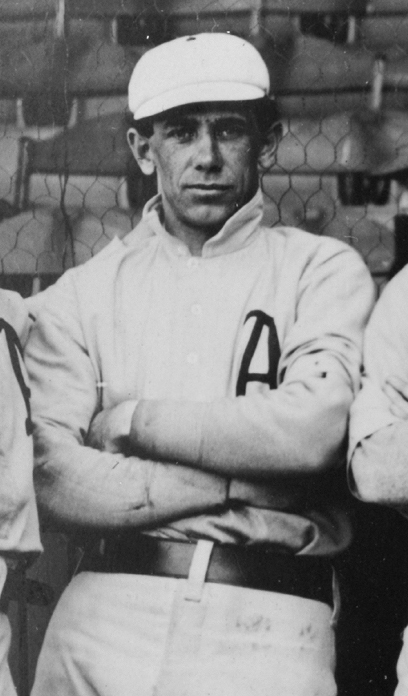

Nominee	Henry Huber	Bert Husting	John R. Severin
Party	Republican	Democratic	Social-Democratic
Popular vote	370,075	141,632	32,107
Percentage	66.03%	25.27%	5.73%
Lieutenant Governor before election
Henry Huber
Republican
Elected Lieutenant Governor
Henry Huber
Republican

The 1930 Wisconsin lieutenant gubernatorial election was held on November 4, 1930, in order to elect the lieutenant governor of Wisconsin. Incumbent Republican lieutenant governor Henry Huber defeated Democratic nominee and baseball pitcher Bert Husting, Social-Democratic nominee John R. Severin, Prohibition nominee Otto D. Kahl and Independent Communist nominee William Clark. This election marked the first time in the state's history a lieutenant governor was elected to a fourth term.

== Republican primary ==
The Republican primary election was held on September 16, 1930. Incumbent lieutenant governor Henry Huber received a majority of the votes (54.87%) against candidate Harry Dahl, and was thus elected as the nominee for the general election.

=== Results ===
1930 Republican lieutenant gubernatorial primary
Party	Candidate	Votes	%
Republican	Henry Huber (incumbent)	318,225	54.87%
Republican	Harry Dahl	261,722	45.13%
Total votes		579,947	100.00%

== General election ==
On election day, November 4, 1930, incumbent Republican lieutenant governor Henry Huber won re-election by a margin of 228,443 votes against his foremost opponent Democratic nominee Bert Husting, thereby retaining Republican control over the office of lieutenant governor. Huber was sworn in for his fourth term on January 5, 1931.

=== Results ===
Wisconsin lieutenant gubernatorial election, 1930
Party	Candidate	Votes	%
Republican	Henry Huber (incumbent)	370,075	66.03
Democratic	Bert Husting	141,632	25.27
Social-Democratic	John R. Severin	32,107	5.73
Prohibition	Otto D. Kahl	13,404	2.39
Communist (Note: "Independent Communist")	William Clark	3,155	0.56
	Scattering	61	0.02
Total votes		560,434	100.00
Republican hold			
