= 1920 Texas lieutenant gubernatorial election =

- November 2, 1920
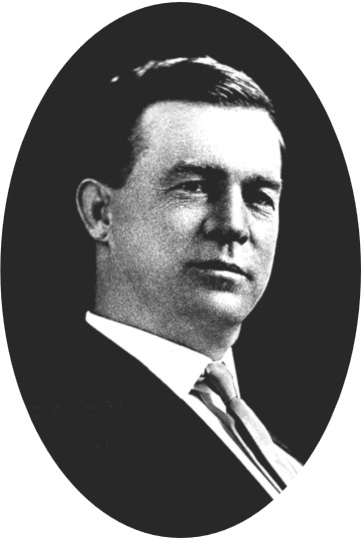

Nominee	Lynch Davidson	H. W. Smith
Party	Democratic	Republican
Popular vote	302,590	87,916
Percentage	62.66%	18.21%
Nominee	J. W. Green	S. E. Starn
Party	American	Black-and-Tan Republican
Popular vote	58,830	26,404
Percentage	12.18%	5.47%
Lieutenant Governor before election
Willard Arnold Johnson
Democratic
Elected Lieutenant Governor
Lynch Davidson
Democratic

The 1920 Texas lieutenant gubernatorial election was held on November 2, 1920, in order to elect the lieutenant governor of Texas. Democratic nominee Lynch Davidson defeated Republican nominee H. W. Smith, American nominee J. W. Green, Black-and-Tan Republican nominee S. E. Starn and Socialist nominee W. H. Wilson.

== General election ==
On election day, November 2, 1920, Democratic nominee Lynch Davidson won the election by a margin of 214,674 votes against his foremost opponent Republican nominee H. W. Smith, thereby retaining Democratic control over the office of lieutenant governor. Davidson was sworn in as the 26th lieutenant governor of Texas on January 18, 1921.

=== Results ===
Texas lieutenant gubernatorial election, 1920
Party	Candidate	Votes	%
Democratic	Lynch Davidson	302,590	62.66
Republican	H. W. Smith	87,916	18.21
American	J. W. Green	58,830	12.18
Black and Tan Republican	S. E. Starn	26,404	5.47
Socialist	W. H. Wilson	7,144	1.48
Total votes		482,884	100.00
Democratic hold			
