= 1920 United States presidential election in Texas =

- November 2, 1920

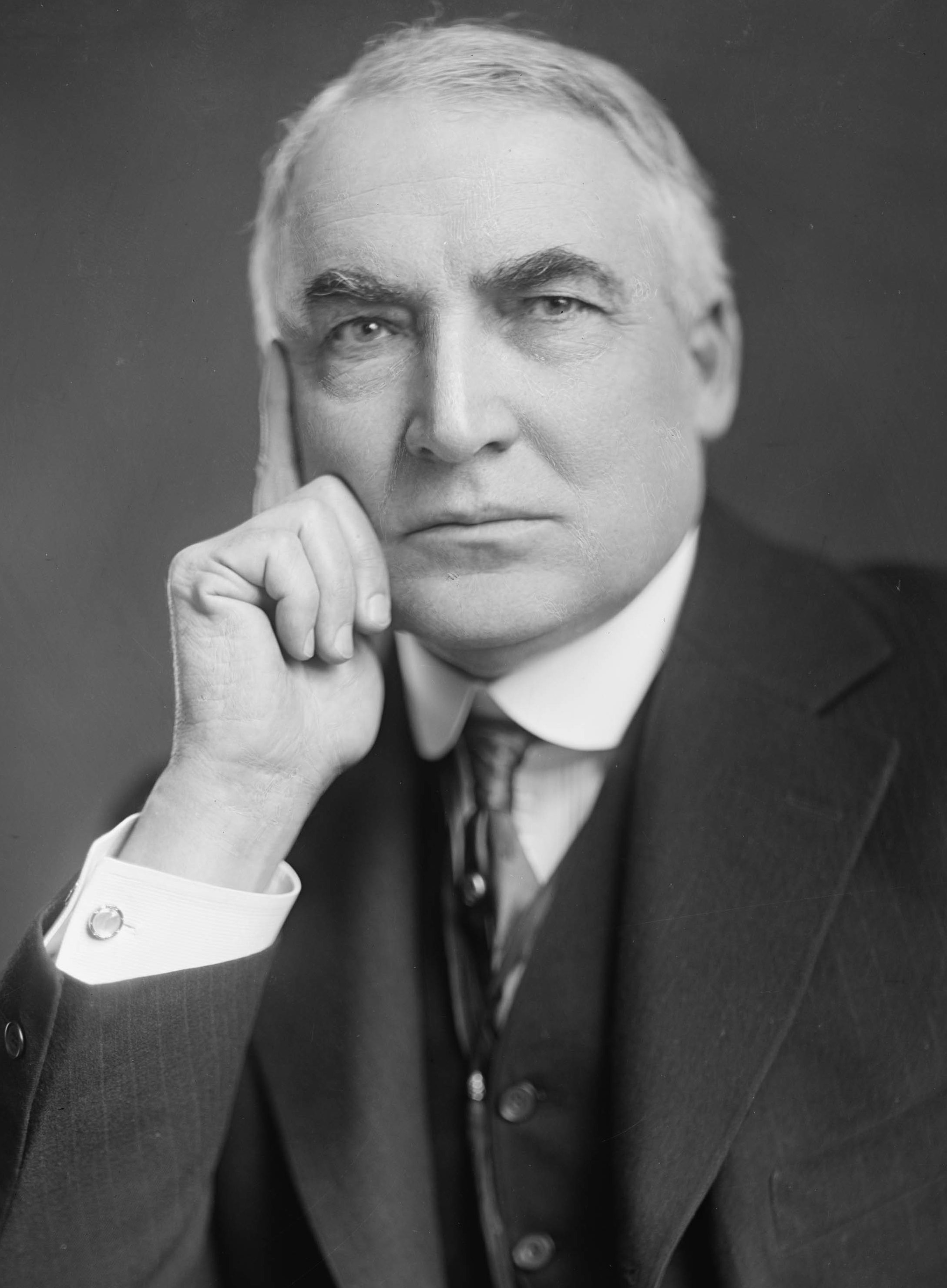

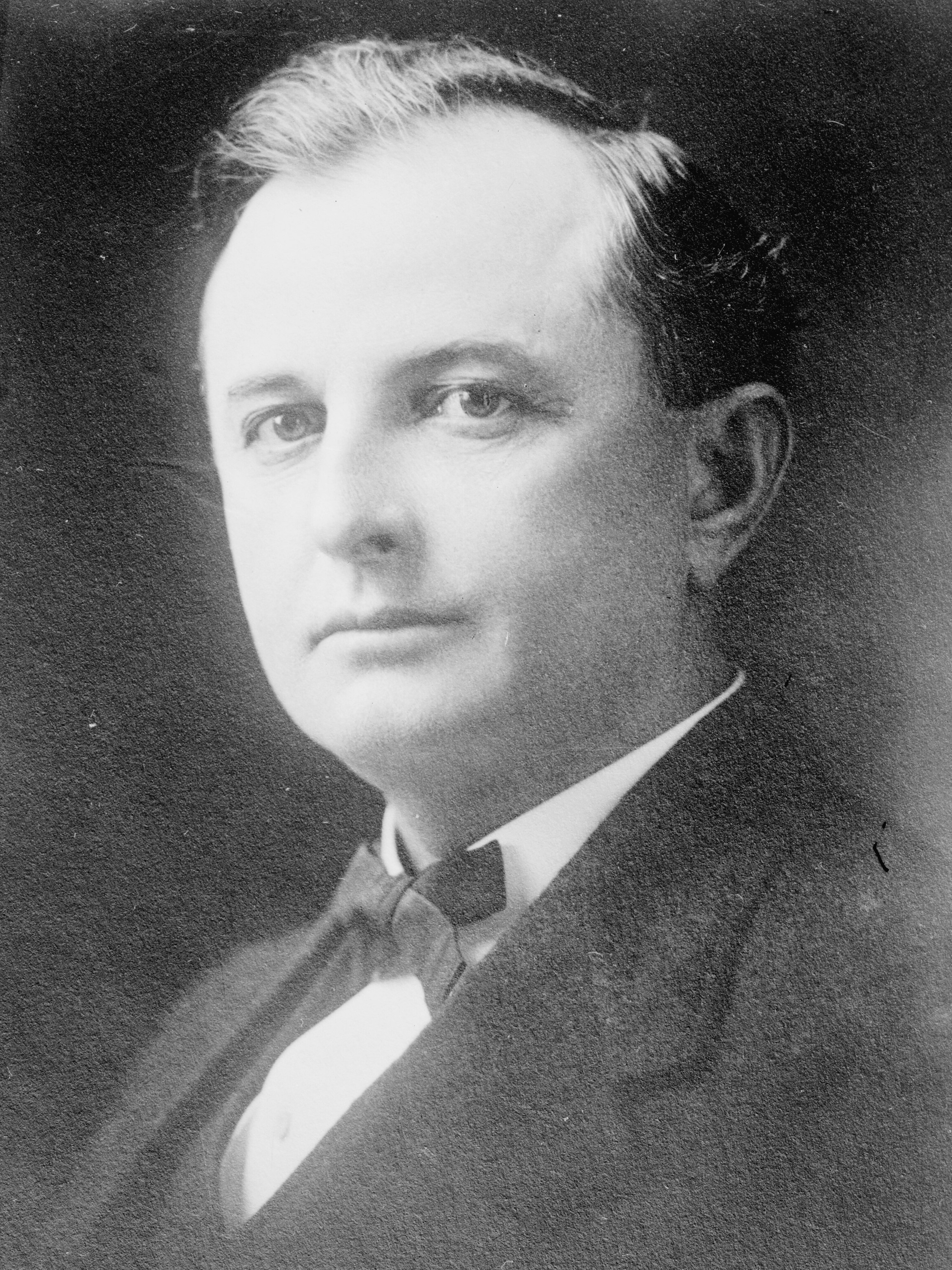

Nominee	James M. Cox	Warren G. Harding
Party	Democratic	Republican
Home state	Ohio	Ohio
Running mate	Franklin D. Roosevelt	Calvin Coolidge
Electoral vote	20	0
Popular vote	288,767	114,538
Percentage	59.34%	23.54%
Nominee	James E. Ferguson	None
Party	American	Black-and-Tan Republican
Home state	Texas
Running mate	William Hough	None
Electoral vote	0	0
Popular vote	47,968	27,247
Percentage	9.86%	5.60%
County results
Cox
30–40%
40–50%
50–60%
60–70%
70–80%
80–90%
90–100%
Harding
30–40%
40–50%
50–60%
60–70%
70–80%
Ferguson
30–40%
40–50%
50–60%

The 1920 presidential election in Texas was part of the 1920 United States presidential election in which all contemporary forty-eight states voted on November 2, 1920. State voters chose 20 electors, or representatives to the Electoral College, who voted for president and vice president.

== Background ==
Ever since statehood, Texas had been very nearly the strongest state for the Democratic Party owing to its initial history being as a Deep South state with an economy based on slavery. Even during Reconstruction when African-Americans were briefly enfranchised, the Republican Party won just one statewide election, and after Redemption and the passing of a new constitution in 1876 the GOP became confined largely to areas of abolitionist German refugee settlement in the Hill Country, and to a few South Texas counties where local Republican bosses could outcompete their Democratic equivalents. The Terrell Election Law created a poll tax that, from 1902, disenfranchised virtually all remaining African-American voters, the vast majority of Mexican Americans, and most poor whites. Voter turnout among males over twenty-one fell from over eighty percent to under thirty percent following the poll tax.

The period following this disfranchisement nonetheless saw a considerable amount of typically "Progressive" reform under Governors James Stephen Hogg and Thomas M. Campbell, and despite this progressive faction ceding power in 1906 to the conservatives, Texas proved solid in its support for progressive candidate Woodrow Wilson at the 1912 Democratic National Convention. Another populist, James Ferguson, took the governorship in 1914 on an anti-Prohibition platform, but was impeached for misappropriation of public funds. Nonetheless, this impeachment actually spurred him to run in the ensuing presidential election, although despite attempting to do so he did not obtain ballot access in any of the other forty-seven states.

In the 1916 presidential election, Democrat Woodrow Wilson had established firmer control over the machine-dominated areas of South Texas, but hostility towards Wilson's peace promises caused some losses amongst the German population, where Lee County went Republican for the first time. By the time the 1920 presidential election season was to begin, German and Irish Americans hated President Wilson for his entry into the war and his role in drafting the Treaty of Versailles and supporting many anti-German groups during the "Red Scare". His League of Nations proposal was also opposed in the South where isolationism had long been very powerful.

Despite the hostility towards Wilson and James M. Cox, the latter of whom had banned German-language instruction in public schools as Governor of Ohio, amongst German-Americans and some isolationists, Texas was too solidly Democratic for there to be any threat from even the largest popular-vote landslide in United States presidential election history. Although Cox's performance was the worst by a Democrat since the complete disfranchisement of Texas' black population by the 1902 poll tax, losses from hostility to Wilsonian foreign policy were much less pronounced than in French Louisiana or the Ozarks.

== American party ==
Favorite son James E. Ferguson, running on the "American" ticket but not on the ballot in a single other state, gained considerable support amongst those tenants and small-scale owners in East and Central Texas who could pay the poll tax, but these were few enough that he did not crack double figures for the state as a whole, and his presence cut into support for imprisoned Socialist Eugene V. Debs. Though Ferguson was unsuccessful in the presidential election, the American Party did elect four members to the Texas House of Representatives: Walter J. Kveton of Sealy, Otto F. Menking of Fayetteville, Henry Julius Neinast of Burton, and John Henry Wessels of La Grange.

== Results ==
This would be the last occasion that Zapata County would vote for a Republican presidential candidate until the 2020 election, as it would become the last South Texas machine county to be turned over to Democratic control.

1920 United States presidential election in Texas
Party	Candidate	Votes	Percentage	Electoral votes
Democratic	James M. Cox	288,767	59.34%	20
Republican	Warren G. Harding	114,538	23.54%	0
American	James E. Ferguson	47,968	9.86%	0
Black and Tan Republican	No Candidate	27,247	5.60%	0
Socialist	Eugene V. Debs	8,121	1.67%	0
Totals		486,824	100.00%	20
Voter turnout (voting age)				—

=== Results by county ===
County	James M. Cox Democratic		Warren G. Harding Republican		James E. Ferguson American		No candidate Black and Tan Republican		Eugene V. Debs Socialist		Total votes cast
County	#	%	#	%	#	%	#	%	#	%	Total votes cast
Anderson	2,355	59.98%	323	8.23%	267	6.80%	906	23.08%	75	1.91%	3,926
Andrews	74	89.16%	9	10.84%	0	0.00%	0	0.00%	0	0.00%	83
Angelina	1,661	62.16%	205	7.67%	589	22.04%	119	4.45%	98	3.67%	2,672
Aransas	146	74.87%	49	25.13%	0	0.00%	0	0.00%	0	0.00%	195
Archer	449	69.61%	169	26.20%	20	3.10%	0	0.00%	7	1.09%	645
Armstrong	405	81.49%	87	17.51%	1	0.20%	1	0.20%	3	0.60%	497
Atascosa	531	69.23%	185	24.12%	32	4.17%	7	0.91%	12	1.56%	767
Austin	538	18.62%	568	19.65%	1,682	58.20%	87	3.01%	15	0.52%	2,890
Bandera	311	50.90%	249	40.75%	33	5.40%	0	0.00%	18	2.95%	611
Bastrop	1,088	50.23%	484	22.35%	441	20.36%	147	6.79%	6	0.28%	2,166
Baylor	632	73.57%	139	16.18%	61	7.10%	0	0.00%	27	3.14%	859
Bee	545	59.05%	283	30.66%	77	8.34%	0	0.00%	18	1.95%	923
Bell	3,595	59.12%	483	7.94%	1,759	28.93%	168	2.76%	76	1.25%	6,081
Bexar	6,926	40.63%	8,894	52.18%	498	2.92%	557	3.27%	171	1.00%	17,046
Blanco	426	24.94%	378	22.13%	886	51.87%	14	0.82%	4	0.23%	1,708
Borden	89	84.76%	4	3.81%	11	10.48%	0	0.00%	1	0.95%	105
Bosque	1,556	61.16%	567	22.29%	364	14.31%	28	1.10%	29	1.14%	2,544
Bowie	2,396	62.22%	1,032	26.80%	31	0.80%	254	6.60%	138	3.58%	3,851
Brazoria	1,184	45.45%	1,235	47.41%	110	4.22%	25	0.96%	51	1.96%	2,605
Brazos	1,281	58.98%	277	12.75%	107	4.93%	502	23.11%	5	0.23%	2,172
Brewster	210	60.52%	125	36.02%	8	2.31%	0	0.00%	4	1.15%	347
Briscoe	262	78.92%	39	11.75%	22	6.63%	0	0.00%	9	2.71%	332
Brooks	127	77.44%	37	22.56%	0	0.00%	0	0.00%	0	0.00%	164
Brown	1,708	70.11%	397	16.30%	289	11.86%	14	0.57%	28	1.15%	2,436
Burleson	981	49.35%	141	7.09%	405	20.37%	459	23.09%	2	0.10%	1,988
Burnet	795	62.60%	241	18.98%	225	17.72%	0	0.00%	9	0.71%	1,270
Caldwell	1,240	59.99%	269	13.01%	336	16.26%	218	10.55%	4	0.19%	2,067
Calhoun	363	64.71%	95	16.93%	36	6.42%	34	6.06%	33	5.88%	561
Callahan	804	66.78%	213	17.69%	153	12.71%	0	0.00%	34	2.82%	1,204
Cameron	920	49.84%	909	49.24%	4	0.22%	1	0.05%	12	0.65%	1,846
Camp	661	50.04%	156	11.81%	58	4.39%	442	33.46%	4	0.30%	1,321
Carson	428	66.15%	208	32.15%	3	0.46%	0	0.00%	8	1.24%	647
Cass	1,563	46.01%	1,446	42.57%	151	4.45%	184	5.42%	53	1.56%	3,397
Castro	158	56.03%	118	41.84%	3	1.06%	0	0.00%	3	1.06%	282
Chambers	240	42.63%	278	49.38%	30	5.33%	2	0.36%	13	2.31%	563
Cherokee	2,233	62.51%	478	13.38%	525	14.70%	260	7.28%	76	2.13%	3,572
Childress	1,206	83.98%	158	11.00%	27	1.88%	1	0.07%	44	3.06%	1,436
Clay	1,324	72.71%	446	24.49%	34	1.87%	3	0.16%	14	0.77%	1,821
Coke	444	78.58%	59	10.44%	39	6.90%	0	0.00%	23	4.07%	565
Coleman	1,445	65.27%	355	16.03%	334	15.09%	4	0.18%	76	3.43%	2,214
Collin	4,045	70.01%	1,338	23.16%	261	4.52%	31	0.54%	103	1.78%	5,778
Collingsworth	640	63.56%	307	30.49%	8	0.79%	1	0.10%	51	5.06%	1,007
Colorado	765	30.91%	477	19.27%	822	33.21%	346	13.98%	65	2.63%	2,475
Comal	181	9.95%	765	42.03%	841	46.21%	2	0.11%	31	1.70%	1,820
Comanche	1,633	57.10%	930	32.52%	197	6.89%	0	0.00%	100	3.50%	2,860
Concho	405	60.00%	151	22.37%	100	14.81%	1	0.15%	18	2.67%	675
Cooke	2,170	64.05%	1,003	29.60%	60	1.77%	89	2.63%	66	1.95%	3,388
Coryell	1,542	56.65%	444	16.31%	714	26.23%	8	0.29%	14	0.51%	2,722
Cottle	472	71.08%	121	18.22%	9	1.36%	2	0.30%	60	9.04%	664
Crockett	89	52.05%	80	46.78%	1	0.58%	0	0.00%	1	0.58%	171
Crosby	572	73.15%	146	18.67%	29	3.71%	2	0.26%	33	4.22%	782
Culberson	40	85.11%	6	12.77%	1	2.13%	0	0.00%	0	0.00%	47
Dallam	478	64.95%	195	26.49%	23	3.13%	0	0.00%	40	5.43%	736
Dallas	14,390	67.41%	4,984	23.35%	200	0.94%	1,638	7.67%	135	0.63%	21,347
Dawson	296	70.64%	75	17.90%	23	5.49%	0	0.00%	25	5.97%	419
Deaf Smith	459	68.92%	205	30.78%	0	0.00%	0	0.00%	2	0.30%	666
Delta	1,081	72.16%	315	21.03%	29	1.94%	50	3.34%	23	1.54%	1,498
Denton	1,257	48.35%	900	34.62%	302	11.62%	82	3.15%	59	2.27%	2,600
Dewitt	971	29.34%	1,277	38.59%	647	19.55%	394	11.91%	20	0.60%	3,309
Dickens	433	74.78%	109	18.83%	8	1.38%	0	0.00%	29	5.01%	579
Dimmit	231	67.35%	108	31.49%	1	0.29%	0	0.00%	3	0.87%	343
Donley	766	76.52%	206	20.58%	1	0.10%	0	0.00%	28	2.80%	1,001
Duval	1,081	92.08%	86	7.33%	1	0.09%	0	0.00%	6	0.51%	1,174
Eastland	2,942	72.30%	941	23.13%	92	2.26%	0	0.00%	94	2.31%	4,069
Ector	100	80.00%	23	18.40%	2	1.60%	0	0.00%	0	0.00%	125
Edwards	201	38.00%	297	56.14%	17	3.21%	0	0.00%	14	2.65%	529
El Paso	4,143	50.00%	4,070	49.12%	10	0.12%	8	0.10%	55	0.66%	8,286
Ellis	4,081	69.68%	819	13.98%	621	10.60%	321	5.48%	15	0.26%	5,857
Erath	1,914	69.78%	358	13.05%	384	14.00%	15	0.55%	72	2.62%	2,743
Falls	1,878	48.36%	585	15.07%	635	16.35%	731	18.83%	54	1.39%	3,883
Fannin	3,461	66.79%	1,103	21.29%	183	3.53%	319	6.16%	116	2.24%	5,182
Fayette	932	20.59%	1,101	24.32%	2,128	47.01%	356	7.86%	10	0.22%	4,527
Fisher	743	74.75%	152	15.29%	30	3.02%	1	0.10%	68	6.84%	994
Floyd	841	78.89%	167	15.67%	17	1.59%	1	0.09%	40	3.75%	1,066
Foard	491	78.06%	101	16.06%	1	0.16%	0	0.00%	36	5.72%	629
Fort Bend	27	2.91%	0	0.00%	514	55.33%	388	41.77%	0	0.00%	929
Freestone	1,463	53.16%	378	13.74%	254	9.23%	630	22.89%	27	0.98%	2,752
Frio	421	79.14%	102	19.17%	2	0.38%	2	0.38%	5	0.94%	532
Gaines	134	93.71%	9	6.29%	0	0.00%	0	0.00%	0	0.00%	143
Galveston	2,933	54.63%	1,625	30.27%	645	12.01%	108	2.01%	58	1.08%	5,369
Garza	392	82.88%	28	5.92%	42	8.88%	0	0.00%	11	2.33%	473
Gillespie	137	6.51%	1,270	60.36%	681	32.37%	0	0.00%	16	0.76%	2,104
Glasscock	91	77.78%	25	21.37%	1	0.85%	0	0.00%	0	0.00%	117
Goliad	448	38.52%	513	44.11%	114	9.80%	66	5.67%	22	1.89%	1,163
Gonzales	1,299	52.29%	748	30.11%	256	10.31%	167	6.72%	14	0.56%	2,484
Gray	529	65.23%	251	30.95%	7	0.86%	0	0.00%	24	2.96%	811
Grayson	5,241	65.97%	2,125	26.75%	103	1.30%	351	4.42%	125	1.57%	7,945
Gregg	1,050	68.99%	257	16.89%	29	1.91%	177	11.63%	9	0.59%	1,522
Grimes	1,027	70.88%	214	14.77%	200	13.80%	4	0.28%	4	0.28%	1,449
Guadalupe	560	17.33%	1,839	56.90%	760	23.51%	69	2.13%	4	0.12%	3,232
Hale	1,279	76.18%	352	20.96%	20	1.19%	0	0.00%	28	1.67%	1,679
Hall	922	76.58%	194	16.11%	33	2.74%	1	0.08%	54	4.49%	1,204
Hamilton	1,075	64.29%	422	25.24%	151	9.03%	5	0.30%	19	1.14%	1,672
Hansford	124	67.39%	54	29.35%	0	0.00%	0	0.00%	6	3.26%	184
Hardeman	967	73.04%	252	19.03%	61	4.61%	0	0.00%	44	3.32%	1,324
Hardin	999	72.60%	202	14.68%	89	6.47%	58	4.22%	28	2.03%	1,376
Harris	14,808	51.35%	7,735	26.82%	693	2.40%	5,289	18.34%	312	1.08%	28,837
Harrison	2,134	67.09%	377	11.85%	86	2.70%	576	18.11%	8	0.25%	3,181
Hartley	144	61.54%	81	34.62%	2	0.85%	0	0.00%	7	2.99%	234
Haskell	1,127	68.85%	254	15.52%	111	6.78%	0	0.00%	145	8.86%	1,637
Hays	1,075	64.92%	242	14.61%	322	19.44%	16	0.97%	1	0.06%	1,656
Hemphill	417	61.50%	253	37.32%	0	0.00%	0	0.00%	8	1.18%	678
Henderson	1,684	58.29%	538	18.62%	370	12.81%	124	4.29%	173	5.99%	2,889
Hidalgo	2,409	67.69%	1,108	31.13%	21	0.59%	2	0.06%	19	0.53%	3,559
Hill	3,254	63.12%	1,022	19.83%	800	15.52%	48	0.93%	31	0.60%	5,155
Hood	697	68.33%	175	17.16%	101	9.90%	27	2.65%	20	1.96%	1,020
Hopkins	2,548	68.98%	837	22.66%	99	2.68%	99	2.68%	111	3.00%	3,694
Houston	1,475	49.48%	385	12.92%	584	19.59%	451	15.13%	86	2.88%	2,981
Howard	703	77.51%	107	11.80%	43	4.74%	0	0.00%	54	5.95%	907
Hudspeth	97	71.85%	37	27.41%	0	0.00%	0	0.00%	1	0.74%	135
Hunt	4,397	75.97%	880	15.20%	228	3.94%	204	3.52%	79	1.36%	5,788
Hutchinson	135	54.66%	106	42.91%	2	0.81%	0	0.00%	4	1.62%	247
Irion	148	66.07%	45	20.09%	25	11.16%	0	0.00%	6	2.68%	224
Jack	566	64.25%	253	28.72%	14	1.59%	0	0.00%	48	5.45%	881
Jackson	562	53.27%	355	33.65%	115	10.90%	5	0.47%	18	1.71%	1,055
Jasper	793	72.42%	62	5.66%	211	19.27%	18	1.64%	11	1.00%	1,095
Jeff Davis	91	68.94%	41	31.06%	0	0.00%	0	0.00%	0	0.00%	132
Jefferson	4,246	65.83%	1,110	17.21%	143	2.22%	802	12.43%	149	2.31%	6,450
Jim Hogg	70	75.27%	23	24.73%	0	0.00%	0	0.00%	0	0.00%	93
Jim Wells	304	58.02%	169	32.25%	38	7.25%	0	0.00%	13	2.48%	524
Johnson	3,041	71.99%	661	15.65%	400	9.47%	46	1.09%	76	1.80%	4,224
Jones	1,792	78.53%	270	11.83%	152	6.66%	0	0.00%	68	2.98%	2,282
Karnes	642	41.47%	484	31.27%	403	26.03%	16	1.03%	3	0.19%	1,548
Kaufman	3,070	68.80%	573	12.84%	215	4.82%	573	12.84%	31	0.69%	4,462
Kendall	142	12.25%	846	72.99%	163	14.06%	2	0.17%	6	0.52%	1,159
Kent	214	75.62%	45	15.90%	0	0.00%	1	0.35%	23	8.13%	283
Kerr	612	53.26%	464	40.38%	48	4.18%	0	0.00%	25	2.18%	1,149
Kimble	299	60.90%	150	30.55%	29	5.91%	0	0.00%	13	2.65%	491
King	157	98.13%	0	0.00%	1	0.63%	0	0.00%	2	1.25%	160
Kinney	98	39.68%	137	55.47%	11	4.45%	0	0.00%	1	0.40%	247
Kleberg	455	67.61%	172	25.56%	27	4.01%	10	1.49%	9	1.34%	673
Knox	773	75.05%	159	15.44%	64	6.21%	0	0.00%	34	3.30%	1,030
Lamar	3,765	75.21%	639	12.76%	87	1.74%	459	9.17%	56	1.12%	5,006
Lamb	264	63.01%	136	32.46%	14	3.34%	0	0.00%	5	1.19%	419
Lampasas	778	57.72%	227	16.84%	328	24.33%	5	0.37%	10	0.74%	1,348
La Salle	252	80.25%	53	16.88%	8	2.55%	0	0.00%	1	0.32%	314
Lavaca	1,249	39.10%	100	3.13%	1,659	51.94%	144	4.51%	42	1.31%	3,194
Lee	712	32.09%	325	14.65%	836	37.67%	332	14.96%	14	0.63%	2,219
Leon	1,124	54.06%	220	10.58%	616	29.63%	74	3.56%	45	2.16%	2,079
Limestone	2,165	63.86%	408	12.04%	371	10.94%	401	11.83%	45	1.33%	3,390
Lipscomb	350	42.63%	425	51.77%	0	0.00%	0	0.00%	46	5.60%	821
Live Oak	234	47.18%	161	32.46%	56	11.29%	0	0.00%	45	9.07%	496
Llano	665	60.90%	184	16.85%	239	21.89%	1	0.09%	3	0.27%	1,092
Lubbock	1,180	81.27%	204	14.05%	30	2.07%	7	0.48%	31	2.13%	1,452
Lynn	538	78.89%	76	11.14%	56	8.21%	1	0.15%	11	1.61%	682
McCulloch	780	71.17%	210	19.16%	70	6.39%	1	0.09%	35	3.19%	1,096
McLennan	4,975	63.71%	1,655	21.19%	936	11.99%	192	2.46%	51	0.65%	7,809
McMullen	72	67.92%	33	31.13%	0	0.00%	0	0.00%	1	0.94%	106
Madison	650	57.73%	63	5.60%	263	23.36%	144	12.79%	6	0.53%	1,126
Marion	430	38.05%	392	34.69%	3	0.27%	304	26.90%	1	0.09%	1,130
Martin	136	77.71%	33	18.86%	6	3.43%	0	0.00%	0	0.00%	175
Mason	304	45.17%	269	39.97%	93	13.82%	0	0.00%	7	1.04%	673
Matagorda	992	47.44%	918	43.90%	69	3.30%	58	2.77%	54	2.58%	2,091
Maverick	173	36.42%	296	62.32%	1	0.21%	1	0.21%	4	0.84%	475
Medina	519	30.73%	772	45.71%	389	23.03%	2	0.12%	7	0.41%	1,689
Menard	197	46.24%	203	47.65%	3	0.70%	0	0.00%	23	5.40%	426
Midland	271	79.47%	68	19.94%	2	0.59%	0	0.00%	0	0.00%	341
Milam	2,598	53.81%	371	7.68%	1,321	27.36%	407	8.43%	131	2.71%	4,828
Mills	669	55.70%	247	20.57%	257	21.40%	0	0.00%	28	2.33%	1,201
Mitchell	694	81.65%	89	10.47%	40	4.71%	0	0.00%	27	3.18%	850
Montague	1,714	71.57%	474	19.79%	53	2.21%	0	0.00%	154	6.43%	2,395
Montgomery	935	64.48%	203	14.00%	123	8.48%	144	9.93%	45	3.10%	1,450
Moore	101	87.83%	13	11.30%	1	0.87%	0	0.00%	0	0.00%	115
Morris	669	73.68%	164	18.06%	5	0.55%	68	7.49%	2	0.22%	908
Motley	345	88.24%	40	10.23%	1	0.26%	0	0.00%	5	1.28%	391
Nacogdoches	1,794	65.79%	238	8.73%	340	12.47%	276	10.12%	79	2.90%	2,727
Navarro	3,328	64.35%	821	15.87%	744	14.39%	248	4.80%	31	0.60%	5,172
Newton	420	62.87%	58	8.68%	148	22.16%	30	4.49%	12	1.80%	668
Nolan	923	79.98%	175	15.16%	43	3.73%	0	0.00%	13	1.13%	1,154
Nueces	1,246	70.12%	383	21.55%	64	3.60%	50	2.81%	34	1.91%	1,777
Ochiltree	280	67.47%	135	32.53%	0	0.00%	0	0.00%	0	0.00%	415
Oldham	139	72.40%	52	27.08%	0	0.00%	0	0.00%	1	0.52%	192
Orange	1,055	81.47%	121	9.34%	83	6.41%	21	1.62%	15	1.16%	1,295
Palo Pinto	1,645	75.74%	342	15.75%	80	3.68%	11	0.51%	94	4.33%	2,172
Panola	1,086	65.46%	268	16.15%	186	11.21%	95	5.73%	24	1.45%	1,659
Parker	1,765	74.50%	488	20.60%	14	0.59%	0	0.00%	102	4.31%	2,369
Parmer	189	55.43%	140	41.06%	3	0.88%	0	0.00%	9	2.64%	341
Pecos	386	47.42%	394	48.40%	31	3.81%	1	0.12%	2	0.25%	814
Polk	810	63.04%	255	19.84%	139	10.82%	55	4.28%	26	2.02%	1,285
Potter	1,374	77.58%	358	20.21%	10	0.56%	1	0.06%	28	1.58%	1,771
Presidio	238	65.03%	122	33.33%	1	0.27%	0	0.00%	5	1.37%	366
Rains	462	58.56%	189	23.95%	16	2.03%	26	3.30%	96	12.17%	789
Randall	360	65.34%	183	33.21%	5	0.91%	0	0.00%	3	0.54%	551
Reagan	49	100.00%	0	0.00%	0	0.00%	0	0.00%	0	0.00%	49
Real	177	57.28%	111	35.92%	9	2.91%	1	0.32%	11	3.56%	309
Red River	2,263	63.96%	799	22.58%	98	2.77%	326	9.21%	52	1.47%	3,538
Reeves	457	83.09%	91	16.55%	0	0.00%	0	0.00%	2	0.36%	550
Refugio	227	35.19%	360	55.81%	41	6.36%	1	0.16%	16	2.48%	645
Roberts	173	72.38%	60	25.10%	5	2.09%	0	0.00%	1	0.42%	239
Robertson	1,634	64.97%	225	8.95%	515	20.48%	134	5.33%	7	0.28%	2,515
Rockwall	873	87.83%	104	10.46%	11	1.11%	3	0.30%	3	0.30%	994
Runnels	1,197	64.53%	332	17.90%	279	15.04%	4	0.22%	43	2.32%	1,855
Rusk	1,555	54.31%	745	26.02%	242	8.45%	284	9.92%	37	1.29%	2,863
Sabine	637	64.67%	61	6.19%	269	27.31%	10	1.02%	8	0.81%	985
San Augustine	658	42.62%	121	7.84%	749	48.51%	7	0.45%	9	0.58%	1,544
San Jacinto	320	46.31%	7	1.01%	186	26.92%	173	25.04%	5	0.72%	691
San Patricio	620	64.92%	308	32.25%	11	1.15%	0	0.00%	16	1.68%	955
San Saba	874	59.21%	180	12.20%	396	26.83%	3	0.20%	23	1.56%	1,476
Schleicher	211	69.41%	81	26.64%	12	3.95%	0	0.00%	0	0.00%	304
Scurry	801	79.62%	151	15.01%	30	2.98%	0	0.00%	24	2.39%	1,006
Shackelford	342	64.90%	116	22.01%	33	6.26%	1	0.19%	35	6.64%	527
Shelby	1,700	72.77%	150	6.42%	220	9.42%	174	7.45%	92	3.94%	2,336
Sherman	170	67.73%	77	30.68%	0	0.00%	0	0.00%	4	1.59%	251
Smith	2,965	63.45%	707	15.13%	357	7.64%	553	11.83%	91	1.95%	4,673
Somervell	198	52.94%	92	24.60%	51	13.64%	0	0.00%	33	8.82%	374
Starr	418	82.45%	89	17.55%	0	0.00%	0	0.00%	0	0.00%	507
Stephens	643	76.09%	141	16.69%	33	3.91%	0	0.00%	28	3.31%	845
Sterling	152	81.72%	17	9.14%	17	9.14%	0	0.00%	0	0.00%	186
Stonewall	356	65.08%	134	24.50%	33	6.03%	1	0.18%	23	4.20%	547
Sutton	190	62.30%	104	34.10%	11	3.61%	0	0.00%	0	0.00%	305
Swisher	443	73.59%	148	24.58%	2	0.33%	1	0.17%	8	1.33%	602
Tarrant	12,431	72.66%	3,486	20.38%	191	1.12%	833	4.87%	167	0.98%	17,108
Taylor	1,932	79.25%	300	12.31%	141	5.78%	8	0.33%	57	2.34%	2,438
Terrell	155	57.84%	95	35.45%	12	4.48%	1	0.37%	5	1.87%	268
Terry	270	76.06%	39	10.99%	30	8.45%	0	0.00%	16	4.51%	355
Throckmorton	399	80.12%	72	14.46%	11	2.21%	0	0.00%	16	3.21%	498
Titus	1,094	60.95%	508	28.30%	12	0.67%	144	8.02%	37	2.06%	1,795
Tom Green	1,264	76.61%	256	15.52%	87	5.27%	19	1.15%	24	1.45%	1,650
Travis	3,541	59.97%	1,204	20.39%	719	12.18%	380	6.44%	61	1.03%	5,905
Trinity	643	57.00%	125	11.08%	275	24.38%	51	4.52%	34	3.01%	1,128
Tyler	1,066	76.53%	115	8.26%	128	9.19%	69	4.95%	15	1.08%	1,393
Upshur	1,222	52.45%	616	26.44%	343	14.72%	107	4.59%	42	1.80%	2,330
Upton	46	64.79%	25	35.21%	0	0.00%	0	0.00%	0	0.00%	71
Uvalde	743	72.77%	237	23.21%	30	2.94%	0	0.00%	11	1.08%	1,021
Val Verde	418	58.22%	296	41.23%	0	0.00%	0	0.00%	4	0.56%	718
Van Zandt	1,958	61.07%	728	22.71%	203	6.33%	34	1.06%	283	8.83%	3,206
Victoria	686	36.51%	782	41.62%	329	17.51%	66	3.51%	16	0.85%	1,879
Walker	788	45.73%	404	23.45%	375	21.76%	148	8.59%	8	0.46%	1,723
Waller	674	53.92%	167	13.36%	180	14.40%	224	17.92%	5	0.40%	1,250
Ward	181	68.30%	79	29.81%	0	0.00%	0	0.00%	5	1.89%	265
Washington	796	24.72%	684	21.24%	1,267	39.35%	471	14.63%	2	0.06%	3,220
Webb	633	56.67%	468	41.90%	16	1.43%	0	0.00%	0	0.00%	1,117
Wharton	836	35.38%	852	36.06%	500	21.16%	124	5.25%	51	2.16%	2,363
Wheeler	516	68.62%	198	26.33%	1	0.13%	1	0.13%	36	4.79%	752
Wichita	3,812	70.46%	1,487	27.49%	26	0.48%	0	0.00%	85	1.57%	5,410
Wilbarger	1,118	72.50%	335	21.73%	34	2.20%	1	0.06%	54	3.50%	1,542
Willacy	53	85.48%	9	14.52%	0	0.00%	0	0.00%	0	0.00%	62
Williamson	2,677	53.00%	819	16.21%	1,443	28.57%	84	1.66%	28	0.55%	5,051
Wilson	753	42.33%	820	46.09%	192	10.79%	4	0.22%	10	0.56%	1,779
Winkler	17	89.47%	2	10.53%	0	0.00%	0	0.00%	0	0.00%	19
Wise	2,031	74.53%	579	21.25%	64	2.35%	0	0.00%	51	1.87%	2,725
Wood	1,643	51.99%	798	25.25%	480	15.19%	141	4.46%	98	3.10%	3,160
Yoakum	79	97.53%	0	0.00%	0	0.00%	0	0.00%	2	2.47%	81
Young	1,214	82.59%	209	14.22%	8	0.54%	1	0.07%	38	2.59%	1,470
Zapata	50	33.78%	98	66.22%	0	0.00%	0	0.00%	0	0.00%	148
Zavala	264	66.84%	101	25.57%	14	3.54%	0	0.00%	16	4.05%	395
Bailey (Note: No returns were canvassed for Bailey County, Franklin County or Liberty County. Whatever voters existed in these counties were listed in totals for neighbouring counties)	0	N/A	0	N/A	0	N/A	0	N/A	0	N/A	0
Franklin	0	N/A	0	N/A	0	N/A	0	N/A	0	N/A	0
Liberty	0	N/A	0	N/A	0	N/A	0	N/A	0	N/A	0
Totals	289,627	59.49%	113,646	23.34%	48,096	9.88%	27,316	5.61%	8,139	1.67%	486,824

== See also ==
- United States presidential elections in Texas
