= 1920 Texas gubernatorial election =

- November 2, 1920
- Turnout: 68.3%
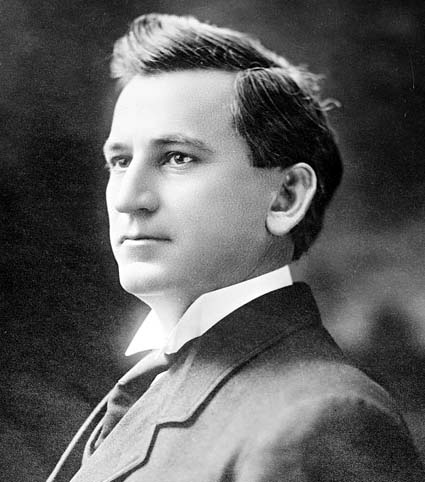

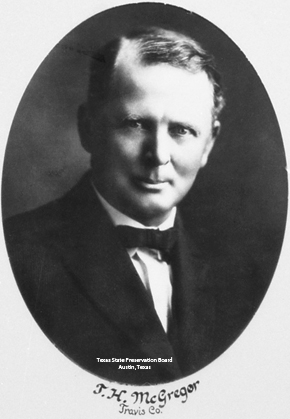
Nominee	Pat Morris Neff	J. G. Culbertson
Party	Democratic	Republican
Popular vote	289,188	90,217
Percentage	60.03%	18.73%
Nominee	T. H. McGregor	Hickerson Capers
Party	American	Black-and-Tan Republican
Popular vote	69,380	26,091
Percentage	14.40%	5.42%
- County results Neff: 30–40% 40–50% 50–60% 60–70% 70–80% 80–90% 90–100% Culberson: 30–40% 40–50% 50–60% McGregor: 30–40% 40–50% 50–60% 60–70% No votes
Governor before election
William P. Hobby
Democratic
Elected Governor
Pat Morris Neff
Democratic

The 1920 Texas gubernatorial election was held on November 2, 1920 in order to elect the Governor of Texas. Former Democratic state representative Pat Morris Neff won comfortably in a four-way race against Republican nominee J. G. Culbertson, American Party of Texas nominee T. H. McGregor, and Black and Tan Republican nominee Hickerson Capers.

== Democratic primary ==
=== Candidates ===
- Joseph W. Bailey, former U.S. Senator
- Benjmain F. Looney
- Pat Morris Neff, McLennan County prosectuor and former Speaker of the Texas House
- R. Ewing Thomason

=== Results ===
In the primary, held on July 24, 1920, former Senator Joseph W. Bailey won the most votes, with Neff in second place; with neither candidate achieving 50%, a runoff was required.

Democratic primary results
Party	Candidate	Votes	%
Democratic	Joseph W. Bailey	152,340	33.87
Democratic	Patrick Morris Neff	149,818	33.31
Democratic	R. Ewing Thomason	99,002	22.01
Democratic	Benjamin F. Looney	48,640	10.81
Total votes		449,800	100.00

=== Runoff results ===
In the runoff, Neff won by just under 18 percentage points against Bailey, or 79,373 raw votes, making him the Democratic nominee and the presumptive governor; Texas — in this era — was a Democratic-dominated southern state in which the primary was almost always the deciding race in the election.

Democratic runoff results
Party	Candidate	Votes	%
Democratic	Patrick Morris Neff	264,075	58.84
Democratic	Joseph W. Bailey	184,702	41.16
Total votes		448,777	100.00

== General election ==
Neff faced numerous opponents in the general election, including T.H. McGregor of the American Party, a party established by formerly impeached and convicted Texas governor "James "Pa" Ferguson for the purposes of running for president in the concurrent presidential election. Neff received 60.0% of the vote, a lower share than usual for most Democrats in Texas at the time, but this was due large, multi-candidate field rather than the more typical 1-on-1 between a Democrat and a Republican.

=== Candidates ===
- Pat Morris Neff (Democratic), former County Attorney for McLennan County.
- John G. Culbertston (Republican), businessman and president of the Witchita Falls Motor Company.
- Temple H. McGregor (American), former member of the Texas Senate
- Lee Lightfoot Rhodes (Socialist), former member of the Texas House of Representatives.
- Hickson C. Capers (Black and Tan Republican), printer.

=== Results ===
1920 Texas gubernatorial election
Party	Candidate	Votes	%
Democratic	Pat Morris Neff (incumbent)	289,188	60.03
Republican	J. G. Culbertson	90,217	18.73
American	T. H. McGregor	69,380	14.40
Black and Tan Republican	Hickson Capers	26,091	5.42
Socialist	Lee Lightfoot Rhodes	6,796	1.41
Write-in		59	0.01
Total votes		481,731	100.00
Democratic hold			
