= 1918 Wisconsin lieutenant gubernatorial election =

- November 5, 1918
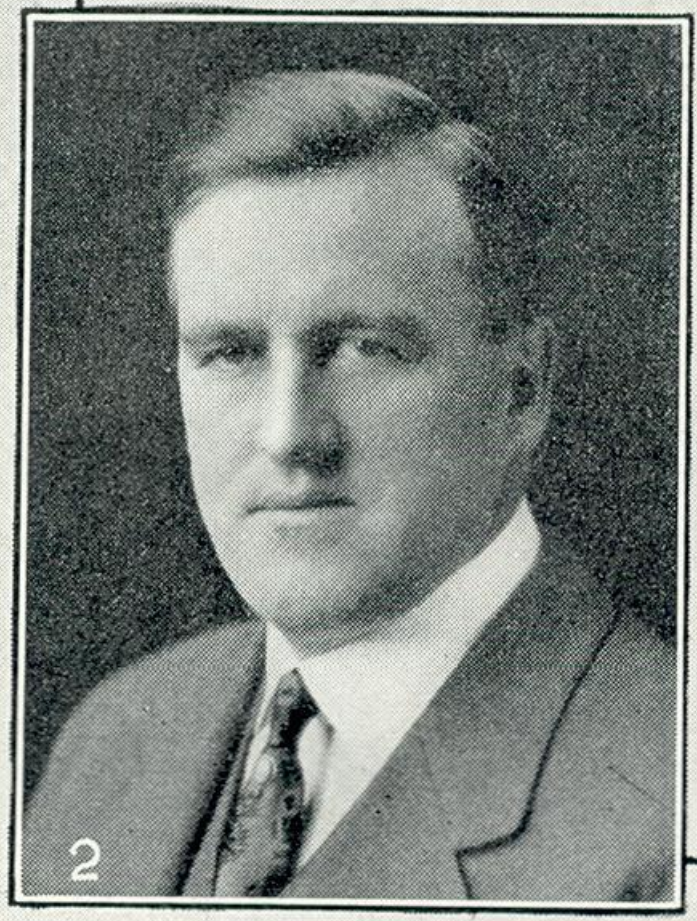

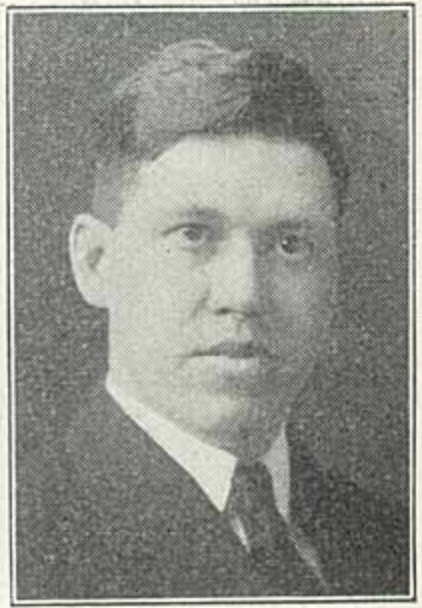
Nominee	Edward Dithmar	John W. Hogan	James Vint
Party	Republican	Democratic	Social-Democratic
Popular vote	165,401	92,889	56,374
Percentage	51.72%	29.05%	17.63%
Lieutenant Governor before election
Edward Dithmar
Republican
Elected Lieutenant Governor
Edward Dithmar
Republican

The 1918 Wisconsin lieutenant gubernatorial election was held on November 5, 1918, in order to elect the lieutenant governor of Wisconsin. Incumbent Republican lieutenant governor Edward Dithmar defeated Democratic nominee John W. Hogan, Social-Democratic nominee and former member of the Wisconsin State Assembly James Vint and Prohibition nominee Clyde D. Mead.

== Republican primary ==
The Republican primary election was held on September 3, 1918. Incumbent lieutenant governor Edward Dithmar received a plurality of the votes (44.94%) against incumbent state senator Charles H. Everett and candidate Harley Nickerson, and was thus elected as the nominee for the general election.

=== Results ===
1918 Republican lieutenant gubernatorial primary
Party	Candidate	Votes	%
Republican	Edward Dithmar (incumbent)	74,402	44.94%
Republican	Charles H. Everett	53,266	32.17%
Republican	Harley Nickerson	37,895	22.89%
Total votes		165,563	100.00%

== General election ==
On election day, November 5, 1918, incumbent Republican lieutenant governor Edward Dithmar won re-election by a margin of 72,512 votes against his foremost opponent Democratic nominee John W. Hogan, thereby retaining Republican control over the office of lieutenant governor. Dithmar was sworn in for his third term on January 6, 1919.

=== Results ===
Wisconsin lieutenant gubernatorial election, 1918
Party	Candidate	Votes	%
Republican	Edward Dithmar (incumbent)	165,401	51.72
Democratic	John W. Hogan	92,889	29.05
Social-Democratic	James Vint	56,374	17.63
Prohibition	Clyde D. Mead	5,084	1.59
	Scattering	31	0.01
Total votes		319,779	100.00
Republican hold			
