= Henry Huber =

20th century American politician

Henry A. Huber
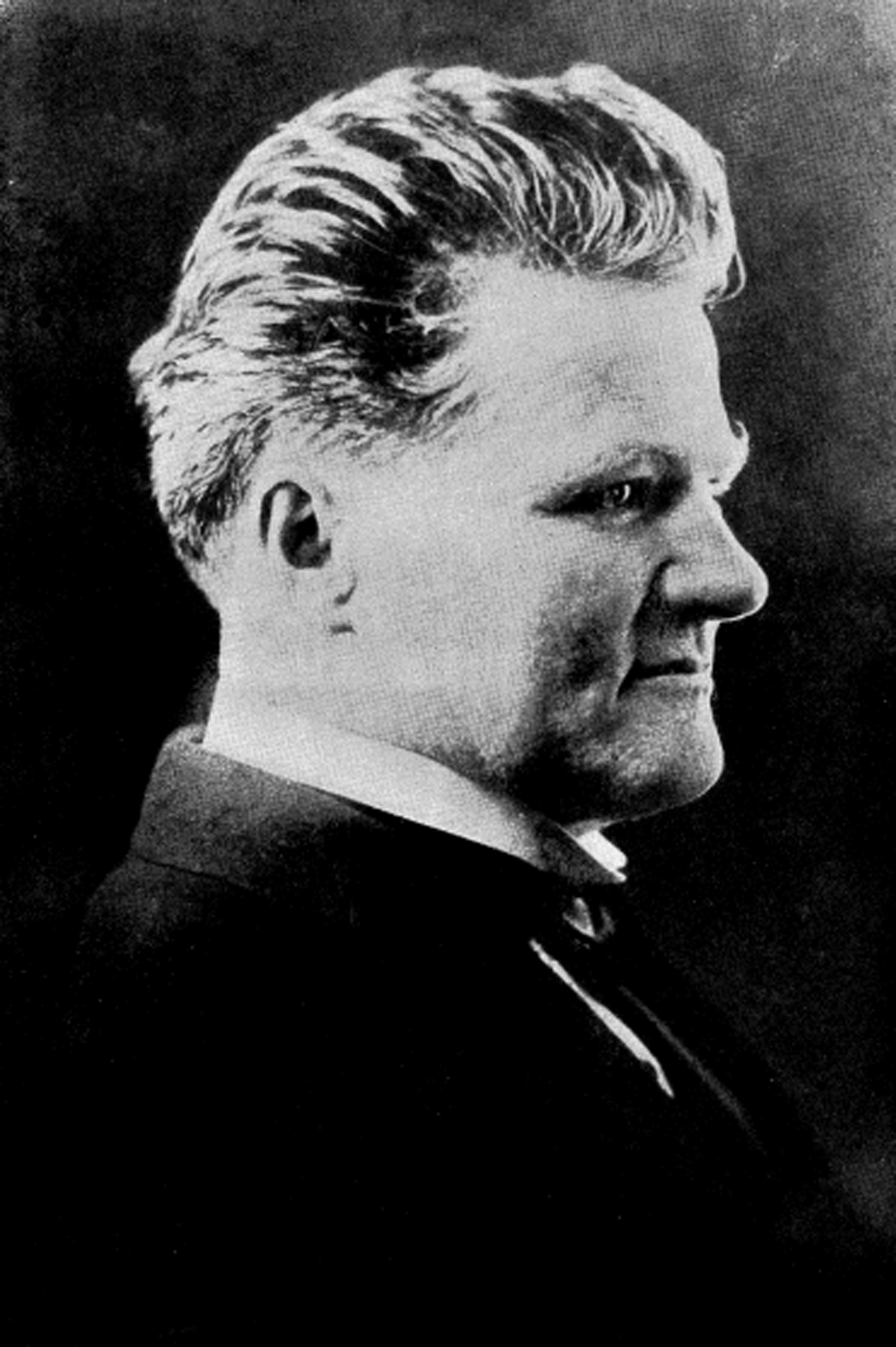

25th Lieutenant Governor of Wisconsin
- In office January 5, 1925 – January 2, 1933
- Governor: John J. Blaine; Fred R. Zimmerman; Walter J. Kohler Sr.; Philip La Follette
- Preceded by: George Comings
- Succeeded by: Thomas J. O'Malley

Member of the Wisconsin Senate from the 26th district
- In office January 6, 1913 – January 5, 1925
- Preceded by: John S. Donald
- Succeeded by: Harry Sauthoff

Member of the Wisconsin State Assembly from the Dane 2nd district
- In office January 2, 1905 – January 7, 1907
- Preceded by: Torger G. Thompson
- Succeeded by: Ole P. Sorenson

Personal details
- Born: November 6, 1869 Evergreen, Allegheny County, Pennsylvania, U.S.
- Died: January 31, 1933 (aged 63) Madison General Hospital, Madison, Wisconsin, U.S.
- Resting place: Riverside Cemetery, Stoughton, Wisconsin
- Party: Republican
- Spouse: Minnie P. Pratt (died 1934)
- Education: Albion Academy; University of Wisconsin Law School
- Profession: Lawyer

Henry Allen Huber (November 6, 1869 – January 31, 1933) was an American lawyer and progressive Republican politician from Stoughton, Wisconsin. He was the 25th lieutenant governor of Wisconsin, serving from 1925 through 1933. He also served 12 years in the Wisconsin Senate and two years in the Wisconsin State Assembly representing Dane County. Earlier in his career, he also served as an executive clerk to Wisconsin governor Robert M. La Follette. He is known for introducing the first form of state unemployment insurance legislation in the United States, and is the namesake of the "Huber Law" which created Wisconsin's first work release program for state prisoners.

== Biography ==
Huber was born in Evergreen, Allegheny County, Pennsylvania, in 1869. At age ten, he moved with his parents to Pleasant Springs, Wisconsin. He graduated from the University of Wisconsin in 1892 and set up a law practice in Stoughton. He was city attorney for Stoughton, Wisconsin, and served on the Dane County Board of Supervisors. He served as a Republican in the Wisconsin State Assembly from 1905 until 1906, and in the Wisconsin State Senate from 1913 until 1924.

During his time as a state senator, he gained national recognition for two landmark pieces of legislation. He introduced the first unemployment insurance legislation in American history, and was the author of Wisconsin's first work release program—still referred to in Wisconsin as the "Huber Law".

In 1924, incumbent Lieutenant Governor George Comings announced he would run for Governor. Huber thus decided that rather than running for a fourth term in the State Senate, he would seek the office of Lieutenant Governor of Wisconsin in 1924. Huber ultimately faced no opposition in the Republican primary, and went on to win the general election with 60% of the vote. He went on to win re-election in 1926, 1928, and 1930, facing competitive primaries and general elections each time. During his four terms as lieutenant governor, he served alongside four different governors.

He ran for a fifth term in 1932, but was defeated in the Republican primary by conservative Republican Harry Dahl, who went on to lose the general election to Democrat Thomas J. O'Malley.

== Death ==
Huber died less than a month after leaving office, in January 1933. He was admitted to Madison General Hospital on January 30, suffering from a chronic heart condition, and died the next day.

== Electoral history ==
=== Wisconsin Assembly (1904) ===
Wisconsin Assembly, Dane 2nd District Election, 1904
Party	Candidate	Votes	%	±%
General Election, November 8, 1904
Republican	Henry Huber	3,413	62.76%	+26.26%
Democratic	Peter N. Johnson	1,740	32.00%	−31.46%
Prohibition	Robert S. Pearsall	173	3.18%	
	Scattering	112	2.06%	
Plurality		1,673	30.76%	+3.81%
Total votes		5,438	100.0%	+29.72%
Republican gain from Democratic		Swing	57.72%	

=== Wisconsin Senate (1912, 1916, 1920) ===
Year	Election	Date	Elected				Defeated				Total	Plurality
1912	General	Nov. 5	Henry Huber	Republican	8,140	52.86%	J. G. O. Zehnter	Dem.	6,918	44.92%	15,400	1,222
1912	General	Nov. 5	Henry Huber	Republican	8,140	52.86%	William M. McCarthy	Proh.	338	2.19%	15,400	1,222
1916	General	Nov. 7	Henry Huber (inc)	Republican	9,554	61.32%	John C. Kenny	Dem.	6,023	38.66%	15,580	3,531
1920	General	Nov. 2	Henry Huber (inc)	Republican	31,345	99.94%					31,363	31,327

=== Wisconsin Lieutenant Governor (1924, 1926, 1928, 1930) ===
Year	Election	Date	Elected				Defeated				Total	Plurality
1924	General	Nov. 4	Henry Huber	Republican	433,106	60.27%	Karl Mathie	Dem.	215,327	29.96%	718,669	217,779
1924	General	Nov. 4	Henry Huber	Republican	433,106	60.27%	Peter Gilles	Soc.	46,660	6.49%	718,669	217,779
1924	General	Nov. 4	Henry Huber	Republican	433,106	60.27%	Maria I. A. Nelson	Proh.	11,170	1.55%	718,669	217,779
1924	General	Nov. 4	Henry Huber	Republican	433,106	60.27%	John E. Ferris	Ind.R.	8,301	1.16%	718,669	217,779
1924	General	Nov. 4	Henry Huber	Republican	433,106	60.27%	Steve Fisher	Soc.Lab.	2,025	0.28%	718,669	217,779
1924	General	Nov. 4	Henry Huber	Republican	433,106	60.27%	Charles Kuzdas	Work.	1,978	0.28%	718,669	217,779
1926	Primary	Sep. 7	Henry Huber (inc)	Republican	200,514	49.73%	J. N. Tittemore	Rep.	106,807	26.49%	403,206	93,707
1926	Primary	Sep. 7	Henry Huber (inc)	Republican	200,514	49.73%	Conrad Hansen	Rep.	95,885	23.78%	403,206	93,707
1926	General	Nov. 2	Henry Huber (inc)	Republican	395,235	78.92%	William G. Evenson	Dem.	61,865	12.35%	500,831	333,370
1926	General	Nov. 2	Henry Huber (inc)	Republican	395,235	78.92%	Peter Gilles	Soc.	34,283	6.85%	500,831	333,370
1926	General	Nov. 2	Henry Huber (inc)	Republican	395,235	78.92%	Henry H. Tubbs	Proh.	9,448	1.89%	500,831	333,370
1928	Primary	Sep. 4	Henry Huber (inc)	Republican	261,913	60.52%	Chester Werden	Rep.	101,472	23.45%	432,795	160,441
1928	Primary	Sep. 4	Henry Huber (inc)	Republican	261,913	60.52%	Harold L. Plummer	Rep.	69,410	16.04%	432,795	160,441
1928	General	Nov. 6	Henry Huber (inc)	Republican	582,456	64.48%	Leo P. Fox	Dem.	277,497	30.72%	903,254	304,959
1928	General	Nov. 6	Henry Huber (inc)	Republican	582,456	64.48%	S. S. Walkup	Soc.	34,162	3.78%	903,254	304,959
1928	General	Nov. 6	Henry Huber (inc)	Republican	582,456	64.48%	Oliver Needham	Proh.	6,621	0.73%	903,254	304,959
1928	General	Nov. 6	Henry Huber (inc)	Republican	582,456	64.48%	Henry Koski	Work.	1,314	0.15%	903,254	304,959
1928	General	Nov. 6	Henry Huber (inc)	Republican	582,456	64.48%	Emil Wagner	Ind.Lab.	1,204	0.13%	903,254	304,959
1930	Primary	Sep. 16	Henry Huber (inc)	Republican	318,225	54.87%	Harry Dahl	Rep.	261,722	45.13%	579,947	56,503
1930	General	Nov. 4	Henry Huber (inc)	Republican	370,075	66.04%	Bert Husting	Dem.	141,632	25.27%	560,373	228,443
1930	General	Nov. 4	Henry Huber (inc)	Republican	370,075	66.04%	John R. Severin	Soc.	32,107	5.73%	560,373	228,443
1930	General	Nov. 4	Henry Huber (inc)	Republican	370,075	66.04%	Otto D. Kahl	Proh.	13,404	2.39%	560,373	228,443
1930	General	Nov. 4	Henry Huber (inc)	Republican	370,075	66.04%	William Clark	Comm.	3,155	0.56%	560,373	228,443
1932	Primary	Sep. 20	Harry Dahl	Republican	379,060	56.74%	Henry Huber (inc)	Rep.	288,971	43.26%	668,031	90,089

== Sources ==
- "Wisconsin Constitutional Officers; Lieutenant Governors" (PDF). State of Wisconsin Blue Book 2005–2006. Wisconsin Legislative Reference Bureau. July 2005. p. 31. Archived from the original (PDF) on October 25, 2007.

Party political offices
Preceded by George Comings	Republican nominee for Lieutenant Governor of Wisconsin; 1924, 1926, 1928, 1930	Succeeded by Harry Dahl
Wisconsin State Assembly
Preceded by Torger G. Thompson	Member of the Wisconsin State Assembly from the Dane 2nd district January 2, 1905 – January 7, 1907	Succeeded by Ole P. Sorenson
Wisconsin Senate
Preceded by John S. Donald	Member of the Wisconsin Senate from the 26th district January 6, 1913 – January 5, 1925	Succeeded by Harry Sauthoff
Political offices
Preceded by George Comings	Lieutenant Governor of Wisconsin; January 5, 1925 – January 2, 1933	Succeeded by Thomas J. O'Malley
