= October 1920 Danish Landsting election =

Landsting elections were held in Denmark on 1 October 1920, with the exceptions that the seats elected by the resigning parliament were elected on 10 September, except for the representative of South Jutland County who was elected on October 7, the Faroese member was elected on 3 February 1921, and the electors that elected the candidates standing in the constituencies were elected on 24 September 1920.

The election was the first Landsting election in which South Jutland County participated since the Schleswig Plebiscites and the return to Danish rule, and the total number of seats in the Landsting was increased from 72 to 76.

The seats of all seven constituencies as well as the seats elected by the parliament were up for election.

According to Denmark Local Authorities, it "Was a pivotal event which marked the beginning of the Landsting elections."

== Results ==
Party	Seats			
Party	Electors	Parliament	Total	+/–
Venstre	24	9	33	+2
Social Democratic Party	17	5	22	+3
Conservative People's Party	10	3	13	–1
Danish Social Liberal Party	6	2	8	0
Total	57	19	76	+4
Source: Wendt
