= Work release =

Allowing inmates time out of jail to work

Work release programs allow selected individuals who have been sentenced to spend time in jails, prisons, and halfway houses to work at jobs in the community. These individuals generally return to more supervised settings after work hours. Countries routinely using work release programs include the United States, Canada, the United Kingdom, Australia, New Zealand, France, Portugal, India, Thailand, and Indonesia.

Due to its unusually large prison population and widespread use of work release programs, the United States has the highest number of inmates participating in work release. In recent years, work release is one of the programs that both state and federal prisons have used to deal with prison overcrowding.

== Work release in the US ==
The program began in Wisconsin’s jails in 1913 and was authorized under the "Huber Law", named after the author of the legislation Henry Huber. This legislation allowed jail inmates to leave jail for work, job searching, education or childcare/family care purposes. The law made those receiving wages responsible for room and board, court ordered support for the dependents, payment of other legal obligations and work-related expenditure such as transportation. Any earnings remaining after these costs are given to the inmate on release.

While release under the Huber law began in 1913, the term work release only began to appear in the 1950s and seems to have been coined by Harvey Long in 1952. In 1957, North Carolina established a statewide “work release” program in its prisons for both misdemeanants and felons and California established a county option work release program for misdemeanants in jails the same year. These programs like Wisconsin’s Huber Law programs had goals related to reintegration, family support and lowering the costs of incarceration. The Prison Rehabilitation Act of 1965 established a work release program in the Federal prison system with the specific goal of rehabilitating inmates.

By 2009, work release programs were large, diverse and widespread. Programs existed in all 50 states and were available to those in state prison, local jails and halfway houses. The programs are of varying quality and have multiple and diverse goals. At their origin in Wisconsin, the main goals were to continue employment, family support, and meet other obligations such as child care. North Carolina’s program, one of the largest and oldest, has the goals of addressing critical “labor shortages” and providing inmates the opportunity to support their families and reduce the economic cost of imprisonment.

Decreasing criminal involvement (recidivism) only became an explicit goal of work release programs during the reform era of the 1960s. Beginning in the 1970s, the US Department of Justice funded many evaluations designed to see if work release decreased recidivism. A 2025 review of this now quite large literature, concluded that there is no consistent evidence that participation in work release programs reduces recidivism. However, there is evidence that work release programs can improve employment outcomes and do reduce incarceration costs.

== Realistic expectations for work release ==
As noted above, work release programs have many goals, some realistic and some asking a lot from often poorly funded programs usually carried out in less than ideal settings. At a minimum, work release programs are cost beneficial from society's point of view because they reduce the costs of incarceration. They can also benefit participants because they ease participants post release adjustment, provide support for families and can improve labor market outcomes. In general, these programs probably do not impact recidivism and probably should not be expected to.

== See also ==
- House arrest
