= 1920 Ecuadorian presidential election =

- January 11, 1920
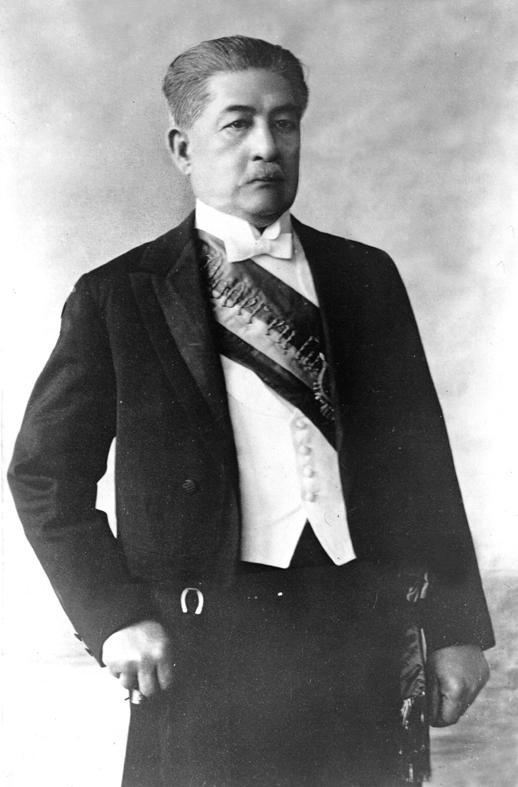

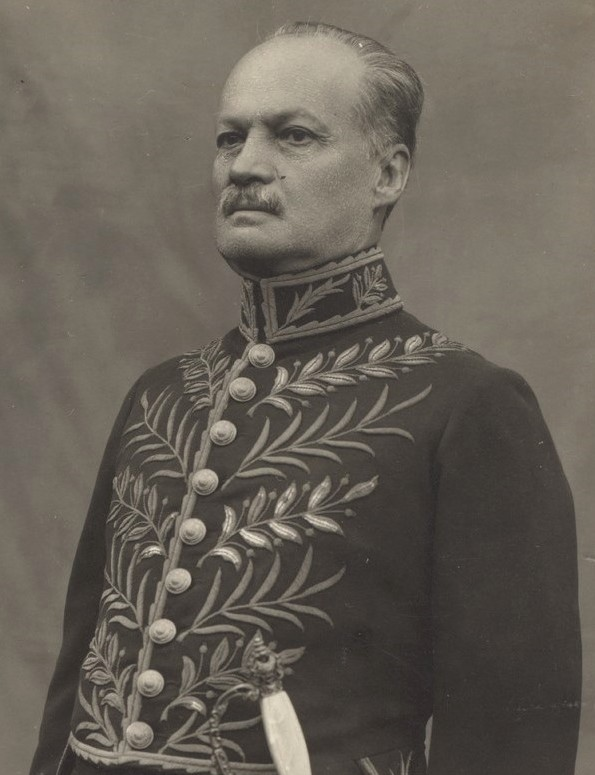
Nominee	José Luis Tamayo	Gonzalo Córdova
Party	Liberal	Liberal
Popular vote	126,945	772
Percentage	99.09%	0.56%
President before election
Alfredo Baquerizo Moreno
Liberal
Elected President
José Luis Tamayo
Liberal

Presidential elections were held in Ecuador on January 11, 1920. The result was a victory for José Luis Tamayo, who received 99% of the vote.

== Results ==
Candidate	Party	Votes	%
José Luis Tamayo	Liberal Party	126,945	99.09
Gonzalo Córdova	Liberal Party	722	0.56
Enrique Baquerizo	Liberal Party	124	0.10
Other candidates		314	0.25
Total		128,105	100.00
Source: Nohlen, TSE
