= 1894 Wisconsin lieutenant gubernatorial election =

- November 6, 1894
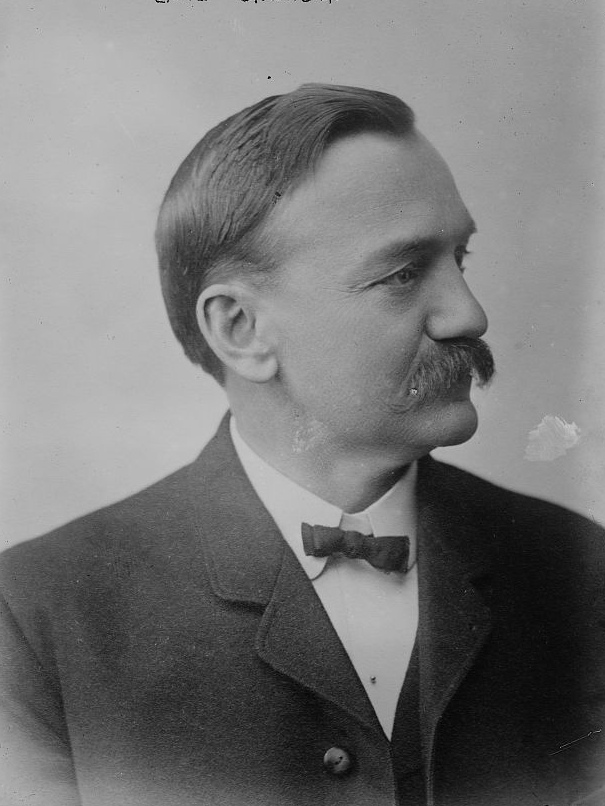

Nominee	Emil Baensch	Adolph J. Schmitz	Frank Smock
Party	Republican	Democratic	Populist
Popular vote	198,181	137,128	24,676
Percentage	53.32%	36.90%	6.64%
Lieutenant Governor before election
Vacant
Elected Lieutenant Governor
Emil Baensch
Republican

The 1894 Wisconsin lieutenant gubernatorial election was held on November 6, 1894, in order to elect the lieutenant governor of Wisconsin. Republican nominee and former County judge of Manitowoc County Emil Baensch defeated Democratic nominee Adolph J. Schmitz, People's nominee Frank Smock and Prohibition nominee Ole Br. Olson.

== General election ==
On election day, November 6, 1894, Republican nominee Emil Baensch won the election by a margin of 61,053 votes against his foremost opponent Democratic nominee Adolph J. Schmitz, thereby gaining Republican control over the office of lieutenant governor. Baensch was sworn in as the 17th lieutenant governor of Wisconsin on January 7, 1895.

=== Results ===
Wisconsin lieutenant gubernatorial election, 1894
Party	Candidate	Votes	%
Republican	Emil Baensch	198,181	53.32
Democratic	Adolph J. Schmitz	137,128	36.90
Populist	Frank Smock	24,676	6.64
Prohibition	Ole Br. Olson	11,455	3.08
	Scattering	227	0.06
Total votes		371,667	100.00
Republican gain from Democratic			
