= 1928 Texas gubernatorial election =

- November 6, 1928
- Turnout: 51.6% ▲31.1%
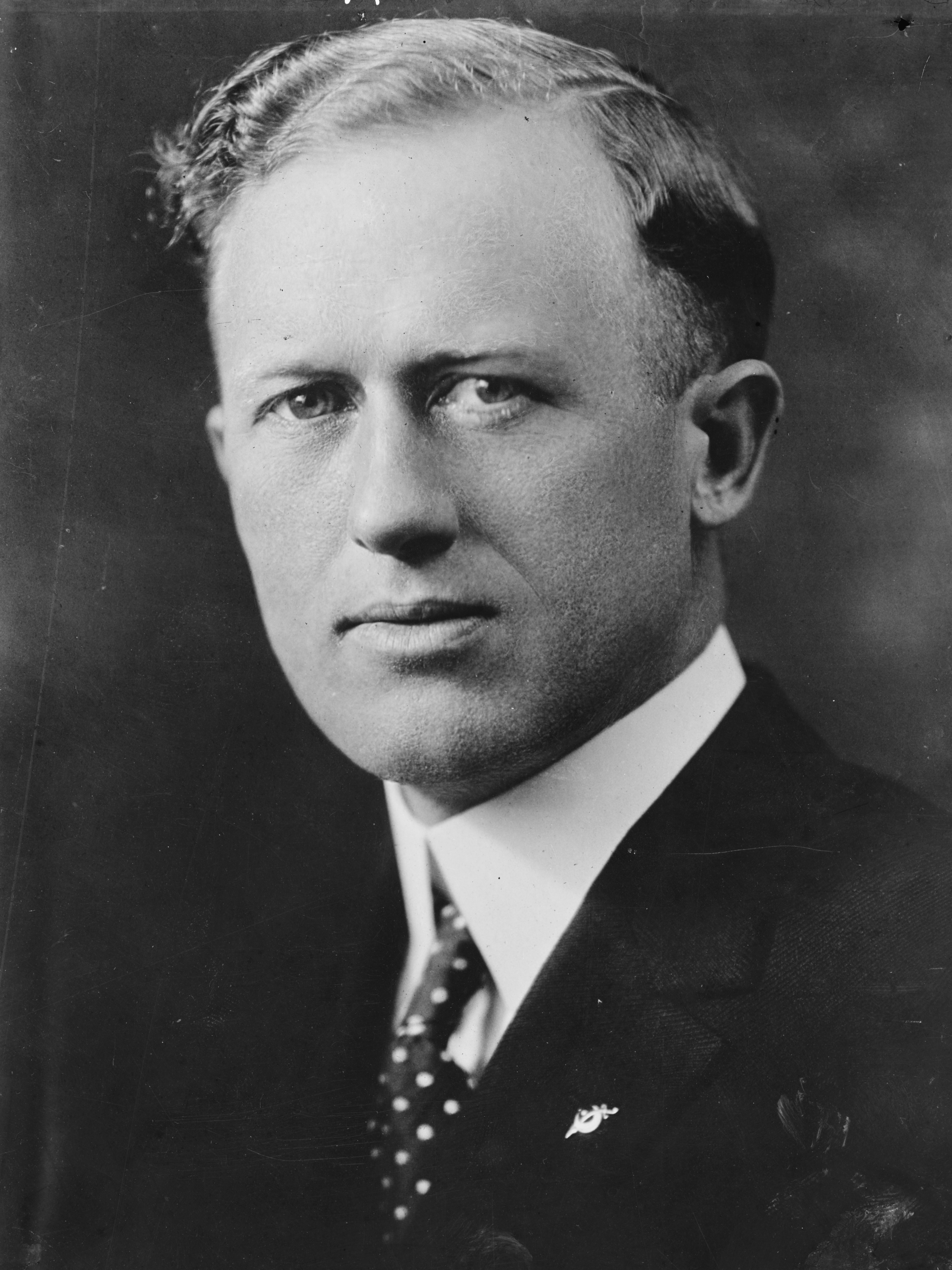

Nominee	Dan Moody	W. H. Holmes
Party	Democratic	Republican
Popular vote	582,968	123,337
Percentage	82.43%	17.44%
- County results Moody: 50–60% 60–70% 70–80% 80–90% >90% Holmes: 50–60% No votes
Governor before election
Dan Moody
Democratic
Elected Governor
Dan Moody
Democratic

The 1928 Texas gubernatorial election was held on November 6, 1928, in order to elect the Governor of Texas. Incumbent Democratic Governor Dan Moody won re-election against Republican nominee W. H. Holmes.

== Democratic primary ==
The Democratic primary election was held on July 28, 1928. As incumbent Governor Dan Moody won a majority of the vote, a run-off was unnecessary.

=== Candidates ===
- William E. Hawkins, former associate justice of the Texas Supreme Court
- Dan Moody, incumbent Governor of Texas
- Louis J. Wardlaw, incumbent state circuit court judge and ally of James E. Ferguson.
- Edith Wilmans, former member of the Texas House of Representatives and first woman elected to the Texas legislature.

=== Results ===
Candidate	Votes	%
Dan Moody	442,080	59.91
Louis J. Wardlaw	245,508	33.27
William E. Hawkins	32,076	4.35
Edith Wilmans	18,237	2.47
Total	737,901	100.00

== General election ==
On election day, November 6, 1928, Democratic nominee Dan Moody won re-election by a margin of 459,631 votes against his foremost opponent Republican nominee W. H. Holmes, thereby retaining Democratic control over the office of Governor. Moody was sworn in for his second term on January 20, 1929.

=== Candidates ===
- W. H. Holmes (Republican), oil operator from Amarillo.
- Dan Moody, incumbent Governor
- Lee Lightfoot Rhodes (Socialist), former member of the Texas House of Representatives.
- Joseph Stedham (Communist)

=== Results ===
Texas gubernatorial election, 1928
Party	Candidate	Votes	%
Democratic	Dan Moody (incumbent)	582,968	82.43
Republican	W. H. Holmes	123,337	17.44
Socialist	Lee Lightfoot Rhodes	787	0.11
Communist	J. Stedham	109	0.02
Total votes		707,201	100.00
Democratic hold			
