= George Comings =

American dairyman, politician, 24th Lieutenant Governor of Wisconsin (1849–1942)

George Fisher Comings
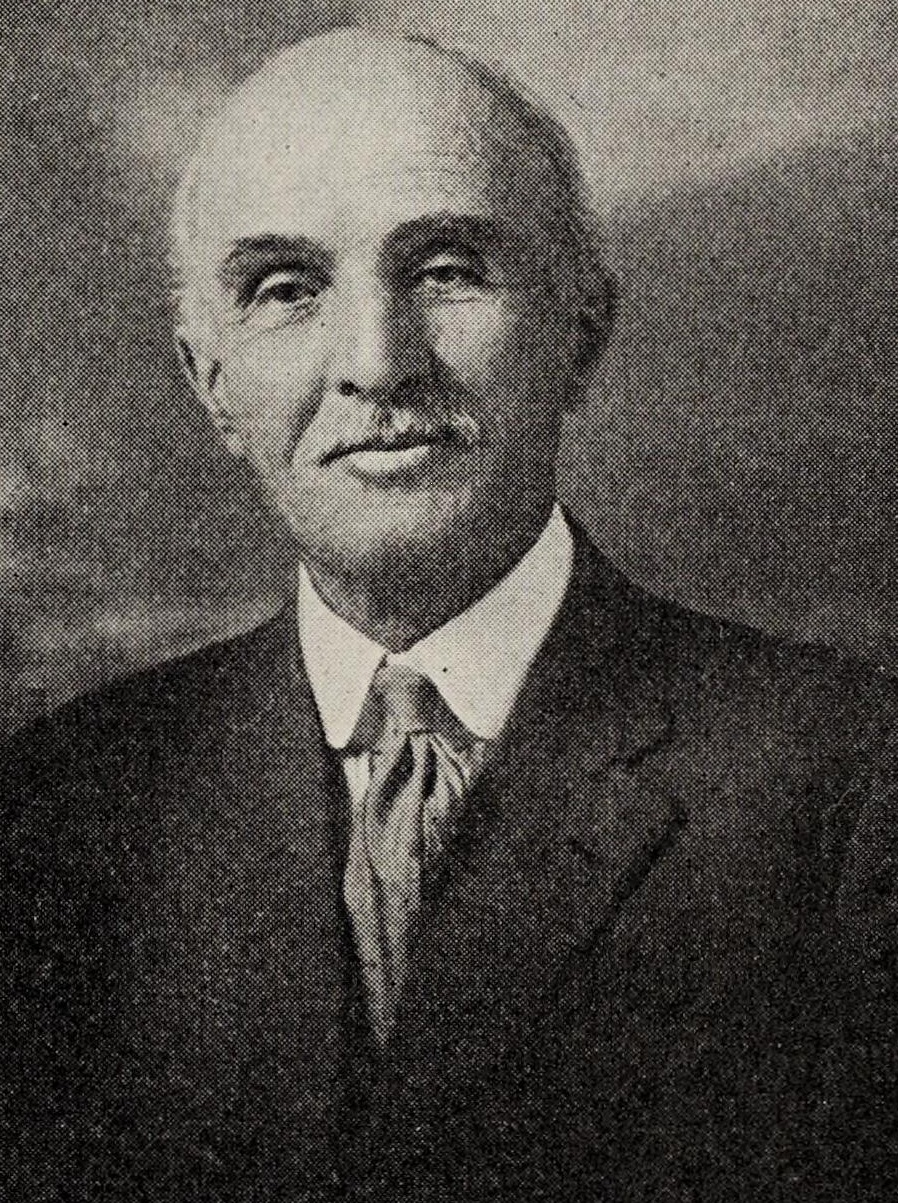

24th Lieutenant Governor of Wisconsin
- In office January 3, 1921 – January 5, 1925
- Governor: John J. Blaine
- Preceded by: Edward Dithmar
- Succeeded by: Henry Huber

Personal details
- Born: March 18, 1849 Greensboro, Vermont, U.S.
- Died: June 10, 1942 (aged 93) Whitehall, Wisconsin, U.S.
- Resting place: Saint Joseph City Cemetery in Saint Joseph, Michigan
- Party: Prohibition Party; Republican Party
- Spouse: Emma Fannie Comings
- Children: 8
- Profession: Dairyman; Agricultural Lecturer; Politician

George Fisher Comings (March 18, 1849 – June 10, 1942) was an American politician, a dairyman, an agricultural lecturer, and the 24th Lieutenant Governor of Wisconsin.

== Early life ==
Comings was born in Greensboro, Vermont, in 1849. He moved to St. Joseph, Michigan, with his parents in 1870. In 1900, he moved to Eau Claire, Wisconsin, where he was a dairyman and bred Holstein cattle.

== Career ==
Comings became well known as a lecturer on agricultural topics, and in 1920, he was elected the 24th Lieutenant Governor of Wisconsin. He served two terms as lieutenant governor, from January 3, 1921, to January 5, 1925. In the 1924 election, he ran for Governor of Wisconsin but lost in the Republican primary to John J. Blaine, the incumbent.

In 1927, Comings began working in the Wisconsin Department of Agriculture, and in 1928 he was made a state humane officer. He held that office until his retirement at age 91 in 1939.

== Death ==
Comings died in 1942 in Whitehall, Wisconsin, and is buried in the Comings plot at the Saint Joseph City Cemetery in Saint Joseph, Michigan.

== Family life ==
Son of Benjamin and Mary Comings, he married Emma Fannie Comings on October 12, 1874. They had eight children, Mary Huntington Ghiringhelli, Alice Tenney Larkin, Ellen Copeland Chambers, Benjamin Comings, Francis Comings, George H. Comings, Willard Comings, and Fannie Comings.

Party political offices
Preceded by Edward Dithmar	Republican nominee for Lieutenant Governor of Wisconsin; 1920, 1922	Succeeded by Henry Huber
Political offices
Preceded by Edward Dithmar	Lieutenant Governor of Wisconsin; 1921–1925	Succeeded by Henry Huber
