= 1920 Swiss referendums =

Five referendums were held in Switzerland during 1920. The first three were held on 21 March on a federal law on regulating employment contracts, a ban on creating gambling establishments and a counterproposal to the ban. The fourth was held on 16 May on membership of the League of Nations (of which Switzerland had become a founding member the previous year), whilst the fifth was held on 31 October on a federal law on working times on railways and other transport services. Three of the five referendums, on the ban on gambling establishments, League of Nations membership and the law on working times, were passed.

== Background ==
The referendum on joining the League of Nations was a mandatory referendum, whilst the ban on gambling establishments was a popular initiative. Together with the counter-proposal, all three required a double majority; a majority of the popular vote and majority of the cantons. The decision of each canton was based on the vote in that canton. Full cantons counted as one vote, whilst half cantons counted as half. The referendums on employment contracts and working times were optional referendums, which required only a majority of the public vote.

Contemporary analyses indicate that support for Swiss membership in the League of Nations was led by the Independent Democratic (Radical) Party, the Liberal Democratic (Protestant Conservative) Party, the anti-Bolshevist Peasants’ Party, the Christian Social Party, and the Griitlianer. Opposition came from Socialists aligned with Bolshevism and a faction of senior Swiss army officers led by Ulrich Wille, while Catholic Conservatives were divided.

== Results ==
=== Federal law on regulating employment contracts ===
Choice	Votes	%
For	254,455	49.8
Against	256,401	50.2
Blank votes	36,755	–
Invalid votes	30,396	–
Total	578,007	100
Registered voters/turnout	957,386	60.3
Source: Nohlen & Stöver

=== Ban on creating gambling establishments ===
Choice	Popular vote		Cantons		
Choice	Votes	%	Full	Half	Total
For	276,021	55.3	13	2	14
Against	223,122	44.7	6	4	8
Blank votes	23,138	–	–	–	–
Invalid votes	45,538	–	–	–	–
Total	567,819	100	19	6	22
Registered voters/turnout	957,386	59.3	–	–	–
Source: Nohlen & Stöver

=== Counterproposal on gambling establishments ===
Choice	Popular vote		Cantons		
Choice	Votes	%	Full	Half	Total
For	122,240	26.1	0	1	0.5
Against	345,327	73.9	19	5	21.5
Blank votes	23,138	–	–	–	–
Invalid votes	45,538	–	–	–	–
Total	536,243	100	19	6	22
Registered voters/turnout	957,386	56.0	–	–	–
Source: Nohlen & Stöver

=== League of Nations membership ===
Choice	Popular vote		Cantons		
Choice	Votes	%	Full	Half	Total
For	416,870	56.3	10	3	11.5
Against	323,719	43.7	9	3	10.5
Blank votes	6,502	–	–	–	–
Invalid votes	4,039	–	–	–	–
Total	751,130	100	19	6	22
Registered voters/turnout	968,327	77.6	–	–	–
Source: Nohlen & Stöver

=== Federal law on working time ===
Choice	Votes	%
For	369,466	57.1
Against	277,342	42.9
Blank votes	8,618	–
Invalid votes	1,487	–
Total	656,913	100
Registered voters/turnout	964,587	68.1
Source: Nohlen & Stöver
