= 1920 Connecticut lieutenant gubernatorial election =

- November 2, 1920
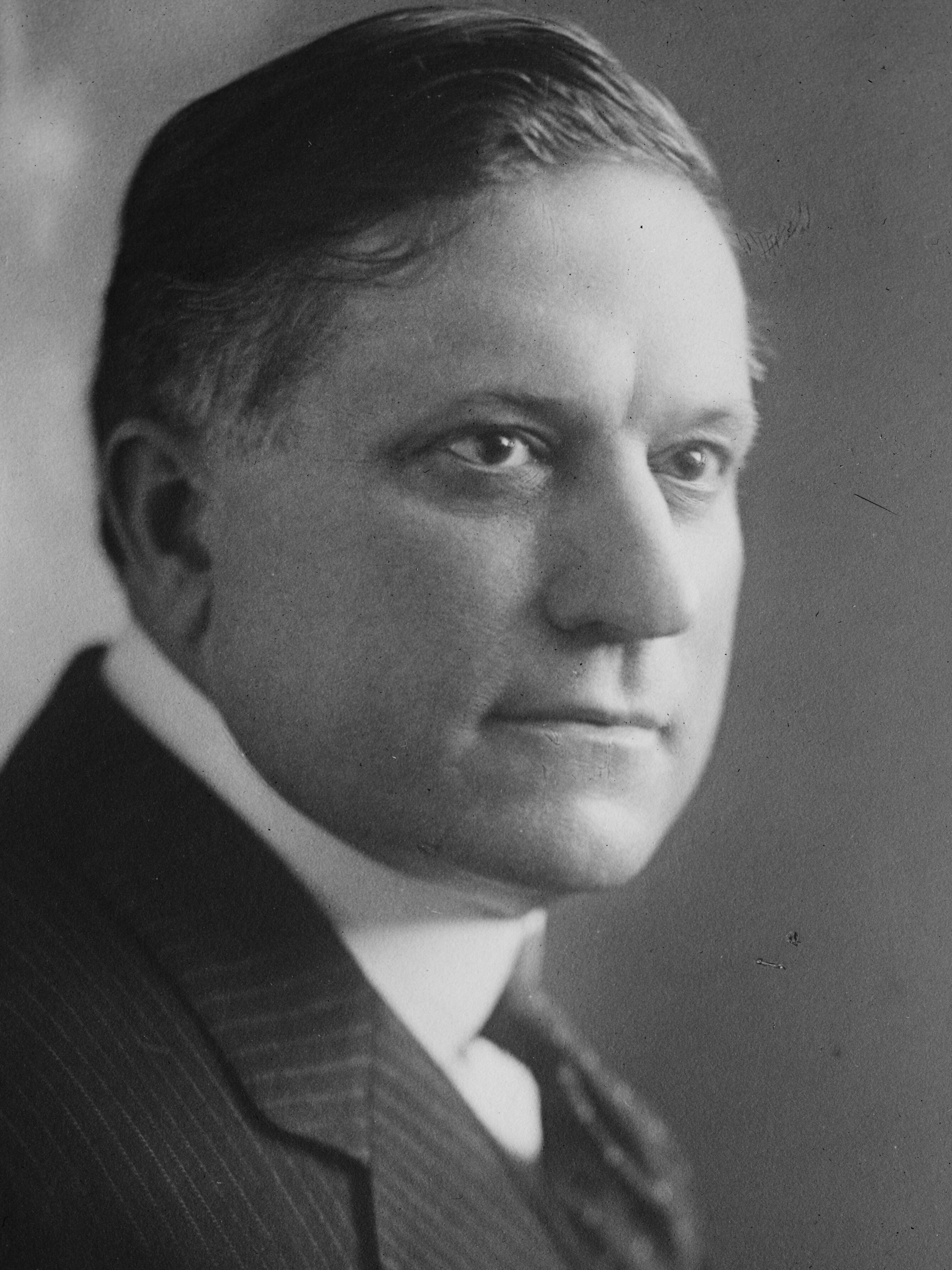

Nominee	Charles A. Templeton	Ernest O. Wagner
Party	Republican	Democratic
Popular vote	229,675	120,359
Percentage	65.60%	34.40%
Lieutenant Governor before election
Clifford B. Wilson
Republican
Elected Lieutenant Governor
Charles A. Templeton
Republican

The 1920 Connecticut lieutenant gubernatorial election was held on November 2, 1920, to elect the lieutenant governor of Connecticut. Republican nominee and incumbent member of the Connecticut Senate Charles A. Templeton won the election against Democratic nominee Ernest O. Wagner.

== General election ==
On election day, November 2, 1920, Republican nominee Charles A. Templeton won the election with 65.60% of the vote, thereby retaining Republican control over the office of lieutenant governor. Templeton was sworn in as the 77th lieutenant governor of Connecticut on January 5, 1921.

=== Results ===
Connecticut lieutenant gubernatorial election, 1920
Party	Candidate	Votes	%
Republican	Charles A. Templeton	229,675	65.60
Democratic	Ernest O. Wagner	120,359	34.40
Total votes		350,034	100.00
Republican hold			
