= August 1920 Danish Landsting election =

Landsting elections were held in Denmark on 10 August 1920, with the exceptions that the seats elected by the resigning parliament were elected on 26 June, the Faroese member was elected on 23 August, and the electors that elected the candidates standing in the constituencies were elected on 30 July.

The seats of all seven constituencies as well as the seats elected by the parliament were up for election.

== Results ==
Party	Seats			
Party	Electors	Parliament	Total	+/–
Venstre	24	7	31	+5
Social Democratic Party	15	4	19	+4
Conservative People's Party	10	4	14	–4
Danish Social Liberal Party	5	3	8	–4
Total	54	18	72	0
Source: Wendt
