= Torger G. Thompson =

American politician

Torger G. Thompson (March 19, 1853 – November 12, 1923) was a member of the Wisconsin State Assembly.

== Biography ==
Thompson was born on March 19, 1853, in Deerfield, Wisconsin or Christiana, Wisconsin, the son of Gulleik Thorstenson Saude and Dønot Torgersdatter Røthe. He was an active member of his local Lutheran church. He married Alice Musifin in 1883. He died at his farm in Deerfield in 1923.

== Career ==
Thompson was elected to the Assembly in 1902. In addition, he served as a town chairman. He was a Republican. In 1902-05, Thompson filed for patents in several countries about his marine propeller design that would imitate fish tails.

== Legacy ==
Upon his death, Thompson left an estate worth $500,000. The bulk of the estate, $300,000, was willed to the University of Wisconsin for the Thompson Chair of Scandinavian Languages to assist Scandinavian students. Smaller amounts were willed to St. Olaf College in Northfield, Minnesota, to create the Torger G. Thompson Fund, and to the Norwegian Lutheran Church of America, the Martin Luther Orphan Home at Stoughton, Wisconsin, and the Homme Orphan Home at Wittenberg, Wisconsin.

== See also ==
- The Political Graveyard
