= American Party (1919) =

- Leader: James E. Ferguson; W. P. Sebastian
- Founded: 1919; 107 years ago
- Dissolved: 1922; 104 years ago
- Preceded by: Democratic Party
- Merged into: Democratic Party; Republican Party (minority)
- Ideology: Anti-prohibitionism; Isolationism; Populism

The American Party was a short-lived political party serving primarily as a personal vehicle of former Texas Governor James "Pa" Ferguson that existed from 1919 to 1922.

== Formation ==
On August 14, 1919, Ferguson and a splinter group of Texas Democrats left the Democratic Party to form the American Party in response to efforts by Texas Democrats to strong-arm Ferguson off the primary ballot. Former State Senator William Petit Sebastian of Breckenridge was named the chairman of the new party at an organizing meeting in December 1919.

== 1920 election ==
In the 1920 presidential election, the American Party nominated Ferguson as its candidate for President and William J. Hough of New York as its candidate for Vice President. Initially, Ferguson and Hough had national aspirations, but ultimately only ended up on the ballot in Texas. Ferguson put forward a platform that opposed the League of Nations and votes for women, but also included a number of progressive proposals such as government loans to small farmers, “living wages” for labor, and generous pensions for disabled soldiers.

In that year's gubernatorial election, the party nominated Temple H. McGregor, a former member of the Texas Senate. The nominees for the remainder of the statewide slate were: J.W. Green of Montgomery County for Lieutenant Governor, B. D. Dshiel of Jacksonville for Attorney General, Joe A Broad of Hill County for Treasurer, Herbert A. Smith of Bell County for Railroad Commissioner, W. B. Riley of Hardeman County for Land Commissioner, William Blakeslee of Travis County for Comptroller, Fisher Alsup of Bell County for Superintendent, and H.B. Short for Associate Justice.

Ferguson's platform included opposition to the League of Nations, opposition to a national prohibition of alcohol, and a full pardon to Eugene V. Debs. Ferguson sought the support of Warren Harding and the Republican Party to convince its voters to vote for the American Party ticket and unite the anti-Democratic vote in Texas. The 1920 presidential election was won by Republican Party candidate Warren Harding. The Democratic nominee James M. Cox won in Texas, where the White majority voted solidly Democratic. Nationally, Ferguson was also surpassed by three other unsuccessful candidates:

- Eugene Victor Debs of the Socialist Party of America.
- Parley Parker Christensen of the United States Farmer–Labor Party.
- Aaron Sherman Watkins of the United States Prohibition Party.

== Post-election and dissolution ==
Ferguson received 47,968 votes (9.9% of the vote in Texas, 0.2% nationwide). McGregor outpolled Ferguson, earning 69,380 votes (14.4%) in the concurrent four-way gubernatorial race. Though Ferguson and McGregor were unsuccessful in their respective candidacies, four candidates of the American Party won election to the Texas House of Representatives. They were Walter J. Kveton of Sealy, Otto F. Menking of Fayetteville, Henry Julius Neinast of Burton, and John Henry Wessels of La Grange.

Shortly after the start of the 37th Legislature, Nienast was expelled from the House for anti-draft actions in World War I.

On January 28, 1922, Ferguson dissolved the American Party in order to run for the Democratic nomination for U.S. Senate in the 1922 election. Kveton and Wessels joined the Republican Party with Wessels winning reelection to the Texas House of Representatives and Kveton losing to Democratic Congressman James P. Buchanan in Texas's 10th congressional district. In 1924, a pro-KKK American Party, unrelated to the anti-KKK Ferguson's American Party, ran Gilbert Nations for President in that year's presidential election.
