= May 1920 Bolivian legislative election =

Parliamentary elections were held in Bolivia in May 1920 to elect half the seats of the Chamber of Deputies and one-third of the seats in the Senate. The new National Congress was due to open on 6 August but was dissolved on 12 July following a coup-d'état.
