= Edward Dithmar =

American politician, 23rd Lieutenant Governor of Wisconsin (1873–1938)

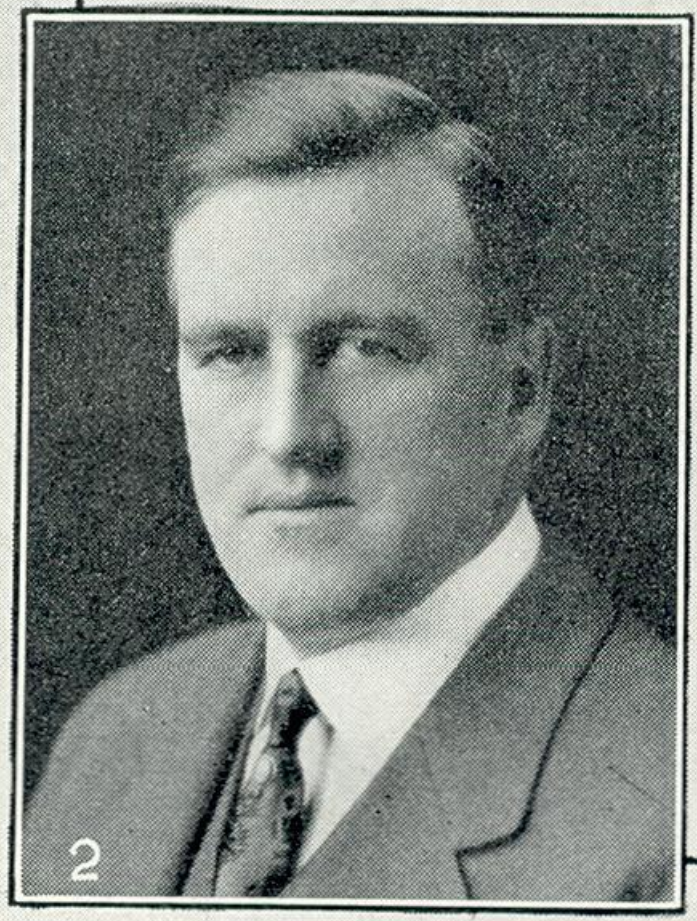

23rd Lieutenant Governor of Wisconsin
- In office January 4, 1915 – January 3, 1921
- Governor: Emanuel Philipp
- Preceded by: Thomas Morris
- Succeeded by: George Comings

Personal details
- Born: Edward Dithmar; January 31, 1873 Reedsburg, Wisconsin, U.S.
- Died: September 22, 1938 (aged 65) Baraboo, Wisconsin, U.S.
- Party: Republican
- Spouse: Emily A. (Upham) Dithmar
- Children: 3
- Education: University of Wisconsin–Madison
- Profession: Lawyer; Politician

Edward Frederick Dithmar (January 31, 1873 – September 22, 1938) was an American lawyer and politician from Wisconsin. He served as the 23rd Lieutenant Governor of Wisconsin.

== Early life ==
Dithmar was born in Reedsburg, Wisconsin in 1873, the son of Rudolph E. Dithmar and Fredericka (Dargel) Dithmar. He attended Reedsburg Area High School and graduated from the University of Wisconsin in 1894. He studied law and was admitted to the bar in 1899. He began the practice of law in Baraboo.

== Political career ==
He held many political positions in Wisconsin, and began his political career as a messenger in the Wisconsin State Assembly in 1889. Dithmar served as a court clerk in Sauk County from 1894 until 1900, and as register of probate in Baraboo. He was chairman of the Sauk County Republican committee for four years and served as vice-chairman of the Wisconsin State Central Committee during the 1910 campaign. He served as the 23rd Lieutenant Governor of Wisconsin for three terms, from 1915 until 1921, under Governor Emanuel L. Philipp. He ran for the United States Senate in 1925 and for Governor of Wisconsin in 1920; he was unsuccessful in both elections.

He died in 1938 in Baraboo, Wisconsin.

== Family life ==
Dithmar married Emily A. Upham in 1910. They had two children, Edward Upham Dithmar and John Upham Dithmar. They had a third child, Mary Eleanor Dithmar, in 1921.

Party political offices
| Preceded by Thomas Morris | Republican nominee for Lieutenant Governor of Wisconsin; 1914, 1916, 1918 | Succeeded by George Comings |
Political offices
| Preceded by Thomas Morris | Lieutenant Governor of Wisconsin; 1915–1921 | Succeeded by George Comings |
