= List of elections in 1922 =

The following elections occurred in the year 1922.

== Africa ==
- 1922 Southern Rhodesian government referendum

== Asia ==
- 1922 Hong Kong sanitary board election
- 1922 Philippine House of Representatives elections
- 1922 Philippine Senate elections
- 1922 Philippine legislative election
- 1922 Soviet Union legislative election

== Europe ==
- 1922 Dutch general election
- 1922 Finnish parliamentary election
- Hungarian parliamentary election
- 1922 Icelandic parliamentary election
- 1922 Irish general election
- 1922 Latvian presidential election
- 1922 Liechtenstein general election
- 1922 Lithuanian parliamentary election
- 1922 Republic of Central Lithuania general election
- 1922 Luxembourg general election
- 1922 Monegasque general election
- 1922 Norwegian local elections
- 1922 Polish legislative election
- 1922 Polish presidential elections
- 1922 Portuguese legislative election
- 1922 Romanian general election
- 1922 Soviet Union legislative election
- 1922 Swedish prohibition referendum
- 1922 Swiss federal election
- 1922 Swiss referendums
- 1922 conclave

=== United Kingdom ===
- 1922 United Kingdom general election
  - England: general election in England
  - Scotland: general election in Scotland
  - Wales: general election in Wales
  - Northern Ireland: general election in Northern Ireland
  - List of MPs elected in the 1922 United Kingdom general election
  - 1922 Labour Party leadership election (UK)
- 1922 Banbury by-election
- 1922 Bodmin by-election
- 1922 Camberwell North by-election
- 1922 Cambridge by-election
- 1922 Chertsey by-election
- 1922 City of London by-election
- 1922 Clapham by-election
- 1922 Gower by-election
- 1922 Inverness by-election
- 1922 Leicester East by-election
- 1922 Liverpool Exchange by-election
- 1922 Ludlow by-election
- 1922 Manchester Clayton by-election
- 1922 Moray and Nairn by-election
- 1922 Newbury by-election
- 1922 Newport by-election
- 1922 North Londonderry by-election
- 1922 Nottingham East by-election
- 1922 Pontypridd by-election
- 1922 Portsmouth South by-election
- 1922 South Londonderry by-election
- 1922 Tamworth by-election
- 1922 West Down by-election
- 1922 Wolverhampton West by-election

== Americas ==
=== Canada ===
- 1922 Edmonton municipal election
- 1922 Manitoba general election
- 1922 Toronto municipal election
- 1922 Yukon general election

=== United States ===
- 1922 New York state election
- 1922 United States elections

==== United States lieutenant gubernatorial ====
- 1922 California lieutenant gubernatorial election
- 1922 Connecticut lieutenant gubernatorial election
- 1922 Minnesota lieutenant gubernatorial election
- 1922 Nebraska lieutenant gubernatorial election
- 1922 Texas lieutenant gubernatorial election
- 1922 Wisconsin lieutenant gubernatorial election

==== United States gubernatorial ====
- 1922 Alabama gubernatorial election
- 1922 Arizona gubernatorial election
- 1922 Arkansas gubernatorial election
- 1922 California gubernatorial election
- 1922 Colorado gubernatorial election
- 1922 Connecticut gubernatorial election
- 1922 Georgia gubernatorial election
- 1922 Idaho gubernatorial election
- 1922 Iowa gubernatorial election
- 1922 Kansas gubernatorial election
- 1922 Maine gubernatorial election
- 1922 Massachusetts gubernatorial election
- 1922 Michigan gubernatorial election
- 1922 Minnesota gubernatorial election
- 1922 Nebraska gubernatorial election
- 1922 Nevada gubernatorial election
- 1922 New Hampshire gubernatorial election
- 1922 New Jersey gubernatorial election
- 1922 New Mexico gubernatorial election
- 1922 New York gubernatorial election
- 1922 North Dakota gubernatorial election
- 1922 Ohio gubernatorial election
- 1922 Oklahoma gubernatorial election
- 1922 Oregon gubernatorial election
- 1922 Pennsylvania gubernatorial election
- 1922 Rhode Island gubernatorial election
- 1922 South Carolina gubernatorial election
- 1922 South Dakota gubernatorial election
- 1922 Tennessee gubernatorial election
- 1922 Texas gubernatorial election
- 1922 United States gubernatorial elections
- 1922 Vermont gubernatorial election
- 1922 Wisconsin gubernatorial election
- 1922 Wyoming gubernatorial election

==== United States House of Representatives ====
- 1922 United States House of Representatives elections
- 1922 United States House of Representatives election in Arizona
- 1922 United States House of Representatives elections in California
- 1922 United States House of Representatives elections in South Carolina

==== United States Senate ====
- 1922 United States Senate elections
- 1922 United States Senate election in Arizona
- 1922 United States Senate election in California
- 1922 United States Senate election in Connecticut
- 1922 United States Senate election in Delaware
- 1922 United States Senate election in Florida
- 1922 United States Senate election in Indiana
- 1922 United States Senate special election in Iowa
- 1922 United States Senate election in Maine
- 1922 United States Senate election in Maryland
- 1922 United States Senate election in Massachusetts
- 1922 United States Senate election in Michigan
- 1922 United States Senate election in Minnesota
- 1922 United States Senate election in Mississippi
- 1922 United States Senate election in Missouri
- 1922 United States Senate election in Montana
- 1922 United States Senate election in Nebraska
- 1922 United States Senate election in New Jersey
- 1922 United States Senate election in New York
- 1922 United States Senate election in North Dakota
- 1922 United States Senate election in Ohio
- 1922 United States Senate elections in Pennsylvania
- 1922 United States Senate special election in Pennsylvania
- 1922 United States Senate election in Tennessee
- 1922 United States Senate election in Texas
- 1922 United States Senate election in Vermont
- 1922 United States Senate election in Virginia
- 1922 United States Senate election in Washington
- 1922 United States Senate election in Wisconsin
- 1922 United States Senate election in Wyoming

=== South America ===
- 1922 Argentine general election
- 1922 Brazilian presidential election
- 1922 Colombian presidential election
- 1922 Guatemalan presidential election
- 1922 Honduran legislative election
- 1922 Nicaraguan parliamentary election
- 1922 Uruguayan general election

== Oceania ==
=== Australia ===
- 1922 Australian Senate election
- 1922 Australian federal election
- 1922 Tasmanian state election
- 1922 Yarra by-election

=== New Zealand ===
- 1922 New Zealand general election
- 1922 Dunedin North by-election
- 1922 Southern Maori by-election

== See also ==
- Category:1922 elections
