= May 1914 =

Month of 1914

<<	May 1914					>>
Su	Mo	Tu	We	Th	Fr	Sa
					1	2
3	4	5	6	7	8	9
10	11	12	13	14	15	16
17	18	19	20	21	22	23
24	25	26	27	28	29	30
31

The following events occurred in May 1914:

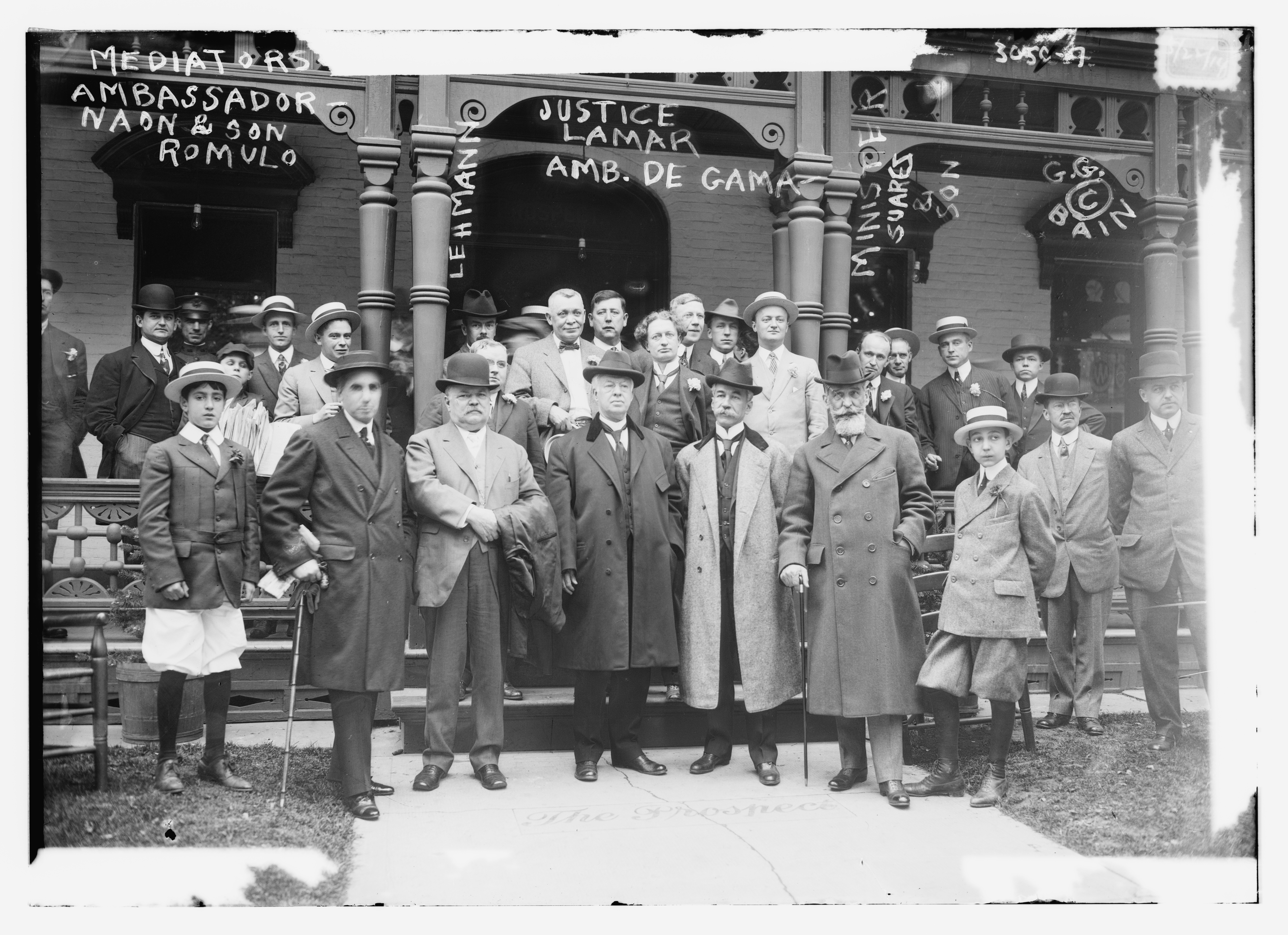
Delegates at the Niagara Falls peace conference in Niagara Falls, Ontario, May 20, 1914

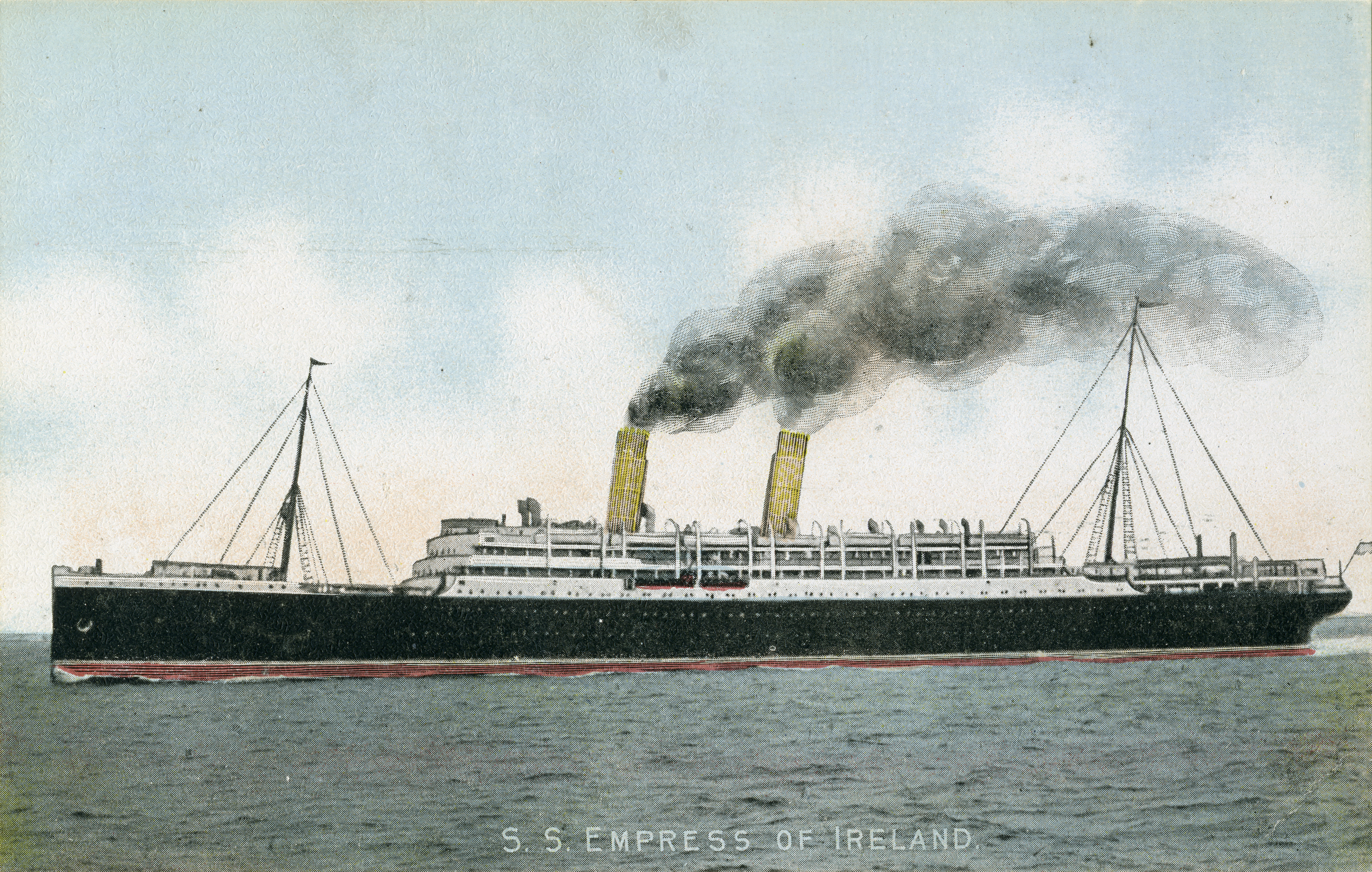
Empress of Ireland, sank on May 29, 1914, in the Gulf of St. Lawrence with over 1,000 passengers and crew lost.

== May 1, 1914 (Friday) ==
- The Exposition Internationale (World's Fair) was held in the French city of Lyon.
- P. W. Goldring was elected to the Sanitary Board of Hong Kong in a by-election for one of the two unofficial seats, beating rival William Leonard Carter by a landslide of 144–33 votes.
- The German coast vessel SS Dollart struck the wreck of SS Werner in the River Elbe at Glückstadt, Germany and sank with the loss of two crew, but was later recovered and put back into service.
- The No. 7 air squadron was formed at Farnborough Airport in Farnborough, Hampshire, England, the last British air squadron formed before the outbreak of World War I.
- Tojo Railway opened the Tōbu Tōjō Line between Ikebukuro and Tanomosawa, Japan, with stations Hizaori, Kami-Fukuoka, Kawagoe-mach, Narimasu, Shiki, Shimo-Itabashi, and Tsuruse serving the line.
- The North Auckland Railroad opened new stations along the Okaihau Branch in Otiria, New Zealand, including Cameron's Crossing, Kaikohe, and Lake Omapere Road Crossing.
- Socialist politician Job Harriman established the Llano del Rio commune in California to demonstrate a working community of cooperative and collective economic activity that would build public support for socialism. The number of residents at the colony grew from five at inception to 150 by next year.
- The borough West Paterson, New Jersey (now Woodland Park) was incorporated.
- The Stevens Building opened in downtown Portland, Oregon, and is now listed on the National Register of Historic Places. It is approximately 152 feet (46 m) tall.
- The Croatian association football club Victoria was formed in Zagreb. It was renamed in 1945 to Lokomotiva at the beginning of a very successful decade for the club, and still operates in present-day Croatia.
- Born: John Henry Lewis, American boxer, World Light Heavyweight Champion from 1935 to 1938; in Phoenix, Arizona, United States (d. 1974)

== May 2, 1914 (Saturday) ==
- The Welsh bus line South Wales Transport began operating in Swansea, Wales.
- The Caldwell Carnegie Library opened in Caldwell, Idaho thanks to funding from the Carnegie library foundation.
- The 25th County Championship first-class cricket competition began, with the schedule originally set to run until September 9. The start of World War I forced the championship committee to cancel the last two matches of the season, but final positions in the table being calculated by the percentage of possible points gained allowed the Surrey County Cricket Club to be declared season champions for the seventh time.
- Born:
  - Mary von Schrader Jarrell, American patron of the arts, worked to preserve the works of husband poet Randall Jarrell; as Mary von Schrader, in St. Louis, United States (d. 2007)
  - Herbert Lewis Hardwick, Puerto Rican boxer, two-timer winner of the World Colored Welterweight Championship in 1936 and 1943; in Mayagüez, Puerto Rico (d. 1966)
- Died: John Campbell, British noble, husband of Princess Louise of the United Kingdom, 4th Governor General of Canada (b. 1845)

== May 3, 1914 (Sunday) ==
- Komagata Maru incident — The Japanese steamship SS Komagata Maru left Yokohama, Japan for Canada with 376 passengers from Punjab, British India.
- Following a scoreless final on April 19, the American Cup association football final was replayed in Newark, New Jersey before a crowd of 15,000 spectators. Forward Edward Donaghy of Bethlehem Steel scored the single winning goal against Tacony.
- Born:
  - Ernest Smith, Canadian soldier, member of the 1st Canadian Division during World War II, recipient of the Victoria Cross for action during the Italian campaign; in New Westminster, British Columbia, Canada (d. 2005)
  - Reg Bentley, Canadian hockey player, brother to hockey players Doug Bentley and Max Bentley, played left wing for the Chicago Blackhawks from 1941 to 1949; as Reginald Bentley, in Delisle, Saskatchewan, Canada (d. 1980)
- Died:
  - Élisabeth Leseur, French mystic, best known for the spiritual diary published as Journal et pensées pour chaque jour (Journal and thoughts for each day) by her husband Felix after she posthumously predicted he would convert to Christianity from atheism and become an ordained priest in 1923 (b. 1866)
  - Daniel Sickles, American politician and diplomat, U.S. Representative from New York from 1857 to 1861 and 1893 to 1895, United States Ambassador to Spain from 1869 to 1874 (b. 1819)

== May 4, 1914 (Monday) ==
- Mexican Revolution – Mexican revolutionary leader Álvaro Obregón began a blockade around Mazatlán that lasted two months.
- More than 50 people were killed and over 100 injured in a fire that swept the commercial section of Valparaíso, Chile.
- Suffragette Mary Ann Aldham slashed a portrait of Henry James by painter John Singer Sargent at the Royal Academy Summer Exhibition in London with a meat cleaver, the first of three attacks staged by suffragists over the month.
- The Portuguese football association club Tomar was formed in Tomar, Portugal.
- Charlie Chaplin made his directorial debut with the comedy Caught in the Rain, one of his films where he did not star as The Tramp.
- Born:
  - Maedayama Eigorō, Japanese sumo wrestler, 39th yokozuna (champion) from 1947 to 1949; as Hagimori Kanematsu, in Ehime Prefecture, Empire of Japan (present-day Japan) (d. 1971)
  - Murtada Sharif 'Askari, Iraqi-Iranian Islamic scholar, author of more than 50 books on the history of Islam; in Samarra, Iraq (d. 2007)
  - Mark Fradkin, Soviet composer, recipient of the People's Artist of the USSR; in Vitebsk, Russian Empire (present-day Belarus) (d. 1990)

== May 5, 1914 (Tuesday) ==
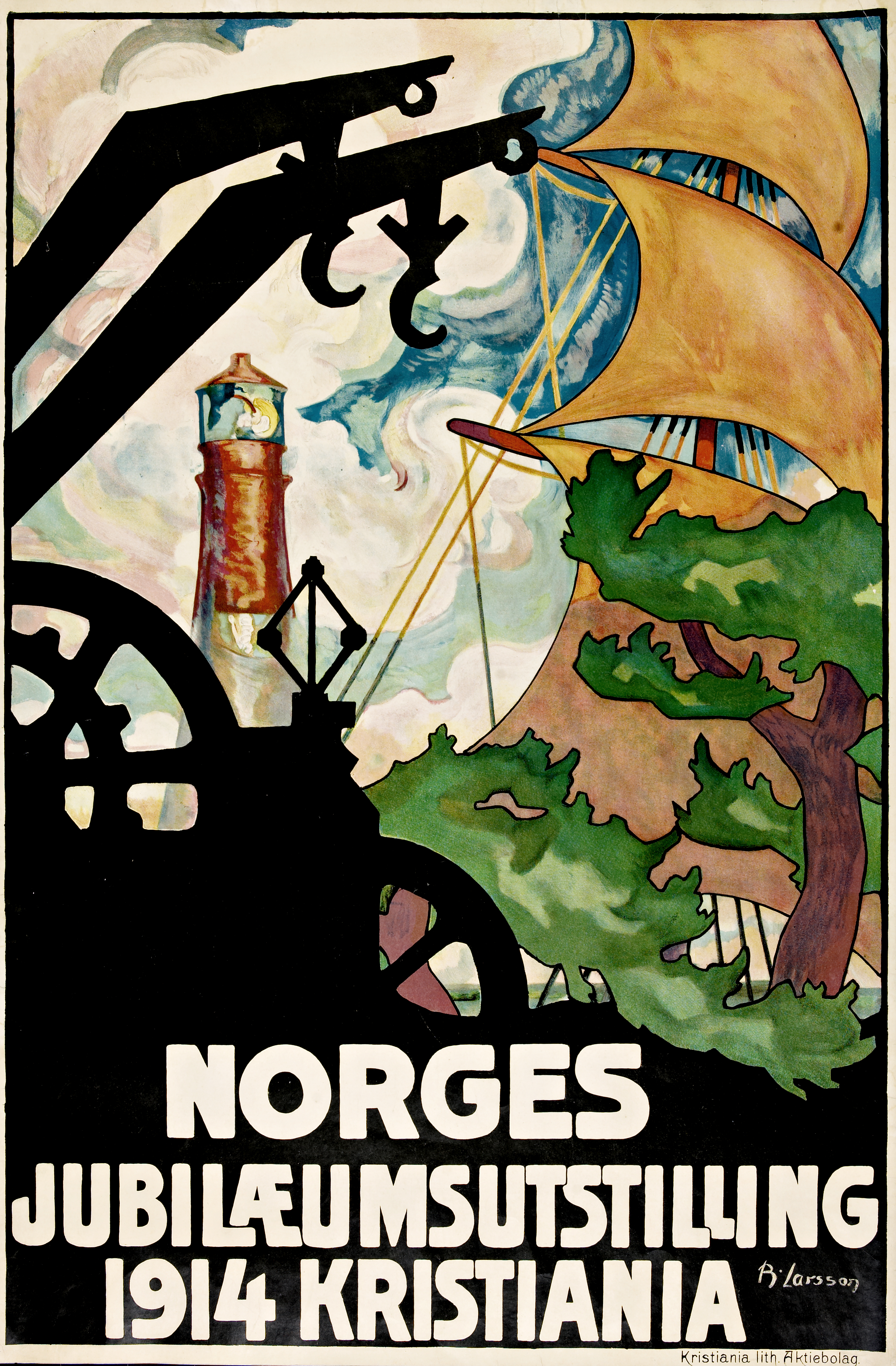
Poster of 1914 Jubilee Exhibition

- The Jubilee Exhibition was held in Kristiania, Norway to mark the centennial of the country's Constitution.
- A brush fire near Panama City ignited a powder magazine depot for the Panama Canal project, killing seven firefighters and officers trying to contain the blaze and injuring 20 more in a massive explosion.
- The St. Petersburg–Tampa Airboat Line ceased making flights between St. Petersburg and Tampa, Florida after contracts were terminated. In its five months of operation, the airline covered over 7,000 miles, completed 172 flights, and carried 1,205 passengers.
- Athletic director L. Theo Bellmont of University of Texas at Austin chaired the first organizational meeting of the Southwest Conference in Dallas, with representatives from eight colleges with athletic programs in attendance.
- The borough of Clarks Green, Pennsylvania was established.
- Born:
  - Tyrone Power, American actor, best known for swashbuckler film roles such as The Mark of Zorro; in Cincinnati, Ohio, United States (d. 1958)
  - Lloyd Trigg, New Zealand air force officer, member of the No. 200 Squadron during World War II, recipient of the Victoria Cross for action during the Battle of the Atlantic; in Houhora, New Zealand (killed in action, 1943)

== May 6, 1914 (Wednesday) ==
- The British House of Lords rejected the Women's Suffrage bill 104 to 60.
- The Bishop's Stortford Tournament was held in Hertfordshire, England, with George Duncan winning the golf tournament with rounds of 72 and 69, two shots ahead of Harry Vardon who had rounds of 72 and 71. It was the only tournament played at the Bishop's Stortford Golf Club before the onset of World War I.
- Anglican bishop Thomas Sprott consecrated the altar at All Saints' Church in Palmerston North, New Zealand but not the entire church as policy indicated parishes with outstanding debt could not receive dedication even if the building was completed. State intervention relieved the parish of its debt and the church was formally dedicated on October 29, 1916.
- Born: Randall Jarrell, American poet, 11th United States Poet Laureate to the Library of Congress; in Nashville, Tennessee, United States (killed in car accident, 1965)

== May 7, 1914 (Thursday) ==
- Toole County, Montana was established with its county seat in Shelby.
- Born:
  - Scobie Breasley, Australian jockey, winner of the Prix de l'Arc de Triomphe; as Arthur Edward Breasley, in Wagga Wagga, Australia (d. 2006)
  - Johannes de Groot, Dutch mathematician, lead researcher in topology; in Loppersum, Netherlands (d. 1972)
  - Ye Fei, Chinese-Filipino naval officer, commander of the People's Liberation Army Navy from 1980 to 1982; as Sixto Mercado Tiongo, in Tiaong, Philippine Islands (present-day Philippines) (b. 1999)

== May 8, 1914 (Friday) ==
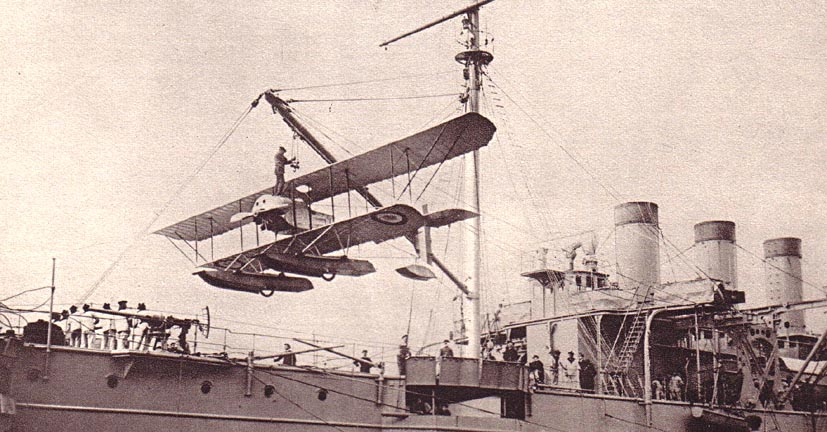
A Caudron seaplane, being craned on La Foudre in April 1914, the first ship to be transformed into a seaplane-carrier

- A magnitude 4.9 earthquake struck near the town of Giarre, Province of Catania, Italy, causing 120 deaths and destroying 223 homes, an unusually high death toll for a small magnitude event.
- The Smith-Lever Act went into effect, allowing a national Cooperative Extension Service to be established, which allowed university agricultural departments to offer rural Americans educational programs that introduced new agricultural practices and technology.
- Paramount Pictures was formed through a partnership between the Famous Players Film Company and the Lasky Feature Play Company. It still remains the oldest operating movie studio in Hollywood.
- The Kentucky Academy of Science was formed by a group of 46 Kentucky scientists and interested laypersons, as an organization that "encourages scientific research, promotes the diffusion of scientific knowledge, and unifies the scientific interests of the Commonwealth of Kentucky." The organization presently has 700 active members.
- French aviator René Caudron made the first French shipboard takeoff in an airplane from a ramp constructed over the fore-deck of the seaplane tender Foudre, using a Caudron G.3 amphibian floatplane.
- The association football club National was formed in Concón, Chile.
- Born: Romain Gary, Russian-French writer and diplomat, author of The Roots of Heaven and Clair de femme; as Roman Kacew, in Vilnius, Russian Empire (present-day Lithuania) (d. 1980)
- Died: Seth Edulji Dinshaw, Pakistani philanthropist, founded the Lady Dufferin Hospital in Karachi as well as funded other major education and public works projects still operating in modern-day Pakistan (b. 1842)

== May 9, 1914 (Saturday) ==
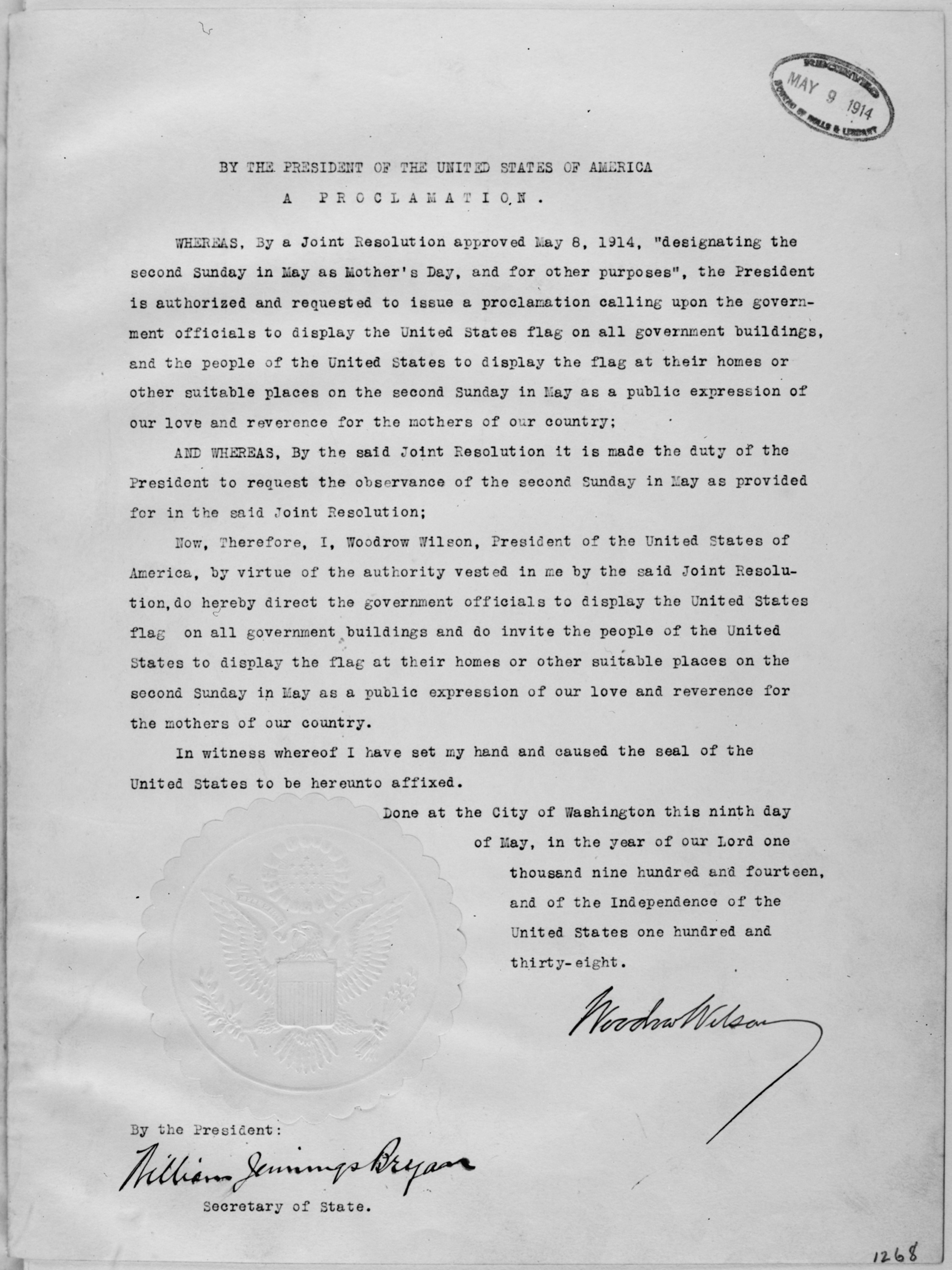
President Wilson's Mother's Day Proclamation of May 9, 1914

- U.S. President Woodrow Wilson issued a proclamation declaring the first national Mother's Day as a day for American citizens to show the flag in honor of those mothers whose sons had died in war. The United States Congress passed a law a day earlier designating the second Sunday in May as Mother's Day.
- American thoroughbred Old Rosebud won the 40th running of the Kentucky Derby by eight lengths in a time of 2:03 2/5, setting a record that would not be broken for 16 years.
- Andrew Anderson began charging passengers for 15 cents per fare for travel from the mining town of Hibbing to Alice, Minnesota using a seven-seat Hupmobile. Local businessman Carl Eric Wickman bought in to the business, and helped start a bus line service that grew to become the Greyhound Bus Line in 1929.
- After months of illness, Post Foods founder C. W. Post took his own life by shooting himself with a rifle at his home in Santa Barbara, California. His 27-year-old daughter, Marjorie Merriweather Post, inherited the company along with much of her father's vast fortune, considered one of the largest at that time.
- Cricketer J. T. Hearne became the first bowler to take 3,000 first-class wickets.
- Born:
  - Hank Snow, Canadian country musician, author of country hits "I'm Movin' On" and "The Golden Rocket"; as Clarence Eugene Snow, in Brooklyn, Queens County, Nova Scotia, Canada (d. 1999)
  - Carlo Maria Giulini, Italian conductor, conducted for the Chicago Symphony Orchestra, London's Philharmonia Orchestra, and the Vienna Philharmonic; in Barletta, Kingdom of Italy (present-day Italy) (d. 2005)
  - Theodore W. Kheel, American attorney, mediator in the New York newspaper strike; in New York City, United States (d. 2010)
- Died:
  - Blackburn B. Dovener, U.S. Representative for West Virginia from 1894 to 1907 (b. 1842)
  - William John Sutton, Canadian industrialist, developed the timber industry and mining industry on Vancouver Island, British Columbia (b. 1859)
  - Arthur Cumming, British figure skater, silver medalist in the 1908 Summer Olympics (died from injuries in a motorcycle accident) (b. 1889)
  - Edgar Humann, French naval officer, Chief of Staff of the French Navy from 1894 to 1895 (b. 1838)

== May 10, 1914 (Sunday) ==
- General elections were completed in France, with the center-left Radical Party winning a plurality with nearly 35 percent of the popular vote and 195 of the 601 seats in the French legislative assembly.
- Canadian Arctic Expedition – Robert Bartlett, captain of the shipwrecked Karluk left fellow Intuit guide Kataktovik in Emma Town, Siberia and traveled with a Russian escort for a week's journey to Emma Harbour, where he could secure passage back to Alaska and organize a rescue for the remaining Arctic expedition members on Wrangel Island.
- The Rūta Society premiered its last play - The Snow by Stanisław Przybyszewski - in Vilnius, Lithuania. The outbreak of World War I prevented the cultural society from organizing any future theatrical or musical productions and led to its being dissolved.
- The monthly French newspaper Le Pays de France published its first issue to promote tourism in France. The paper was halted for two months with the outbreak of World War I before resuming as a weekly paper chronicling the battles and events of the war.
- The 14th Copa del Rey was played at the Estadio de Costorbe in Irun, Spain, with Athletic Bilbao beating España de Barcelona 2–1 to become champions for the fifth time ever.
- Born:
  - Charles McGraw, American film actor, best known for tough guy roles such The Killers; as Charles Crisp Butters, in Des Moines, Iowa, United States (d. 1980)
  - Gerard Louis Frey, American clergy, bishop of the Roman Catholic Diocese of Savannah, Georgia from 1967 to 1972 and the Roman Catholic Diocese of Lafayette in Louisiana, from 1972 to 1989; in New Orleans, United States (d. 2007)
- Died:
  - Lillian Nordica, American opera singer, performed Brunhild in the Ring Cycle and other famous operas (b. 1857)
  - Ernst von Schuch, Austrian conductor, famously collaborated with composer Richard Strauss at the Dresden Court Opera (b. 1846)

== May 11, 1914 (Monday) ==
- A national tribute was held in New York City for the U.S. servicemen killed at Veracruz, Mexico in the battles leading to the United States occupation of Veracruz.
- King Alfonso and his consort Queen Victoria Eugenie attended the ceremonial opening of the Church of La Concepción in Madrid.
- The Serbian Olympic Cup was played in Belgrade, with Velika Srbija defeating Šumadija Kragujevac 3–1. Footballer Alois Machek scored two of the winning goals.
- The crime drama film The Master Mind was released, directed by Oscar Apfel and Cecil B. DeMille and starring Edmund Breese. Based on the play of the same name by Daniel D. Carter, the film's plot revolves around a defense attorney's attempts to avenge the wrongful conviction of an innocent man.
- Born: Ismail Marzuki, Indonesian composer, known for popular patriotic songs for Indonesia including "Halo, Halo Bandung", "Gugur Bunga", and "Rayuan Pulau Kelapa", in Batavia, Dutch East Indies (present-day Jakarta, Indonesia) (d. 1958)
- Died:
  - John C. C. Mayo, American business leader, developer of the coal mining industry in Kentucky and Virginia (b. 1864)
  - Daniel De Leon, American activist, known for promoting industrial unionism in the United States (b. 1852)

== May 12, 1914 (Tuesday) ==
- Suffragist Gertrude Mary Ansell damaged a portrait of the Duke of Wellington by recently deceased painter Hubert von Herkomer while it was displayed at the Royal Academy Summer Exhibition in London, the second such attack.
- Pope Pius X established the Territorial Prelature of Registro do Araguaia in Brazil, later the Catholic Diocese of Guiratinga.
- The Jacksonville Zoo and Gardens was opened in Jacksonville, Florida with a red deer fawn as the first exhibit.
- Born:
  - Howard K. Smith, American journalist, one of the original Edward R. Murrow Boys at CBS; in Ferriday, Louisiana, United States (d. 2002)
  - Joy Batchelor, English animator, co-founder of the animated production company Halas and Batchelor with husband John Halas, best known for the animated version of George Orwell's Animal Farm; in Watford, England (d. 1991)

== May 13, 1914 (Wednesday) ==
- Seventeen British sailors drowned in separate sinkings on the same day. The steamer collier Turret Hill capsized in the North Sea after its cargo load shifted, with 12 men perishing, while a steamer in the English Channel struck a pilot boat and sank it, drowning another five sailors.
- Joe Benz pitched a no-hitter in a 6-1 Chicago White Sox victory over the Cleveland Naps.
- Born: Joe Louis, American boxer, World Heavyweight Champion from 1937 to 1949; as Joseph Louis Barrow, in LaFayette, Alabama, United States (d. 1981)

== May 14, 1914 (Thursday) ==
- U.S. President Woodrow Wilson signed the proclamation creating Mother's Day, the second Sunday in May, as a national holiday to honor mothers.
- The Anglo-American Exhibition opened at Shepherd's Bush, London, one of the last exhibitions of its kind to be held in that area.
- Royal Navy cruiser HMS Galatea was launched at the William Beardmore and Company shipyard in Glasgow, becoming one of the most decorated naval ships in World War I.
- British aviator Norman Spratt set a British altitude record of 18,900 ft while flying a Royal aircraft.
- The new Rochester Bridge opened to traffic across the River Medway in Rochester, Kent, England.
- The final Sphere and Tatler Foursomes Tournament was played at the Sunningdale Golf Club in Sunningdale, England, with England's golfers Len Holland and James Batley beating Scotland's C. McIntosh and George Smith by a 5 and 4 margin. The tournament would not be held again due to the outbreak of World War I.
- The film The Life of General Villa — produced by D. W. Griffith, directed by Raoul Walsh featuring Pancho Villa himself — was released in the United States.
- The ballet Josephslegende (The Legend of Joseph), composed by Richard Strauss, premiered at the Paris Opera.
- Born:
  - Gul Khan Nasir, Baloch politician and poet from Pakistan, forefront of the Baloch Nationalist Movement, in Nushki, British India (present-day Pakistan) (d. 1983)
  - Robert M. Lindner, American psychologist, author of Rebel Without A Cause: The Hypnoanalysis Of A Criminal Psychopath; in New York City, United States (d. 1956)
- Died: Frederick Stanley Arnot, Scottish missionary, known for his collaboration with Yeke ruler Msiri in establish missionaries in Central Africa (b. 1858)

== May 15, 1914 (Friday) ==
- Sergeant Patrick N. Cullom of the Colorado National Guard testified in a military court martial that soldiers in his company had shot and killed labor activist Louis Tikas and two other fellow strikers while they tried to escape during the Ludlow Massacre in April.
- The first of three Werkbund Exhibitions was held at Rheinpark in Cologne, Germany. Among the most famous architectural feature showcased was Bruno Taut's Glass Pavilion, Walter Gropius and Adolf Meyer's model factory, and Henry van de Velde's model theater.
- The Baltic Exhibition opened in Malmö, Sweden to showcase the industry, art and culture of Sweden, Denmark, Germany and Russia — the four countries then bordering the Baltic Sea.
- The Abington Memorial Hospital in Abington Township, Montgomery County, Pennsylvania opened, and is now one of the largest hospitals in the northern Philadelphia suburbs.
- The comedic opera Mârouf, savetier du Caire by French composer Henri Rabaud debuted at the Opéra-Comique in Paris and became Raboud's most popular opera.
- Daily newspaper El Diario released its first edition in Paraná, Entre Ríos, Argentina.
- Born:
  - Angus MacLean, Canadian politician, 25th Premier of Prince Edward Island; as John Angus MacLean, in Lewes, Prince Edward Island, Canada (d. 2000)
  - Turk Broda, Canadian hockey player, goaltender for the Toronto Maple Leafs from 1935 to 1951; as Walter Edward Broda, in Brandon, Manitoba, Canada (d. 1972)
  - Norrie Paramor, British recording producer, best known to producing hits for artists such as Cliff Richard and Elton John; as Norman Paramor, in London, England (d. 1979)
  - Oscar Casanovas, Argentine boxer, gold medalist at the 1936 Summer Olympics; in Avellaneda, Argentina (d. 1987)

== May 16, 1914 (Saturday) ==
- Mexican Revolution – Mexican rebel forces under command of Álvaro Obregón captured Tepic and the only railroad between the ports of Guadalajara and Colima.
- Canadian Arctic Expedition – Karluk captain Robert Bartlett arrived in Emma Harbour and would rendezvous five days later with the whaler ship Herman to set out for Alaska.
- The National Challenge Cup association football final was played in Pawtucket, Rhode Island before a crowd of 10,000 spectators between two opposing Brooklyn football clubs. The Brooklyn Field Club beat Brooklyn Celtic 2–1, with Percy Adamson and James Ford scoring goals for Field Club against the single goal by Thomas Campion of Celtic.
- Born:
  - Edward T. Hall, American anthropologist, developed the concept of group cohesiveness; in Webster Groves, Missouri, United States (d. 2009)
  - Reg Hill, British television producer, known for producing the 1960s puppet TV series Thunderbirds; as Reginald Hill, in Surrey, England (d. 1999)
- Died: Pyotr Sviatopolk-Mirsky, Russian noble, served as Minister of Interior during the infamous 1905 Bloody Sunday massacre in Moscow (b. 1857)

== May 17, 1914 (Sunday) ==
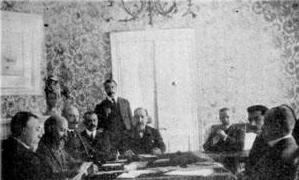
Signing of the Protocol of Corfu.

- The countries of Albania and Northern Epirus signed an agreement that recognized Northern Epirus as a self-governing region under the sovereignty of newly established Principality of Albania, known as the Protocol of Corfu.
- Thousands of rebels surrounded the town of Shijak, Albania, prompting Prince William of Albania to publicly accuse Essad Pasha Toptani, former head of the short lived Republic of Central Albania, of secretly leading the revolt.
- Canadian Northern Railway acquired Canadian Northern Ontario Railway.
- Canadian Arctic Expedition – The situation for survivors of the Karluk shipwreck on Wrangel Island took a dire turn after Captain Robert Bartlett left the group to seek help. Geologist George Malloch died from nephritis (from eating bad pemmican) and tent companion Bjarne Mamen, stricken with the same disease, was too ill to bury him. Malloch's body remained in the tent for several days before expedition member William McKinlay and others came to bury him (Barlett had ordered the group to be spread out around the island to increase hunting areas for the summer). Mamen died from the same disease 10 days later.
- The film Home, Sweet Home, directed by D. W. Griffith and based on the life of American poet John Howard Payne, was released to film audiences. The film starred Henry B. Walthall as Payne, who would also appear in Griffith's ground-breaking American Civil War epic The Birth of a Nation the following year.

== May 18, 1914 (Monday) ==
- Governor-General of the Philippines Francis Burton Harrison signed an executive order to establish 6,675.56 hectares (16,495.7 acres) of saline springs and forested mountains as part of the Salinas Forest Reserve (later proclaimed the Salinas Natural Monument in 2000).
- Born:
  - Catherine Dean May, American politician, first woman elected to United States Congress from Washington, from 1959 to 1971; as Catherine Dean Barnes, in Yakima, Washington, United States (d. 2004)
  - Frederick T. Moore Jr., American naval officer, commander of the USS Suribachi and USS Saratoga, Chief of Staff of the Naval Air Training Command at Naval Air Station Pensacola from 1965 to 1969, three-time recipient of the Air Medal and Legion of Merit; in Boston, United States (d. 1969)
  - Pierre Balmain, French fashion designer, founder of the fashion house Balmain; in Saint-Jean-de-Maurienne, France (d. 1982)
  - Marcel Bernard, French tennis player, five-time winner of the French Open; in La Madeleine, Nord, France (d. 1994)
  - Boris Christoff, Bulgarian opera singer, considered one of the greatest basses of the 20th century; in Plovdiv, Bulgaria (d. 1993)

== May 19, 1914 (Tuesday) ==
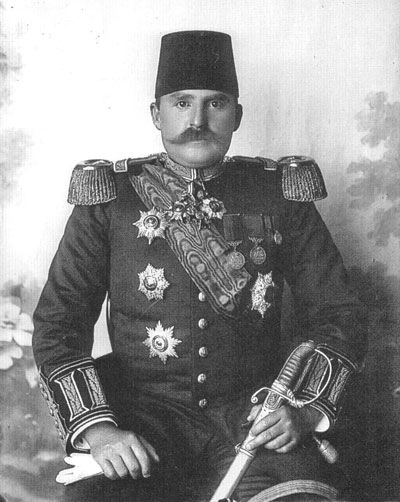
Essad Toptani

- Albanian interior minister Essad Pasha Toptani, former military officer with the Ottoman Empire and one of the principal organizers of another Albanian revolt two years earlier, surrendered to armed forces under Dutch gendarmerie officer Johan Sluys after shelling Toptani's house in Durrës, Albania. Toptani had been accused of leading a peasant revolt against the rule of Prince William of Albania. He was exiled to Rome the next day without trial.
- Sternwheeler Sicamous was launched by the Canadian Pacific Railway to service Okanagan Lake in British Columbia.
- Russian pilot Lydia Zvereva became the first woman to execute a loop, completing the aerobatic maneuver in a Morane-Saulnier monoplane over the hippodrome at Riga, Latvia.
- Tragedy struck following the completion of the Junior motorcycle road race at the Isle of Man Tourist Trophy. Irish newcomer Frederick James Walker had been leading when he wiped out on his Royal Enfield, allowing competing English racers Eric and Cyril Williams to pass him and win first and second places respectively. Walker remounted and completed the race to finish third, despite two more accidents. However, spectators spilling onto the road to watch the first two riders come in obscured his view of the finish line, causing Walker to continue past the judges box at full racing speed to the St. Ninians Crossroads where he collided with a wooden barrier in Ballaquayle Road. The racer was thrown from his motorcycle, sustaining injuries that he succumbed to later in hospital. The race committee posthumously declared Walker a third-place finish.
- Born:
  - Max Perutz, Austrian-British molecular biologist, recipient of the Nobel Prize in Chemistry for his research into the blood proteins hemoglobin and myoglobin; in Vienna, Austria-Hungary (present-day Austria) (d. 2002)
  - Humayun Abdulali, Indian biologist, leading contributor of bird research for the Bombay Natural History Society; in Kobe, Empire of Japan (present-day Japan) (d. 2001)
  - Maurice Rapf, American screenwriter, co-founder of the Screen Writers Guild; in Hanover, New Hampshire, United States (d. 2003)
  - Douglas Hunt, English association football player, centre forward for Tottenham, Barnsley, Sheffield and Leyton from 1933 to 1948; in Shipton Bellinger, England (d. 1989)

== May 20, 1914 (Wednesday) ==
- Niagara Falls peace conference — Envoys from South American countries Argentina, Brazil and Chile met with representatives from the U.S. Government in Niagara Falls, Ontario, for diplomatic negotiations in order to avoid war between the United States and Mexico, in response to deteriorating relations between the two countries due to the Tampico Affair during the Mexican Revolution.
- Charged with inciting dissent among the peasants, former state leader Essad Pasha Toptani was exiled to Italy.
- Born:
  - Corneliu Coposu, Romanian politician, major opponent to the Romanian Communist Party; in Bobota, Sălaj, Austria-Hungary (present-day Romania) (d. 1995)
  - Hideko Maehata, Japanese swimmer, first Japanese female athlete to win an Olympic gold medal (1936 Summer Olympics); in Hashimoto, Wakayama, Empire of Japan (present-day Japan) (d. 1995)
- Died: Chub Collins, Canadian baseball player, second baseman and shortstop for the Buffalo Bisons, Indianapolis Hoosiers, and Detroit Wolverines from 1884 to 1885 (b. 1857)

== May 21, 1914 (Thursday) ==
- The Senior motorcycle road race day at the Isle of Man Tourist Trophy competition finished with Cyril Pullin placing first while Howard R. Davies and Oliver Godfrey, the winner of the Tourist Trophy in 1911, both finished second in a dead heat.
- The Chilean Athletics Federation (Federación Atlética de Chile) was founded.
- The São Vicente Suspension Bridge, spanning 180 metres (590 ft), opened to the public in São Vicente, São Paulo, Brazil as the first suspension bridge in the country (some records have the opening on May 24).
- Born:
  - Oton Gliha, Croatian artist, best known for his series of abstract paintings based on the patterns of the drystone walls of coastal Croatia; in Črnomelj, Austria-Hungary (present-day Slovenia) (d. 1999)
  - Stan Benjamin, American baseball player, right fielder for the Philadelphia Phillies and Cleveland Indians from 1939 to 1945; as Alfred Stanley Benjamin, in Framingham, Massachusetts, United States (d. 2009)
- Died: Francis Laking, British physician, personal physician to British monarchs Queen Victoria, King Edward VII and King George V (b. 1847)

== May 22, 1914 (Friday) ==
- German master chess player Emanuel Lasker overtook Cuban master José Raúl Capablanca by a half-point (13½ to 13) to win the St. Petersburg chess tournament.
- Born:
  - Sun Ra, American jazz musician and composer, major figure in avant-garde jazz; as Herman Poole Blount, in Birmingham, Alabama, United States (d. 1993)
  - Adolf Pilch, Polish resistance fighter in World War II, led a special forces unit against German occupation in Poland in 1943 to 1945; in Wisła, Austria-Hungary (present-day Poland) (d. 2000)
  - Nikolay Fyodorovich Makarov, Russian engineer, designer of the Makarov pistol; in Sasovo, Russian Empire (present-day Russia) (d. 1988)

== May 23, 1914 (Saturday) ==
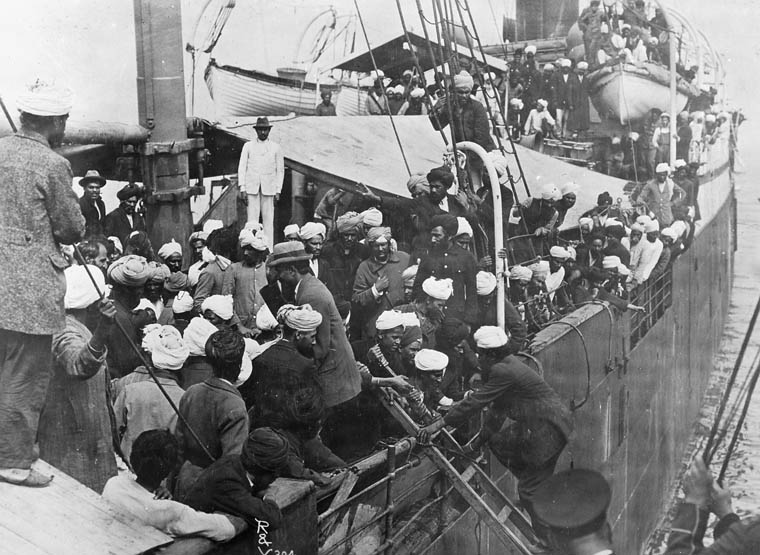
Sikhs aboard Komagata Maru in Vancouver's Burrard Inlet, 1914

- An International Gendarmerie composed of Dutch soldiers attempted to recapture the town of Shijak, Albania, but rebels surrounded and captured the entire unit, leading them to lay siege on the city of Durrës and force Prince William of Albania and his family onto an armored Italian ship for protection.
- Komagata Maru incident — The Japanese steamship SS Komagata Maru entered Canadian waters and arrived at Burrard Inlet, British Columbia (near Vancouver). Richard McBride, Premier of British Columbia released a statement that passengers could not disembark until the matter was decided by the Canadian federal government, forcing the ship to anchor some 200 meters offshore.
- Major P.J. Hamrock of the Colorado National Guard declared during a military court martial in Denver full responsibility for the action of soldiers under his command during the Ludlow Massacre. Some 39 officers and enlisted men were tried following a clash between state and militia on April 20 that instigated the Colorado Coalfield War.
- Aviation pioneer Gustav Hamel, credited for delivering the first airmail, disappeared while flying over the English Channel in new 80 hp Gnome Monosoupape engined Morane-Saulnier monoplane he had collected to compete with in the Aerial Derby scheduled the same day. A body matching his description was found in the Channel about two months later.
- Dutch socialist leader Henk Sneevliet founded the Indies Social Democratic Association, the forerunner to the Communist Party of Indonesia.
- The first students were enrolled at The Laidlaw Memorial School and Junior College in Ketti, India.
- The International Exhibition of Marine and Maritime Hygiene opened in Genoa to showcase life in the Italian colonies.
- Born: Barbara Ward, British economist, early advocate for sustainable development; in Heworth, York, England (d. 1981)
- Died: Pa-Trang-Loeng, a Cambodian tribal chief, is shot dead by a French colonist during a siege, marking the end of the 22 year long tribal uprising against the French in the Cambodia-Vietnam area.
- Died: William O'Connell Bradley, American politician, 32nd Governor of Kentucky (b. 1847)

== May 24, 1914 (Sunday) ==
- Belgium held a general election, with the Catholic Party winning a majority 41 out of 88 seats in the Chamber of Representatives.
- Canadian Arctic Expedition – Karluk captain Robert Bartlett arrived at Nome, Alaska on the whaler Herman but thick ice prevented the ship from reaching port. After three days, the ship turned south and landed at St Michael, where Bartlett sent a radio message to Ottawa informing the Canadian government of Karluk's fate.
- The 6th Giro d'Italia cycling race started in Milan with 81 cyclists competing in stages to Cuneo and back to Milan for a total racing distance of 3,162 km (1,965 mi).
- The association football club América was established in Curitiba, Brazil and would be active for 10 years before dissolving in 1924.
- The Bulgarian association football club Levski Sofia was formed, with the club named in honor of Vasil Levski, a Bulgarian revolutionary renowned as a national hero.
- The Empire Cricket Club was established in Barbados, named after the holiday to commemorate the Commonwealth of Nations, by disaffected members of the Spartan Cricket Club after it refused membership to Barbadian cricketer Herman Griffith because of his lower class status.
- Born: Arthur A. Link, American politician, 27th Governor of North Dakota, in Alexander, North Dakota (d. 2010)

== May 25, 1914 (Monday) ==
- The House of Commons of the United Kingdom passed Irish Home Rule.
- Pope Pius X created 25 cardinals.
- John Luke was re-elected as mayor of Wellington in a three-way race.
- The National University of Tucumán was founded in San Miguel de Tucumán, Argentina.
- The Chilean destroyer Almirante Goni was launched by J. Samuel White in Cowes, Isle of Wight but at the start of World War I was purchased by the Royal Navy and renamed HMS Broke.
- The fraternity Pi Mu Epsilon was founded at Syracuse University in New York by Professor Edward Drake Roe Jr., with a mission to promote the study of mathematics and recognize students who successfully pursued mathematical understanding.
- Born:
  - Frederick Howard Buller, Canadian aeronautical engineer, designer of noteworthy aircraft for de Havilland including the Otter, Twin Otter, Chipmunk and Caribou; in Vancouver, Canada (d. 1994)
  - Anita Magsaysay-Ho, Filipino painter, only female member of the Thirteen Moderns in the Philippines; as Anita Corpus Magsaysay, in Manila, Philippine Islands (present-day Philippines) (d. 2012)

== May 26, 1914 (Tuesday) ==
- A magnitude 7.9 earthquake struck off the northern coast of Papua, Indonesia, generating a tsunami that killed at least 101 people and destroyed many homes.
- Suffragist Maude Kate Smith committed a third attack on the art displays at the Royal Academy Summer Exhibition in London, this time damaging the painting Primavera by artist George Clausen.
- Former U.S. President Theodore Roosevelt, still weak from disease contracted while in South America, spoke to the National Geographic Society in Washington, D.C. about the expedition to the "River of Doubt" in the Amazon. Doubts from the science community surfaced that he and fellow explorer Cândido Rondon did not actually discover the river, but Roosevelt was able to dispel most of them by meeting with National Geographic and later with the Royal Geographical Society in June.
- Three Bosnian-Serb youth Gavrilo Princip, Trifko Grabež, and Nedeljko Čabrinović were supplied weapons and training by Serbian Major Vojislav Tankosić, a member of the secret Serbian military society Black Hand, in order to target and assassinate Archduke Franz Ferdinand of Austria, who was scheduled to inspect military maneuvers in Sarajevo in June.
- The Navarre railway line officially opened in Australia and would operate until 1954.
- Russian composer Igor Stravinsky premiered his opera The Nightingale, based on a story by Hans Christian Andersen at the Ballets Russes in Paris.
- Born:
  - Frankie Manning, American choreographer and dancer, one of the developers of the Lindy Hop; as Frank Manning, in Jacksonville, Florida, United States (d. 2009)
  - Geoffrey Unsworth, British cinematographer, best known for innovative visual effects in 2001: A Space Odyssey and Superman; in Atherton, Greater Manchester, England (d. 1978)
  - Dulce de Souza Lopes Pontes, Brazilian religious sister and founder of the Obras Sociais Irmã Dulce, canonised 13 October 2019 by Pope Francis; born as Maria Rita de Souza Pontes, in Salvador, Bahia, Brazil (d. 1992)
- Died: Jacob Riis, Danish-American journalist and social reformer, city editor for the New-York Tribune (b. 1849)

== May 27, 1914 (Wednesday) ==
- The Governor General of Canada hosted a royal garden party at the King Edward Hotel in Niagara Falls, Ontario to attending envoys from the United States, Mexico, Argentina, Brazil and Chile to celebrate successful negotiations at the Niagara Falls peace conference.
- British mystery writer Sir Arthur Conan Doyle, creator of Sherlock Holmes, arrived in New York City with his second wife Jean on the ocean liner RMS Olympic. Doyle had visited the United States 20 years earlier while it was the first for Jean. Along with New York, the couple's seven-week excursion included Canada, first to Montreal and then to Banff National Park which Doyle visited 20 years earlier. During his New York visit, news reporters asked his opinions on various contemporary issues including Irish Home Rule, American prison conditions, women's suffrage, and the recently completed Roosevelt–Rondon Scientific Expedition.
- The Memorial Building in Topeka, Kansas — a Grand Army of the Republic hall — was completed and dedicated to Union veterans of the American Civil War before 25,000 people.
- The monument to Serbian writer Dositej Obradović was unveiled at Academic Park in Belgrade.
- Born:
  - Hugh Le Caine, Canadian composer, pioneer in electronic music; in Port Arthur, Ontario, Canada (d. 1977)
  - Katherine Butler, Irish nun for the Religious Sisters of Charity, first woman in Ireland to earn a pilot's license; in Dublin, Ireland (d. 2000)

== May 28, 1914 (Thursday) ==
- Albanian Prime Minister Turhan Pasha Përmeti formed the fourth Cabinet of Albania.
- Nobel Prize winning Swedish author Selma Lagerlöf became the first woman to be inducted to the Swedish Academy (as well as the first woman to be awarded the Nobel Prize in Literature).
- Two suffragists slipped past sentries at Buckingham Palace in London and managed to smash two windows before escaping arrest. The window-smashing was part of vandalism campaign by suffragists to protest the House of Lords voting down a bill two weeks earlier that would have given British women the right to vote.
- The Bristol International Exhibition opened in Bristol, England and ran until June 6.
- Born:
  - W. G. G. Duncan Smith, British air force officer, commander of No. 603 Squadron during World War II, recipient of the Distinguished Service Order and Bar for bravery, father to British politician Iain Duncan Smith; as Wilfrid George Gerald Duncan Smith, in Madras, British India (present-day India) (d. 1996)
  - Fabri Salcedo, Spanish-American association football player, two League Title champions for the American Soccer League; as Fabriciano Salcedo, in Santander, Spain (d. 1985)
- Died: Joseph Swan, British physicist, inventor of the incandescent light bulb (b. 1828)

== May 29, 1914 (Friday) ==
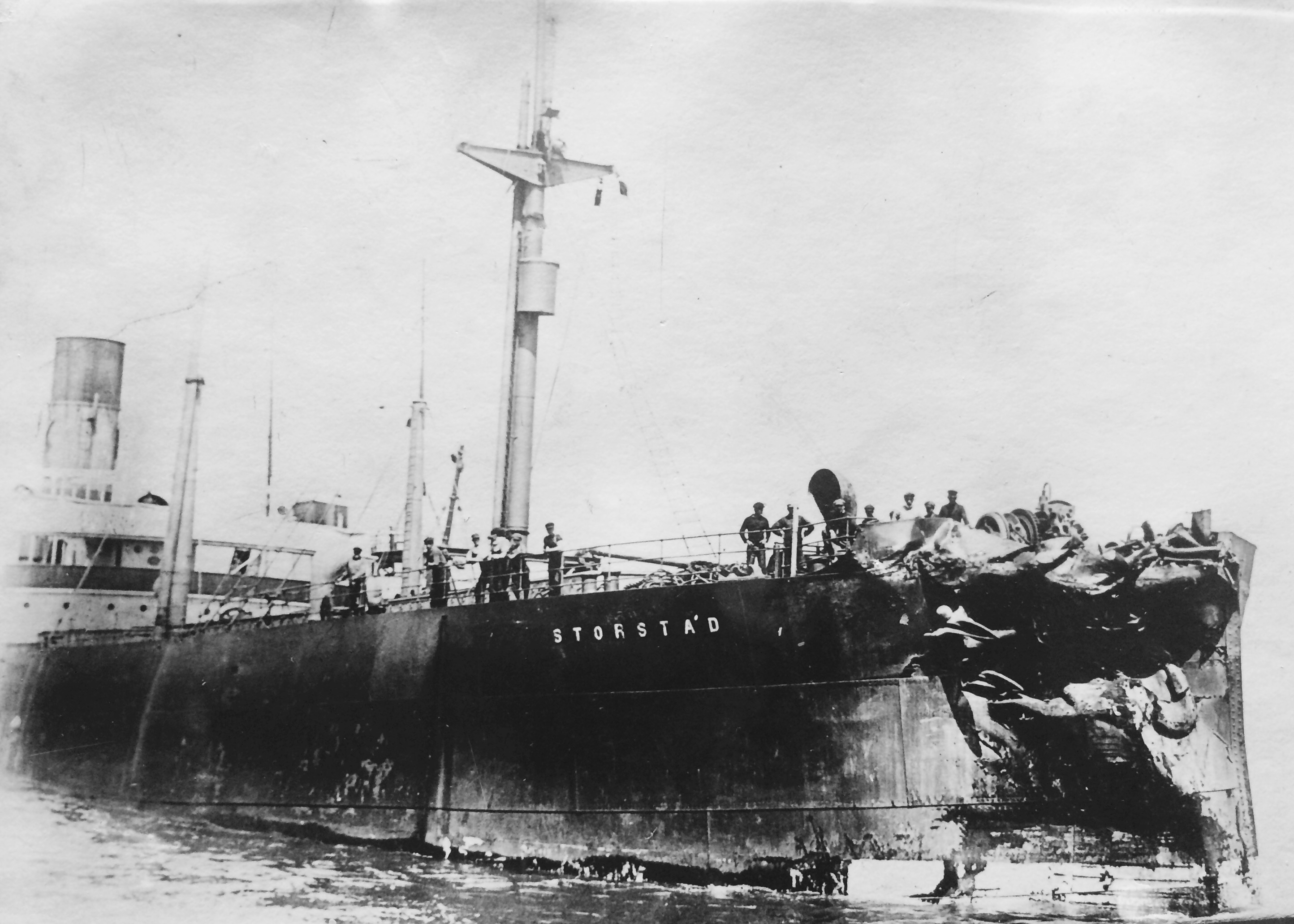
Damage sustained by Storstad after its collision with Empress of Ireland.

- The ocean liner RMS Empress of Ireland collided with Norwegian collier SS Storstad and sank in the Gulf of Saint Lawrence, with 1,012 out of the 1,477 passengers and crew lost. Despite sinking only a few hundred yards from shore with a distress signal wired within seconds of the collision, the ship listed to one side, rendering half of the lifeboats useless while heavy fog delayed rescue boats by a crucial 20 minutes. Among the noted casualties were British playwright Laurence Irving and his wife Mabel, and British explorer and politician Henry Seton-Karr.
- Legislative Speaker William Hoyle dissolved the 13th session of Legislative Assembly of Ontario for provincial elections.
- Norwegian sports clubs for association football, team handball, and floorball from various neighborhoods in Oslo joined to form Djerv. The club added badminton, Nordic skiing, bandy, and track and field programs in later years, changing its name again. A merger with another club in 2005 led to the club's present title Bygdø Monolitten.
- Born: Tenzing Norgay, Nepalese Sherpa mountaineer, first man, along with Edmund Hillary, to reach the summit of Mount Everest; as Namgyal Wangdi, in Khumbu, Kingdom of Nepal (present-day Nepal) (d. 1986)

== May 30, 1914 (Saturday) ==
- The ocean liner RMS Aquitania made her maiden voyage from Liverpool to New York City.
- René Thomas of France won the fourth running of the Indianapolis 500 at the Indianapolis Motor Speedway in a Delage Type Y race car.
- The inaugural season of the South Coast Rugby League in Australia (now the Group 7 Rugby League) started with the Kiama Knights competing and winning a 6–3 home game at Kiama Showground against the Gerringong Lions.
- Transit vehicle manufacturer Guy Motors was established in Wolverhampton, England.
- King Vajiravudh dedicated the opening of King Chulalongkorn Memorial Hospital in Bangkok.
- The hit Broadway musical Adele by Adolf Philipp made its West End debut in London at the Gaiety Theatre.
- Born: Akinoumi Setsuo, Japanese champion sumo wrestler, broke fellow competitor Futabayama Sadaji's 69-bout winning streak in 1939; in Hiroshima, Empire of Japan (present-day Japan) (d. 1979)

== May 31, 1914 (Sunday) ==
- State mine inspectors assessed the total casualties from the Colorado Coalfield War since miners went on strike in 1913, with 66 dead and 48 wounded in battles between strikers and mine militia. Twenty people, including 12 children, died in the Ludlow Massacre on April 20, and 46 more were killed in clashes the following 10 days until federal troops intervened. Financial losses for the state's economy were estimated between $10 million and $12 million. The United Mine Workers reported the number of striking workers fell from 11,000 to 8,500, with many leaving the state as opposed to going back to work.
- The German football championship was held in Magdeburg, Germany with 6,000 in attendance. The club Greuther Fürth beat Leipzig 3–2 with Karl Franz scoring the winning goal.
- Auto racer Willy Scholl of Germany won the second Russian Grand Prix in Saint Petersburg, driving a Benz with a winning time of 2:23:54.6. The outbreak of World War I put an end to the racing event until it was revived in 2014.
- Bishop William Quayle dedicated the opening of St. Paul United Methodist Church, in Cedar Rapids, Iowa. It was listed in the National Register of Historic Places in 1985.
- Born: Akira Ifukube, Japanese classical music/film composer, best known for composing soundtracks to the Godzilla movies by Toho; in Kushiro, Hokkaido, Empire of Japan (present-day Japan) (d. 2006)
- Died: Angelo Moriondo, Italian businessman, inventor of the espresso coffee machine (b. 1851)
