= 1920 Hong Kong sanitary board election =

← 1919	12 April 1920	1922 →
- Registered: ≈1,700
- Turnout: 368 (≈22%)
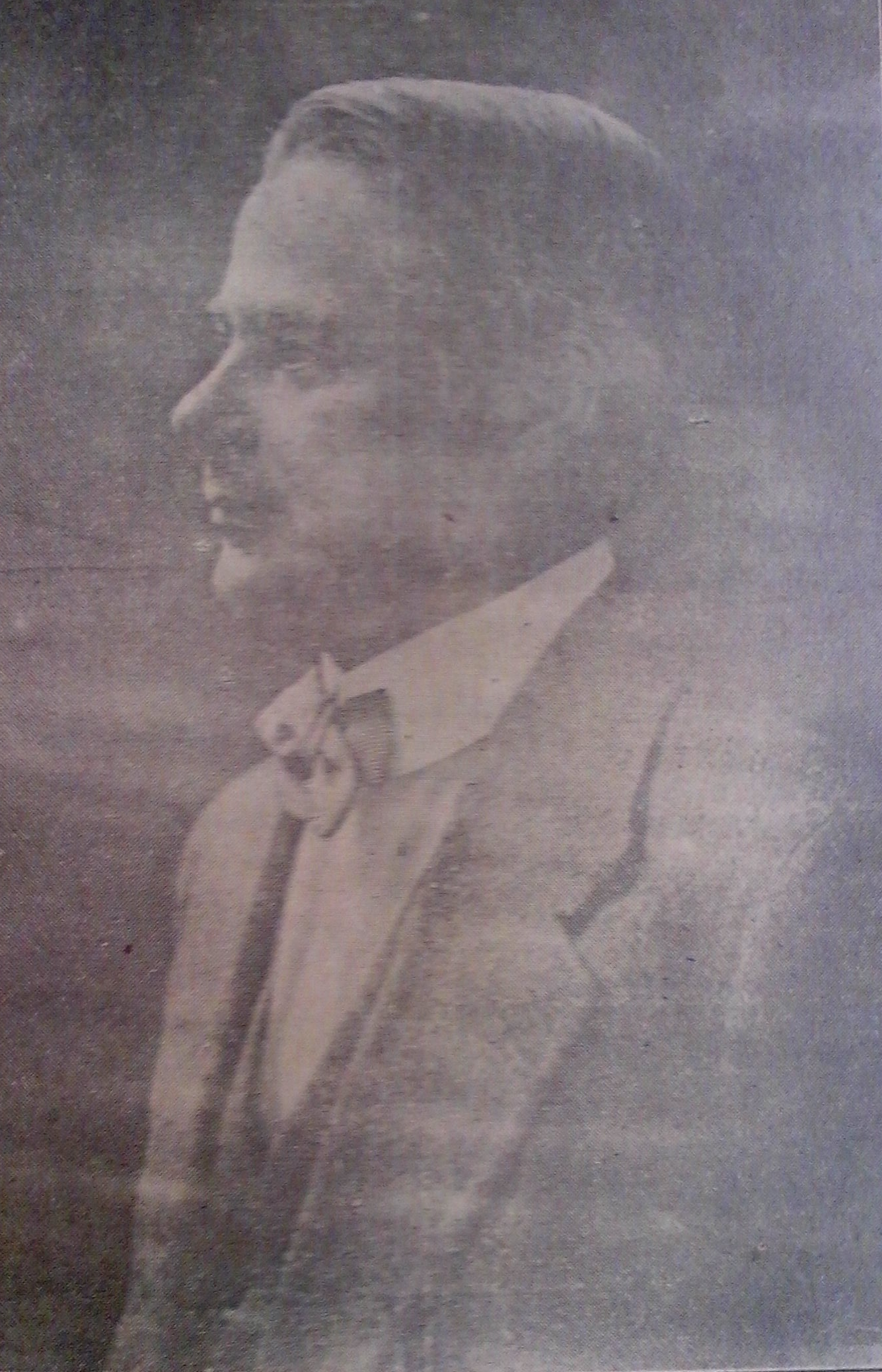

Nominee	C. G. Alabaster	J. Caer Clark
Party	CRA	KRA
Popular vote	191	164
Percentage	53.80%	46.20%
Member before election
C. G. Alabaster
CRA
Elected Member
C. G. Alabaster
CRA

The 1920 Hong Kong Sanitary Board election was held on 12 April 1920 for an elected seat in the Sanitary Board of Hong Kong.

The election was held for two of the elected seats in the board due to the expiry of term of C. G. Alabaster. Alabaster returned to the Board by winning majority of 27 votes over architect J. Caer Clark, who was supported by the Kowloon Residents Association. With an electorate of about 1,700, less than 400 voted and 13 spoilt votes were recorded.
