= 1926 Hong Kong sanitary board election =

← 1924	12 April 1926	1927 →
Nominee	Ho Sai-chuen	F. M. G. Ozorio
Party	Nonpartisan	Nonpartisan
Popular vote	220	158
Percentage	58.2%	41.8%
Member before election
C. G. Alabaster
Elected Member
Ho Sai-chuen

The 1926 Hong Kong Sanitary Board election was held on 12 April 1926 for replacing the retiring C. Grenville Alabaster in the Sanitary Board of Hong Kong. It was one of the few contests in the Sanitary Board elections.

Only ratepayers who were included in the Special and Common Jury Lists of the years or ratepayers who are exempted from serving on Juries on account of their professional avocations, unofficial members of the Executive or Legislative Council, or categories of profession were entitled to vote at the election.

Two nominations were received from former Board member Dr. F. M. G. Ozorio and Dr. Ho Sai-chuen. Dr. Ozorio was once the member of the Board for nine years until he resigned in 1925. He was nominated by Mr. C. A. da Roza and seconded by mr. J. M. d'Almada Remedios. Dr. Ho was nominated by Dr. S. F. Lee and seconded by Dr. Robert Kotewall.

== Result ==
Name	Votes
Dr S. C. Ho	220
Dr. F. M. G. Ozorio	158
Spoilt Papers	16
Total Votes	304
