= 1915 Hong Kong sanitary board election =

Election for the Sanitary Board of Hong Kong

- 22 January 1915
- Registered: 1,325
- Turnout: 806 (60.83%)

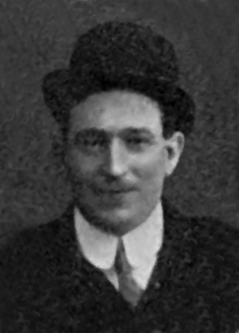

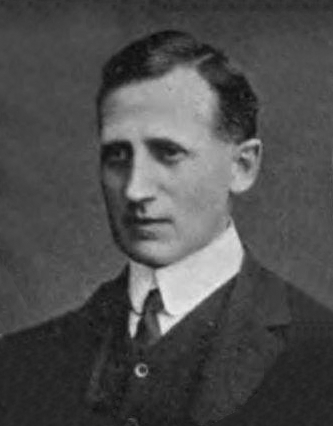
| Nominee | G. H. L. Fitzwilliams | P. W. Goldring | F. B. L. Bowley |
| Party | Nonpartisan | Nonpartisan | Nonpartisan |
| Popular vote | 363 | 223 | 220 |
| Percentage | 45.04% | 27.67% | 27.30% |
Members before election
G. H. L. Fitzwilliams
P. W. Goldring
Elected Members
G. H. L. Fitzwilliams
P. W. Goldring

The 1915 Hong Kong Sanitary Board election was held on 22 January 1915 for the two unofficial seats in the Sanitary Board of Hong Kong.

== Overview ==
Only ratepayers who were included in the Special and Common Jury Lists of the years or ratepayers who are exempted from serving on Juries on account of their professional avocations, unofficial members of the Executive or Legislative Council, or categories of profession were entitled to vote at the election.

The election took place from 4 to 6 p.m. on 22 January in the Registry of the Supreme Court. Out of 1200 eligible voters on the jurors list and 300 exemptions, only 430 voters polled.

Three candidates ran for two seats with two long serving Board members F. B. L. Bowley and G. H. L. Fitzwilliams and also P. W. Goldring who was elected in the 1914 by-election, filling Bowley's vacant seat. Bowley was nominated by David Landale and seconded by Henry Pollock, Fitzwilliams by Henry Pollock and H. W. Looker and Goldring by E. J. Grist and H. S. Playfair.

Fitzwilliams and Goldring were elected and 806 votes out of 1,325 electorates were cast.

Sanitary Board Election 1915
| Party | Candidate | Votes | % | ±% |
|---|---|---|---|---|
| Nonpartisan | Dr. G. H. Frizwilliams | 363 | 45.04 | |
| Nonpartisan | P. W. Goldring | 223 | 27.67 | |
| Nonpartisan | F. B. L. Bowley | 220 | 27.30 | |
| Turnout | | 806 | 60.83 | |
| Registered electors | | 1,325 | | |
