= 1917 Hong Kong sanitary board election =

- 30 March 1917
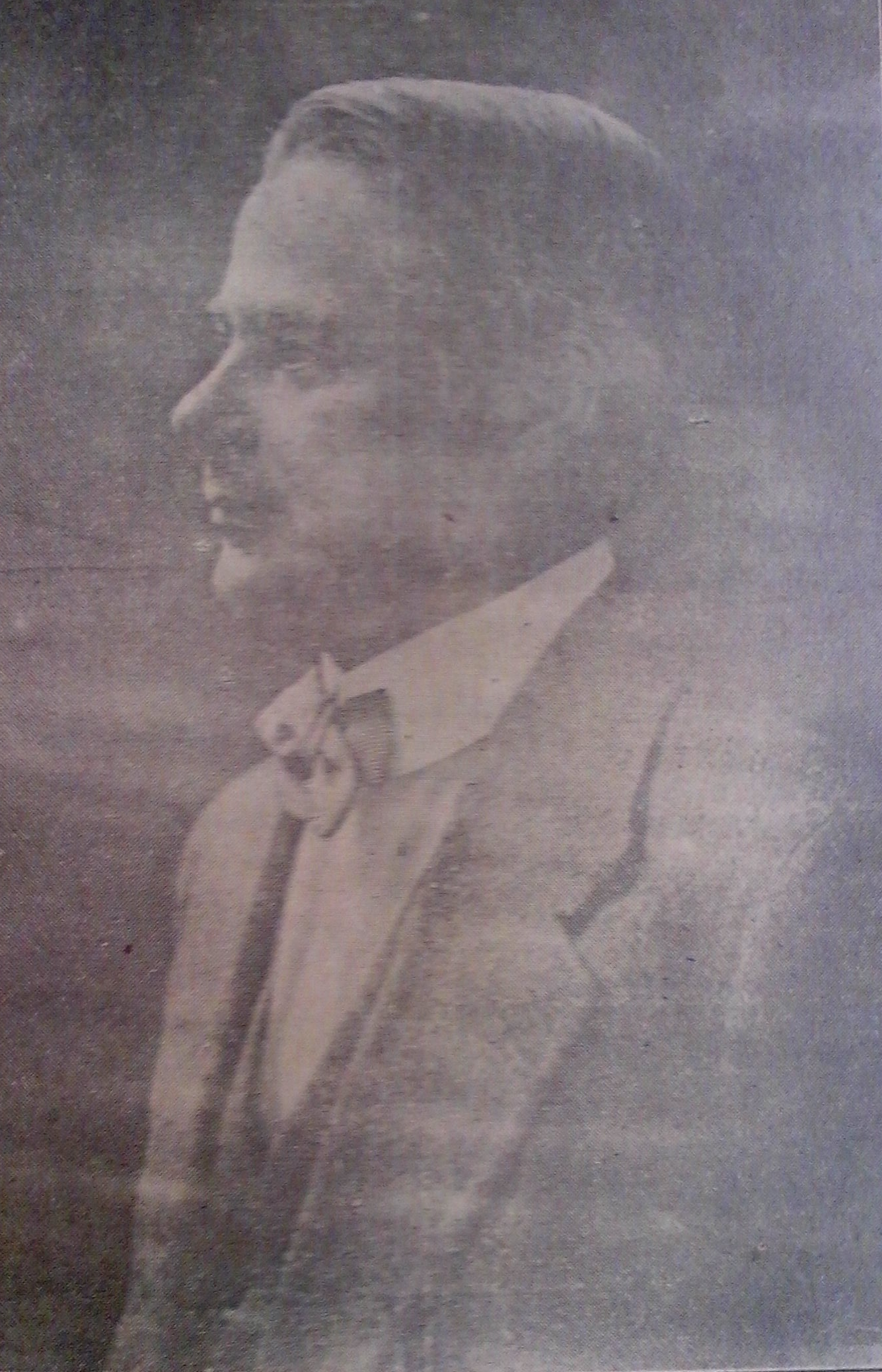
Nominee	C. G. Alabaster
Party	Nonpartisan
Popular vote	uncontested
Member before election
P. W. Goldring
Elected Member
C. G. Alabaster

The 1917 Hong Kong Sanitary Board election was supposed to be held on 30 March 1917 for an elected seat in the Sanitary Board of Hong Kong.

The election was held for two of the elected seats in the board due to the resignation of P. W. Goldring who resigned early in the month. C. G. Alabaster, nominated by Henry Pollock and Montague Ede was elected unopposed.
