= 1916 Hong Kong sanitary board election =

- 18 February 1916
Nominee	F. M. G. Ozorio	H. G. Earle
Party	Nonpartisan	Nonpartisan
Popular vote	330	85
Percentage	79.52%	20.48%
Member before election
G. H. L. Fitzwilliams
Elected Member
F. M. G. Ozorio

The 1916 Hong Kong Sanitary Board election was held on 18 February 1916 for an elected seat in the Sanitary Board of Hong Kong.

The election was held for two of the elected seats in the board due to the resignation of Dr. G. H. L. Fitzwilliams who resigned in January.

There were eight spoilt papers and only 323 of the Jury List of between 1,100 and 1,200 votes. Dr. F. M. G. Ozorio returned to the office by large majority over Dr. H. G. Earle, a professor at the University of Hong Kong.
