= 1924 Hong Kong sanitary board election =

- 11 December 1924
Nominee	J. C. Macgown
Party	Nonpartisan
Popular vote	Uncontested
Member before election
F. M. G. Ozorio
Elected Member
J. C. Macgown

The 1924 Hong Kong Sanitary Board election was supposed to be held on 11 December 1924 for an elected seat in the Sanitary Board of Hong Kong.

The election was held for two of the elected seats on the board due to the resignation of Filomeno Maria Graca Ozorio. J. C. Macgown was elected to the Board uncontested.
