= 1919 Hong Kong sanitary board election =

- 10 March 1919
Nominee	F. M. G. Ozorio
Party	Nonpartisan
Popular vote	Uncontested
Member before election
F. M. G. Ozorio
Elected Member
F. M. G. Ozorio

The 1919 Hong Kong Sanitary Board election was supposed to be held on 10 March 1919 for one of the two unofficial seats in the Sanitary Board of Hong Kong.

Only ratepayers who were included in the Special and Common Jury Lists of the years or ratepayers who are exempted from serving on Juries on account of their professional avocations, unofficial members of the Executive or Legislative Council, or categories of profession were entitled to vote at the election.

Dr. F. M. G. Ozorio sought for second term without being uncontested.
