= 1912 Hong Kong sanitary board election =

- 19 January 1912

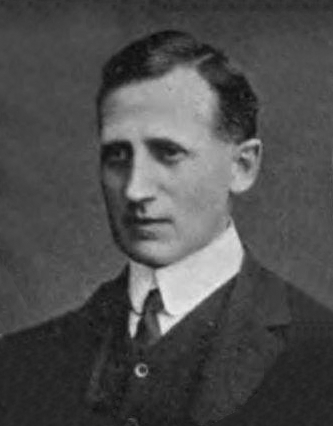
Nominee	Gerard H. L. Fitzwilliams	F. B. L. Bowley
Party	Nonpartisan	Nonpartisan
Popular vote	Uncontested	Uncontested
Members before election
A. Shelton Hooper
Gerard H. L. Fitzwilliams
Elected Members
Gerard H. L. Fitzwilliams
F. B .L. Bowley

The 1912 Hong Kong Sanitary Board election was held on 19 January 1912 for the two unofficial seats in the Sanitary Board of Hong Kong.

Only ratepayers who were included in the Special and Common Jury Lists of the years or ratepayers who are exempted from serving on Juries on account of their professional avocations, unofficial members of the Executive or Legislative Council, or categories of profession were entitled to vote at the election.

== Overview of outcome ==
Sanitary Board Election 1912
Party	Candidate	Votes	%	±%
Nonpartisan	Gerard Hall Lloyd Fitzwilliams	Unopposed		
Nonpartisan	Francis Bulmer Lyon Bowley	Unopposed		
