= 1927 Hong Kong sanitary board election =

- 30 December 1927
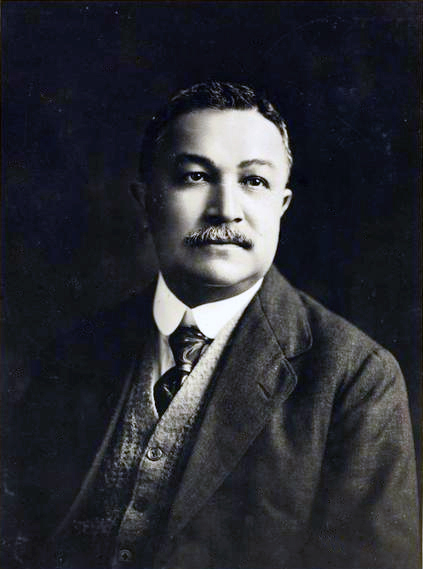
Nominee	José Pedro Braga
Party	KRA
Popular vote	Uncontested
Member before election
J. C. Macgown
Elected Member
José Pedro Braga

The 1927 Hong Kong Sanitary Board election was supposed to be held on 30 December 1927 for one of the two unofficial seats in the Sanitary Board of Hong Kong.

Only ratepayers who were included in the Special and Common Jury Lists of the years or ratepayers who are exempted from serving on Juries on account of their professional avocations, unofficial members of the Executive or Legislative Council, or categories of profession were entitled to vote at the election.

José Pedro Braga was elected without being uncontested.
