= 1914 Hong Kong sanitary board election =

1914 Hong Kong sanitary board by-election
- 1 May 1914
- Registered: ≈1,200
- Turnout: 175 (≈14.58%)
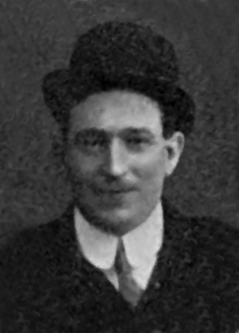

Nominee	P. W. Goldring	W. L. Carter
Party	Nonpartisan	Nonpartisan
Popular vote	142	33
Percentage	81.14%	18.86%
Members before election
F. B. L. Bowley
Elected Members
P. W. Golding

The 1914 Hong Kong Sanitary Board by-election was held on 1 May 1914 for one of the two unofficial seats in the Sanitary Board of Hong Kong. It was a by-election caused by the absence of F. B. L. Bowley from Hong Kong on holiday.

== Overview ==
There were two candidates, P. W. Goldring, senior member of the Goldring and Russ solicitors firm and W. L. Carter, manager of the China and Japan Telephone and Electric Co., Ltd.. Goldring was proposed by E. J. Grist and seconded by Playfair while Carter was proposed by E. A. Hewett and seconded by H. E. Pollock.

The polling took place at the City Hall from 4 to 6 p.m. on 1 May 1914, presided by H. A. Nisbet, Registrar of the Supreme Court. With the inclement weather, only 175 persons of the around 1,200 voters showed up. Goldring was elected with the majority of 109 votes.

Sanitary Board By-election 1914
Party	Candidate	Votes	%	±%
Nonpartisan	P. W. Goldring	142	81.14	
Nonpartisan	W. L. Carter	33	18.86	
Majority		109	62.29	
Turnout		175	≈14.58	
Registered electors		≈1,200		
