= Ho Sai-chuen =

Hong Kong doctor

Dr. Ho Sai-chuen (c. 1891 – 29 April 1938) was a Hong Kong doctor from the influential Hotung family and member of the Sanitary Board.

== Biography ==
Son of Ho Fook and nephew of Sir Robert Ho Tung, he was born in the most prestigious Chinese family in Hong Kong. He was educated at King's College School, London and subsequently St. John's College, Cambridge where he graduated in medicine and surgery. His grandfather thought Ho Fook was a Jewish Dutch man Charles Maurice Bosman.

He served with the Medical Corps in England and France during the First World War. After returning to Hong Kong, he set up his own practice and gave free consultations to the poor of Hong Kong.

When the incumbent Sanitary Board member C. G. Alabaster retired in 1926, Dr. Ho ran in the 1926 election against former Sanitary Board member Dr. F. M. G. Ozorio. Dr. Ho was nominated by Dr. S. F. Li and also R. H. Kotewall, member of the Legislative Council. He was elected with 220 votes against Dr. Ozorio's 158 votes. He served for a three-year term until he announced he would not seek for re-election.

He quit his work and went North to serve the wounded soldiers and civilians after the outbreak of the Second Sino-Japanese War in 1937. Shortly after he returned to Hong Kong, Dr. Ho died at 6 a.m. on 29 April 1938 at the French Hospital at the age of 47 where he was admitted on 27 April following a cerebral haemorrhage. His funeral took place on the next day and was interment took place at the Mount Davis Cemetery, the private cemetery for members of the family of Sir Robert Ho Tung as well as the Eurasian community.

Dr. Ho was very fond of fishing and shooting, and also indulged in other sports during his younger days.

== See also ==
- Four big families of Hong Kong

Political offices
Preceded by C. G. Alabaster	Member of the Sanitary Board; 1926–1929	Succeeded by Man Kam Lo
