= John Caer Clark =

John Caer Clark (died 8 June 1943) was a British architect in Hong Kong.

Clark was an authorised architect in Hong Kong from 1912 to 1941. He formed the Clark & Iu with partner Iu Tak-chung from 1924 to 1937 before he started his own practice again in 1938 until the Japanese occupation of Hong Kong in 1941. The Tung Wah Group of Hospitals was one of his clients.

He died during internment at the Stanley Internment Camp on 8 June 1943.
