= 1922 Swiss referendums =

Five referendums were held in Switzerland during 1922. The first three were held on 11 June on the process of obtaining Swiss citizenship, on expelling foreigners and on the eligibility of federal officials to stand in National Council elections. All three were rejected. The fourth was held on 24 September on an amendment of the criminal law regarding constitutional and domestic security, and was also rejected. The fifth was held on 3 December on introducing a one-off property tax, and was rejected by a wide margin.

== Background ==
The referendums on citizenship, expelling foreigners, federal officials and the one-off property tax were all popular initiatives, which required a double majority; a majority of the popular vote and majority of the cantons. The decision of each canton was based on the vote in that canton. Full cantons counted as one vote, whilst half cantons counted as half. The referendum on the criminal law was an optional referendum, which required only a majority of the public vote.

== Results ==
=== Citizenship ===
Choice	Popular vote		Cantons		
Choice	Votes	%	Full	Half	Total
For	65,828	15.9	0	0	0
Against	347,988	84.1	19	6	22
Blank votes	30,259	–	–	–	–
Invalid votes	1,025	–	–	–	–
Total	445,100	100	19	6	22
Registered voters/turnout	976,105	45.6	–	–	–
Source: Nohlen & Stöver

=== Expulsion of foreigners ===
Choice	Popular vote		Cantons		
Choice	Votes	%	Full	Half	Total
For	159,200	38.1	0	0	0
Against	258,881	61.9	19	6	22
Blank votes	25,991	–	–	–	–
Invalid votes	1,028	–	–	–	–
Total	445,100	100	19	6	22
Registered voters/turnout	976,105	45.6	–	–	–
Source: Nohlen & Stöver

=== Electoral eligibility of federal officials ===
Choice	Popular vote		Cantons		
Choice	Votes	%	Full	Half	Total
For	160,181	38.4	4	2	5
Against	257,469	61.6	15	4	17
Blank votes	26,433	–	–	–	–
Invalid votes	1,017	–	–	–	–
Total	445,100	100	19	6	22
Registered voters/turnout	976,105	45.6	–	–	–
Source: Nohlen & Stöver

=== Amendment of the criminal law ===
Choice	Votes	%
For	303,794	44.6
Against	376,832	55.4
Blank votes	8,058	–
Invalid votes	2,160	–
Total	690,844	100
Registered voters/turnout	982,567	70.3
Source: Nohlen & Stöver

=== One-off property tax ===
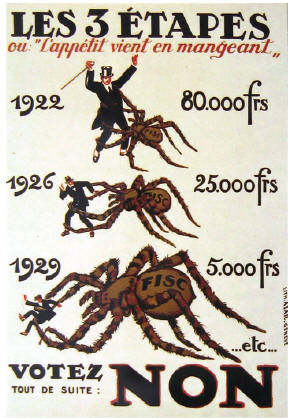
Poster artwork by Jules Courvoisier demanding a "no" vote on the initiative

Choice	Popular vote		Cantons		
Choice	Votes	%	Full	Half	Total
For	109,702	13.0	0	0	0
Against	736,952	87.0	19	6	22
Blank votes	7,525	–	–	–	–
Invalid votes	1,969	–	–	–	–
Total	856,148	100	19	6	22
Registered voters/turnout	992,523	86.3	–	–	–
Source: Nohlen & Stöver
