= 1922 Monegasque general election =

General election were held in Monaco on 21 May 1922 to elect 12 members of the National Council. The national councilmen were elected by a 30-member Electoral College.

== Electoral College ==
The 30-member Electoral College consisted of nine members elected by the Communal Council and 21 members elected by voters. It also had substitute members elected by the Communal Council and six substitute members elected by voters.

=== Members elected by Communal Council ===
The Communal Council held an election for nine members and three substitute members of the Electoral College on 29 April 1922, after a failed election on 25 March 1922.

=== Members elected by voters ===
An election of the remaining 21 Electoral College members and six substitute members was held on 30 April 1922. Only 20 candidates got a majority of votes to be elected.

	Candidates	Votes
Members	Jean Bonafède	407
Members	Louis Médecin	335
Members	Lazare Gastaud	290
Members	Fulbert Aureglia	231
Members	Clément Ciais	228
Members	François Devissi	227
Members	Étienne Vatrican	226
Members	Victor Bonafède	226
Members	Adolphe Blanchi	224
Members	Auguste Gastaud	223
Members	Henri Olivié	223
Members	Antoine Rapaire	223
Members	Joseph Raimbert	221
Members	Louis Rapaire	221
Members	Étienne Fautrier	221
Members	Ambroise Bonaventure	220
Members	Joseph Lorenzi	220
Members	François Fontana	219
Members	Jean Vatrican	217
Members	Antoine Icardi	212
Members	Étienne Ctovetto	191
Members	Henri Médecin	187
Members	Louis Bœuf	185
Members	Laurent Aureglia	183
Members	Eugène Marquet Jr.	183
Members	Henri Rapaire	183
Members	Charles Vatrican	182
Members	Jean Vatrican, d'Étienne	182
Members	Édouard Giordano	181
Members	Célestin Allavena	180
Members	Louis Settimo	180
Members	Jean Vatrican, entrepreneur	179
Members	Jules Crovetto	177
Substitute members	Théodore Raimbert	222
Substitute members	Henri Bergeaud	221
Substitute members	Pierre Campana	221
Substitute members	Jean Bœuf	220
Substitute members	François Scotto	219
Substitute members	Jean Fontana	218
Substitute members	Emmanuel Bœuf	189
Substitute members	Louis Blanchy	188
Substitute members	Joseph Boisson	184
Substitute members	Marcel Médecin	183
Substitute members	Jean Bocca	178
Substitute members	Jules Baud	177
Valid ballots		416
Invalid ballots		8
Total ballots		424
Registered voters		661

== National Council ==
Candidates	Votes
Louis Aureglia	30
Victor Bonafède Jr.	30
Jean Marsan	28
Paul Cioco	27
Henri Marquet	27
Joseph Crovetto	26
Alexandre Médecin	25
Michel Fontana	24
Eugène Marquet	24
François Devissi	23
Louis Bellando de Castro	22
Adolphe Olivié	21
André Notari	12
Étienne Fatitrier	11
Paul Bergeaud	6
Pierre Jioffredy	5
François Scotto	2
