= 1922 Wisconsin lieutenant gubernatorial election =

- November 7, 1922
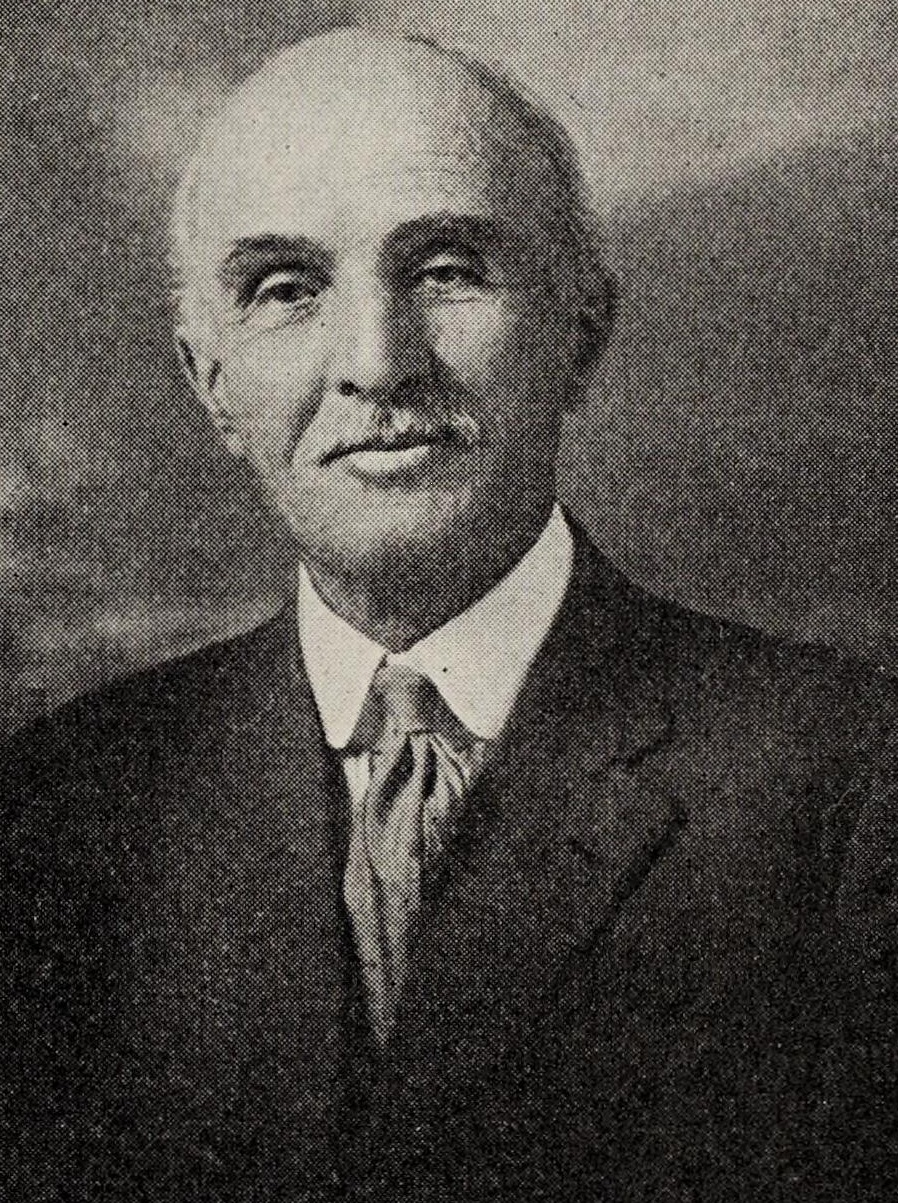

Nominee	George Comings	Joseph R. Pfiffner	Martin Georgensen
Party	Republican	Independent Democrat	Social-Democratic
Popular vote	351,505	44,847	42,499
Percentage	76.56%	9.77%	9.26%
Lieutenant Governor before election
George Comings
Republican
Elected Lieutenant Governor
George Comings
Republican

The 1922 Wisconsin lieutenant gubernatorial election was held on November 7, 1922, in order to elect the lieutenant governor of Wisconsin. Incumbent Republican lieutenant governor George Comings defeated Independent Democrat nominee Joseph R. Pfiffner, Social-Democratic nominee Martin Georgensen and Prohibition nominee Ella Tenney Sanford.

== Republican primary ==
The Republican primary election was held on September 5, 1922. Incumbent lieutenant governor George Comings received a majority of the votes (65.25%) against incumbent Speaker of the Wisconsin State Assembly Riley S. Young, and was thus elected as the nominee for the general election.

=== Results ===
1922 Republican lieutenant gubernatorial primary
Party	Candidate	Votes	%
Republican	George Comings (incumbent)	296,390	65.25%
Republican	Riley S. Young	157,879	34.75%
Total votes		454,269	100.00%

== General election ==
On election day, November 7, 1922, incumbent Republican lieutenant governor George Comings won re-election by a margin of 306,658 votes against his foremost opponent Independent Democrat nominee Joseph R. Pfiffner, thereby retaining Republican control over the office of lieutenant governor. Comings was sworn in for his second term on January 1, 1923.

=== Results ===
Wisconsin lieutenant gubernatorial election, 1922
Party	Candidate	Votes	%
Republican	George Comings (incumbent)	351,505	76.56
Independent Democrat	Joseph R. Pfiffner	44,847	9.77
Social-Democratic	Martin Georgensen	42,499	9.26
Prohibition	Ella Tenney Sanford	20,121	4.38
	Scattering	155	0.03
Total votes		459,127	100.00
Republican hold			
