= Kaikohe railway station =

Defunct railway station in New Zealand

Coordinates: 35.4154°S 173.8013°E

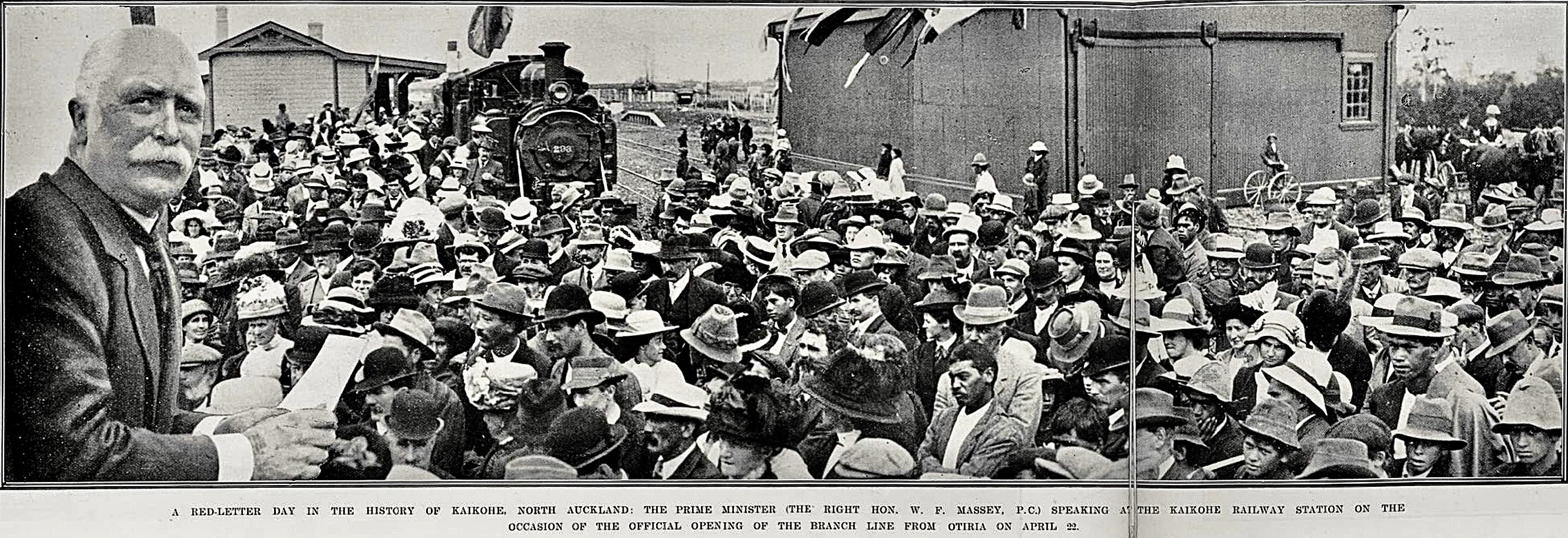
- Bill Massey at Kaikohe 1914 opening with NZR WB class 293

General information
- Location: New Zealand
- Elevation: 191 m (627 ft)
- Line: Okaihau Branch
Location

Kaikohe railway station was a station on the Okaihau Branch in Kaikohe, New Zealand.

The station was opened on 22 April 1914 and closed for passengers on 21 June 1976, freight on 10 March 1987 and fully on 1 November 1987.
