= 1922 Connecticut lieutenant gubernatorial election =

- November 7, 1922
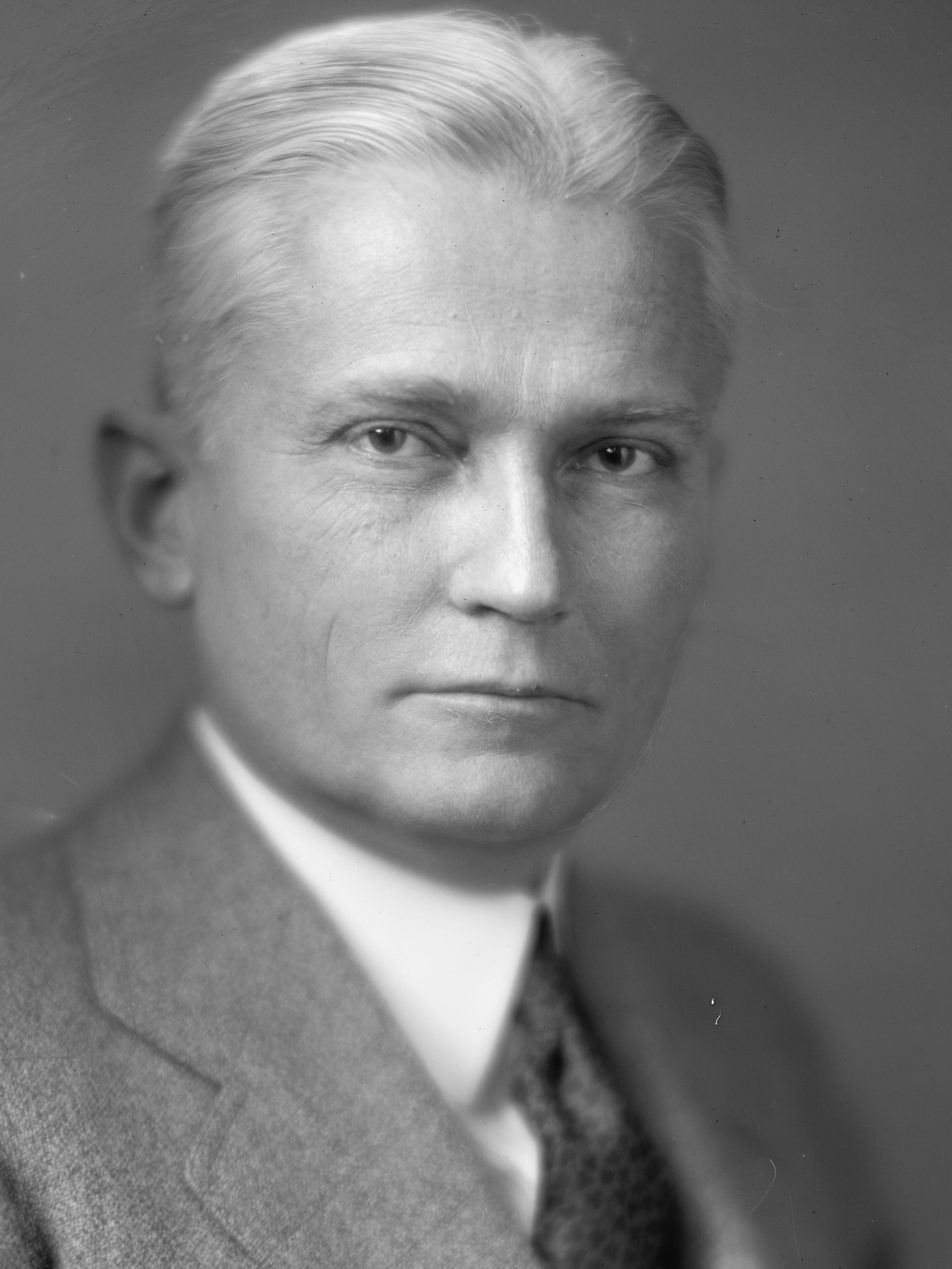

Nominee	Hiram Bingham III	Frank M. Chapin
Party	Republican	Democratic
Popular vote	171,689	146,674
Percentage	53.90%	46.10%
Lieutenant Governor before election
Charles A. Templeton
Republican
Elected Lieutenant Governor
Hiram Bingham III
Republican

The 1922 Connecticut lieutenant gubernatorial election was held on November 7, 1922, to elect the lieutenant governor of Connecticut. Republican nominee Hiram Bingham III won the election against Democratic nominee Frank M. Chapin.

== General election ==
On election day, November 7, 1922, Republican nominee Hiram Bingham III won the election with 53.90% of the vote, thereby retaining Republican control over the office of lieutenant governor. Bingham was sworn in as the 78th lieutenant governor of Connecticut on January 3, 1923.

=== Results ===
Connecticut lieutenant gubernatorial election, 1922
Party	Candidate	Votes	%
Republican	Hiram Bingham III	171,689	53.90
Democratic	Frank M. Chapin	146,674	46.10
Total votes		318,363	100.00
Republican hold			
