= 1922 Nicaraguan parliamentary election =

Parliamentary elections were held in Nicaragua in November 1922 to elect half of the seats in the Chamber of Deputies and one-third of the seats in the Senate of the National Congress.

The conservative candidates won in practically every district, including the overwhelmingly liberal city of León.
