= 1922 Texas lieutenant gubernatorial election =

- November 7, 1922

Nominee	Thomas Whitfield Davidson	George E. Kepple
Party	Democratic	Republican
Popular vote	353,550	56,519
Percentage	86.22%	13.78%
Lieutenant Governor before election
Lynch Davidson
Democratic
Elected Lieutenant Governor
Thomas Whitfield Davidson
Democratic

The 1922 Texas lieutenant gubernatorial election was held on November 7, 1922, in order to elect the lieutenant governor of Texas. Democratic nominee and incumbent member of the Texas Senate Thomas Whitfield Davidson defeated Republican nominee George E. Kepple.

== General election ==
On election day, November 7, 1922, Democratic nominee Thomas Whitfield Davidson won the election by a margin of 297,031 votes against his opponent Republican nominee George E. Kepple, thereby retaining Democratic control over the office of lieutenant governor. Davidson was sworn in as the 27th lieutenant governor of Texas on January 16, 1923.

=== Results ===
Texas lieutenant gubernatorial election, 1922
Party	Candidate	Votes	%
Democratic	Thomas Whitfield Davidson	353,550	86.22
Republican	George E. Kepple	56,519	13.78
Total votes		410,069	100.00
Democratic hold			
