= Herbert Gastineau Earle =

British physiologist

Dr. Herbert Gastineau Earle (10 August 1882 – 5 June 1946) was an English physiologist.

== Publications ==
- Basal Metabolism with Special Reference to Chinese Students (1923)
- An Imperial Policy in Education (1926)
- Report on the Lester Trust, Shanghai (1927)
- Basal Metabolism of Chinese and Westerners (1928)
