= F. B. L. Bowley =

Hong Kong solicitor and member of the Sanitary Board

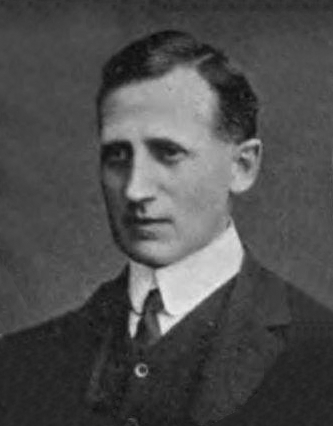
F. B. L. Bowley.

Francis Bulmer Lyon Bowley was a Hong Kong solicitor and member of the Sanitary Board.

== Career ==
Born in Bristol on 24 January 1868, and educated at Bristol Grammar School, Bowley went to Hong Kong in 1893 as an associate at Henry Lardner Dennys Senior's solicitors firm. He later became a partner of the firm in the name of Dennys & Bowley. When Dennys retired in 1913, his son Henry Lardner Dennys Junior, Charles Bulmer Johnson became partners of the firm with Bowley.

He acted as the Crown Solicitor from around 1899 during the absence of Henry Lardner Dennys. He subsequently succeeded Dennys in the post of Crown Solicitor and held the post for many years.

Bowley was elected member of the Sanitary Board in the 1912 election. He was interested in subjects such as factory legislation and the conditions of the employment of women and children.

He also involved in the church affairs and had served on the Church Body and acted as Treasure of the St. John's Cathedral.

Bowley returned to England by RMS Empress of Russia on 28 April 1921.

Political offices
Preceded by A. Shelton Hooper	Member of the Sanitary Board; 1912–1914	Succeeded by P. W. Goldring
