= William Leonard Carter =

British businessman and army officer

- Born: 1877; Shanghai
- Died: 4 July 1917 (aged 39–40); Military Hospital, Hong Kong
- Education: St. Paul's School, London
- Occupations: businessman army officer

William Leonard Carter, R.E. (1877 – 4 July 1917) was a British businessman and army officer.

== Early life ==
He was born in Shanghai in 1877 was educated at St. Paul's School, London. He continued his studies in technical direction at the Central Technical College.

Carter served as a 2nd Lieutenant in the East Lancashire Regiment during the South African War. Later he moved to Hong Kong and joined the China and Japan Telephone Company as a local agent and manager for 13 years. He was keen on forming the Hong Kong Local Centre of the Institution and became the first Chairman of the Local Centre in 1915.

== Army officer ==
On 15 August 1914, he became an adjutant of the Hong Kong Volunteer Reserves with the local rank of Captain during the First World War. He later resigned from the post and became the officer commanding of the Royal Engineers stores.

== Personal life and death ==
On 8 January 1906, he married Maud Louisa Harrow, daughter of Edwin Harlow, of London, at the Peak Church. On 30 March 1911, their first daughter was born at Bishop's Lodge on Lugard Road. Their second daughter was born in Alderleyedge on 7 October 1912.

He died from enteric fever at the Military Hospital in Hong Kong on 4 July 1917. His funeral was held at the Hong Kong Cemetery, about 700 to 800 people attended, including governor Sir Henry May. He was buried there.
