= John Cecil Macgown =

John Cecil Macgown was a Scottish doctor in Hong Kong and member of the sanitary board.

Educated at the University of Edinburgh, he received his MD in 1928.

Macgown went to Hong Kong and was the principal of the medical firm of Macgown, Anderson, and Durran and principal medical officer of China Underwriters, Ltd.. He was on the consulting staff of the Alice Memorial Hospital and affiliated hospital and member of the New Territories medical benevolent branch of the St. John Ambulance Brigade. Dr. Macgown served in the Hong Kong Volunteer Defence Corps, holding the rank of major in the medical section of the corps from 1914 to 1918 during the First World War.

Macgown was the president of the Hong Kong St. Andrew's Society. He was an amateur rider and owner and chairman of the Fanling Hunt and Race Club and a steward of the Hong Kong Jockey Club. He had a string of ponies participating in the races in both Happy Valley Racecourse and Kwanti Racecourse. He was one of the leading steeplechasers and also a keen amateur airman.

Macgown was married and had two children, Heather and Sandy. He left Hong Kong with his family in 1936 for home by the Blue Funnel liner HMS Hector and settled down in practise at home.

Political offices
Preceded by F. M. G. Ozorio	Member of the Sanitary Board; 1924–1927	Succeeded by José Pedro Braga
