= C. Grenville Alabaster =

Barrister-at-Law, Inner Temple

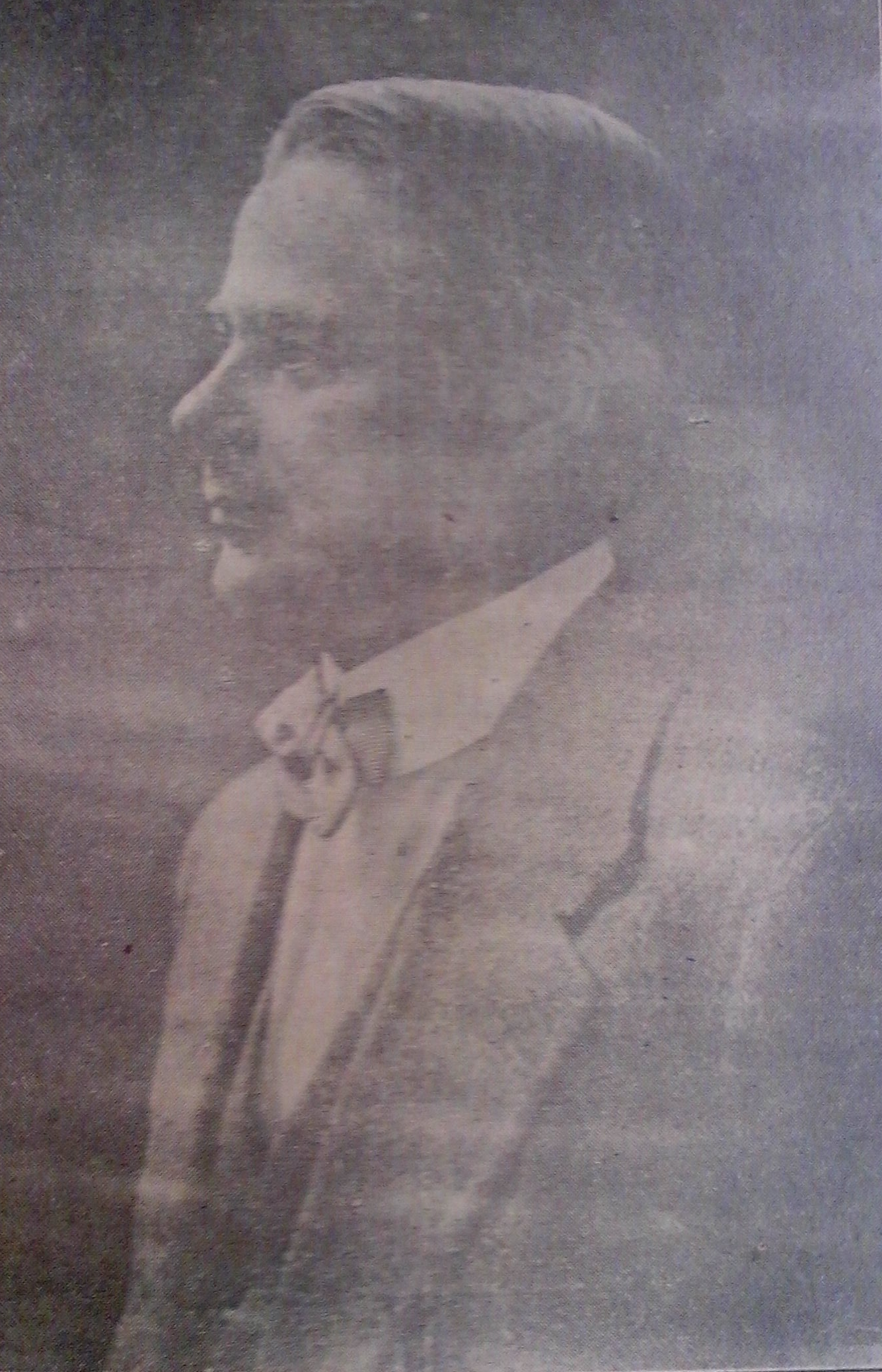
C. Grenville Alabaster, Attorney General of Hong Kong

Sir Chaloner Grenville Alabaster, OBE, QC (1880–1958) was a British lawyer who served as Attorney General of Hong Kong in the 1930s.

== Early life ==
Alabaster was born in Hankow, the son of Chaloner Alabaster, a British consular official in China.

He was educated at Tonbridge School He was called to the bar of the Inner Temple in 1904 and practised on the Western Circuit until 1909. In 1907 he published a book the Law Relating to the Transactions of Money-lenders and Borrowers.

A newspaper of the time when describing him mentioned his "consummate skill", "very few young men have commanded the admiration of so many intelligent people" and "he is a young man of great intellectual distinction and is endowed with a judgement of rare clearness and sagacity"

While in London he served as secretary of the China Association.

In 1909, he married Mabel Winifred Mary, M.B.E daughter of Col E.P. Mainwaring of the Indian Army.

== Practice in Hong Kong and China ==
In 1909, Alabaster left England to practice as a barrister in Hong Kong.

In September 1913, he was admitted to practice before the British Supreme Court for China in Shanghai in a hearing whereby special dispensation he was allowed not to be present. Alabaster had been in Shanghai the week before his admission and was returning the week after. The Acting Judge, FSA Bourne, was not in Shanghai when Alabaster was there so allowed his admission to be moved in his absence. In 1915, he appeared in the United States Court for China As a barrister admitted to the British Supreme Court for China, by courtesy, he was allowed to appear before the United States Court for China.

In 1913, Alabaster revised the Ordinances of Hong Kong

He served on the Sanitary Board and during World War I served as Deputy Cable Censor He received an O.B.E. in 1918 for his services in connection with the Cable Censorate.

He was appointed a King's Counsel in Hong Kong in 1922 and was said to be described by the legal profession as a "very sound lawyer"

== Legal Appointments ==
Alabaster acted as Attorney General of Hong Kong for periods in 1911, 1912 and 1928. He was also an unofficial member of the Hong Kong Legislative Council in 1919, 1924 and 1925.

In 1930, he was appointed Attorney General of Hong Kong, succeeding Joseph Horsford Kemp.

Alabaster acted as Chief Justice of Hong Kong in 1937.

Alabaster was interned by the Japanese at Stanley Internment Camp from 1941 to 1945. Alabaster said that as a result of the war he has lost "furniture, household goods, silver, cutlery, glass, carpets, pictures, clothes, bedding ... jewelry, motor car, wireless set, masonic regalia etc ... all looted by the Japanese."

He was knighted in 1942 whilst in internment.

== Retirement ==
Alabaster retired at the end of the war and returned to England. He settled in Southbourne, Bournemouth.

A family postcard described his condition post-war:

"Sir Grenville came to lunch on Sunday – he was almost blind by then, probably partly to do with deprivation when in prison camp (Japanese). His sisters used to read him the Times Crossword when he arrived – after lunch, he would give them the answers."

He died on 10 September 1958 in Hampshire, England.

Legislative Council of Hong Kong
Preceded by Henry Edward Pollock	Provisional Unofficial Member; Representative for Justices of the Peace; 1919	Succeeded by Henry Edward Pollock
Preceded by Henry Edward Pollock	Provisional Unofficial Member; Representative for Justices of the Peace; 1924	Succeeded by Henry Edward Pollock
Preceded by Henry Edward Pollock	Provisional Unofficial Member; Representative for Justices of the Peace; 1925	Succeeded by Henry Edward Pollock
Political offices
Preceded by Philip Wallace Goldring	Member of the Sanitary Board; 1917–1926	Succeeded by Ho Sai-chuen
Legal offices
Preceded by Joseph Horsford Kemp	Attorney General of Hong Kong; 1930–1941	Japanese occupation of Hong Kong
