= P. W. Goldring =

English lawyer and politician (1875-1928)

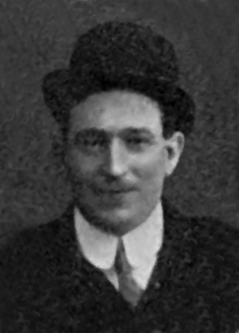
P. W. Goldring.

Philip Wallace Goldring (15 March 1875 – 13 May 1928) was an English solicitor in Hong Kong and Shanghai and member of the Sanitary Board.

== Early life ==
Goldring was born on 15 March 1875 in Crouch End, Middlesex, England. He was educated at the Working School and Clifton College. He obtained his Bachelor of Arts from the Trinity College, Oxford in classical moderations and in the final school of jurisprudence in 1896. He was admitted to practice as a solicitor in 1899 in England.

== Career in Hong Kong and Shanghai ==
Goldring moved to Hong Kong in 1903 to join the local law firm Brutton, Hett and Goldring until in April 1906 he started to practise on his own account. He was the head of the Goldring & Morrell, and also the Goldring and Russ solicitors firm, until He moved to Shanghai in around 1920 after living 17 years in Hong Kong.

During his residence in Hong Kong, he was elected to the Sanitary Board in 1914 by-election caused by the absence of the incumbent F. B. L. Bowley from Hong Kong. Goldring defeated W. L. Carter in the election with 142 to 33 votes.

During the First World War, Goldring served with the Hong Kong Volunteer Corps for one year. He was also connected with the Chinese Labour Corps for six months and served with the Hong Kong Police Reserve for two years afterward.

After he moved to Shanghai, he joined the Supreme Court of the Shanghai International Settlement. He was subsequently appointed second legal adviser to E. T. Maitland, Prosecuting Solicitor of the Shanghai Municipal Council, due to his work in the Shanghai Provisional Court. Goldring later became the Assistant Prosecuting Solicitor for the Council in November 1926.

== Personal life ==
Goldring was an enthusiastic sportsman. He played football, cricket, shooting and fishing and was member of the Hong Kong Club and the Sports Club, London. He married Miss Luchung on 29 January 1919 from a well-known and popular family among the younger generation of local Chinese. He lived at "Parkside", Kowloon during his residence in Hong Kong.

He died on 13 May 1928 in Shanghai after a short illness. Tributes was paid by Judge Liang Lone and C. E. Whitemore in the Supreme Court of Shanghai after his death.

Political offices
Preceded by F. B. L. Bowley	Member of the Sanitary Board; 1914–1917	Succeeded by C. G. Alabaster
