= F. M. G. Ozorio =

Filomeno Maria Graca Ozorio, M.B., B.S., L.M.S. (7 March 1892 – 13 February 1937) was a Hong Kong Portuguese doctor and member of the Sanitary Board.

== Biography ==
Ozorio was born in Hong Kong on 7 March 1892 and graduated from the St. Joseph's College, Hong Kong in 1907. He attended to the Hong Kong College of Medicine, where he studied under Dr. Gibson and Dr. Francis Clark. He gained his Licentiate in Medicine and Surgery in 1912 at the age of 20 just before the Hong Kong College of Medicine was merged in the Medical Faculty of the University of Hong Kong. In the following two years, he gained his Bachelor of Medicine and Bachelor of Science degrees and was admitted to become a medical practitioner in Hong Kong.

Ozorio served three times on the Sanitary Board. He was first elected in the Sanitary Board election in February 1916. He was at 24 years of age that time, becoming the first Portuguese and the youngest member ever sit on the board. He served on the board for nine years until he resigned in 1925. In the 1926 Sanitary Board election, he ran against Dr. S. C. Ho, son of Ho Fook and nephew of Sir Robert Ho Tung and failed to get back to the board.

Ozorio was the president of the Club Lusitano, an elite Portuguese club, from 1933 to 1937 until his death. He was responsible for the annual celebrations of the Portuguese National Day, commemorating the declaration of the Republic. He was also involved in the Club de Recreio and was consul for Costa Rica in Hong Kong.

Ozorio was a witness of the appalling typhoon in 1906. He was an enthusiastic race-goer and was present at the catastrophe on the Happy Valley Racecourse in 1918. He engaged in first-aid work for those who were rescued from the flames. He was also present at the burning of the steamer Hankow at the Canton Steamer Wharf when some hundreds of people perished.

Ozorio died at the Kowloon Hospital on 13 February 1937 at the age of 45, leaving his wife Ruth Yvonne Barreto, daughter of F. Demee Barretto of Singapore, and three daughters, Ismeria, Maria and Desiree and one son, Filoneno. The funeral took place at the St. Michael's Catholic Cemetery, Happy Valley on the next day. The flag of the Club Lusitano was flown at half mast for two days after his death.

Political offices
Preceded by Gerard H. L. Fitzwilliams	Member of the Sanitary Board; 1916–1924	Succeeded by John Cecil Macgown
