= 1896 Hong Kong Sanitary Board plebiscite =

- 16 May 1896
- Whether the Sanitary Board should consist of a majority of officials or of unofficials?

Results
Choice	Votes	%
Unofficial majority	331	91.44%
Official majority	31	8.56%
Valid votes	362	100.00%
Invalid or blank votes	0	0.00%
Total votes	362	100.00%
Registered voters/turnout	788	45.94%
- Results by Colony
- Unofficial majority Official majority

A plebiscite on whether the Sanitary Board should have an official or unofficial majority was held in Hong Kong in June 1896. The result of the plebiscite was overwhelmingly for unofficial majority, however no constitutional changes were made for Sanitary Board, though the constitutions of the Executive and Legislative Council were changed as unofficial members were added as a result.

The 1896 plebiscite is on record the only referendum conducted by the Hong Kong Government (Note: The other de facto referendum launched by the pro-democracy camp through the by-election in 2010 was not officially recognised.) and could be seen as part of the first major debate on the constitutional reform in the crown colony during the 1890s. It was much earlier than the Governor Mark Aitchison Young's Young Plan in the 1940s and 1950s and the rise of the modern pro-democracy camp in the 1980s.

== Background ==
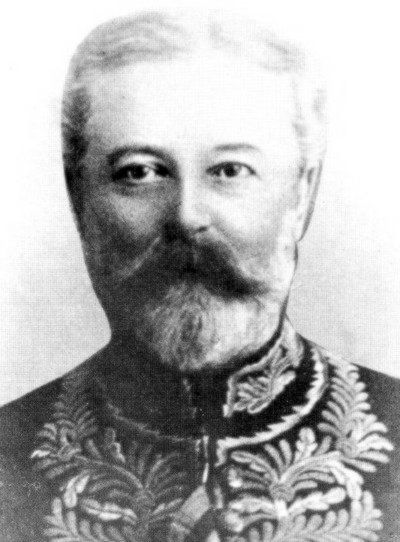
Sir William Robinson, Governor of Hong Kong (1891–1898)

The Sanitary Board was established in 1883 in responsible of improving the sanitary conditions in the city as the result of Osbert Chadwick's report in 1881 advised.

Under the 1887 Public Health Ordinance, the Board was composed of four official members and no more than six unofficial members, and that four official members should be appointed by the Governor (two of them being Chinese) and two elected by the ratepayers who were on the jury lists of the election year. Three elections were held in 1888, 1891 and 1894 respectively.

The bubonic plague of 1894 raised the question of the composition and powers of the Board. The Government's decision of appointing a Medical Officer of Health to the Board in 1895 was against the will of the unofficial members. J. J. Francis, the three times elected member resigned, and other three unofficial members Ho Kai, William Hartigan and Robert Kennaway Leigh followed.

The members of the Executive Council and the Chamber of Commerce were dissatisfied the sanitation and ineffectiveness of the Board. Prominent leaders including J. J. Keswick of the Chamber of Commerce, Paul Chater and E. R. Belilios were in favour of an official majority while the officers directly responsible to the Governor. Contrast to the abolition of the Board, Ho Kai represented another opinion of maintaining the unofficial majority and larger power of the unofficial members. Governor William Robinson shared the same view with the former, insisted that a Medical Department with a Principal Civil Medical Officer directly under the Government should replace the Sanitary Board.

With regard of the reconstitution of the Sanitary Board, Governor William Robinson conducted a plebiscite in June 1896.

Besides the reconstitution of the Sanitary Board issues, in 1894 there was a group of petitioners supported by the Unofficial Members of the Legislative Council Paul Chater and Ho Kai with 363 signatures asked for a further representations in the Colonial Government. They demanded:

1. The free election of representatives of British nationality in the Legislative Council of the Colony.
2. A majority in the Council of such elected representatives
3. Perfect freedom of debate for the Official Members with power to vote according to their conscientious convictions.
4. Complete control in the Council over local expenditure.
5. The management of local affairs.
6. A consultative voice in questions of an Imperial character.

In the letter to the Secretary of State Lord Ripon on 5 June 1894, Governor William Robinson addressed:

I believe that the Chinese, who are indifferently represented, and the Portuguese, who are not represented at all, if a plebiscite could be taken, would be in favour of a pure autocracy; the Americans need not to be counted, and the "Britishers" with the exception of a few "unquiet spirits" would be satisfied to let matters remain as they are.

Although the Governor and the Acting Colonial Secretary Stewart Lockhart, J. J. Keswick and E. R. Belilios opposed the reform, Lord Ripon agreed with increasing the number of unofficial members in the Legislative Council, introducing unofficial element into the Executive Council and creating a Municipal Council.

== Polling ==
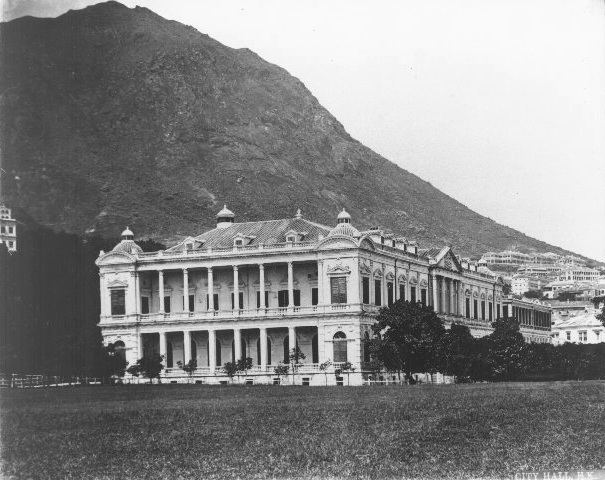
The City Hall, where the elections of the Sanitary Board took place.

A plebiscite was held on 16 May 1896 and the question submitted to the voters being whether the Sanitary Board should consist of a majority of officials or of unofficials.

The electorates were limited to persons only on the jury lists of the year. There were 788 persons in total out of the 250,000 population in Hong Kong and 362 votes were cast. Most of entitled voters were from the British community. Among them there were three or four Chinese voted for the unofficials and none voted for the officials. Although the majority of the Chinese population was unrepresented, the result was overwhelmingly favour for the unofficial majority.

Choice	Votes	%
Unofficial majority	331	91.44
Official majority	31	8.56
Total	362	100.00
Total votes	362	–
Registered voters/turnout	788	45.94
Source: Sessional Paper

== Aftermath ==
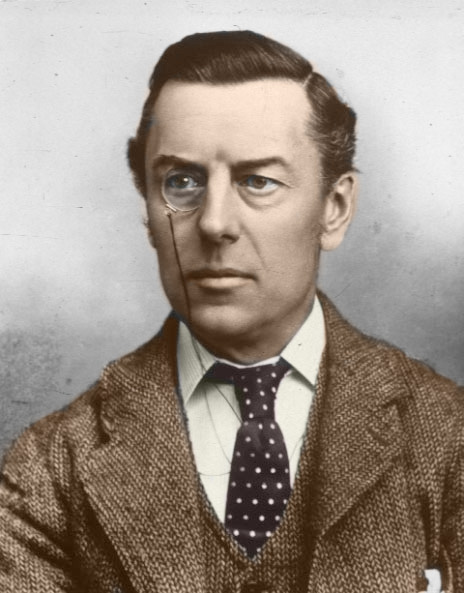
Joseph Chamberlain, Secretary of State for the Colonies (1895–1903).

Although the plebiscite showed a clear view for unofficial majority, Robinson still insisted to have sanitary affairs placed directly under Government control.

The then Secretary of State Joseph Chamberlain was not pleased with the Governor's decision of a plebiscite and stated that "it is inconsistent with Crown Colony government to seek the guidance of a plebiscite; and in no community whatever whether Crown Colony or not, can a satisfactory solution of a question, in which the whole body of the ratepayers and many outside that body are interested, be induced from an expression of the opinions of one section alone." Moreover, in this case the plebiscite had led to a result which was opposed to the Governor's own advice.

Chamberlain refused any constitutional changes to the Sanitary Board. The election for the unofficial members resumed in 1899. The Sanitary Department was not established until the Public Health and Buildings Ordinance was passed in 1903.

Hong Kong had to wait until 1936 and the creation of the Urban Council for any further advance toward a municipal council.

Nevertheless, the other two suggestions by Lord Ripon were soon carried out, an unofficial member and an official member appointed to the Legislative Council respectively and two unofficial members who were the senior members the Legislative Council appointed to the Executive Council.

Wei Yuk was the newly appointed unofficial member to the Legislative Council as one of the two Chinese representative alongside Ho Kai who had been the member since 1890. Paul Chater and Jardine representative John Bell-Irving were the new unofficial members appointed to the Executive Council.
