= 1909 Hong Kong sanitary board election =

- 20 January 1909
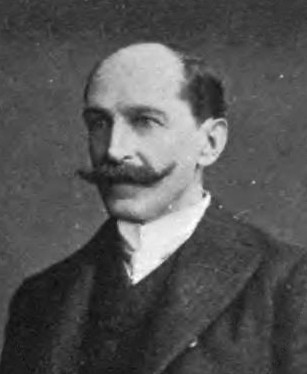

| Nominee | A. Shelton Hooper | Gerard H. L. Fitzwilliams |
| Party | Nonpartisan | Nonpartisan |
| Popular vote | 504 | 343 |
| Percentage | 38.0% | 25.8% |
| Nominee | R. A. Belilios | H. Percy Smith |
| Party | Nonpartisan | Nonpartisan |
| Popular vote | 313 | 167 |
| Percentage | 23.6% | 12.6% |
Members before election
Henry Humphreys
A. Shelton Hooper
Elected Members
A. Shelton Hooper
Gerard H. L. Fitzwilliams

The 1909 Hong Kong Sanitary Board election was held on 20 January 1909 was an election for the two unofficial seats in the Sanitary Board of Hong Kong. It was the first election with more than two contestants since the 1903 election.

An Amendment of the Public Health and Buildings Ordinance passed in 1908 by the Legislative Council slightly extended the electorate, reorganised the powers of the Board and officially defined the jurisdictions of the Board were Hong Kong Island, Kowloon and New Kowloon.

It was the first election with more than two contestants since 1903. Four candidates ran in the election and among them Augustus Shelton Hooper and G. H. L. Fitzwilliams were elected.

== Result ==
| Names | Votes |
|---|---|
| Mr. Augustus Shelton Hooper | 504 |
| Dr. Gerard Hall Lloyd Fitzwilliams | 343 |
| Dr. Raphael Aaron Belilios | 313 |
| Mr. Horace Percy Smith | 167 |
