= 1888 Hong Kong sanitary board election =

11 June 1888	1891 →
- Registered: 669
- Turnout: 187 (27.95%)
Nominee	J. D. Humphreys	J. J. Francis
Party	Nonpartisan	Nonpartisan
Popular vote	71	55
Percentage	37.97%	29.41%
Nominee	Robert K. Leigh	Alexander McConachie
Party	Nonpartisan	Nonpartisan
Popular vote	43	18
Percentage	22.99%	9.63%
Elected Members
J. D. Humphreys
J. J. Francis

The 1888 Hong Kong Sanitary Board election was held on 11 June 1888 for the two unofficial seats in the Sanitary Board of Hong Kong.

Sanitary Board was set up in 1883 to supervise and control the practical sanitation of the colony. As its work involved interference with the private affairs of residents it was unpopular with property owners and with the Chinese generally. It could however only make proposals. Their implementation was a matter for the Government.

Originally it consisted solely of official members but subsequently provision was made for nominated unofficial members, and two members elected by ratepayers on the special and common jury lists. Of the 669 persons on the jury lists for the year, 213 voted, with 187 valid ballots and 23 spoiled ballots.

It was the first ever election held in the history of Hong Kong. The elections continued as the Sanitary Board transformed into the Urban Council in 1936 and marked the beginning of the Hong Kong constitutional reform in the post-war period. The Daily Press hailed the occasion saying the day would be ranked as a day of note by the future historians of Hong Kong; for the first time the ratepayers of the Colony had been given a voice in the management of their own affairs.

One of the candidates J. J. Francis was a leading member of the Hong Kong Association founded in 1893 for improving and popularising the Government.

== Overview of outcome ==
Sanitary Board Election 1888
Party	Candidate	Votes	%	±%
Nonpartisan	John David Humphreys	71	37.97	
Nonpartisan	J. J. Francis	55	29.41	
Nonpartisan	Robert Kennaway Leigh	43	22.99	
Nonpartisan	Alexander McConachie	18	9.63	
Turnout		187	27.95	
Registered electors		669		
