= Gerard H. L. Fitzwilliams =

British doctor and spy (1882–1968)

Dr. Gerard Hall Lloyd Fitzwilliams, M.D., Ch.B., F.R.C.S., EDIN. (1882 – 8 April 1968) was a British physician worked in Hong Kong and a spy in Russia.

== Early career ==
Dr. Fitzwilliams was born in around Llandyfriog, Cardiganshire, Wales in 1882 to the son of Charles Home Lloyd Fitzwilliams and Margaret Alice Crawford. He graduated from the Edinburgh University with the Bachelor of Medicine and Surgery and Doctor of Medicine in 1903 and 1904 respectively. He was the Fellow of the Royal College of Surgeons of Edinburgh. He later took an postgraduate course in hygiene and sanitation at the London School of Tropical Medicine, specialised in conditions in warm and tropical climates in the guidance of Professor Simpson who was sent to the Inquiry Commission in Hong Kong on the Public Health and Regulations Ordinance in 1906. During 1905 and 1906, he was a house surgeon at the Glasgow Royal Infirmary.

Dr. Fitzwilliams moved to Hong Kong in around 1906 and 1907 to start a private practice at the Alexandra Building in Central. He registered as a medical practitioner in around 1908 and 1909. He asked his colleague at the Glasgow Royal Infirmary, James Cyril Dalmahoy Allan, to join his practice in 1909. Dr. Fitzwilliams taught Practical Physiology and Pathology at the Hong Kong College of Medicine for Chinese from 1908 and 1909 and Anatomy from 1909 to 1912.

He ran in the 1909 Sanitary Board election after the Sanitary Board was reconstituted with a larger franchise as suggested by the Commission Report. He was elected with 343 votes with A. Shelton Hooper, the incumbent Sanitary Board member against Dr. Raphael Aaron Belilios and Horace Percy Smith. He was re-elected in 1912 and 1915.

He resided in a suite at the Peak Hotel during his residence in Hong Kong, which he shared with Allan.

== First World War ==
Dr. Fitzwilliams returned to Britain and joined the Royal Army Medical Corps during the First World War. He was sent to Petrograd to work for his brother, Duncan Campbell Lloyd Fitzwilliams who headed Lady Muriel Paget's Anglo-Russian Hospital. During that time he was also recruited as an operative of the British Secret Intelligence Service between 1915 and 1917. In 1917, Fitzwilliams returned to Russia under the cover of a member of the Anglo-Russian Trade Mission. He was tasked with collecting intelligence about military and political positions of the nations in the Eastern Front and also sought to turn the side of from Ukraine from the Central Power when he moved to Southern Russia and then to Romania. Fitzwilliams left the Eastern Front by the end of 1918 and returned to Hong Kong. He died in 1968.
