= J. J. Francis =

Hong Kong lawyer (1839–1901)

John Joseph Francis

Unofficial Member of the Sanitary Board
- In office June 1888 – April 1895

Personal details
- Born: 25 April 1839 Dublin, Ireland, United Kingdom
- Died: 22 September 1901 (aged 62) Yokohama, Japan
- Resting place: St. Michael's Catholic Cemetery
- Spouse: Anne Shirley
- Education: Beaumont Lodge, Gray's Inn, London University
- Occupation: Solicitor, barrister and politician

John Joseph Francis KC (25 April 1839 – 22 September 1901) was a barrister in British Hong Kong and the first elected member of the Sanitary Board.

== Early life ==
Francis was born in Dublin in 1839, the eldest son of William Francis Aylward, an Inspector of Irish National Schools, and Teresa Agnes Redmond. His father died in 1847, as did two of his four younger brothers. He attended the Jesuit boarding schools in Ireland from 1852 to 57 and then the Jesuit Novitiate at Beaumont Lodge, Windsor. It appears that he intended to train for the priesthood but in the end of the 1850s he joined the Royal Artillery and came to China in 1859. He stationed in Hong Kong and after a time he left the army and settled down as a civilian.

== Legal career ==
He was admitted as proctor, attorney and solicitor in January 1869. His admission was moved by the Attorney General, Julian Pauncefote before the Chief Justice of the Supreme Court, J. J. Smale. The Chinese name for his firm was Fa Lan Shea Shi Chong Sz. He built up a remunerative practice but decided to sell his practice to M. J. D. Stephens, his managing clerk, in December 1873 and studied to be called to the Bar.

In January 1874 Francis was admitted to the Gray's Inn. He matriculated at the London University in 1875 and passed the Intermediate Examination in Laws, obtaining first place of those candidates who achieved second class at honours in 1876. In the same year he won the Lee Essay Prize at the Gray's Inn with the subject "The Judicature Act 1873, stating its object and provisions generally and its probable effect on the administration of the law in England." He was called to the Bar in November 1876.

Francis returned to Hong Kong and was admitted to practise at the Hong Kong Bar in March 1877, being the 27th on the Roll. His admission was moved by the Attorney General George Phillippo before J. J. Smale. Shortly after his own admission Francis signed an affidavit in support of the application of Ng Choy the first Chinese to be admitted to practise in Hong Kong.

In 1881, Francis was appointed Acting Crown Advocate of the British Supreme Court for China and Japan to prosecute a British employee of the Imperial Maritime Customs, Edward Page who was accused of murder for killing a Chinese smuggler. Thomas Hayllar QC and the Attorney General of Hong Kong, Edward Loughlin O'Malley, acted for Page.

Francis quickly became an established barrister in the colony and became the leading practitioner at the Bar when T. C. Hayllar, QC the most prominent barrister in the colony left in 1882. In 1886, he became the third barrister in Hong Kong to be a Queen's Counsel.

According to the newspaper reports of his cases Francis comes across as a forceful, and often pugnacious and outspoken, advocate who took every possible point for his clients and never gave up, although "his outspoken utterances estranged many person who would otherwise have employed him in Court," as the Hong Kong Telegraph commented.

He was appointed acting in several judicial positions from 1878 to 1880 including Police Magistrate in September 1878 and 1880, Puisne Judge of the Supreme Court in April 1879 and presiding over the Criminal Sessions in February 1880. He was appointed member of the commission to Revise the Laws and Ordinances of Hong Kong in 1887 and also examiner of candidates for admission as attorneys both when he was solicitor and barrister. However he was never appointed acting Attorney General and Chief Justice.

== Public affairs ==
Francis was a member of the Hong Kong General Chamber of Commerce, the China Association and the Navy League, and in 1895 accepted and presidency of the British Mercantile Marine Officers Association.

He was involved with a number of organisations founded for the benefit of the Chinese. In 1878 a number of Chinese, concerned about the traffic in women and girls, petitioned the Governor for permission to form an anti-kidnapping association. The Governor John Pope Hennessy appointed a committee of four, including Francis, to investigate the matter. In the result the Po Leung Kuk, or Society for the Protection of the Innocent, was formed in 1880. Francis drafted rules and regulations for the running of the Society.

Francis was also a member of the financial committee of the Alice Memorial Hospital founded by a prominent Chinese, Ho Kai, in 1886. With Ho Kai, Francis laid the foundation of the Hong Kong College of Medicine for Chinese which later on became the University of Hong Kong. One of the two original students of the college was Sun Yat Sen. On the day Francis' death the college passed a resolution expressing appreciation of his services. He also acted as an examiner of the Catholic school, St. Joseph's College and a regular guest of the Prizegiving Day at the school.

He joined the Hong Kong Volunteer Corps which was founded in 1862 but disbanded in 1866 and was revived under John Hennessy's governorship. He was an artillery member was elected as captain. He remained an active member until 1887 and maintain his until his death.

== Politics ==
Francis was ever an outspoken critic of the government. He was considered by Governor William Robinson as one of his principal opponents. However his wholehearted support of Governor Hennessy, who was also an Irish Roman Catholic, was criticised by the opposition of the Hennessian government.

=== Legislative Council elections ===
In the late 19th century there were five unofficial members on the Legislative Council in which one of them was elected by the Justices of Peace and another by the Hong Kong General Chamber of Commerce. In 1886, Francis was a candidate for the seat on the Legislative Council elected by the Justices, proposed by Phineas Ryrie who said "the meetings of the Council will be made very more interesting by his presence." He stated his interest in running the office on newspaper by saying "I honestly believe I can do the colony good and faithful service and better than any other man. I am nearly one of the oldest residents. I came here in 1859. Since 1862 I have taken a lively and I hope intelligent interest in the affairs of the colony. I have some knowledge of business and its requirements and am deeply interested in the prosperity and progress of Hong Kong as a whole. It is my home, my life's work is here and I rise or fall with its fortunes." However he was defeated by Paul Chater by 35 votes to 15 due to his constant opposition to the government and sympathy to Hennessy.

In May 1888 Ryrie again proposed Francis as the member of the Legislative Council for the Hong Kong General Chamber of Commerce saying that the unofficial members felt the need for someone who could advise them on legal points of order. Francis was again defeated by Bendyshe Layton by 20 votes to 16. The Daily Press in an editorial commented that Francis was a man of wide experience outside his profession but no-one would ever know what he was going to do next.

Francis maintained his interest in the reform of the Legislative Council and the introduction of representative government. In 1889 in a lecture on Crown Colonies he expressed a hope for an elected Council, and he was a leading member of the Hong Kong Association founded in 1893 for improving and popularising the Government. That was followed in 1894 by a petition to the Home Government for constitutional reform.

=== Sanitary Board ===
The Sanitary Board was established in 1883 to supervise and control the sanitation of the colony but was unpopular with the property owners and the Chinese community. It initially consisted of solely official members but provision was made for nominated unofficial members and two members elected by the ratepayers on the special and common jury lists.

In the first election held in June 1888, there were four contestants including Francis who was elected with 55 votes with John D. Humphreys 71 votes while Robert K. Leigh and A. MacConachie were defeated with 43 and 18 votes respectively. Francis remained member, being re-elected in 1891 and 1894, until his resignation in 1895. He was regarded as capable, conscientious and unselfish by Granville Sharp. However, Francis considered the Sanitary Board did not have sufficient powers and independence to make it an effective body.

In May 1894 bubonic plague struck Hong Kong and a permanent committee of the Sanitary Board, comprising three members with Francis as chairman, was set up to cope with the emergency. The Governor paid tribute to Francis's service by saying that the permanent committee acted with extraordinary energy and efficiency and the government was indebted to him and others in a dispatch to the Secretary of State Lord Ripon. In September 1894 a committee was appointed with Edward Ackroyd the chairman to decide on awards to be made for the services during the plague on behalf of the community. The general expectation was Francis Henry May, the Captain Superintendent of Police who served on the permanent committee and Francis would be rewarded in the same way. The Governor wrote to the Secretary of State expressed that "it was easily earned" if Francis received the Companion of the Order of St Michael and St George (C.M.G.), as suggested by May. In the end, May was rewarded the C.M.G. and Francis was offered merely a silver inkstand. The decision of the government aroused a wide discussion in the colony and many of them went with Francis.

After the emergency of the plague was over in September 1894 the Sanitary Board was attacked by the Daily Press as incompetent and despotic. In early 1895 the government decided to appoint an additional official member, the Medical Officer of Health, to the Sanitary Board. Francis and said he would be a government spy. He subsequently resigned with Robert K. Leigh as protest and was followed by Ho Kai and William Hartigan. To settle the issue Governor William Robinson went on for a plebiscite in 1896 and the result was 331 votes to 31 votes for an unofficial majority in the Sanitary Board.

=== Other appointments ===
He was also appointed by the government to the committees formed to organise the celebration of the Queen Victoria's Golden and Diamond Jubilees. In the end the committee decided on a statue which is now in Victoria Park. He was awarded the Governor's Jubilee medal for his services. He was also on the Hong Kong Golden Jubilee committee. He attended a number of the protest meetings which were a feature of life in Hong Kong, and usually had something to say. His last public appointment was as chairman of the Food Supply Commission in 1900.

== Death ==
Francis had a serious illness towards the end of 1895 and had trouble with his health thereafter. In August 1901, after making a new will, he went to Yokohama to seek refreshment. He died at the Grand Hotel on 22 September, the cause of death being given as apoplexy. On 25 September both branches of the legal profession met at the Supreme Court to pay tribute to him.

A full choral funeral service was conducted by Bishop Piazzoli at St. Michael's Roman Catholic Cemetery in Happy Valley on 30 October. Among those present being the then Colonial Secretary James Stewart Lockhart, Sir Thomas Jackson, Paul Chater and Ho Kai.

His grave is surmounted by a simple cross on a stepped plinth and bears the inscription, reading from top to bottom, "R.I.P. Sacred to the memory of John Joseph Francis K.C. Born at Dublin 25th April 1839. Died at Yokohama 22nd September 1901. Blessed are the dead who die in the Lord from henceforth now saith the Spirit that they may rest from their labours".

== Personal life ==
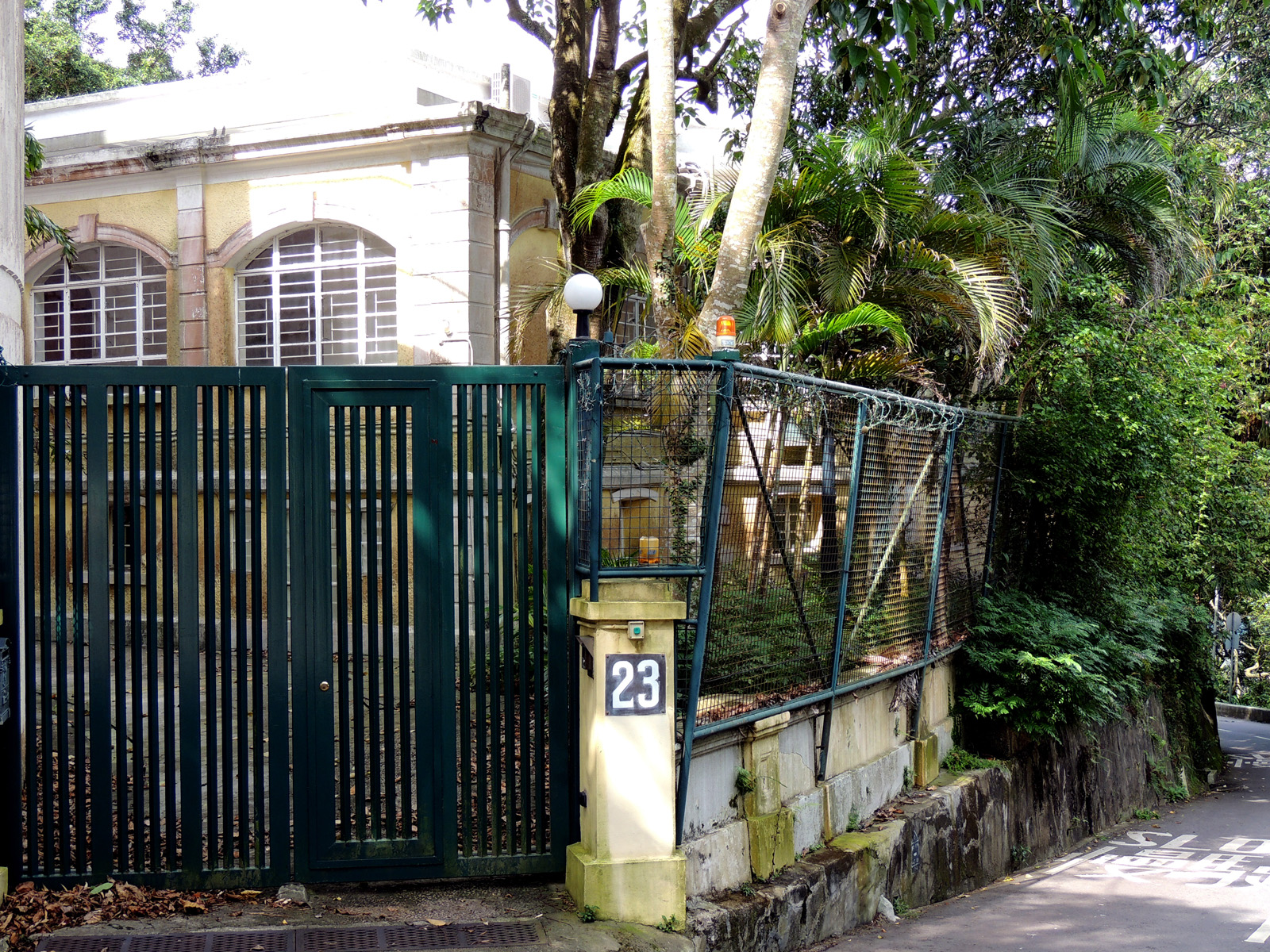
Stonyhurst, the house he built on 23 Coombe Road is a Grade I Historic Building since 2011.

He was one of the leading Roman Catholic laymen in Hong Kong and regularly attended church services and functions. He spoke against the prejudice towards Catholics from the English non-Catholics. He also saw Bishop Raimondi, Roman Catholic Bishop of Hong Kong, as a dear friend and an educator in the path of duty for more than twenty years.

He married his first wife Anne Shirley in July 1864, who was born in England in 1824. She was a Protestant so they had two ceremonies, one at St. John's Anglican Cathedral performed by the Rev. J. J. Irwin, the colonial chaplain, and one in the sacristy of the Roman Catholic Church performed by Father Raimondi. She died at Bournemouth in March 1890. He remarried to a German lady in Colombo in December 1890. She left Hong Kong in 1902 and went to live in Germany where she died in 1912.

Francis was an inveterate lecturer until his death. He lectured on various subjects in the Chamber of Commerce and the City Hall ranging from Jesuitism in 1872 through maritime and Asian affairs to the theory of British Advocacy in 1897. He was also member of many clubs and societies. He was a founding member of the Hong Kong Jockey Club and secretary of its first rule committee. He was also a member of the Gun Club and the Rifle Association. He joined various literary and debating societies. In 1897 he took part in the founding of the St. Cecilia Society established to cultivate a taste for music and was its president. He also supported Dr. James Cantlie in the formation of the Odd Volumes Society in 1893. He played chess and kept open house in his chambers for chess players at 4.30 p.m. on Wednesdays. In 1894 he was involved in a living chess tournament organised to raise funds for the Union Church and held in the grounds of J.J. Keswick at East Point.

Francis purchased the island of Balambangar when he visited Borneo in 1889 and planned to grow tobacco on the island. He also acquired an interest in the Hongkong Telegraph upon Robert Frazer-Smith's death in 1895 which he retained until 1900 and directed the policy of the newspaper during the period. He was also proprietor of The China Mail for a time.

Francis worked and lived at a number of addresses in Hong Kong. The first address was 2 Mosque Street. He worked at 2 Club Chambers, D'Aguilar Street, and continued there after being admitted as a solicitor. He lived in Alexandra Terrace in 1872 and 1 Caine Road in 1873. After his admission to practise at the Bar he had his chambers in Bank Buildings. He lived in a house in Bonham Road variously called Sunnyside and Shirley House. In 1887 he was living in Seymour Terrace. In that year he had a house, which he called Stonyhurst, built in what is now Coombe Road. In 1889 he had a terrace of three houses built at Magazine Gap. They came to be called Magdalen Terrace. In 1896 he auctioned the contents of No. 3, Magdalen Terrace, 540 lots in all. At the time of his death he also owned a plot, No. 84, which was not built on.

Stonyhurst, the house he built on 23 Coombe Road in 1887, became a Grade I Historic Building assessed by the Antiquities and Monuments Office in 2011.
