= 1894 Hong Kong sanitary board election =

- 16 June 1894
Nominee	J. J. Francis	Robert K. Leigh
Party	Nonpartisan	Nonpartisan
Popular vote	Uncontested	Uncontested
Members before election
J. D. Humphreys
J. J. Francis
Elected Members
J. J. Francis
Robert K. Leigh

The 1894 Hong Kong Sanitary Board election was an election held for the two unofficial seats in the Sanitary Board on 16 June 1894 but, there being only two candidates, the seats were filled uncontested. J. J. Francis was elected for a third term.

During the election, the 1894 Hong Kong plague devastated the colony and drew attention to the composition and power of the board. One proposal, supported by unofficial member of the Legislative Council Ho Kai, called for it to be upgraded to a municipal council with enhanced powers. Others sought its abolition.

== Overview of outcome ==
Sanitary Board Election 1894
Party	Candidate	Votes	%	±%
Nonpartisan	J. J. Francis	Unopposed		
Nonpartisan	Robert Kennaway Leigh	Unopposed		
