= Belilios =

Belilios is a surname. Notable people with the surname include:

- Emanuel Raphael Belilios (1837–1905), Hong Kong banker, opium dealer, philanthropist and businessman
- Raphael Aaron Belilios (1873–1929), Hong Kong medical doctor

== See also ==
- Belilios Public School
