= William Hartigan =

William Hartigan may refer to:

- Bill Hartigan (born 1934), Australian politician
- William Hartigan (British physician) (1852–1936), physician for the Hongkong Shanghai Banking Corporation
- William Hartigan (Irish surgeon) (1756–1812)
