= Ahmet Rumjahn =

Indian Hongkonger broker and estate agent

Ahmet Rumjahn, JP (c.1861 – 30 November 1925) was an Indian Hongkonger broker and estate agent who conveyed business on Hong Kong Island.

Rumjahn was born in Hong Kong and was educated at Queen's College. He got into business when young and became the proprietor of the H. Price & Co., later Gand Price and Co..

Closely involved with community affairs, he was made Justice of the Peace, an honour appreciated by the Indian community in Hong Kong. He became an unofficial member of the Sanitary Board in 1903 election. He retired after serving one term.

He moved to Shanghai in 1912 to commence his business there.

Rumjahn was an Indian Muslim. He was the proprietor of No. 23 Coombe Road from 1903 to 1910. He died on 30 November 1925 at his residence in Shanghai at the age of 64. He had six sons: Sirdar Rumjahn worked for the Omar, A.L., M. Rumjahn in Tientsin, R. Rumjahn in Canton, and N. Rumjahn in Shanghai with his father.

Political offices
Preceded by William Hartigan; James McKie	Member of the Sanitary Board; 1903–1906	Succeeded by Henry Humphreys; Augustus Shelton Hooper
