= 1906 Hong Kong sanitary board election =

- 22 January 1906

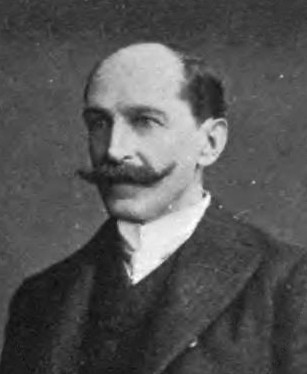
Nominee	Henry Humphreys	A. Shelton Hooper
Party	Nonpartisan	Nonpartisan
Popular vote	Uncontested	Uncontested
Members before election
Henry Edward Pollock
Ahmet Rumjahn
Elected Members
Henry Humphreys
Augustus S. Hooper

The 1906 Hong Kong Sanitary Board election was supposed to be held on 22 January 1906 for the two unofficial seats in the Sanitary Board of Hong Kong.

Only ratepayers who were included in the Special and Common Jury Lists of the years or ratepayers who are exempted from serving on Juries on account of their professional avocations were entitled to vote at the election.

There were only two candidates therefore there was no formal election was held. Henry Humphreys and Augustus Shelton Hooper were elected uncontestedly.

== Overview of outcome ==
Sanitary Board Election 1906
Party	Candidate	Votes	%	±%
Nonpartisan	Henry Humphreys	Unopposed		
Nonpartisan	Augustus Shelton Hooper	Unopposed		
