= Herbert Smith (businessman) =

Herbert Smith was a British businessman in Hong Kong. He was a partner of the Jardine, Matheson & Co. and member of the Legislative Council of Hong Kong.

Smith joined Jardine, Matheson & Co., the then biggest trading firm in the Far East, and became the partner by being authorised to sign in 1876, replacing Edward Whitehall. Smith also became partner of the Butterfield & Swire in 1892. In 1897, he was appointed member of the committee for the Diamond Jubilee of Queen Victoria. He was provisionally appointed to the Legislative Council of Hong Kong during the absence of T. H. Whitehead in 1900.

Legislative Council of Hong Kong
Preceded by T. H. Whitehead	Acting Unofficial Member; Representative for Hong Kong General Chamber of Commerce; 1900	Succeeded by John Thurburn
