= John Thurburn =

British banker

John Thurburn was a British banker. He was manager of the Mercantile Bank of India and member of the Legislative Council of Hong Kong.

Thurburn was the manager of the Chartered Mercantile Bank of India, London & China. He was appointed to the Shipping Charges Commission in 1897, the Subsidiary Coinage Committee in 1899, Committee on Registration of Chinese Partners in 1901, and the Committee on Education and Commission of Inquire into Public Works Department in 1902.

In 1900, he was appointed to the Legislative Council of Hong Kong as a representative of the Hong Kong General Chamber of Commerce vice Herbert Smith resigned. He later replaced R. M. Gray's seat in the Legislative Council in 1901 when Gray resigned.

Thurburn was also founding member of the Hong Kong Jockey Club in 1884 and Hong Kong Golf Club in 1889.

Legislative Council of Hong Kong
Preceded by Herbert Smith	Unofficial Member; Representative for Hong Kong General Chamber of Commerce; 1900–1901	Succeeded by T. H. Whitehead
Preceded by R. M. Gray	Unofficial Member; 1901	Succeeded by C. S. Sharp
