= No. 23 Coombe Road =

Coordinates: 22.2669°N 114.1681°E

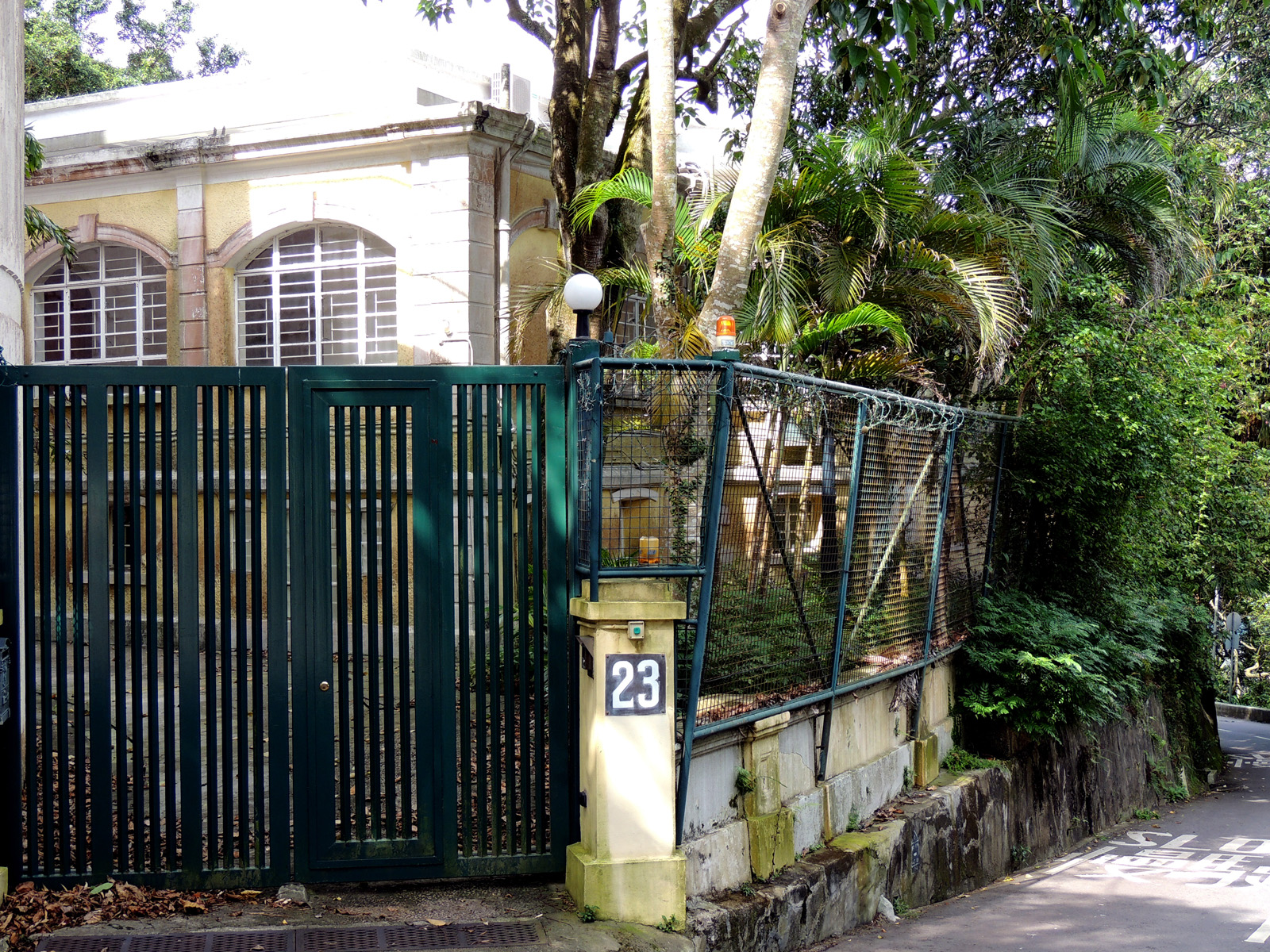
- No. 23 Coombe Road

- Location within Hong Kong
- Location: 23 Coombe Road, The Peak, Hong Kong, China

History
- Built: 1887

Site notes
- Architectural style: Classical European

Hong Kong Graded Building – Grade I

No. 23 Coombe Road is the designation of a historical building on Coombe Road, The Peak, Hong Kong. It was called Stonyhurst when first built in 1887, changed its name to Glen Iris and is now known as Carrick. It is one of the oldest surviving European houses on the Peak. It has been listed as a Grade I Historic Building since 2011.

== History ==
The house was designed as a private luxury house used for residential purpose. Its first owner was J. J. Francis who purchased the plot of land on No. 23 Coombe Road in March 1886. In the following year he built his house and named it 'Stonyhurst', after Stonyhurst College in Lancashire, England, where he had been educated and afterwards intended to enter the Roman Catholic priesthood. It was built in the period when the Peak could boast of hardly more than a few houses. At the time the Peak Tramway was not yet open to the public. The Mid-Levels were then struggling to attract residents, May Road being but a footpath, and Caine Road considered fairly high up.

After Francis's death in 1901, No. 23 Coombe Road changed hands a number of times. Its owners were, in succession, J. J. Francis (1886–1901), The China Fire Insurance Co. Ltd., Ahmet Rumjahn (1903–10), J. J. B. (1910–18), D. V. Falcorner (1918–21), The Hongkong Electric Co. Ltd. (1921–76), Cavendish Property Development Ltd. (1976–93) and then Juli May Ltd. The house was renamed as ‘Glen Iris’ in 1919 until 1972/73 when it was renamed as 'Carrick' – a name that has been adopted since then.

It was briefly used as a filming location for the 2000 film Double Tap (鎗王) as detective Miu's home.

== Styles ==
The two-storey house at No. 23 Coombe Road was remodelled in a classical style by the architectural firm Danby & Leigh, which evolved into Leigh & Orange in 1894.

The house is built on a platform supported by a retaining wall topped by a classical style parapet. The first floor (piano nobile) level is accessed through a portico reached by a flight of external steps flanked by stepped planters, and there is a porch over the landing at the top of the steps. Though modest in scale, the house has a traditional piano nobile at 1/F level and a service floor at G/F level with external ornamental classical features typical of Palladian villas. Palladianism became popular in England from the mid-17th century and in other parts of Europe. Later when the style was falling from favour in Europe, it had a surge in popularity throughout the British colonies.

The elevations of the house are divided into bays by rusticated piers or pilasters. The corners of the building have stucco groins. Moulded stucco bands run around the building. The ground floor windows are smaller than the first floor windows with curved heads and deep reveals. The wide first floor windows have plain segmental arches with central keystones. The walls are finished with painted rough cast rendering. A moulded cornice runs all around the house at eaves level.

== Historical values ==
'Stonyhurst' bears witness to a historical period when the coolies' labour was much needed in the construction of buildings in Hong Kong. In 1889, two years after the completion of 'Stonyhurst', the Governor Sir William Des Vœux described the building of houses on the Peak in these words: “every brick, stone, timber, and other article used in construction, as well as the furniture on completion, requires to be carried on coolies’ shoulders for distances varying from one to two miles to a height of 1,100 to 1,600 feet".

== See also ==
- Revitalising Historic Buildings Through Partnership Scheme
