= The Hongkong Telegraph =

Hong Kong newspaper

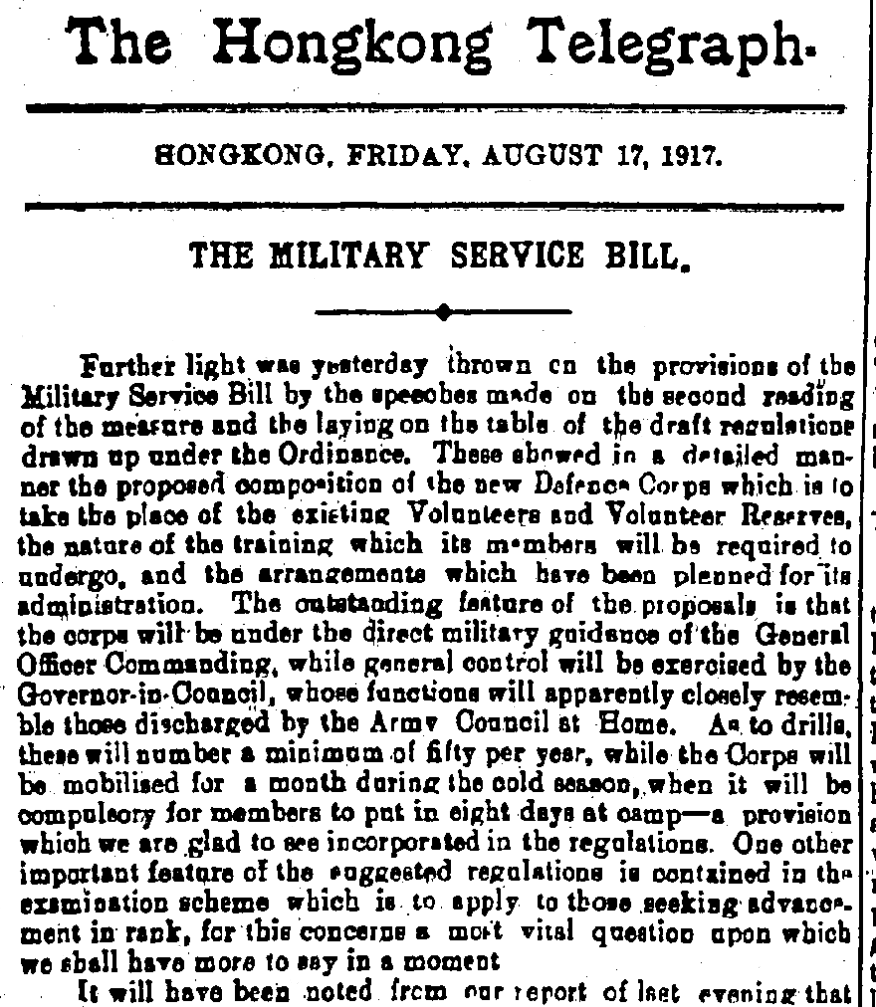
The Hongkong Telegraph reported conscription news on 17 August 1917

The Hongkong Telegraph (Chinese: 士蔑報; Jyutping: si6 mit6 bou3) was a Hong Kong newspaper founded in 1881.

== History ==
It was first published as an afternoon daily on 15 June 1881 from offices on Wellington Street. It was founded by Robert Fraser-Smith, who was also the paper's editor. Fraser-Smith, a former book-keeper with the Hong Kong and Whampoa Dock Company, was known for his "fearlessness in expression of his views in print". The Chinese name of The Hongkong Telegraph is based on Fraser-Smith's name.

As editor of the paper, Fraser-Smith was charged numerous times with libel. For instance, in July 1882, he was convicted by Chief Justice George Phillippo for libel against actor Daniel E. Bandmann, and sentenced to two months imprisonment. Fraser-Smith died in 1895, and the paper was acquired by J. J. Francis. Chesney Duncan (15 September 1854 – 24 September 1935) became editor of the paper, and held this position for several years, leaving to report on the Boxer Rebellion for the Daily Mail. He later worked for the Straits Echo, the Pinang Gazette, and the Times of Malaya. Subsequently, Ethelbert Forbes Skertchley became editor.

In 1916, The Hongkong Telegraph was brought under the control of the South China Morning Post, Ltd., which also published the South China Morning Post, another English-language Hong Kong newspaper, founded in 1903.
