= Roderick Mackenzie Gray =

British businessman

Roderick Mackenzie Gray was a British businessman and member of the Legislative Council of Hong Kong.

He was the head of the Reiss & Co. and the Chairman of the Hongkong and Shanghai Bank. He was made Justice of the Peace in 1890. From 1897 to 1900, he was Chairman of the Hong Kong General Chamber of Commerce from 1897 to 1900. On 21 June 1900 he was appointed unofficial member of the Legislative Council of Hong Kong vice E. R. Belilios resigned.

He married Eleanor Maud H. Potts in Hong Kong on 8 May 1893. He was a steward of the Hong Kong Jockey Club.

Business positions
Preceded by J. J. Bell-Irving	Chairman of the Hongkong and Shanghai Banking Corporation; 1899–1900	Succeeded by N. A. Siebs
Legislative Council of Hong Kong
Preceded by E. R. Belilios	Unofficial Member; 1900–1901	Succeeded by John Thurburn
