= 1899 Hong Kong sanitary board election =

- 18 December 1899
Nominee	William Hartigan	James McKie
Party	Nonpartisan	Nonpartisan
Popular vote	Uncontested	Uncontested
Elected Members
William Hartigan
James McKie

The 1899 Hong Kong Sanitary Board election was supposed to be held on 18 December 1899 for the two unofficial seats in the Sanitary Board of British Hong Kong. Only persons on the jury lists of the year were eligible to vote. There were only two candidates therefore only 19 votes were cast as a formality.

Prior to the election, the issue of reconstitution of the Sanitary Board was intensively debated. A plebiscite of the British community based on the jury lists was held in June 1896, as to whether Sanitary Board should contain an official or unofficial majority. The Government refused to make any further constitutional changes however the election for unofficial members was not held until 1899.

Dr William Hartigan and James McKie were elected. They both resigned in April 1901 to protest that the Board was given too few powers.
