= Watsons =

Personal and health care chain store

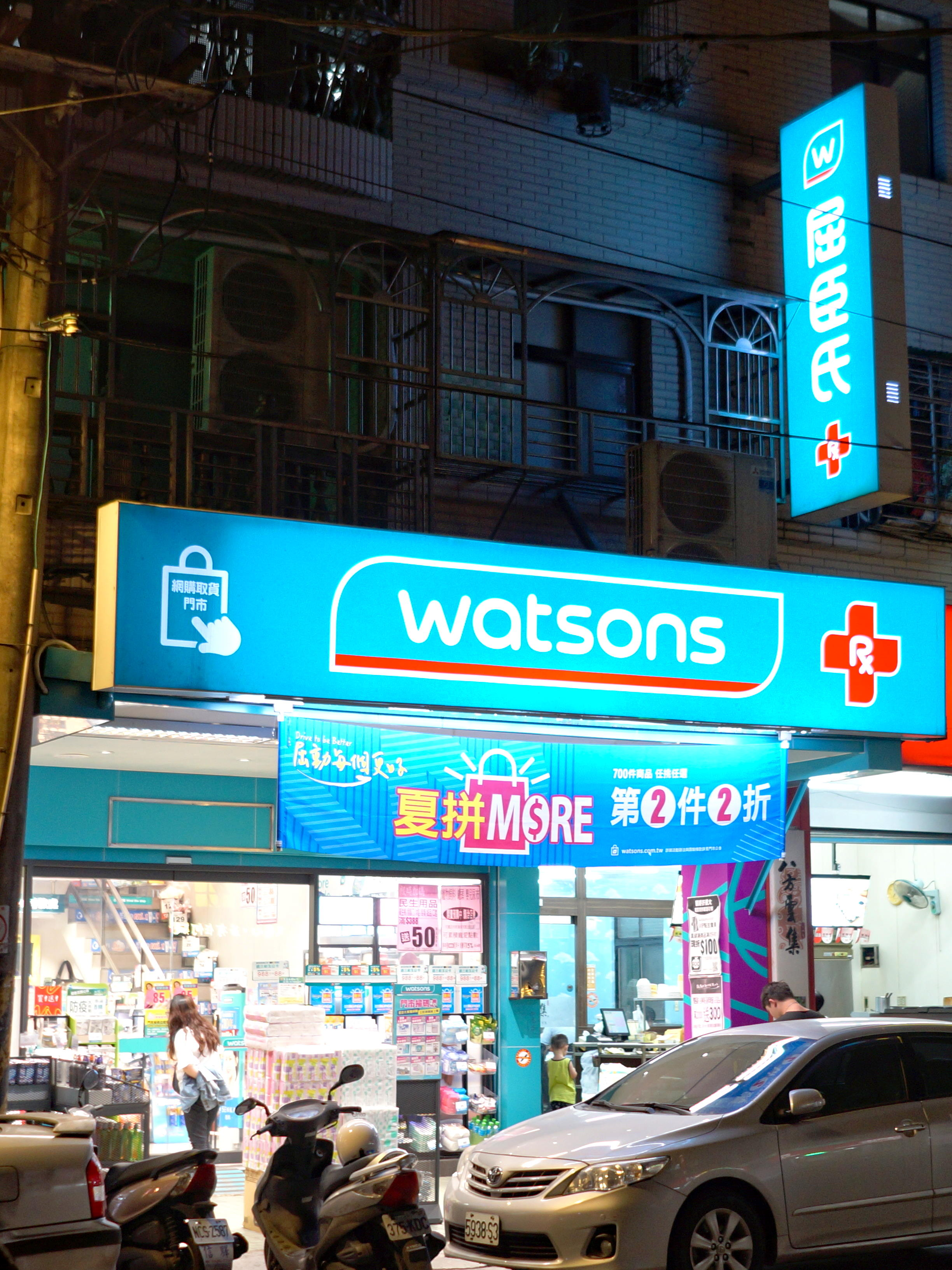
- A Watsons store in Keelung, Taiwan
- Company type: Subsidiary
- Industry: Pharmacy; Health care Beauty care
- Founded: 1828; 198 years ago
- Headquarters: Hong Kong
- Area served: Mainland China; Hong Kong; Indonesia; Japan; Macau; Malaysia; Philippines; Singapore; Taiwan; Thailand; Turkey; Ukraine; United Arab Emirates; Vietnam; Saudi Arabia; Qatar
- Key people: Dominic Lai; Malina Ngai
- Parent: AS Watson
- Website: www.watsonsasia.com

Watsons

Chinese name
- Chinese: 屈臣氏
Transcriptions
Standard Mandarin
- Hanyu Pinyin: Qūchénshì

Japanese name
- Kana: ワトソンズ
Transcriptions
- Romanization: Watosonzu

Korean name
- Hangul: 왓슨스
Transcriptions
- Revised Romanization: Watseunseu
- McCune–Reischauer: Wassŭnsŭ

Watsons (Chinese: 屈臣氏; Jyutping: Wat^{1}san^{4}si^{6}) is a Hong Kong health care and beauty care chain store in Asia and Europe. It is the flagship health and beauty brand of AS Watson, which is majority owned by CK Hutchison Holdings.

It operates 8,000 stores and 1,500 pharmacies in 15 Asian and European markets, including Japan, Hong Kong, Indonesia, Macau, mainland China, Malaysia, the Philippines, Singapore, Taiwan, Thailand, Vietnam, Turkey, Ukraine, United Arab Emirates, Saudi Arabia and Qatar. Its South Korean branch closed down in 2021.

== History ==
=== Founding and move to Hong Kong ===
Thomas Boswell Watson (1815–1860), from Scotland, was the first member of the Watson family to arrive in the Far East, where in 1845 he set up a private practice in Macau. After selling his practice to a fellow doctor, he moved to Hong Kong in 1856 where he became part owner of the Hong Kong Dispensary, an offshoot of the Canton Dispensary which operated from 1828 to 1858.

Known as the "Big Medicine Shop" (Chinese: 大藥房; Cantonese: Dai Yeuk Fong), the dispensary's main customers were soldiers and sailors. The dispensary was not known as A.S. Watson until 1870, although Alexander Skirving Watson took over in 1858 following management changes. T. B. Watson sent his family back to Scotland in 1857, and he followed two years later.

Following the death of T. B. Watson in 1860, the Hong Kong Dispensary was leased to A. S. Watson and two other doctors, and onwards from 1862, the name A.S. Watson featured prominently at the Hong Kong Dispensary. In 1871, the Watson family leased the company to John David Humphreys and Arthur Hunt, and thereafter trading was under the name A.S. Watson & Company.

The company entered China and the Philippines in 1883, but withdrew from both countries in 1910.

Retail outlets were known as "Watsons the Chemist". The current owners, Hutchison Group, acquired a controlling interest in A.S. Watson & Co., Ltd in 1963. In 1981, it became a wholly owned subsidiary of Hutchison Whampoa Ltd. At this time, the group had 75 retail outlets.

=== International expansion ===
In the late 1980s, the chain expanded to other parts of Asia. The first modern Watsons store outside Hong Kong opened in the Portuguese territory of Macau in late May 1987. The first Watsons in Taiwan opened in September 1987, and by May 1991 the number of Taiwanese locations numbered 25. The first Watsons store in Singapore opened on 29 April 1988, with the chain expanding to operate 27 outlets across the city-state by 1993.

The first Watsons store in China opened in April 1989. Located in Beijing's newly opened Palace Hotel, the shop's products were all shipped from Hong Kong, and were therefore for sale in foreign exchange certificates only. Watson's management thus expected the shop's customers to mainly comprise foreign tourists. The Palace Hotel was partly owned by the People's Liberation Army, which required all shop staff to complete a month-long boot camp.

Watsons personal care stores were subsequently opened in Malaysia (1994), Thailand (1996), and a revival in the Philippines (2002) after 92 years. The first Watsons store in Indonesia opened on 13 January 2006 in Jakarta.

The first Watsons store in Japan opened in Tokyo on 14 November 2008.

In 2019, Watsons reached 7,800 stores and expanded to Vietnam, its 13th operating market.

In 2020, Al-Futtaim and AS Watson have signed a franchise agreement to open stores of healthcare and beauty chain Watsons in the Gulf region. Watsons opened its first flagship store at The Dubai Mall in October 2020.

In 2024, Watsons opened its 8,000th store at SM Mall of Asia in the Philippines.

On 7 January 2025, Watsons reopened its Singapore flagship store at Ngee Ann City after a revamp.

== Operations ==
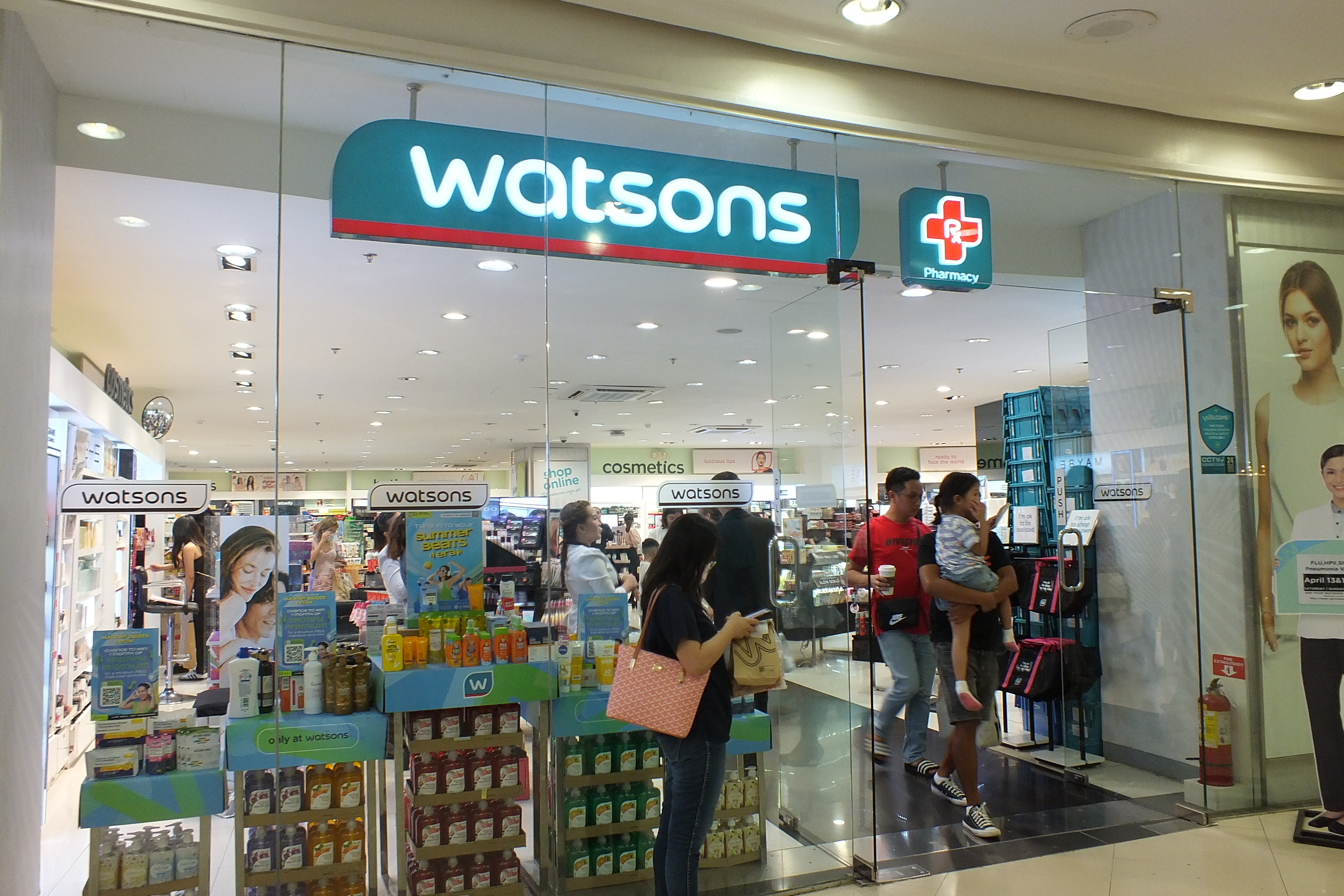
A Watsons store at Ayala Center Cebu, Cebu City, Philippines

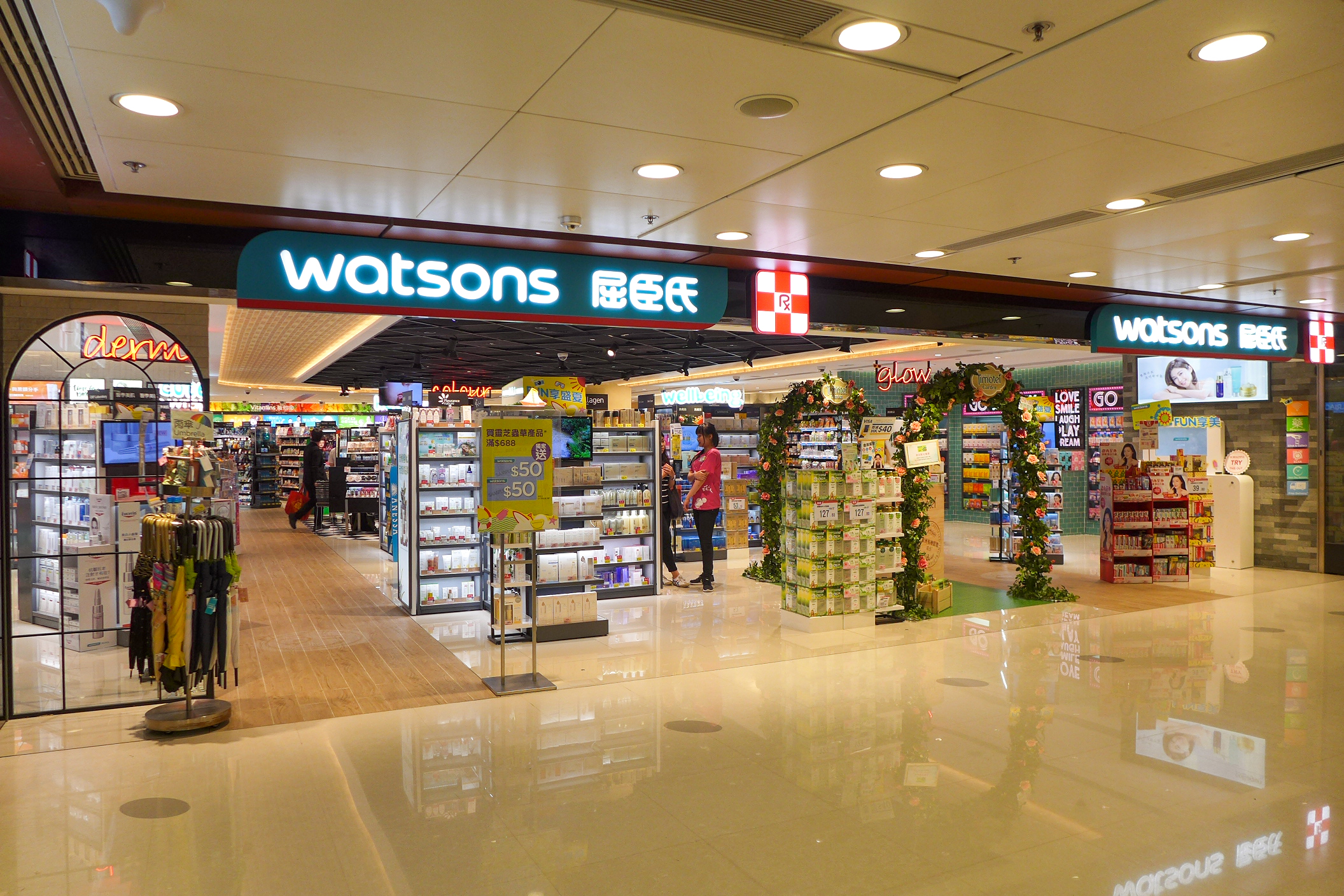
A Watsons store in Hong Kong

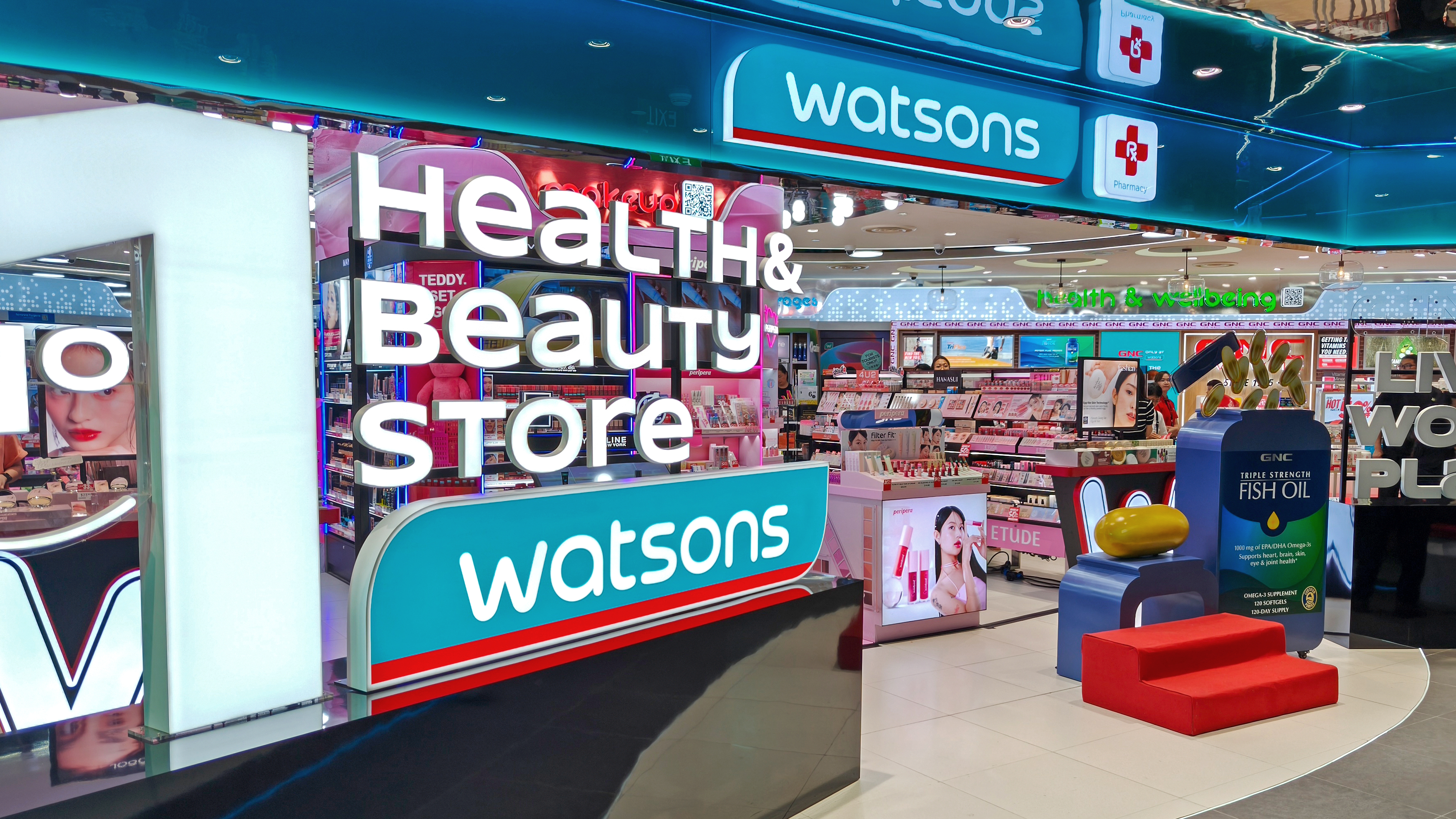
Watsons Singapore Flagship Store at Ngee Ann City.

As of 2021, there are around 8,000 stores and more than 1,500 pharmacies in 14 Asian and European markets, including mainland China, Hong Kong, Taiwan, Macau, Japan, Singapore, Thailand, Malaysia, the Philippines, Indonesia, Vietnam, Turkey, Ukraine, United Arab Emirates (UAE), Saudi Arabia and Qatar.

A.S. Watson Retail, as well as the Watson chain of stores in Hong Kong, is headquartered in Watson House, Fo Tan, Hong Kong. An 11-storey distribution centre opened in April 1983.
