= Port Jew =

The Port Jew concept was formulated by Lois Dubin and David Sorkin in the late 1990s as a social type that describes Jews who were involved in the seafaring and maritime economy of Europe, especially in the seventeenth and eighteenth centuries. Helen Fry suggests that they could be considered to have been "the earliest modern Jews."

The concept of the "Port Jew" has been suggested as an "alternate path to modernity" that was distinct from the European Haskalah. Port Jews are described as the product of what is characterized as the "liberal environment" of port towns and cities.

David Sorkin restricts his definition of the "port Jew" to apply only to a very specific group of Sephardi and Italian-Jewish merchants who were participants in the Mediterranean and transatlantic economy of the seventeenth and eighteenth centuries.

== Origins ==
According to Helen Fry, Port Jews often arrived as "refugees from the Inquisition" and the expulsion of Jews from Iberia. They were allowed to settle in port cities as merchants granted permission to trade in ports such as Amsterdam, London, Trieste and Hamburg. Fry notes that their connections with the Jewish diaspora and their expertise in maritime trade made them of particular interest to the mercantilist governments of Europe. Lois Dubin describes Port Jews as Jewish merchants who were "valued for their engagement in the international maritime trade upon which such cities thrived". Sorkin and others have characterized the socio-cultural profile of these men as marked by a flexibility towards religion and a "reluctant cosmopolitanism that was alien to both traditional and "enlightened" Jewish identities."

== Port Jewish families and business in the early modern period ==
Jewish family tradition and strategy was built upon business and safety. Jewish families, as in the case with the Jewish merchant Glikl, married off her children both in nearby cities as well as distant cities for the reason of business and safety. Glikl being a business woman was not uncommon amongst the German Jews. Christian, Italy, and France all differed from Jewish life history in that it was based on ethical will, which included more of a tale of life lessons to be passed on to the children as well as direction on how to proceed after their death. Glikl in writing her memoir focused on analyzing accounts of her life while simultaneously addressing her children. Not only was “Memoirs of Gluckel of Hameln” a rich source for cultural and social history, but it also had unusual literacy structure and religious resonance. In Jewish family culture koved was directly in tune with honesty in business which is also connected to your status, oysher un koved. Glikl prided herself on leaving Hamburg without a bad debt with any Jew or non-Jew. Jewish business failure held huge weight in bringing shame and disgrace to the Jewish name.

=== Port Jewish widows in the early modern period ===
During the early modern period, wives of Port Jew merchants participated in business through their approach of marriage as a business partnership. Cheryl Tallan explains how earlier recordings of Jewish women partaking in their husbands’ business dealings can be witnessed in the case recorded by Rabbi Samson in 1216. During the seventeenth and eighteenth century, women such as Glickl of Hameln, as read in the “Memoirs of Gluckel of Hameln”, (including both her mother and grandmother) participated in their husbands’ business dealings as Port Jews in Hamburg. As was common with many Jewish couples during this period, women had the opportunity to continue their family business after their husbands were deceased. As a widow, they received a dowry from their husband's estate or descendants upon their husbands’ death. Through the dowries, Jewish widows were able to continue their husbands’ business dealings and their children’s marriage proposals through the utilization of the business networks established prior to their husbands’ death.

== Expanded to include Ashkenazi merchants ==
Dubin has proposed that the concept of the "port Jew" be expanded to describe "port Jewry" which she describes as a particular type of Jewish community that existed in European maritime ports and combined maritime commerce with European and Jewish culture. This expanded definition would encompass Ashkenazi as well as Sephardi merchants living in other European ports such as Hamburg, Southampton, Portsmouth, and Odessa.

== See also ==
- Emanuel Raphael Belilios
- Jewish pirates
- Radhanite
- Middleman minority

== Sources ==
- Sorkin, David (Spring 1999). "The Port Jew: Notes Toward a Social Type". Journal of Jewish Studies. 50 (1). Cambridge, England: 87–97. doi:10.18647/2168/JJS-1999.
- Dubin, Lois. The Port Jews of Habsburg Trieste: Absolutist Politics and Enlightenment Culture. Stanford: Stanford University Press, 1999
- Cesarani, David ed. Port Jews: Jewish Communities in Cosmopolitan Maritime Trading Centres, 1550–1950. London: Frank Cass, 2002
- Cesarani, David and Romain, Gemma eds. Jews and Port Cities, 1590–1990: Commerce, Community and Cosmopolitanism. London: Vallentine Mitchell, 2006
- Monaco, C. S. “Port Jews or a People of the Diaspora? A Critique of the Port Jew Concept,” In Jewish Social Studies Vol. 15, no. 2 (Winter 2009), pp. 137–66
