= Emanuel Raphael Belilios =

Hong Kong politician

Emanuel Raphael Belilios CMG, JP
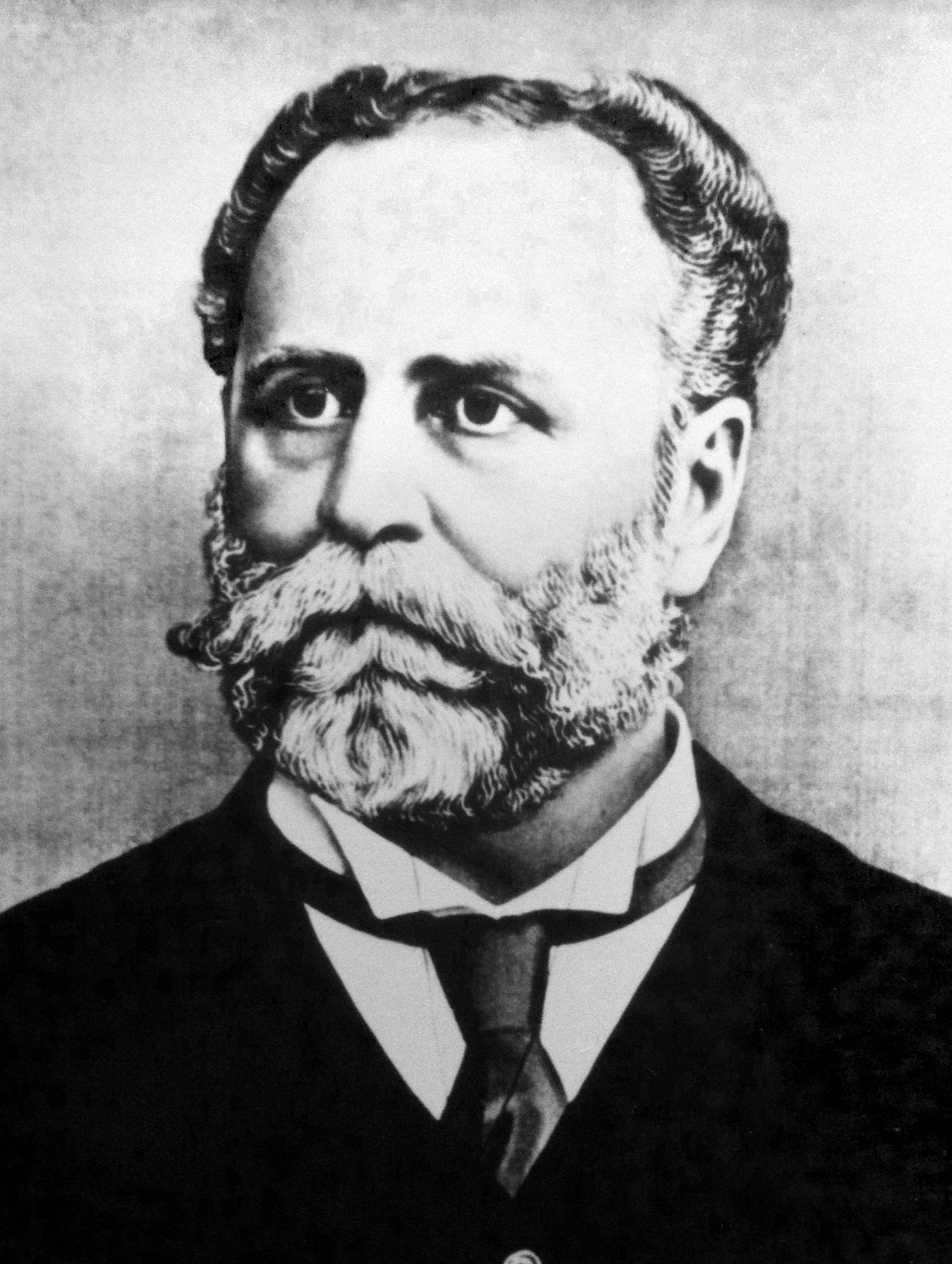

Unofficial Member of the Legislative Council of Hong Kong
- In office 8 August 1881 – 5 September 1882
- Appointed by: Sir John Pope Hennessy
- Preceded by: John MacNeile Price
- Succeeded by: John MacNeile Price
- In office 25 February 1892 – 5 April 1900
- Appointed by: Sir William Robinson; Sir Wilsone Black
- Preceded by: Phineas Ryrie
- Succeeded by: R. M. Gray

Chairman of the Hongkong & Shanghai Banking Corporation
- In office 1876–1877
- Preceded by: Andolph von André
- Succeeded by: Hans Christian Heinrich Hoppius

Personal details
- Born: 14 November 1837 Calcutta, British India
- Died: 11 November 1905 (aged 67) London, United Kingdom
- Resting place: Golders Green Jewish Cemetery

Emanuel Raphael Belilios, CMG, JP (14 November 1837 – 11 November 1905) was a banker, opium dealer, philanthropist and businessman, born in Calcutta, British India and active in Hong Kong. His father, Raphael Emanuel Belilios, was a member of a Jewish Venetian family of Sephardic origin. Belilios married Simha Ezra in 1855, and in 1862 he settled in Hong Kong and engaged in trade. His success saw him described in the British press at the time as "one of the merchant princes of the colony."

In the 1870s, Belilios was chairman of the Hongkong and Shanghai Hotels, Limited.

He tried to establish relations with the then British prime minister Benjamin Disraeli by proposing a marble and bronze statue of Disraeli, which was rejected by the prime minister. Belilios erected the Beaconsfield Arcade, a reference to Disraeli title Lord Beaconsfield, in Hong Kong instead. However until his death Bellios would annually send a wreath to decorate the statue of Benjamin Disraeli on Parliament Square.

He became Hongkong and Shanghai Banking Corporation Chairman from 1876 to 1877, appointed to the Legislative Council of Hong Kong in 1881 and as the Council's Senior Unofficial Member from 1892 to 1900.

Belilios gained his reputation as a philanthropist. In the years 1887 and 1888, Belilios gave two annual scholarships valued at $60, to the students of the Hong Kong College of Medicine for Chinese and studying at the Alice Memorial Hospital. Later in 1888, Belilios was a Director of the Hong Kong, Canton & Macao Steamboat Company In August 1889, Belilios donated $25,000 to set up a girls' government school. The Belilios Public School was renamed from Central School for Girls in honour of Belilios.

His first son David Belilios died in the plague of 1898.

Regarding the Chinese population Belilios observed favourably that: “The native Chinese make no difference between a Jew and Christian. Both are foreigners in their eyes, but, if anything they are better affected towards the Jew who they regard as Asiatic like themselves.”

Belilios died in London on 11 November 1905 and was buried at Golders Green Jewish Cemetery. On his death he bequeathed a £250,000 to found a free college for Jewish children in Calcutta.

== Family history ==
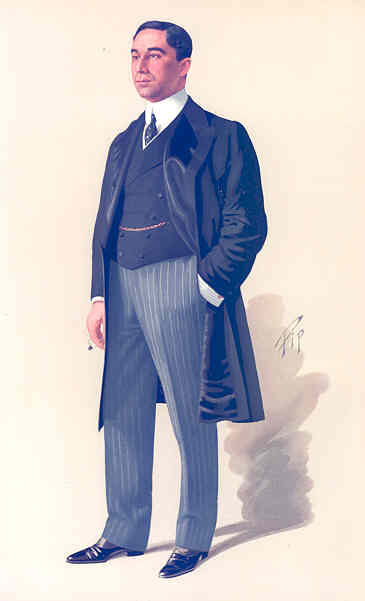
Raphael Emanuel Belilios Vanity Fair 6 January 1910

The Belilios family originated in the Iberian Peninsula. Research in Jewish communal archives have traced the family to Portugal where they live for several generations as New Christians. The Belilios family was forcibly converted in 1497 to Christianity along with the entire Jewish community of Portugal. In all likelihood the Belilios family remained ethnically apart and practiced crypto-Judaism as marranos until a wave of persecution targeted the elite Portuguese New Christian merchant families in the early seventeenth century.

Raphael Belilios, who was known in Portugal as Filipo Terço, fled the inquisition to Venice. Like other families from the generation of refugees the Belilios family strained to pass on objects with a symbolic connection to their former homeland. In 1653 Raphael Belilios was recorded in Venice as leaving to his two daughters the silverware he brought from Lisbon to Venice.

The Belilios having settled in Venice in the early seventieth century regained their previous commercial success and within a century the family firm operated in Venice, Livorno and Aleppo. Jewish merchants engaged in Mediterranean trade at the time was conducted business through tight familial alliances with the Sephardic community. As a result, during the 18th century the Belilios family were the business partners of the Ergas, Baruch Carvaglio and Silvera families of Livorno. The Belilios and Carvaglio families intermarried for at least three generations establishing two prosperous merchants dynasties.

Family documents such as wills speak of the Belilios family belonging to "the Jewish nation, of Spanish and Portuguese descent" and "established in Livorno, Venice, London, Amsterdam and Aleppo." This mapped the business interests and offices of the Belilios family partnerships which leveraged intense ethnic networking and marriage ties into lasting trading relationships. Trading documents show the Belilios family in the seventeenth and eighteenth century also intensely trading with Catholic and even Hindu merchants in Goa.

Historians have identified the Belilios family as culturally a type known as Port Jews a concept formulated by Lois Dubin and David Sorkin as a social type that engaged in seafaring and maritime economy of Europe in the seventeenth and eighteenth century. Port Jews according to Lois Dubin were marked by a flexibility towards religion, an engagement with European culture and "a reluctant cosmopolitanism that was alien to both traditional and 'enlightened' Jewish identities." Families such as the Belilios have been described as "the earliest modern Jews" and offering an "alternative path" to Jewish modernity from the Court Jews and the Ashkenazi centred Haskalah.

The Belilios family, like many other Sephardic Jews operating out of Livorno, positioned themselves as central merchants and brokers in the booming trade of coral and diamonds coming from the Indian Ocean. Not travelling to India themselves they ran a family partnership in Aleppo and from there relied on a chain of mostly Mizrahi Jewish brokers and caravan traders through Syria, Iraq and Persia to connect them to their distant Hindu trading partners in the far off Portuguese colony.

The Belilios were not only traders but also rabbis. Rabbi Jacob Belilios served the community of Venice in the early eighteenth century. Rabbi Jacob Belilios was one of the main Rabbinical voices in Italy who sought to suppress the mystical visionary and kabbalist Moshe Chaim Luzzato, for fear he was of a renewed outbreak of messianism less than a century since the crisis wrought by the heretical claims of Shabbatai Zvi.

The 1730s the Venetian Jewish community were afflicted by a profound financial crisis and records show in 1737–1738 was sent on a mission with a fellow member of the community to seek assistance from the flourishing Spanish and Portuguese Jews congregations in London and Amsterdam.

This downturn in Venetian affairs may have encouraged members of the family to settle permanently on Aleppo. The branch of the Belilios family which established itself and a branch of the family firm in Aleppo was one a clutch of Sephardic families known as the Livornese Jews under the protection of the French crown. Thus, in 1744 when Isaac Belilios is recorded as having killed a Muslim caravan conductor he was tried by the French consul.

These privileges caused friction within the Jewish community of long established and Ladino speaking Sephardic Jewish families and Arabic speaking Syrian Jews. The Livornese Jews of Aleppo were known as the Segnores Francos (Frank Lords) by these poorer Eastern Sephardim who were Jews long established in the Ottoman Empire. These families spoke Spanish, Portuguese, French and Italian rather than Ladino and their Arabic was basic at best.

There was also a cultural divide with the older Sephardic community. The Livornese families such as the Belilios were known in Aleppo to follow European customs when it came to dress. This included wearing whigs, hats and contravening Rabbinic ordinance went clean shaven. Like the other Western Sephardim the Belilios kept themselves apart, at least initially, from the poorer Eastern Sephardim or the Arabic speaking Jews of Baghdad and Persia they traded with. However, during the eighteenth century the Aleppo branch of the Belilios family was brought into ever closer trading relationships with Baghdadi Jews and Persian Jews.

During the 18th century the Belilios family are recorded as owning ships that travelled between Syria and Venice. However their fortunes sagged. The decline of Aleppo which was followed by the decline of Venice itself in the early 19th century saw a brand of the Belilios family establish in Basra to take advantage of the booming ocean trade with British India and then, now intermarried with the leading families of the older Ladino speaking elite of Aleppo such as the Lanyado family, move onwards to Calcutta and Singapore.

By the early nineteenth century the Belilios no longer operated as a united family and those established in the Far East were more modest merchants. This brought the Belilios family from being dominant players in the Western Sephardic world to outsiders in the flourishing Baghdadi Jewish diaspora, with who they intermarried including with the Gubbay and Judah families that were prominent in Calcutta. By the early nineteenth century the Belilios family established in the Far East has assimilated to Baghdadi Jewish culture and were primarily Arabic and English speaking.

Isaac Raphael Belilios, his brother, who was also born in Calcutta established himself in Singapore, with whom the Baghdadi Jews of Calcutta were in constant contact, and went on to dominate the cattle market. Belilios Lane, Belilios Terrace and Belilios Road in Singapore are named after him.

The success of Belilios in Hong Kong catapulted the family to wealth and then to Great Britain. His son, Raphael Emanuel Belilios, was a barrister in England. He was admitted to the Middle Temple in 1900 and called to the Bar in 1903.

In the same year, Raphael had an arranged marriage to Vera Charlotte Hart, the only daughter of Sir Israel Hart of Holland Park and Lady Charlotte Victoria of Knighton, Leicester Raphael was admitted to the Bar on 16 May 1903. He occupied chambers at Middle Temple from 1904 to 1922. The death of Raphael Emmanuel Bellios meant unlike other Baghdadi Jewish families such as the Sassoons the fortune of Emanuel Raphael Belilios did not establish a dynasty.

Plaques on the wall of the Spanish Synagogue in Venice record that many of the last members of the Belilios family established in Venice perished in the Holocaust.

== See also ==
- Raphael Aaron Belilios
- Beaconsfield House
- First houses on the Peak

Legislative Council of Hong Kong
| Preceded by John MacNeile Price | Unofficial Member; 1881–1882 | Succeeded by John MacNeile Price |
| Preceded by Phineas Ryrie | Unofficial Member; 1892–1900 | Succeeded by Roderick Mackenzie Gray |
| Preceded by Phineas Ryrie | Senior Unofficial Member; 1892–1900 | Succeeded by Paul Chater |
Business positions
| Preceded by Andolph von André | Chairman of the Hongkong and Shanghai Banking Corporation; 1876–1877 | Succeeded by Hans Christian Heinrich Hoppius |
