= Thomas Child Hayllar =

Barrister in Hong Kong

Thomas Child Hayllar (1835–1918) was a British barrister and member of the Executive and Legislative Councils of Hong Kong.

== Life ==
Born in 1835 in Rumboldswyke near Chichester, East Sussex, England, Hayllar was son of Thomas Hayllar and Mary Ann Child. He matriculated at St John's College, Cambridge in 1855, and entered the Inner Temple in 1858.

Hayllar became a barrister-at-law and joined the government in Hong Kong. He was appointed Queen's Counsel in 1874. Hayllar had acted as Judge of the Court of Summary Jurisdiction in 1872 and 1873, Attorney General in 1874, Solicitor General in 1878 and Puisne Judge of the Supreme Court in 1879. In 1878, he was appointed as an unofficial member of the Legislative Council during Surveyor General J. M. Price was acting Colonial Secretary.

Hayllar was one of the few friends and supporters of the 8th Governor John Pope Hennessy. The friendship ended when Hayllar was caught by Hennessy reading a museum guide with pictures of naked female statues with the Governor's wife, Catherine, in her boudoir at the Mountain Lodge, the Governor's summer residence in April 1879. Few days later when Hayllar ran into Hennessy he was attacked by the Governor with an umbrella who could not control his anger.

Hayllar left Hong Kong on 23 January 1882.

Legislative Council of Hong Kong
Preceded by J. M. Price	Unofficial Member; 1878	Succeeded by J. M. Price
