= J. J. Bell-Irving =

Scottish businessman

- Born: James Jardine Bell-Irving; 24 December 1859; Roxburghshire, Scotland
- Died: 8 June 1936 (aged 76); London, England
- Occupation: businessman
- Spouse: Eva Gertrude-Piercy (1890－1936)
- Children: 2
- Parent(s): John Bell-Irving; Mary Jardine
- Relatives: John Bell-Irving (brother)

James Jardine Bell-Irving (24 December 1859 – 8 June 1936) was a Scottish businessman in Hong Kong and China and member of the Executive Council and Legislative Council of Hong Kong.

Son of John Bell-Irving and Mary Jardine, niece of Dr. William Jardine and sister of Sir Robert Jardine, James Jardine was born at St Mungo, Kirkbank, Dumfries And Galloway, Scotland on 24 December 1859 in the family of the Jardine Matheson & Co., one of the largest trading firms in the Far East. He arrived in China in 1881 and became a partner at the company in 1887. He became a director of company for from 1887 to 1902 and also numerous public companies, including the chairman of the Hongkong and Shanghai Banking Corporation.

He was appointed as unofficial member of the Legislative Council of Hong Kong in 1892, 1893, 1896 and 1901 and became the first of the two unofficial members in the Executive Council of Hong Kong in 1896 and again in 1901, until he retired from public and business services and returned to England in 1902.

After going back to England, he lived at Minto House, Hawick and Rokeby, Barnard Castle, and bought the Makerstoun property on the River Tweed near Kelso afterward. He died in London on 8 June 1936.

He married Eva Gertrude Piercy, daughter of Benjamin Piercy in Hong Kong in 1890 and had two daughters:

1. Ethel Mary (born 4 October 1891) married Ian Maitland, 15th Earl of Lauderdale
2. Eva Margaretta (born 20 July 1893)

== See also ==
- List of Executive Council of Hong Kong unofficial members 1896–1941

Legislative Council of Hong Kong
Preceded by James Johnstone Keswick	Unofficial Member; 1892–1893	Succeeded by James Johnstone Keswick
Preceded by James Johnstone Keswick	Unofficial Member; 1895	Succeeded by James Johnstone Keswick
Preceded by James Johnstone Keswick	Unofficial Member; 1896–1899	Succeeded by James Johnstone Keswick
Preceded by James Johnstone Keswick	Unofficial Member; 1901–1902	Succeeded by Charles Wedderburn Dickson
Political offices
New office	Unofficial Member of the Executive Council of Hong Kong; 1896–1899	Succeeded by James Johnstone Keswick
Preceded by James Johnstone Keswick	Unofficial Member of the Executive Council of Hong Kong; 1901–1902	Succeeded by Charles Wedderburn Dickson
Business positions
Preceded by Stephen C. Michaelsen	Chairman of the Hongkong and Shanghai Banking Corporation; 1898–1899	Succeeded by Roderick Mackenzie Gray
