= 1891 Hong Kong sanitary board election =

- 17 June 1891
- Registered: 445 ▼33.48%
- Turnout: 256 (57.53%) ▲29.58pp

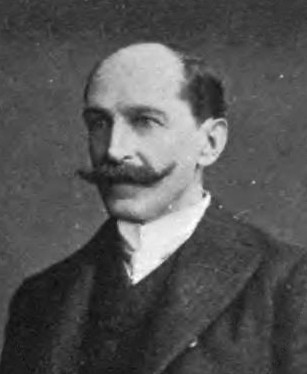
Nominee	J. D. Humphreys	J. J. Francis	A. Shelton Hooper
Party	Nonpartisan	Nonpartisan	Nonpartisan
Popular vote	217	198	77
Percentage	44.11%	40.24%	15.65%
Members before election
J. D. Humphreys
J. J. Francis
Elected Members
J. D. Humphreys
J. J. Francis

The 1891 Hong Kong Sanitary Board election held on 17 June 1891 was the second election for the two unofficial seats in the Sanitary Board of Hong Kong.

Only ratepayers on the jury lists of the year were eligible to vote.

There were 256 out of the 445 persons of the electorate voted. Each elector could cast up to two votes.

== Overview of outcome ==
Sanitary Board Election 1891
Party	Candidate	Votes	%	±%
Nonpartisan	John David Humphreys	217	44.11	+6.14
Nonpartisan	J. J. Francis	198	40.24	+10.83
Nonpartisan	Augustus Shelton Hooper	77	15.65	
Turnout		225	57.53	+29.58
Registered electors		446		−33.48
