= David Sorkin =

American historian

Academic background
- Education: University of Wisconsin–Madison; University of California, Berkeley

Academic work
- Discipline: Jewish History
- Institutions: Yale University
- Notable ideas: Port Jew, Subculture, Religious Enlightenment, Emancipation
- Website: history.yale.edu/people/david-sorkin

David Sorkin is the Lucy G. Moses professor of Jewish history at Yale University. Sorkin specializes in the intersection of Jewish and European history, and has published several prominent books including Jewish Emancipation: A History Across Five Centuries.

== Career ==
Sorkin graduated from the University of Wisconsin–Madison in 1975 (Phi Beta Kappa). In 1977 he received a Masters degree in Comparative Literature, and in 1983 a PhD in History from the University of California, Berkeley.

He has taught at Brown (1983–1986), Oxford (1986–1992), the University of Wisconsin-Madison (1992–2011), and the CUNY Graduate Center (2011–2014).

Sorkin has published several prominent works on Jewish history. His first book, The Transformation of German Jewry, 1780–1840 published in 1987, argued that emancipation did not lead to "assimilation" but rather to the formation of a "subculture" that combined German culture, and especially the ideal of Bildung, with Judaism In 1996 he wrote Moses Mendelssohn and the Religious Enlightenment, a concise study of Mendelssohn's Jewish thought in which, on the basis of the neglected Hebrew writings, he argued that Mendelssohn used radical ideas for conservative ends. The book has been translated into French, German, and Italian.

In 2000 he wrote The Berlin Haskalah and German Religious Thought: Orphans of Knowledge. The book, first delivered in 1997 as the Sherman Lectures in the Department of Religions and Theology at Manchester University (UK), argued that the Haskalah should be understood within the context of wider Central European religious and intellectual changes rather than as a parochial Jewish phenomenon. In The Religious Enlightenment: Protestants, Jews, and Catholics from London to Vienna (Jews, Christians, and Muslims from the Ancient to the Modern World) published in 2008, Sorkin reconceived the relationship of the Enlightenment to religion, arguing that religious thinkers of all confessions used Enlightenment philosophy and science to rearticulate belief. "Jewish Emancipation: A History Across Five Centuries" (2019), is the first comprehensive study of the subject. It demonstrates that emancipation was and remains the principal event of modern Jewish history. It has been translated into Romanian and Chinese. [Title = "The Emancipationists: Nineteenth-Century Jews' Campaign for Citizenship"] (2026), rehabilitates the politics of emancipation.

Sorkin has co-edited three volumes: Profiles in Diversity: Jews in a Changing Europe, 1750–1870 (1998), New Perspectives on the Haskalah (2001), and What History Tells: George L. Mosse and the Culture of Modern Europe (2004). He served as associate editor of The Oxford Handbook of Jewish Studies (2002), which won the National Jewish Book Award. With Edward Breuer as co-editor and translator he published, Moses Mendelssohn's Hebrew Writings (Yale Judaic Studies, Yale University Press, 2018).

== Reception ==
Sorkin's books have had a notable impact. The American Historical Review described Sorkin's The Religious Enlightenment: Protestants, Jews, and Catholics from London to Vienna as a work that makes "very interesting discoveries about the parallel developments within different religions in the eighteenth century." Similarly, The New York Times described it as a "persuasive work" about how "Europe's major religions produced movements of religious reform compatible with the enlightenment." Central European History reviewed it as a book of "very great importance, for early modernists and modern historians alike."

Sorkin has received fellowships from the National Endowment for the Humanities (1994–5) and the John Simon Guggenheim Memorial Foundation (2005–06). In the Spring of 2010, Sorkin was a Fellow at the Swedish Collegium for Advanced Study in Uppsala, Sweden. He is a fellow of the American Academy for Jewish Research.

== Awards ==
- 1988 Joel H. Cavior Literary Award for History (The Transformation of German Jewry)
- 2003 National Jewish Book Award for Scholarship (Oxford Handbook of Jewish Studies)
- 2010 Dorothy and Hsin-Nung Yao Teaching Award (History, UW-Madison)
- 2019 Moses Mendelssohn Award (Leo Baeck Institute, New York)

== Bibliography ==
- Jewish Emancipation: A History Across Five Centuries (Princeton University Press, 2019) ISBN 978-0691164946
- The Transformation of German Jewry, 1780–1840 (Oxford University Press, 1987) (pbk. 1990); New edition (Wayne State University Press, 1999) ISBN 978-0814328286
- The Religious Enlightenment: Protestants, Jews, and Catholics from London to Vienna (Jews, Christians, and Muslims from the Ancient to the Modern World) (Princeton University Press, 2008) ISBN 978-0691135021
- Berlin Haskalah and German Religious Thought: Orphans of Knowledge (Parkes-Wiener Series on Jewish Studies) (Vallentine Mitchell, 1999) ISBN 978-0853033653
- Moses Mendelssohn and the Religious Enlightenment (Jewish Thinkers) (University of California Press, 1996) ISBN 0-520-20261-9

== See also ==
- Port Jew
