= John Bell-Irving =

Scottish businessman

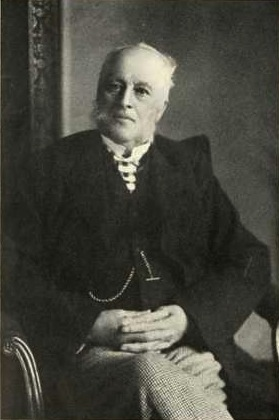
John Bell-Irving

John Bell-Irving, JP (2 February 1846 – 1925) was a Scottish businessman in Hong Kong. He was a partner of the Jardine Matheson & Co., one of the leading trading firm in the Far East.

He was the eldest son of John Bell-Irving of Whitehill, a director of Hongkong Electric Company and partner of the Jardine Matheson & Co. His mother, Mary Jardine, was a nephew of William Jardine and sister of Sir Robert Jardine, the founders of the Jardine Matheson. He arrived in Hong Kong in 1872 and succeeded his father to become a partner of the Jardine Matheson from 1876 to 1891. He is also vice-chairman of the Hong Kong General Chamber of Commerce, member of the City Hall Committee and the St. Paul's College, steward of the Hong Kong Jockey Club, president of Polo Club, chairman of the China Sugar Refining Co., director of the Hongkong and Whampoa Dock Co. Ltd. and the Hongkong, Canton & Macao Steam-Boat Co. Ltd., member of consulting committee of the Douglas Steamship Co.

He was made Justice of the Peace and was appointed one of the six members of the Legislative Council of Hong Kong in 1886 and 1887. His younger brother, James Jardine Bell-Irving, was also member of the Executive and Legislative Councils of Hong Kong.

He married Isabella Thornton of Henry Thornton and Louisa Bannerman Thornton, a niece of Williamina MacKenzie, wife of Colonial Secretary of Hong Kong, William Marsh. They had one son, Major John Bell-Irving.

Legislative Council of Hong Kong
Preceded by William Keswick	Unofficial Member; 1886	Succeeded by William Keswick
Preceded by William Keswick	Unofficial Member; 1887–1889	Succeeded by James Johnstone Keswick
