= James Johnstone Keswick =

Scottish businessman

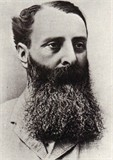
J. J. Keswick

James Johnstone Keswick (1845–1914) was a Scottish businessman in China and Hong Kong. He was the taipan of the Jardine Matheson & Co.

== Biography ==
He was the son of the Thomas Keswick, and younger brother of William Keswick, who was the founder of the Keswick family. He arrived in the Far East in 1870 and remained there for 26 years. He became a partner of the Messrs Jardine, Matheson & co. and taipan of the firm from the 1890s. He founded Hongkong Land together with his close associate Sir Paul Chater. This was a development company established in 1889 which remained closely associated with Jardine Matheson. Chater and J. J. Keswick became permanent joint managing directors of the new company.

He was also appointed as unofficial member of the Legislative Council and Executive Council of Hong Kong, chairman of the Hongkong and Shanghai Banking Corporation and Hong Kong Fire. He was the chairman of the Hong Kong General Chamber of Commerce in five terms between 1890 and 1900.

He had been resident in Japan, Shanghai, and Hong Kong. During his residence in China he was one of the best known figures in the foreign community, in which was nicknamed "James the bloody polite".

He married Marion "Minnie" Parkes, who was the daughter of Harry Smith Parkes, former British minister in Tokyo and Beijing.

He died at a hotel at Bath, Somerset, at the age of 68, in 1914.

== See also ==
- List of Executive Council of Hong Kong unofficial members 1896–1941

Legislative Council of Hong Kong
Preceded by John Bell-Irving	Unofficial Member; 1889	Succeeded by John Bell-Irving
Preceded by John Bell-Irving	Unofficial Member; 1890–1896	Succeeded by James Jardine Bell-Irving
Preceded by James Jardine Bell-Irving	Unofficial Member; 1899–1901	Succeeded by James Jardine Bell-Irving
Political offices
Preceded by James Jardine Bell-Irving	Unofficial Member of the Executive Council of Hong Kong; 1899–1901	Succeeded by James Jardine Bell-Irving
Business positions
Preceded by William Keswick	Taipan of the Jardine Matheson & Co. 1886–1896	Succeeded by Henry Keswick
Preceded by N. A. Siebs	Chairman of the Hongkong and Shanghai Banking Corporation; 1901–1902	Succeeded by Robert Shewan
