= 1903 Hong Kong sanitary board election =

- 25 March 1903
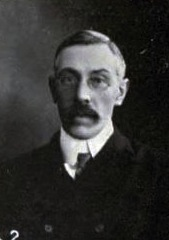

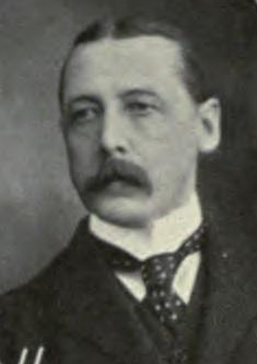

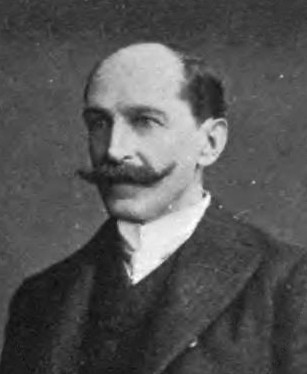
Nominee	Henry Pollock	Ahmet Rumjahn
Party	Nonpartisan	Nonpartisan
Popular vote	225	141
Percentage	38.0%	23.82%
Nominee	Edbert Ansgar Hewett	Augustus Shelton Hooper
Party	Nonpartisan	Nonpartisan
Popular vote	121	105
Percentage	20.44%	17.74%
Elected Members
Henry Pollock
Ahmet Rumjahn

The 1903 Hong Kong Sanitary Board election was held on 25 March 1903 was the second election for the two unofficial seats in the Sanitary Board of Hong Kong under the reconstituted Public Health and Building Ordinance of 1903.

Only ratepayers who were included in the Special and Common Jury Lists of the years or ratepayers who are exempted from serving on Juries on account of their professional avocations were entitled to vote at the election.

== Candidates ==
Candidates	Occupation	Nominator	Seconder
Edbert Ansgar Hewett	Agent, P&O	J. H. Lewis	E. W. Mitchell
Augustus Shelton Hooper	Secretary, Hongkong Land	Edward Osborne	W. A. Curickshank
Henry Pollock, K.C.	Barrister-at-law	Bendyshe Layton	G. Balloch
Ahmet Rumjahn	Architect	John Lemm	E. M. Hazeland

== Outcome ==
Henry Edward Pollock, the former Acting Attorney General and the member of the Executive and Legislative Council was elected.

Sanitary Board Election 1903
Party	Candidate	Votes	%	±%
Nonpartisan	Henry Edward Pollock	225	38.00	
Nonpartisan	Ahmet Rumjahn	141	23.82	
Nonpartisan	Edbert Ansgar Hewett	121	20.44	
Nonpartisan	Augustus Shelton Hooper	105	17.74	
