= Henry Humphreys =

Henry Humphreys was a Hong Kong businessman and member of the Sanitary Board.

Henry Humphreys moved to Hong Kong in 1889 to enter into business. He was the manager of the J. D. Humphreys & Son set up by J. D. Humphreys who set his office at the Alexandra Building. The J. D. Humphreys & Son was the general managers of the Peak Tramways & Co., A. S. Watson & Co. where he was the chairman, and the Humphreys Estate and Finance Company where Henry Humphreys was the liquidator of the Humphreys Estate and Finance Company, Limited. He lived on the Peak Road.

Henry Humphreys ran for one of the vacant seat on the Sanitary Board in the 1906 election. He was appointed by Governor Matthew Nathan to the Public Health and Regulations Ordinance Commission in 1906 to inquiry into the alleged corruption and bribery in the Sanitary Department, which led to the amendment of the Public Health and Building Ordinance to reform the Sanitary Board in 1908.

He left Hong Kong for home in 1933.
