= Alexander McConachie =

Unofficial Member of the Legislative Council
- In office 11 June 1894 – 14 December 1895
- Appointed by: William Robinson
- Preceded by: Thomas Henderson Whitehead
- Succeeded by: Thomas Henderson Whitehead

Chairman of the Hongkong and Shanghai Banking Corporation
- In office 1896–1897
- Preceded by: Jacob Silas Moses
- Succeeded by: Stephen C. Michaelsen

Personal details
- Born: 7 July 1840 Glenrinnes, Banffshire, Scotland
- Died: 18 March 1913 (aged 72) Stirling, Scotland
- Occupation: Businessman

Alexander McConachie (7 July 1840 – 18 March 1913) was a prominent Scottish merchant in Hong Kong and the member of the Legislative Council.

McConachie was born on 7 July 1840 in Glenrinnes, Banffshire, Scotland. He went to Hong Kong and was the partner of the Gilman & Co. and was the chairman of the Hong Kong General Chamber of Commerce in 1896, chairman of the Hongkong and Shanghai Banking Corporation, chairman of the China Fire Insurance Company at different times. He was also the representative of the Chamber of Commerce in the Legislative Council.

He died on 18 March 1913 at Mar Gate, Stirling, Scotland and the funeral took place on 20 March at Stirling Cemetery.

Legislative Council of Hong Kong
Preceded by Thomas Henderson Whitehead	Unofficial Member; Representative for Hong Kong General Chamber of Commerce; 1894–1895	Succeeded by Thomas Henderson Whitehead
Business positions
Preceded by Jacob Silas Moses	Chairman of the Hongkong and Shanghai Banking Corporation; 1896–1897	Succeeded by Stephen C. Michaelsen
