= Horace Percy Smith =

British accountant (1858–1928)

Horace Percy Smith (1858 – 12 July 1928) was a British chartered accountant in Hong Kong.

== Biography ==
Percy Smith was an accountant associated with his brother, Lawley T. Smith in the firm of Allen Edwards and Smith at Wolverhampton and Birmingham from 1893 to 1904 before he arrived in Hong Kong in 1904 to commence business in accountancy.

He was joined by Mr. Smith and Mr. Fleming as partners and he became a senior partner of Percy Smith Seth & Fleming, Incorporated Accountants, which became the leading accounting firm in the colony.

Percy Smith was a Freemason and was responsible for the advancement in the Far East. He held many high degrees and founded many Lodges and Chapters. He was the District Grand Master of the Grand Lodge of Hong Kong and South China and also D.G.S.P. of the Royal Arch Chapter. He was also made a Justice of the Peace in 1915.

Percy Smith retired in 1925 due to health issues for home and died on 12 July 1928 at No. 10, Marine-terrace, Barmouth, Merioneth, North Wales, leaving his widow, Ada Mary Smith and two sons, Captain H. K. Percy Smith of the 10/14th Punjab Regiment, Ferozepore, India and J. C. Percy Smith and a daughter V. K. Percy Smith. Percy Smith left estate of $31,492.37 in Hong Kong.
