= A. Shelton Hooper =

English civil servant

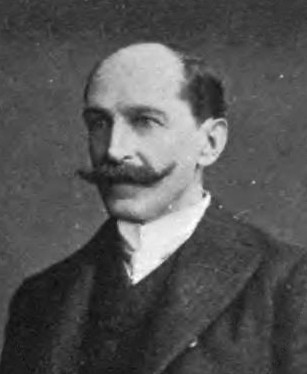
A. Shelton Hooper.

Augustus Shelton Hooper (September 1859 – 13 June 1936) was a Hong Kong English civil servant, architect, member of the Sanitary Board and Licensing Board, and secretary of the Hongkong Land Investment and Agency Co. Limited.

== Biography ==
Hooper was born in September 1859 to the seventh son of Henry Wilcocks Hooper, a solicitor & coroner for Exeter, and Julia Evelina Richards. He was educated at the Newton Abbot College, Devon.

He came to Hong Kong in September 1886 as a surveyor of the Land Office of the Hong Kong government. He was later appointed an assessor and municipal rates valuer in 1888 until his resigned in 1889 and joined the Hongkong Land Investment and Agency Co. Limited as the first secretary, being a land expert from the government.

Hooper was made Justice of the Peace in 1890. In 1893, he was made the agent and trustee for the Hong Kong and South China Masonic Benevolence Fund when it was established by the government under the Masonic Benevolence Fund Incorporation Ordinance. By 1905, he was an authorised architect.

He attempted to run for the Sanitary Board election in 1891 and in 1903 but was not elected. He successfully gained the seat in the 1906 Sanitary Board election and also the Licensing Board in 1910, where he was re-elected in 1916 and 1919. He served on the Sanitary Board until his retirement in 1911 due to his disagreement with government's decision of changing the Scavenging and Conservancy by-laws.

During his service on the Sanitary Board, Hooper was appointed by Governor Matthew Nathan to the Public Health and Regulations Ordinance Commission in 1906 to inquiry into the alleged corruption and bribery in the Sanitary Department, which led to the amendment of the Public Health and Building Ordinance to reform the Sanitary Board in 1908.

Hooper was a prominent Freemason in the colony, member of the Hong Kong Club and also President of the Hong Kong Devonian Society.

Hooper retired after thirty years service as secretary of the Hongkong Land Investment and Agency Co., Ltd. and left Hong Kong on 1 January 1920 and was granted a pension. He died in a London nursing house on 13 June 1936 at the age of 75.

== Personal life ==
Hooper was a member of the Royal Hong Kong Golf Club and Hong Kong Cricket Club. He resided at "Rougemont", MacDonnell Road. He married Sarah Hooper who died on 31 August 1942 in Matlock. They had one son and two daughters. One of their daughters named Christine Jessie Shelton Hooper, who married Colonel John Urmson Hope, son of Maj.-Gen. John Edward Hope and Mary Urmson, on 27 November 1907 and had children named Christine Mary Shelton Hope and John Patrick Molesworth Hope. Dorothy Annette Shelton Hooper, another daughter of them, married to John Farrar Macgregor at St. John's Cathedral on 30 August 1911. Their son was manager of the Manila Wine Merchants, a subsidiary of Caldbeck, Macgregor and Co.

Political offices
Preceded by H. E. Pollock; Ahmet Rumjahn	Member of the Sanitary Board; 1906–1912	Succeeded by F. B. L. Bowley
