= John MacNeile Price =

John MacNeile Price FGS FRGS (5 August 1843 – 11 November 1922) was a British civil engineer and the Surveyor General of Hong Kong.

Price was born in Marylebone, London, to Richard Evan Price, a merchant in South America, and Fanny Nugent Price. He was the first qualified and competent Surveyor General in Hong Kong's history from 1873 to 1889. He was conversant with electrical engineering developments both in Europe and America. He met with Layton and Wickham from the Hongkong Electric Company to develop electricity in the colony. As a result, the government offered $19,000 for fifty arc lamps and pumping water up to the houses on the Peak.

Price was also responsible for the redrew the proposal of the Hong Kong Observatory which Major H. S. Palmer initial proposal was rejected on the ground of cost in 1881. Price proposed the revised proposal to the Secretary of State for the Colonies in London in 1882. His plan was approved in Many and construction started in 1883. As the Surveyor General, Price was also appointed member of the Executive Council and Legislative Council on 11 December 1876. He was also Honorary Chairman of the Sanitary Board when it was first established in 1883.

He sued the Robert Fraser-Smith, founder of the Hongkong Telegraph in November 1883 who accused him of jobbery and corruption but lost the case.

He died in Tenerife, Canary Islands, Spain.

Government offices
Preceded by L. H. Moorsom	Surveyor General of Hong Kong; 1873–1889	Succeeded by Samuel Brown
Political offices
New title	President of the Sanitary Board; 1883–1889	Succeeded by P. B. C. Ayres
