= Raphael Aaron Belilios =

Jewish doctor in Hong Kong

Raphael Aaron "Arthur" Belilios (5 December 1873 – 19 June 1929) was a Jewish medical doctor and an eye specialist in Hong Kong and Shanghai.

== Life ==
He was the son of Sarah Gubbay (1857-10 Feb 1876) and Aaron Raphael Belilios (1842-11 Jul 1898), born in Calcutta, West Bengal, British India. His father's brother, Emanuel Raphael Belilios was a prominent Jewish merchant and philanthropist in Hong Kong.

Belilios obtained his Bachelor of Medicine, Bachelor of Surgery and Doctor of Medicine degrees from the University of Edinburgh in 1905 and became the Fellow of the Royal College of Surgeons (Edinburgh) in 1903. He returned to Hong Kong and began to practice in 1907. He was also a lecturer in physiology at the Hong Kong College of Medicine for Chinese from 1908 to 1912 until he moved to Shanghai.

During his residence in Hong Kong he resided at Kingsclere. He died at the General Hospital in Shanghai on 19 July 1929. He was pre-deceased by brother David Aaron Belilios (1875–1922) and survived by wife Mary.
