= Robert K. Leigh =

Robert Kennaway Leigh, JP (1852 – 1925) was an English-born Hong Kong architect, civil engineer and director of Leigh & Orange.

Leigh was born in Umballa, Bengal, India on 7 October 1852, eldest son of Major-General Robert Thomas Leigh, of Ilfracombe and Julia nee Vansandau. He was member of the Institution of Civil Engineers. He joined the architecture firm Sharp & Danby (name later changed to Leigh & Orange) in 1882. Under Leigh, the firm established reputation for institutional or public work, such as the Clock Tower Fountain in Statue Square, the Praya Reclamation Scheme, Queen's Building, the adjacent Prince's Building, Robert Leigh retired from the firm in 1904.

Leigh was also an unofficial members elected to the Sanitary Board in 1894.

He married Edith Haynes Lovell in Barnstaple, Devon, England on 18 October 1892 and had two daughters, Edith Rose and Eva Mary. Eva married Lieutenant Colonel F. C. E. Lumb in 1920.
