= William Hartigan (British physician) =

William Hartigan (about 1852, Limerick, Ireland – 11 September 1936, Oatlands, Weybridge, England) was a physician for the Hongkong Shanghai Banking Corporation, co-founder of the Hong Kong College of Medicine for Chinese and a brother-in-law of Sir Thomas Jackson.

== Life ==
Hartigan was born in Limerick in Ireland and educated at the Catholic University School and the Royal College of Surgeons in Ireland. He went to Hong Kong where he was a physician to the Alice Memorial Hospital.

Hartigan with Dr Patrick Manson and Dr Gregory Paul Jordan formed the Hong Kong Medical Society in September 1886. The Society established the Hong Kong College of Medicine for Chinese in 1887 which later transformed into the University of Hong Kong. Hartigan was also a professor at the school. Dr Sun Yat-sen, graduate of the school, mentioned him as one of his significant teachers.
