= J. D. Humphreys =

Hong Kong businessman

John David Humphreys (14 September 1837 – 8 November 1897) was an English merchant, chemist and druggist in Hong Kong. He was general manager of the A. S. Watson & Co., Ltd. and member of the Sanitary Board.

== Biography ==
Humphreys was trained for a commercial career and spent some time in India when he was young. He was attracted to Australia by the gold discoveries and spent years working on the field. Subsequently, he moved to Hong Kong in 1867 and became bookkeeper to A. S. Watson & Co., Ltd. Owing to his exceptional business aptitude he became, in conjunction with Mr. Hunt, another member of the staff, a proprietor of the firm on the retirement of the previous partners in the following year. Humphreys purchased Hunt's interest and became the sole proprietor in 1871.

Humphreys expanded the A. S. Watson & Co., Ltd. by establishing a small aerated water factory and opening branches in various districts and setting up branches all over China. In 1886, he turned it to a public company, in which, however, Mr Humphreys retained a large interest and continued as general manager until 1896, when his firm of John D. Humphreys & Son became general managers of the A. S. Watson & Co. and also Hong Kong High Level Tramways Co., Ltd, Olivers Freehold Miners, Ltd., and the New Balmoral Gold Mining Co., Ltd. He acquired the Mount Austin Hotel when it was winding up, and it was sold to the Military Authorities in 1922. He was also the first Chairman of the Kowloon College and provided financial support to the school.

Humphreys was a prominent public man, and, besides his interest in many public companies, was known as a prominent sportsman, he was for a number of years a Steward of the Hong Kong Jockey Club. He was also one of the first unofficial members elected to the Sanitary Board, together with J. J. Francis. They were dissatisfied with the limited power of the unofficial members and the neglecting and mismanagement of the municipal affairs by the governmental departments. In 1894, he brought forward his motion for the reconstruction of the Board with unofficial majority.

Humphreys had heart illness and was once attended by Dr. James Cantlie, the dean of the Hong Kong College of Medicine for Chinese the predecessor of the University of Hong Kong. Upon his recovery, he donated a sum of money to the college and named Sun Yat-sen and Kong Ying-wah, then the students at the college.

He was understood to be retiring from active business owing to an affection of the heart from which he suffered, and from which he died on 8 November 1897 at Folkestone, England.
