= Albert E. Mead =

5th governor of Washington

Albert Edward Mead
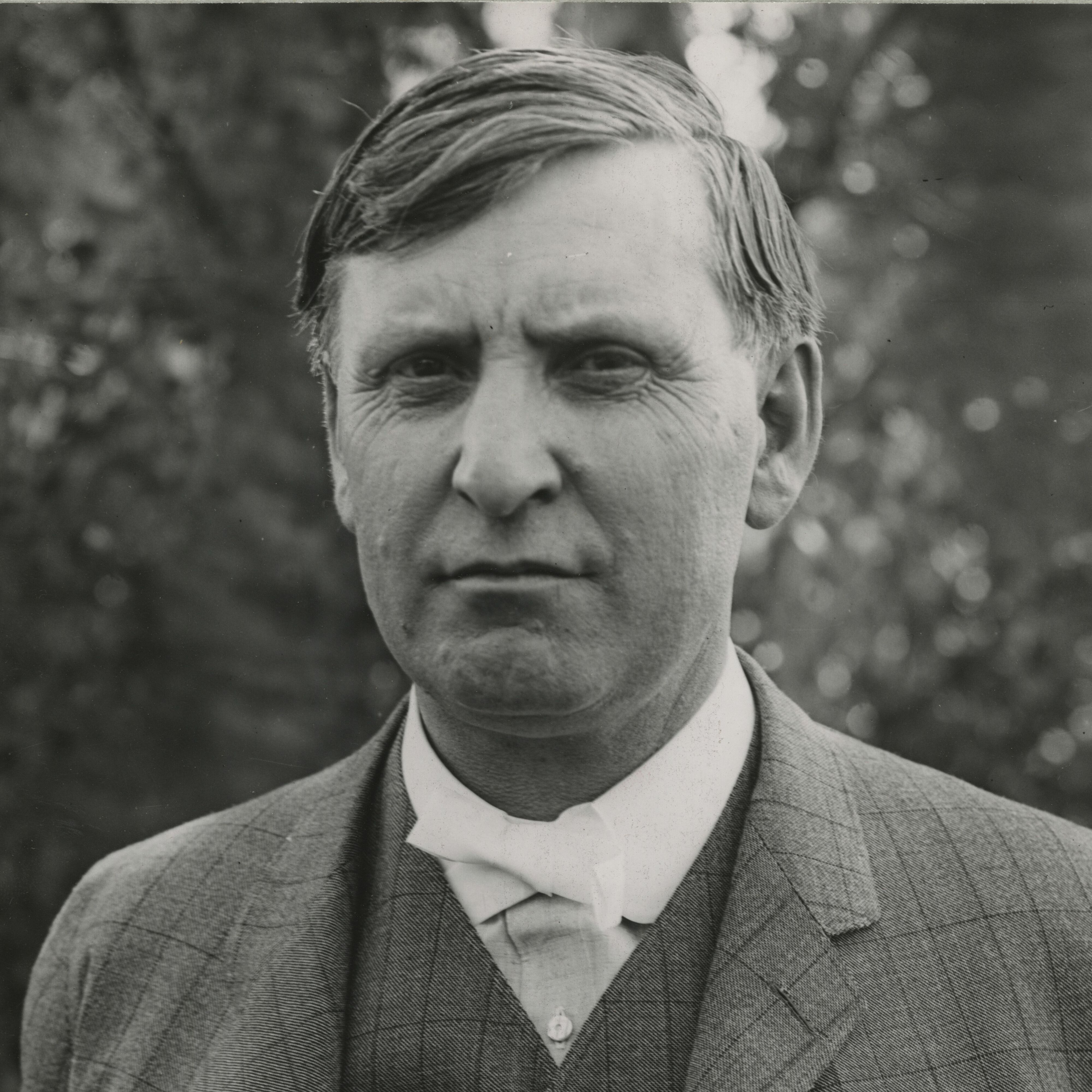
- Mead c. 1905

5th Governor of Washington
- In office January 11, 1905 – January 27, 1909
- Lieutenant: Charles E. Coon
- Preceded by: Henry McBride
- Succeeded by: Samuel G. Cosgrove

Member of the Washington House of Representatives from the 48th district
- In office January 9, 1893 – January 14, 1895
- Preceded by: A. W. Tiffany
- Succeeded by: R. J. Glen

Personal details
- Born: Albert Edward Mead; December 14, 1861 Manhattan, Kansas, U.S.
- Died: March 19, 1913 (aged 51) Bellingham, Washington, U.S.
- Party: Republican
- Spouse(s): Lizzie Brown (m. 1887; died 1898) Mina Jane Hosmer Pifer (m. 1899)

Albert Edward Mead (December 14, 1861 – March 19, 1913) was an American lawyer and politician who served as the fifth governor of Washington from 1905 to 1909.

== Biography ==
Mead was born in Kansas on December 14, 1861. There is conflicting information about his town of birth: most reliable sources say it was Manhattan, Kansas, but there is one claim he was born in Ashland, Kansas. He received his formal education at Southern Illinois Normal University and at Northwestern University's Union College of Law in Chicago.

== Career ==
After graduating from law school in 1885, Mead returned to Kansas to practice law for four years. He married Elizabeth "Lizzy" Pauline Brown and they had one daughter, Mary; and three sons, Wendell, Roland, and William. In 1889, he moved to Washington Territory. Mead served as Mayor of Blaine, Washington (1892), as a member of the Washington State House of Representatives (1892), and as prosecuting attorney for Whatcom County, Washington, from 1898 to 1903. His wife, "Lizzy", died in 1898, and on May 5, 1899, he married Mina Jane Hosmer Pifer, and they had one son, Albert Vincent.

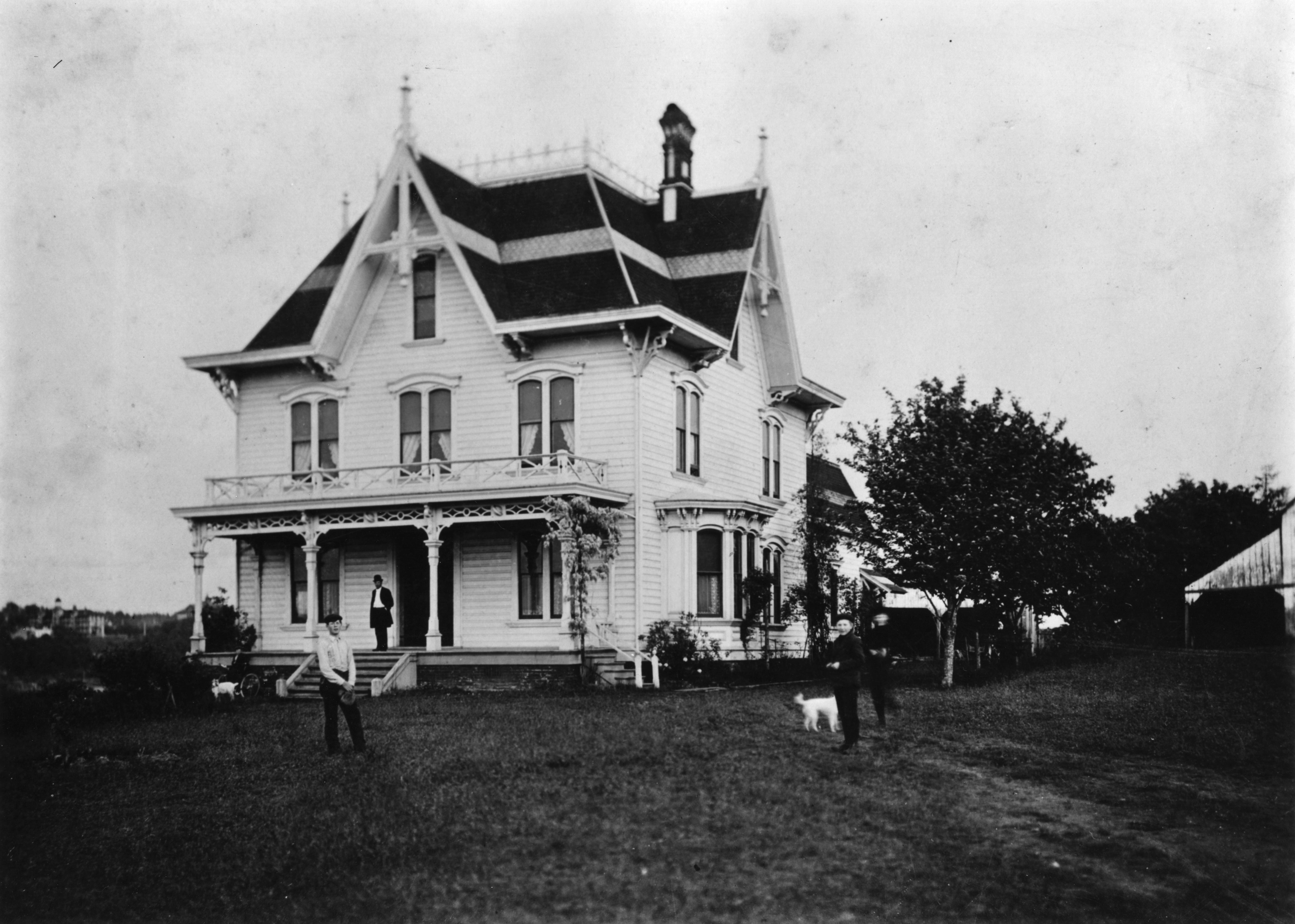
Mead (on porch) with Wendell, Roland, and William in yard, at Percival House, Olympia Wash, circa 1906.

Mead's election to the governor's office in 1904 over U.S. senator George Turner was considered a significant upset at the time. During his tenure, he supported legislation establishing a Railroad Commission, and acts establishing a State Bank Examiner, a State Tax Commission, and a State Highway Commission.

After his term as governor ended, Mead moved to Bellingham, Washington, where he returned to private practice as a lawyer and served as president of the Chamber of Commerce.

He ran again for Governor and lost in 1912 after changing to the Progressive Party and riding the coattails of Theodore Roosevelt.

== Death ==
Mead died in Bellingham on March 19, 1913, and is interred at Bayview Cemetery.

Party political offices
Preceded by John M. Frink	Republican nominee for Governor of Washington; 1904	Succeeded by Samuel G. Cosgrove
Political offices
Preceded by Henry McBride	Governor of Washington; 1905–1909	Succeeded by Samuel G. Cosgrove
