= List of people executed in Washington (pre-1972) =

The following is a list of people executed by the U.S. state of Washington before capital punishment was resumed in the United States in 1976.

One hundred and five people, all male, were executed in Washington state during the pre-Furman era, all by hanging. Two people, Cussas and Quallahworst, both Native American, were hanged on October 5, 1849, before the establishment of the Washington Territory in 1853. Both men were convicted of the murder of Leander C. Wallace.

== List of people executed in Washington (pre-1972) ==
No.	Name	Race	Age	Sex	Date of execution	County	Method	Victim(s)	Governor	Ref.
1	Leschi	Native American	Unknown	Male	February 19, 1858	Pierce	Hanging	A.B. Moses	Fayette McMullen	Ref.
2	Yow Lung	Asian	20	Male	August 15, 1873	Walla Walla	Hanging	Ching Nun	Elisha P. Ferry	
3	Joseph Nuana	Asian	17	Male	March 6, 1874	Jefferson	Hanging	3 victims (Note: William Fuller, Selina Jane Dwyer, and Harry Dwyer)	Elisha P. Ferry	
4	Harry	Native American	Unknown	Male	March 20, 1874	Kitsap	Hanging	4 victims (Note: 2 Bella Bella Indians, 1 Hydah Indian, and 1 White man)	Elisha P. Ferry	
5	Moos Moos	Native American	Unknown	Male	September 18, 1874	Walla Walla	Hanging	James Corrigle	Elisha P. Ferry	
6	John Thompson	White	30	Male	January 5, 1877	King	Hanging	Solomon Baxter	Elisha P. Ferry	
7	Saluskin	Native American	Unknown	Male	November 26, 1879	Yakima	Hanging	Perkins family	Elisha P. Ferry	
8	Kype	Native American	Unknown	Male	November 26, 1879	Yakima	Hanging	Perkins family	Elisha P. Ferry	
9	Bud Thomas	White	Unknown	Male	January 4, 1881	Walla Walla	Hanging	2 victims (Note: Sam Brumfield and Armedia Shanks)	William A. Newell	
10	Andrew Teuwepa	Native American	Unknown	Male	November 15, 1881	Stevens	Hanging	Gottlieb Reimer	William A. Newell	
11	Ezra Alexander Snodderly	White	25	Male	August 7, 1883	Columbia	Hanging	Eli Cummins	William A. Newell	
12	John Elfus	White	33	Male	January 15, 1884	Walla Walla	Hanging	Dan Haggerty	William A. Newell	
13	Jochin Henry Timmerman	White	Unknown	Male	April 6, 1888	Klickitat	Hanging	William Sterling	Eugene Semple	
14	Edward Gallagher	White	Unknown	Male	July 11, 1890	Clark	Hanging	Lewis Marr	Elisha P. Ferry	
15	Robert Thompson Day	White	45	Male	June 3, 1892	Cowlitz	Hanging	Thomas Beebe	Elisha P. Ferry	
16	Charles Brooks	Black	62	Male	September 6, 1892	Spokane	Hanging	Christine Brooks	Elisha P. Ferry	
17	Charles E. Meyers	White	Unknown	Male	September 30, 1895	Garfield	Hanging	Frank Sherry	John McGraw	
18	Charles Asimus	White	28	Male	January 31, 1896	Cowlitz	Hanging	James Greenwood	John McGraw	
19	Richard H. Straub	White	Unknown	Male	April 26, 1897	San Juan	Hanging	Leo Lanterman	John Rankin Rogers	
20	Gin Pong	Asian	38	Male	April 30, 1897	Spokane	Hanging	Lee Tung	John Rankin Rogers	
21	Jack Leonard	White	Unknown	Male	March 25, 1898	Whitman	Hanging	Jacob Malquist	John Rankin Rogers	
22	George Webster	White	31	Male	March 30, 1900	Spokane	Hanging	Lise C. Aspland	John Rankin Rogers	
23	Albert Michaud	White	Unknown	Male	April 6, 1900	Pierce	Hanging	Julia Meuret Michaud	John Rankin Rogers	
24	Martin Stickles	White	30	Male	January 25, 1901	Cowlitz	Hanging	3 victims (Note: William Shanklin, Cornelius Knapp and his wife)	John Rankin Rogers	
25	Eben L. Boyce	White	38	Male	August 9, 1901	Pierce	Hanging	Louise Bock Boyce	John Rankin Rogers	
26	Charles W. Nordstrom	White	51-52	Male	August 23, 1901	King	Hanging	William Mason	John Rankin Rogers	
27	James G. Green	White	Unknown	Male	December 6, 1901	Skamania	Hanging	E. V. Benjamin	John Rankin Rogers	
28	William Alden Seaton	White	23	Male	January 3, 1902	King	Hanging	Dan Richards	Henry McBride	
29	Lum You	Asian	40-41	Male	January 31, 1902	Pacific	Hanging	Oscar Bloom	Henry McBride	
30	Alfred Hamilton	White	29-30	Male	May 23, 1902	Whatcom	Hanging	David M. Woodbury	Henry McBride	
31	James Champoux	White	29	Male	May 6, 1904	King	Hanging	Lottie Brace	Henry McBride	
32	Charles Clarke	White	26	Male	September 2, 1904	Thurston	Hanging	Leila Page	Henry McBride	
33	Henry Arao	Asian	28	Male	June 3, 1905	Spokane	Hanging	Sam Chong	Albert E. Mead	
34	Frank Pasquale	White	28	Male	September 15, 1905	Pierce	Hanging	Charles F. Gray	Albert E. Mead	
35	Angus McPhail	White	45	Male	December 8, 1905	Snohomish	Hanging	Fred Alderson	Albert E. Mead	
36	William White	White	18	Male	March 2, 1906	King	Hanging	Matthew Murphy	Albert E. Mead	
37	Simon Brooks	White	46	Male	April 13, 1906	Clark	Hanging	Adolph Miller	Albert E. Mead	
38	A.A. Armstrong	White	53	Male	June 8, 1906	Lewis	Hanging	Robert Patton	Albert E. Mead	
39	Fred Miller	White	25	Male	March 22, 1907	Cowlitz	Hanging	Fred Dierk	Albert E. Mead	
40	Joe Nicolos	Asian	22	Male	April 16, 1909	Kitsap	Hanging	2 victims (Note: George Brown and unnamed four-year-old)	Marion E. Hay	
41	Joseph Gauvitte	White	44	Male	August 27, 1909	Spokane	Hanging	Elizabeth Gauvitte	Marion E. Hay	
42	Bud Barnes	White	26	Male	November 12, 1909	Walla Walla	Hanging	Anna Aldrich	Marion E. Hay	
43	Richard Quinn	White	32	Male	May 13, 1910	Snohomish	Hanging	Margaret Quinn	Marion E. Hay	
44	Frank Barker	White	23	Male	June 20, 1910	Spokane	Hanging	Ira Messinger	Marion E. Hay	
45	William Frederick Jahns	White	63	Male	April 21, 1911	Stevens	Hanging	Agnes Jensen	Marion E. Hay	
46	John Smith	White	26	Male	April 1, 1921	King	Hanging	3 victims (Note: James O'Brien, Volney L. Stevens, and W.T. Angle)	Louis F. Hart	
47	James Mahoney	White	38	Male	December 1, 1922	King	Hanging	Kate Mooers Mahoney	Louis F. Hart	
48	George Whitfield	White	22	Male	June 13, 1924	Clark	Hanging	Anna Nosko	Louis F. Hart	
49	Ralph Waller	White	34	Male	June 27, 1924	Garfield	Hanging	2 victims (Note: Alfred and Ida Waldman)	Louis F. Hart	
50	Thomas Walton	White	39	Male	December 12, 1924	Walla Walla	Hanging	S.F. Burt	Louis F. Hart	
51	L.E. Mosely	Black	45	Male	February 19, 1926	King	Hanging	A.J. Comer	Roland H. Hartley	
52	Alfred Winters	Black	30	Male	May 27, 1927	Cowlitz	Hanging	A.J. Comer	Roland H. Hartley	
53	Manuel Lopez	Hispanic	45	Male	February 15, 1928	Whitman	Hanging	Charles Markham	Roland H. Hartley	
54	Emmett Bailey	White	39	Male	August 10, 1928	Lewis	Hanging	Erma Skinner	Roland H. Hartley	
55	Wallace Gaines	White	48	Male	August 31, 1928	King	Hanging	Sylvia Gaines	Roland H. Hartley	
56	Luther Baker	White	61	Male	March 29, 1929	Clark	Hanging	Lester Wood	Roland H. Hartley	
57	Preston Rae Clark	White	39	Male	July 11, 1930	Walla Walla	Hanging	A.L. Bidwell	Roland H. Hartley	
58	Robert Lee Wilkins	White	44	Male	August 15, 1930	Walla Walla	Hanging	John W. Brooks	Roland H. Hartley	
59	Arthur Schafer	White	29	Male	August 29, 1930	Mason	Hanging	2 victims (Note: Mr. and Mrs. Joe Kirk)	Roland H. Hartley	
60	Archie Frank Moock	White	33	Male	September 12, 1930	Spokane	Hanging	Catherine Clark	Roland H. Hartley	
61	George Miller	White	48	Male	December 18, 1931	Spokane	Hanging	John Ivester	Roland H. Hartley	
62	Harold Carpenter	White	31	Male	April 15, 1932	Thurston	Hanging	Peter Jacobson	Roland H. Hartley	
63	Walter Dubuc	White	17	Male	April 15, 1932	Thurston	Hanging	Peter Jacobson	Roland H. Hartley	
64	Ollie Lee Stratton	White	24	Male	July 28, 1933	Jefferson	Hanging	William Frawley	Clarence D. Martin	
65	Ted Bradley	White	26	Male	May 11, 1934	King	Hanging	George Ikeda	Clarence D. Martin	
66	Byron Miller	White	42	Male	October 3, 1934	Yakima	Hanging	Marshal George Warring	Clarence D. Martin	
67	Hong Yick	Asian	44	Male	July 19, 1935	King	Hanging	Lee Wing Qmen	Clarence D. Martin	
68	Barney Fleming	Black	29	Male	April 3, 1936	King	Hanging	La Belle Butler	Clarence D. Martin	
69	Glenn R. Stringer	White	24	Male	May 29, 1936	Clark	Hanging	Herbert Lee Caples	Clarence D. Martin	
70	Leo Roderick Bernard Hall	White	34	Male	September 11, 1936	Kitsap	Hanging	6 victims (Note: Frank Flieder, Anna Taylor Flieder, Eugene Chenevert, Margaret Chenevert, Magnus Jorden, and Ezra Bolcom)	Clarence D. Martin	
71	Clifford Hawkins	White	25	Male	February 23, 1938	Skagit	Hanging	2 victims (Note: Ernest and Floyd Grimm)	Clarence D. Martin	
72	Claude H. Ryan	White	34	Male	February 25, 1938	Lewis	Hanging	S.R. Jackson	Clarence D. Martin	
73	Stanley Knapp	White	21	Male	August 5, 1938	Spokane	Hanging	William E. Walker	Clarence D. Martin	
74	Joseph O'Donnell	White	40	Male	November 21, 1938	King	Hanging	2 victims (Note: Trent A. Sickles and Theodore E. Stevens)	Clarence D. Martin	
75	Bernhard Leuch	White	41	Male	August 4, 1939	Mason	Hanging	Lena Leuch	Clarence D. Martin	
76	Paul Buttry	White	39	Male	September 15, 1939	Grays Harbor	Hanging	Hugh Warren	Clarence D. Martin	
77	Earl Talbott	White	19	Male	September 18, 1939	Walla Walla	Hanging	W.E. McKinney	Clarence D. Martin	
78	Roy Wright	White	19	Male	October 6, 1939	Yakima	Hanging	John Dee Moore	Clarence D. Martin	
79	Ralph Carson	White	54	Male	December 8, 1939	Clallam	Hanging	Lynwood Sproul	Clarence D. Martin	
80	Edward L. Bouchard	White	46	Male	September 6, 1940	Snohomish	Hanging	2 victims (Note: Cyril Ables and Ralph Allinson)	Clarence D. Martin	
81	Jack Marable	White	40	Male	October 4, 1940	Thurston	Hanging	Emil Roloff	Clarence D. Martin	
82	Arley Ovoyd Lewis	White	29	Male	January 30, 1941	Clark	Hanging	Jack Avent	Arthur B. Langlie	
83	Denzel Davis	White	24	Male	March 24, 1941	King	Hanging	Harriet Arnold	Arthur B. Langlie	
84	John Bruce Anderson	White	58	Male	November 14, 1941	Spokane	Hanging	David Johnson	Arthur B. Langlie	
85	Chester Montgomery	Black	29	Male	March 19, 1943	Spokane	Hanging	Jessie Sellers	Arthur B. Langlie	
86	Roy Willard Jacobs	White	41	Male	April 6, 1943	Pierce	Hanging	2 victims (Note: Chadwick and Harry Storem)	Arthur B. Langlie	
87	Persia Williams	Black	38	Male	September 8, 1944	King	Hanging	Joseph Romaglio	Arthur B. Langlie	
88	Edward Heberling	White	32	Male	December 8, 1944	King	Hanging	Harriet Louise Lindstrom	Arthur B. Langlie	
89	Joe Bill	Native American	30	Male	September 7, 1945	King	Hanging	Irma Irene McGough	Monrad Wallgren	
90	Joseph Bernard Wessel	White	44	Male	January 19, 1946	Pierce	Hanging	Mary Ann Wessel	Monrad Wallgren	
91	Woodrow Wilson Clark	White	30	Male	February 5, 1946	Spokane	Hanging	2 victims (Note: T.P. Dillon and Jane Staples)	Monrad Wallgren	
92	John Henry Clark	Black	26	Male	January 7, 1947	King	Hanging	Sam Katz	Monrad Wallgren	
93	Jake Bird	Black	47	Male	July 15, 1949	Pierce	Hanging	2 victims (Note: Bertha and Beverly Kludt)	Monrad Wallgren	
94	Arthur Bruce Perkins	White	24	Male	November 4, 1949	Thurston	Hanging	2 victims (Note: Mr. and Mrs. L.E. Jessup)	Monrad Wallgren	
95	Wayne Leroy Williams	White	33	Male	November 18, 1949	Snohomish	Hanging	Hallie Lucille	Monrad Wallgren	
96	Wayne Dale Odell	White	23	Male	June 18, 1951	Whitman	Hanging	Harold Rogers	Arthur B. Langlie	
97	Grant Ellis Rio	White	29	Male	December 10, 1951	Whitman	Hanging	Harold Rogers	Arthur B. Langlie	
98	Turman Galilee Wilson	White	26	Male	January 3, 1953	Clark	Hanging	JoAnn Dewey	Arthur B. Langlie	
99	Utah Eugene Wilson	White	22	Male	January 3, 1953	Clark	Hanging	JoAnn Dewey	Arthur B. Langlie	
100	Artell Bernard Farley Jr.	White	27	Male	December 15, 1956	Pierce	Hanging	Flora McFarland	Arthur B. Langlie	
101	Harvey John Collins	White	32	Male	December 3, 1957	Pierce	Hanging	Andrew Stolen	Albert Rosellini	
102	John Richard Broderson	White	34	Male	June 25, 1960	Clark	Hanging	Harold Oster	Albert Rosellini	
103	Joseph Chester Self	White	32	Male	June 20, 1963	King	Hanging	Ralph A. Gemmill Jr.	Albert Rosellini	

== Demographics ==
Race
White	81	77%
Native American	9	9%
Black	8	8%
Asian	7	7%
Hispanic	1	1%
Age
Unknown age	13	4%
17-19	5	5%
20-29	31	30%
30–39	27	26%
40–49	19	18%
50–59	4	4%
60-69	3	3%
Gender
Male	105	100%
Female	0	0%
Date of execution
1840–1919	47	45%
1920–1929	11	10%
1930–1939	23	22%
1940–1949	16	15%
1950–1959	6	6%
1960–1969	2	2%
Method
Hanging	105	100%
Governor (Party)
Fayette McMullen (D)	1	1%
Elisha P. Ferry (R)	10	10%
William A. Newell (R)	4	4%
Eugene Semple (D)	1	1%
John McGraw (R)	2	2%
John Rankin Rogers (D)	9	9%
Henry McBride (R)	5	5%
Albert E. Mead (R)	7	7%
Marion E. Hay (R)	6	6%
Louis F. Hart (R)	5	5%
Roland H. Hartley (R)	13	13%
Clarence D. Martin (D)	18	17%
Arthur B. Langlie (R)	12	12%
Monrad Wallgren (D)	7	7%
Albert Rosellini (D)	3	3%

== See also ==
- Capital punishment in the United States
- Capital punishment in Washington
- Lists of people executed in the United States
- List of people executed in Washington
