= Lloyd Gomez =

Executed American serial killer

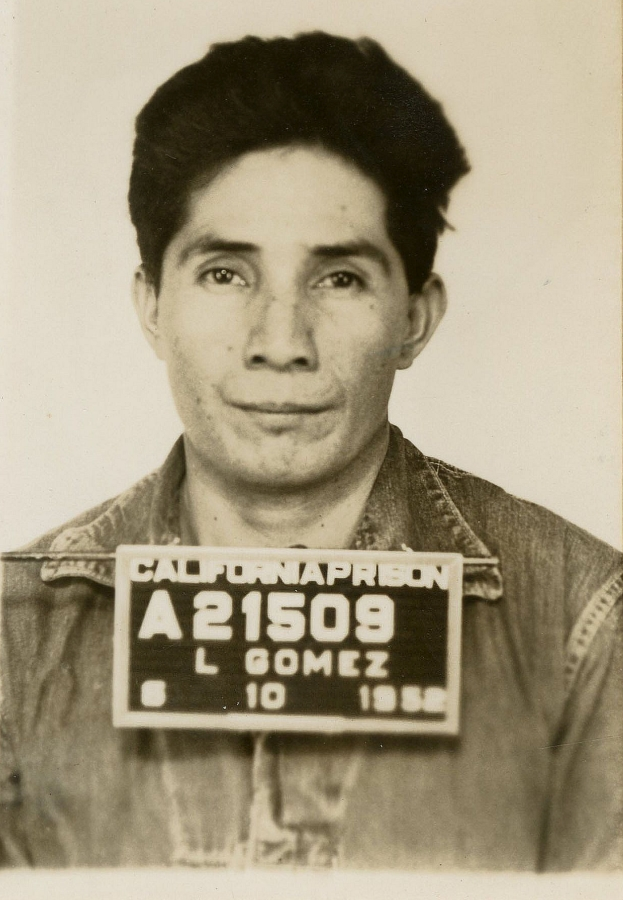
- Gomez on death row (1952)
- Born: December 6, 1923; Caliente, Nevada, U.S.
- Died: October 16, 1953 (aged 29); San Quentin State Prison, California, U.S.
- Other names: Harry Jenks "The Phantom Hobo Killer" "The Hobo Jungle Killer"
- Status: Executed by gas chamber
- Convictions: First degree murder Assault; Attempted robbery
- Penalty: Death

Details
- Victims: 9
- Span of crimes: 1950–1951
- Country: United States
- State: California
- Date apprehended: January 15, 1952

Lloyd Gomez (December 6, 1923 – October 16, 1953), known as The Phantom Hobo Killer, was an American serial killer who robbed and murdered nine vagrant men across California from 1950 to 1951. The murders were only linked to Gomez after he was arrested for a different crime and confessed to them. He was subsequently tried, convicted, and formally sentenced to death for the murder of Warren Cunningham, his second victim. He was executed in the gas chamber at San Quentin State Prison in 1953.

== Early life ==
Gomez was born on December 6, 1923, in Caliente, Nevada, to Native American-Mexican parents. His mother died when he was very young. Little is known about Gomez's childhood, but once leaving his parents' house in 1939 lacking formal education, he was never able to afford substantial living conditions leading to him becoming homeless. He is known to have traveled extensively around the west coast through freight trains. Later in his life, Gomez started to go under the pseudonym of Harry Jenks.

In 1942, Gomez was arrested but later released by Sacramento County deputies on suspicion of dodging the draft, since at the time the United States was at war with Germany and Japan during World War II. On March 26, 1942, Gomez accosted a 10-year-old boy in a field near Caliente. Armed with a knife, Gomez forced the boy to hand over his rifle, and once in hand of it threatened the youth before fleeing the area. He was later arrested in Cedar City, Utah, and was extradited back to Nevada, for which he was sentenced to two-and-a-half to 20 years in prison for armed robbery.

Lloyd was paroled in 1946, but was returned to prison after being convicted in 1948 for assault. He was brought to a prison camp, but one day when guards were not looking Gomez simply walked off, not to be seen again for the next two years.

As time passed, Gomez became more and more motivated by financial gain, eventually causing him to begin robbing and killing people. Gomez chose fellow homeless men as his victims, roughly middle-aged whom he often preyed on while wandering around railroad cars. He used numerous methods in his murders, including shooting them, beating them with a wooden plank, smashing them with a bottle, and bashing their head's in with rocks. One interesting detail is that Gomez appeared to have taken a 7 1/2 month break from killing during his spree. During the first series, it took Gomez over four months to kill three people.

== Murders ==
The first victim, an unidentified man, was killed in the summer of 1950, the cause of death being a wine bottle smashed against his head. The second victim was 42-year-old Warren Hood Cunningham who, on November 11, 1950, was shot to death after he accused Gomez of stealing his beer. The only witness to the killing, John Kapusta, could not identify Gomez based on the fact he was blind in one eye.

Just eight days later, on November 18 or 19, Gomez wound up in Mojave. While there, he murdered 50-year-old Earl Franklin Woods by bashing him to death with a large rock. After killing him, Gomez disposed of the rifle used to kill Cunningham and attempted to flee to Los Angeles, but was arrested by authorities on an unrelated charge for vagrancy, for which he served thirty days in jail before being released in December. Gomez simply returned to the homeless lifestyle without killing anyone for the time being.

On May 26, 1951, Gomez resumed his killing spree, this time claiming six more victims in little under four months. He beat to death Elmer Cushman who was sitting in a rail car, and pocketed $16. Ten days later, he used a wood plank to bash to death an unidentified sleeping hobo, and searched through his coat and stole $20. On June 22, Gomez was sheltering in Merced, California when he spotted 60-year-old George Jones walk into the hobo camp there and find a spot to begin cooking. Gomez snuck up behind him and bashed his head in with a rock, fracturing his skull and ultimately killing him.

On July 17, Gomez was wandering the railroad tracks near Roseville when he chanced upon Arvid Ostlund resting next to the tracks. Taking advantage of situation, Gomez picked up a large stone and dropped it on to Ostlund's head, killing him. In August Gomez's eighth victim, an unidentified man, was killed near the railroad tracks. On August 16, 46-year-old Roy Chester Hanson was sitting on a railroad car when Gomez spotted him and dropped a large rock on him.

As the bodies were being found law enforcement were contacted and they knew a serial killer was responsible, though numbers varied on the number of cases police believed the killer committed. As such, a total of twelve murders were investigated. On January 15, 1952, Gomez was arrested after police stumbled upon him walking the streets with a large slash across his face. In jail, he called police into his cell and gave detailed confession of all nine murders, and expressed his disappointment that nine men's lives netted him only $62.26.

== Victims ==
#	Name	Age	Date of murder	Date of discovery	Details
1	Unidentified, 1	Unknown	Summer, 1950	Unknown	Head injury which Gomez said came from a wine bottle that was bashed against the victim's head. Gomez collected just five cents from this victim.
2	Warren Hood Cunningham	42	November 11, 1950		The only victim to have been shot to death.
3	Earl Franklin Woods	50	November 18/19, 1950		Killed in Mojave. Head injury caused by a large rock.
4	Elmer M. Cushman	Unknown	May, 1951	May 26, 1951	Beat to death. Gomez stole $16.50 from the body.
5	Unidentified, 2	Unknown	Unknown	June 9, 1951	Beat to death.
6	George Jones	60	June 22, 1951		Beat to death near Merced. Gomez stole $24.50 from Jones' body, the largest amount of money he would get from a victim.
7	Arvid Ostlund	40	July 17, 1951	July 18, 1951	Beat to death near Roseville. Gomez stole $1.00 from Ostlund's body.
8	Unidentified, 3	Unknown	August 18, 1951	A week later	Beat to death.
9	Roy Chester Hansen	46	August 16, 1951	August, 1951	Beat to death. Hansen's body was found by railroad workers who were inspecting a train that had just arrived in Ben Ali, Sacramento, California.

== Trial ==
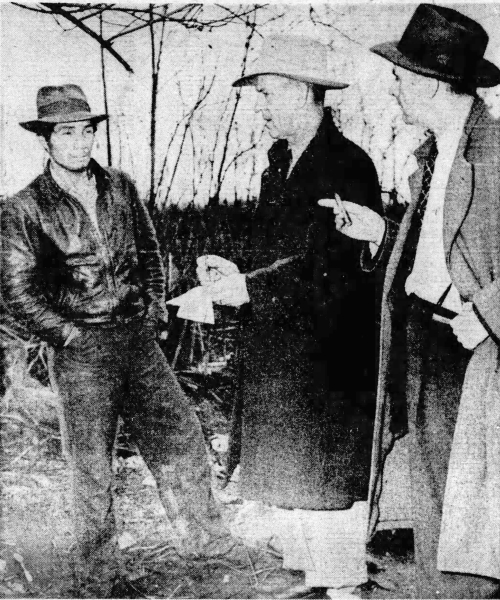
Lloyd Gomez leads detectives to the murder scene of Warren Cunningham

While Gomez described all nine murders in meticulous detail, police focused in on Warren Hood Cunningham, the second victim of Gomez. Gomez agreed to help investigators, and took them to the crime scene.

He claimed:

He went after me with two pocket knives, some guy down there had squealed on me and told him I stole his two cans of beer about four days before that. I ran. Boy, how I ran, and he was still after me. I got away and I waited about three hours, I guess. I got mad. I got so mad I couldn't stop. I had a gun buried over by the American River and I went back to his place with it. I knew what I had done, I ran. I went to Fresno. Then to Los Angeles. The idea was to go somewhere. Just keep going.

Gomez also brought attention to John Kapusta, the only witness to the killing. Kapusta claimed he knew Gomez as "The Indian", but after his arrest recognized Gomez by his voice.

Based on the circumstantial evidence and testimony, including Gomez' own word, he was charged with one of the murders, that of Warren Cunningham. Gomez never took back his confession, and during one court hearing said he killed "to get money to eat." Three state mental health specialists, R. B. Toller, Theo Miller, and Walter Rappaport, were appointed to see whether or not Gomez was capable of premeditation. Gomez' defense argued that due to the publicity surrounding the case, it would be impossible to select an impartial jury, and requested to superior court judge Raymond Coughlin that trial be moved elsewhere, something that he refused to do.

The district attorney of Sacramento sought the death penalty for Gomez. The trial began in June 1952. On the first day during the trial, Gomez ran out of his seat after seeing a guard opening an unlocked door, but was tackled before he could leave the building. On June 10, 1952, Gomez was sentenced to death and was transferred to San Quentin State Prison to await execution.

== Execution ==
On October 15, 1953, Gomez sat with interviewers and gave his final interview, in which he began eating his final meal, which was fried chicken, fried potatoes, peas, a tomato and lettuce salad, toast, apple pie and coffee. During the interview, Gomez was nonchalant in his attitude. Some of his responses include:

"Scared?"
"Naw, I ain't scared."
"Have you seen a Chaplain?"
"No, I don't want to see no Chaplain"
"Why?"
"I believe the same thing dad does. He don't believe in no religion."

The next day, nine hours after the interview, Gomez was executed by the gas chamber. He did not make a formal final statement, but his last reported words were to a prison guard, being "I don't want to live anymore."

== Manuel Gomez ==
On January 2, 1943, Gomez's father, Manuel Gomez, was arrested in Nevada for the murder of 47-year-old Jesus Maria Garcia, who was beat to death with a pick handle on New Year's Day. For the killing he received a life sentence after the jury recommended mercy. Four years into his sentence, Manuel was diagnosed with ulcers, and so had to be bedridden for most of his imprisonment. Four months after Lloyd's execution, on February 22, 1954, Manuel died at age 64.

== See also ==
- Capital punishment in California
- List of serial killers in the United States
- List of serial killers by number of victims
- List of people executed in the United States in 1953
