= Coral Court Motel =

Motel in Marlborough, Missouri, U.S.

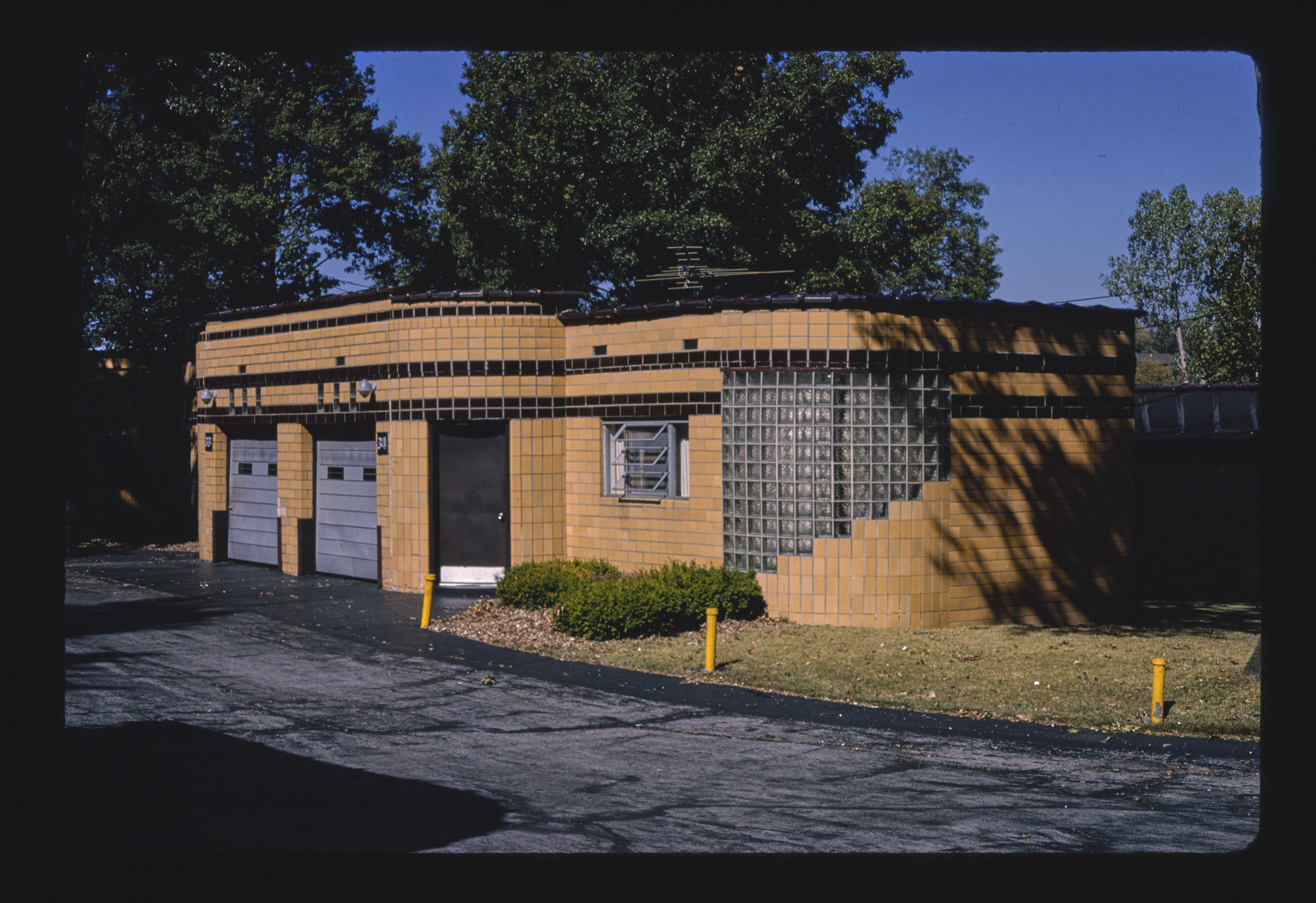
- Interactive map of the Coral Court Motel area

General information
- Location: 7755 Watson Road
- Opening: 1942
- Closed: 1993

Design and construction
- Architects: Adolph L. Struebig (1941); Harold Tyrer (1946)
- Developer: John Carr

Other information
- Number of rooms: 77 (originally 20)
- Parking: garage in each unit
- Coral Court Motel
- U.S. National Register of Historic Places
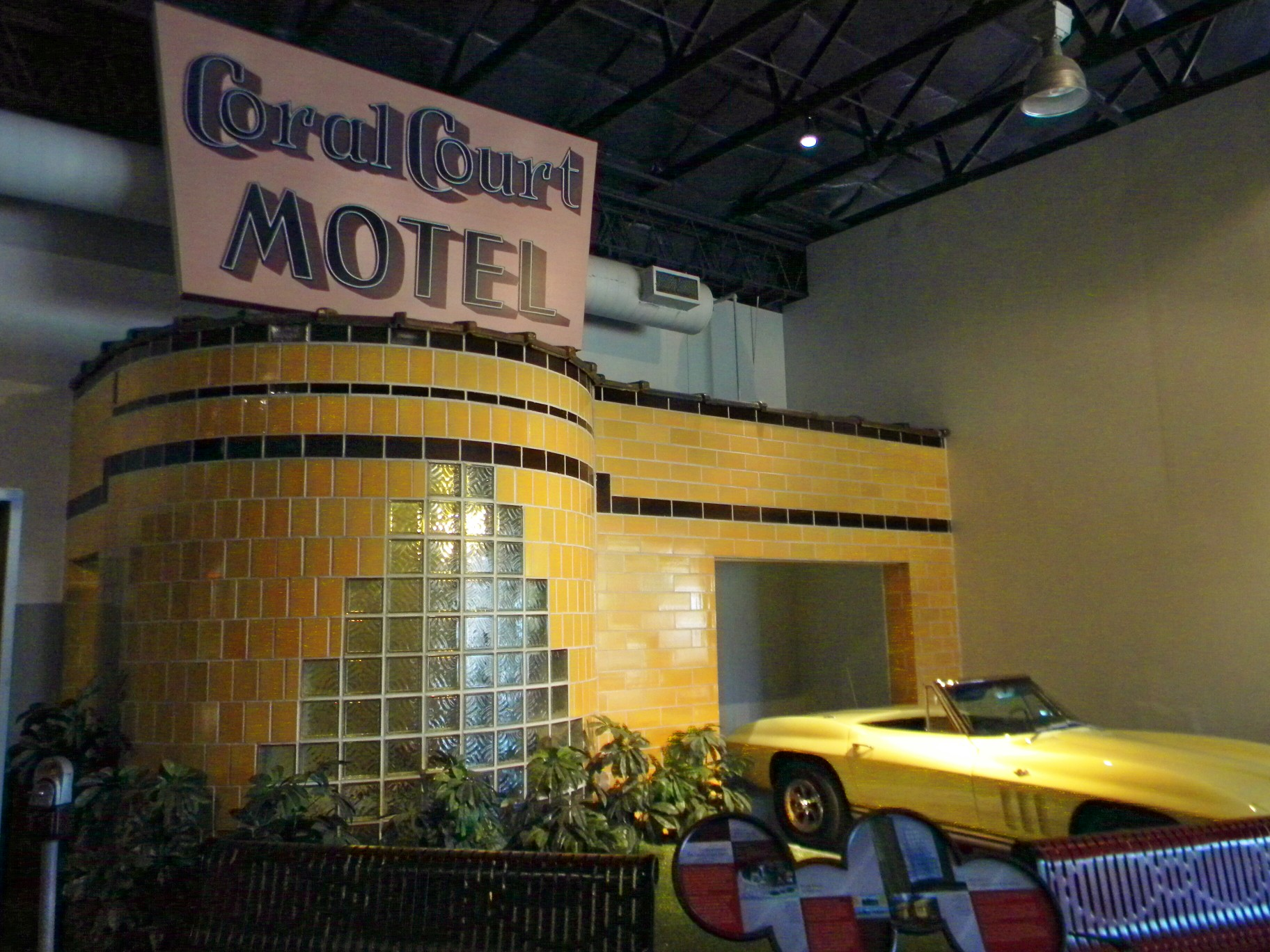
- Location: Marlborough
- Nearest city: St. Louis, Missouri
- Coordinates: 38.5722°N 90.3343°W
- Area: 8.5 acres (3.4 ha)
- Built: 1941
- Architectural style: Art deco and streamline moderne
- Demolished: 1995
- NRHP reference No.: 89000311
- Added to NRHP: April 25, 1989

The Coral Court Motel was a 1941 U.S. Route 66 motel constructed in Marlborough, Missouri (a St. Louis suburb) and designated on the National Register of Historic Places in St. Louis County in 1989 as a valuable example of the art deco and streamline moderne architectural styles. It expanded to 77 rooms in the heyday of automobile tourism on US 66, only to decline after the highway was bypassed by Interstate 44 in the 1970s and close its doors forever in 1993. Despite strong local efforts advocating historic preservation, it was demolished in 1995 for a suburban housing development now known as Oak Knoll Manor.

== History ==
John Carr opened the Coral Court Motel in 1942, during the US World War II mobilization effort. The original twenty-room motor court consisted of one main office building plus ten individual buildings with two units each. Built in the streamline moderne style with a minimalist glass brick and ceramic tile face, a garage for each unit occupied the center of the buildings. In 1946, 23 more two-unit cabins were added, bringing the site to 66 rooms; three two-story buildings were added near the back of the property in 1953 and a swimming pool installed in the 1960s.

The 1953 arrest of Carl Austin Hall, who briefly checked into the Coral Court on October 6, 1953 after fleeing Kansas City in the aftermath of the Bobby Greenlease abduction and murder, brought notoriety; while he and an accomplice were sentenced to death, only half of the $600,000 ransom was ever recovered. The ability to rent a room for short periods of time in complete discretion, with motorcars hidden from the street by the individual enclosed indoor garages, enhanced the Coral Court's notoriety as a popular venue for adultery.

U.S. Route 66 was the main road in the area until bypassed by Interstate 44 in Missouri at the end of 1972 and business during this era was brisk. The loss of traffic to freeway construction led to an overall decline for many US 66 independent businesses, but the Coral Court appears to have been maintained in good condition until John Carr's demise in 1984.

While Carr's widow remarried, took ownership of the property, and continued to operate the motel for several years, the buildings were allowed to decline severely. By 1988, the site was identified as at risk of loss to demolition, as she had twice sold options on the land to prospective developers for a shopping mall. Local preservationists established the Coral Court Preservation Society and were successful in listing the property on the National Register of Historic Places, but (unless public funds have been invested in a historic property) this listing provides no protection to a site. The motel, in very poor condition after years of neglect, ultimately closed in 1993 and was demolished in 1995. Its site now contains a 45-unit housing development, called "Oak Knoll Manor."

One of the two-unit buildings from the original motor court was carefully dismantled by volunteers for use as part of an automotive exhibit at the National Museum of Transportation in St. Louis. The exhibit, which was constructed in 2000, includes the façade of one motel cabin building. A 1941 Cadillac is positioned in front of its garage as part of a larger exhibit on automobiles of the era.

While nothing else remains at the site, attempts have been made at the local level to advocate the installation of a historic marker or signage to indicate where the motor court once stood.

== See also ==
- List of motels
