= Murder of Bobby Greenlease =

American child kidnapping case in 1953

- Bobby Greenlease and his father, 1953
- Location: Lenexa, Kansas, US
- Date: September 28, 1953
- Attack type: Child murder by shooting, child abduction
- Weapon: .38 caliber snubnosed Smith & Wesson revolver
- Victim: Robert Cosgrove "Bobby" Greenlease Jr.
- Perpetrators: Carl Austin Hall; Bonnie Emily Brown
- Motive: Ransom
- Verdict: Pleaded guilty
- Convictions: Kidnapping
- Sentence: Death

Robert Cosgrove Greenlease Jr. (February 3, 1947 – September 28, 1953) was a six-year-old from Kansas City, Missouri, United States, who was the victim of a kidnapping and homicide on September 28, 1953. His father, Robert Cosgrove Greenlease Sr., was a multi-millionaire auto dealer, and the demanded ransom payment was the largest in American history at the time.

Greenlease Jr.'s kidnappers, Carl Hall and Bonnie Heady, had no intention of returning him to his family, the child having been murdered before the ransom demand was even issued. Both perpetrators were sentenced to death and executed in Missouri's gas chamber in December 1953. Heady was the third woman ever to be executed by US federal authorities.

== Background ==
Robert "Bobby" Cosgrove Greenlease Jr. was born to Robert Greenlease Sr. and Virginia Greenlease (née Pollock), his second wife, on February 3, 1947. (They were married in 1939. Greenlease's first wife was Betty "Bessie" Rush, whom he married on March 3, 1913.) The elder Greenlease was a multi-millionaire car dealer and entrepreneur, having made his fortune by introducing General Motors vehicles to the Great Plains in the early twentieth century, owning dealerships from Texas to South Dakota. He was 65 years old when Bobby was born in 1947. The Greenleases were said to have been devoted to Bobby.

According to author John Heidenry, Bobby was said to be a trusting boy; Bonnie Heady later stated that from the moment she appeared at his school posing as his aunt to take him to his mother, he just took her hand and did anything he was told to do.

== Abduction and murder ==
Carl Hall (left) and Bonnie Heady (right)

In September 1953, Carl Hall (34) and Bonnie Heady (41), kidnapped Bobby from Notre Dame de Sion, a Catholic pre-school located in Kansas City, Missouri. The kidnappers were drug-addicted alcoholics then living together in nearby St. Joseph. In the early 1930s, Hall had attended Kemper Military School in Boonville with Paul Robert Greenlease, Bobby's adopted older brother. Hall had planned for years to victimize his former classmate's wealthy family.

Heady visited Bobby's school and persuaded a nun, Sister Morand, that she was his aunt, telling her that his mother had suffered a heart attack and was in St. Mary's Hospital. She then took Bobby away in a taxi driven by John Oliver Hager, of the Ace Cab Company, who later testified in court. When another nun from the school rang to inquire about Virginia Greenlease's condition, she discovered the truth and her husband contacted the Federal Bureau of Investigation (FBI). Hall and Heady took the child across the state line to Johnson County, Kansas, where Hall shot him dead with a snubnosed .38 caliber revolver after a failed attempt to strangle him. They then took the child's body to St. Joseph and buried him in the backyard of Heady's house, at 1201 South 38th Street.

== Ransom ==
After the murder, Hall and Heady sent Bobby's father messages in the mail and phone calls demanding a ransom of $600,000 ($7.2 million today). Greenlease, trying to save his son, held off the authorities and paid the money. At that time, it was the largest ransom ever paid in American history, and remained so until the 1972 kidnapping of Virginia Piper. Hall became convinced that police would trace him and Heady to St. Joseph, so he drove to St. Louis. The couple collected the ransom and fled.

== Arrest ==
Once in St. Louis, Hall left Heady in the middle of the night in a rented room. He contacted criminal associates to enlist their help in diverting police attention. One of the associates, a former sex worker named Sandra O'Day, was supposed to fly to Los Angeles and mail a letter Hall had written. It was thought that this would divert police attention from St. Louis. However, O'Day caught a glimpse of the ransom money. St. Louis police soon learned that Hall was flaunting a large sum of money, and they brought him in for questioning.

Hall eventually implicated Heady. The police found her at an apartment at 4504 Arsenal Street and discovered Bobby's body in a shallow grave in her back yard. Bobby was later interred in the family mausoleum at Forest Hill Calvary Cemetery in Kansas City.

== Trial and execution ==
Bobby's kidnapping and murder scandalized the nation. Because he had been taken over state lines, the crime became a federal case under the Federal Kidnapping Act. Hall and Heady both pleaded guilty to kidnapping. The jury deliberated for an hour and eight minutes before recommending a death sentence. The two were executed together in the Missouri gas chamber on December 18, 1953. Only 81 days passed between the crime and the executions. Neither Hall nor Heady made any attempts to appeal.

Heady is one of only four women to have ever been executed by federal authorities as of 2021: the others being Lincoln assassination conspirator Mary Surratt in 1865 and Ethel Rosenberg, who, along with her husband Julius, was convicted of being a Soviet spy and executed by electric chair on June 19, 1953, just months before Heady. The fourth woman, Lisa Montgomery of Kansas, was executed by lethal injection on January 13, 2021, for the 2004 murder of Bobbie Jo Stinnett.

On 18 December 1953, Carl Austin Hall and Bonnie Heady were executed together in Missouri's gas chamber at the Missouri State Penitentiary. Hall was pronounced dead at 12:12 a.m., with Heady pronounced dead 20 seconds later. Since the federal government did not have any execution facilities, state facilities were used to carry out federal executions. The Missouri State Penitentiary gas chamber was used for Hall and Heady's execution, as well as that of other federal prisoners sentenced to death. Federal executions resumed in 2001 with the execution of Timothy McVeigh at the United States Penitentiary, Terre Haute, Indiana. Heady is the only woman executed by the federal government by gassing and is buried in Clearmont, Nodaway County, Missouri, where she grew up.

Only $288,000 of the ransom money was recovered. The missing $312,000 remained a subject of wide speculation. Some of the theories accounting for this were:

- A cab driver who took Hall to the Coral Court Motel had tipped off local mobster Joseph G. Costello.
- Hall tried unsuccessfully to bury the cash near the Meramec River, though the FBI later searched that area in vain.
- Suitcases in Hall's possession upon his arrest were not brought to the 11th District Precinct Station by the arresting officers, Lieutenant Louis Ira Shoulders and Patrolman Elmer Dolan. Shoulders and Dolan told a grand jury that the $288,000 they turned over was the full amount seized from Hall when they arrested him. This statement was determined to be false; it was alleged that Shoulders had taken the balance of the $600,000 ransom that Hall had in his possession at the time of arrest. Both officers were subsequently federally indicted for and convicted of perjury. Shoulders was convicted on April 15, 1954, and sentenced to three years in prison; he died on May 12, 1962. Dolan was convicted on March 31, 1954, and sentenced to two years in prison: in 1962, he informed the FBI that he had perjured because his fear of Shoulders exceeded his fear of prison. Dolan received a pardon from US President Lyndon B. Johnson on July 21, 1965.

== See also ==
- List of kidnappings
- Lists of solved missing person cases
- Capital punishment by the United States federal government
- List of people executed by the United States federal government
- List of people executed in the United States in 1953
