= T. J. Hampton =

American criminal (??–1901)

- Born: Thomas J. Hampton; United States
- Died: December 6, 1901; Lake City, Florida, U.S.
- Cause of death: Execution by hanging
- Conviction: First degree murder (2 counts)
- Penalty: Death

Details
- Victims: 5
- Span of crimes: 1887–1893
- Country: United States
- States: Florida, Georgia, and South Carolina
- Date apprehended: 1893

T. J. Hampton (born Thomas J. Hampton; Died December 6, 1901) was a 19th-century American serial killer who was hanged in 1901 for the murders of two men in Fort White, Florida. On the day of his execution, Hampton confessed to a further three murders committed in Georgia and South Carolina years prior.

== Biography ==
Little to nothing is known about Hampton's childhood. According to his confession, he committed his first murder in 1887, that of a train conductor while aboard a freight train in Lexington County, South Carolina. Being a drifter, Hampton had left the state not long after, successfully evading capture and not becoming a suspect.

During the years after, Hampton moved to Georgia, where he committed two more murders, but would not elaborate on the victims. By 1893, Hampton was working at a turpentine camp in Fort White, Florida. On March 25 of that year, Hampton shot at three white men. Sessom Calhoun and John Bell were killed, while J. W. Holliday, the third man, was wounded but survived. Shortly after, Hampton was arrested and charged with the two murders. He escaped from custody and was not recaptured until 1901. Hampton was then tried and convicted on two counts of first degree murder, and was sentenced to hang.

Due to an outcry of threats, governor William Sherman Jennings assigned state troopers to protect Hampton, who was African American, from a possible lynching. On December 2, 1901, Governor Jennings signed a death warrant which scheduled Hampton to be executed on December 6. On that day, Hampton was hanged at Lake City. Shortly before his execution, Hampton, who was smoking a cigarette, made a statement in which he confessed to the previous three murders.

== See also ==
- Capital punishment in Florida
- List of people executed in Florida (pre-1972)
- List of people executed in the United States in 1901
- List of serial killers in the United States
