= Jake Bird =

American serial killer (1901–1949)

- Bird's WADOC mugshot at the Washington State Penitentiary (December 7, 1947)
- Born: December 14, 1901; Louisiana, U.S.
- Died: July 15, 1949 (aged 47); Washington State Penitentiary, Washington, U.S.
- Other name: The Tacoma Ax-Killer
- Status: Executed by hanging
- Conviction: First degree murder (2 counts)
- Penalty: Death

Details
- Victims: 13–46
- Span of crimes: 1930–1947
- Date apprehended: October 30, 1947

Jake Bird (December 14, 1901 – July 15, 1949), also known as the Tacoma Ax-Killer, was an American serial killer who was executed in Washington for the 1947 murders of two women in Tacoma. He is also known to have murdered at least eleven other people across several states between 1930 and 1947. Prior to his execution Bird had implicated himself in up to forty-six murders.

In 1991, criminologist Eric W. Hickey, Ph.D., director of Alliant International University's Center for Forensic Studies, wrote about how the Bird case challenges stereotypes of serial killers, who are mostly thought to be Caucasian males, whereas African-American killers typically are associated with inner city violence. Hickey wrote, "Revelations that Jake Bird, a black man, had actually stalked and killed dozens of white women in the 1940s in dozens of states...continue[s] to challenge traditionally held profiles of serial killers."

== Kludt murders ==
At around 2:30 am on October 30, 1947, the home of 52 year old Bertha Kludt and her daughter, 17 year old Beverly June Kludt, was broken into by an intruder brandishing an axe. The axe had been taken from a shed, and the intruder had removed his shoes to sneak into the house. Bertha awoke during the break in. When she tried to pull out a weapon the perpetrator hacked her to death. It was reported when she was found, Bertha's head was nearly severed. Beverly Kludt was then murdered in the same fashion when she came downstairs to confront her mother's killer.

Two police officers sent to the Tacoma residence to investigate reports of screams from inside, saw a man run out of the back door and subsequently gave chase. The suspect was captured and taken to the Tacoma City Jail, where he confessed to the killings and identified himself as Jake Bird, claiming the murders were the result of a botched burglary.

The 45-year-old Bird had an extensive criminal record, including many counts of burglary and attempted murder, and had been incarcerated for a total of 31 years in Michigan, Iowa and Utah. Bird was a transient who had been born in Louisiana in a location he could not remember. He supported himself as a manual laborer and railroad gandy dancer, who laid and maintained tracks. His work on the railroad kept him moving from place to place.

== Bird hex ==
On November 26, 1947, Bird was found guilty of two counts of first degree murder. The jury fixed his sentence as death. On December 6, 1947, Bird was sentenced to death by hanging. After a motion for a new trial was denied by the judge, one of Bird's lawyers, J.W. Selden, said he had done everything in his power to defend Bird and would make no further appeals on his behalf. Selden then declared: "I feel whenever any man 45-years-old gets an idea that no lives are safe to anyone, except his own, that man is a detriment to society and should be obliterated."

After his conviction and death sentences were announced, Bird was allowed to make a final statement. He spoke for 20 minutes, noting that his request to represent himself had been denied and that his own lawyers were against him.

"I was given no chance to defend myself. My own lawyers just asked you to hang me. They apologized for defending me. If they were so reluctant to defend me, why did they contest the prosecutor’s proof of murder, and now say that everything is proven?"

At the end of his 20-minute impassioned speech, Bird declared that, "All you guys who had anything to do with this case are going to die before I do." This would become known as the "Jake Bird hex."

Five people connected with the trial died from heart attacks within a year. Judge Edward D. Hodge, died on January 1, 1948, at the age of 69. Joseph E. Karpach and Sherman W. Lyons, both aged 46, died on April 5, 1948, and October 28, 1948, respectively. Both men had been involved in the taking of Bird's confessions. Court reporter George L. Harrigan, died on June 11, 1948, at the age of 69. J.W. Selden died on November 26, 1948, at the age of 76.

A sixth man, Arthur A. Steward, a Washington State Penitentiary guard assigned to death row, died of pneumonia two months before Bird's execution.

== Reprieve, appeals and execution ==
Bird's execution was scheduled for January 16, 1948, at the Washington State Penitentiary, but he claimed to have committed 44 other murders and offered his assistance to the authorities in solving the cases. Consequently, Washington governor Monrad C. Wallgren granted him a 60-day reprieve and Bird was interviewed by police officers from several other states. Eleven murders were substantiated and Bird was knowledgeable enough about the remaining cases to be considered a prime suspect in all of them.

These interviews enabled the various police departments to declare many outstanding murder cases as solved. In addition to his Washington state murders, Bird had apparently killed people in Florida, Illinois, Iowa, Kansas, Kentucky, Michigan, Nebraska, Ohio, Oklahoma, South Dakota and Wisconsin. He mostly preyed on Caucasian women and dispatched his victims with an axe or hatchet.

During his reprieve, Bird lodged an appeal for a retrial with the Washington State Supreme Court, but was denied. His appeals to the federal courts – including three petitions to the United States Supreme Court – were also denied. For his last meal he requested fried chicken, strawberries and ice cream, and orange pop. He was hanged on the morning of July 15, 1949, at 12:20 a.m., before 125 witnesses. Family did not come forward to claim his body after his death. Several law enforcement officers took pieces of the noose as a souvenir. Bird was buried in an unmarked grave in the prison cemetery.

== See also ==
- List of people executed in Washington (pre-1972)
- List of people executed in the United States in 1949
- List of serial killers in the United States
- List of serial killers by number of victims
