= Martin Stickles =

Executed American serial killer

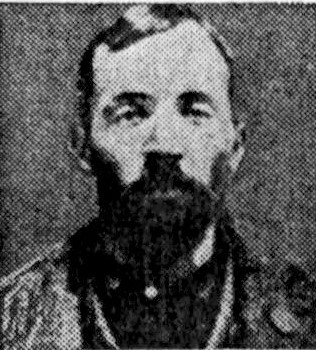
- Undated photograph of Stickles
- Born: February 7, 1870; Adams County, Iowa, U.S.
- Died: January 25, 1901 (aged 30); Kalama, Washington, U.S.
- Cause of death: Execution by hanging
- Other name: "The Kelso Killer"
- Conviction: First degree murder
- Penalty: Death

Details
- Victims: 3
- Span of crimes: 1899–1900
- Country: United States
- State: Washington
- Date apprehended: 1900

Martin Stickles (Note: Name has been erroneously spelled in contemporary newspapers as "Stickel" and "Stickels"; one source gives his name as "Henry Stickles".) (February 7, 1870 – January 25, 1901), known as The Kelso Killer, was an American serial killer who murdered three people in Cowlitz County, Washington, in 1899 and 1900. Convicted of these murders and sentenced to death, he was executed for the killings a year later, despite concerns over a possible mental illness.

== Early life ==
Stickles was born on February 7, 1870, in Adams County, Iowa, but was taken to Washington when he was 18 months old when his whole family moved to the state. According to his mother, Martin was born a sickly child and was "always unnatural". Little is known about his life before the murders, but by the time of the killings, Stickles was living as a recluse on a scow, sailing along the Columbia, Cowlitz, and Coweeman Rivers, earning a living as a fisherman.

== Murders ==
=== William Shanklin ===
The first victim was an elderly bachelor farmer named William B. Shanklin, a former neighbor of Stickles whom he had known since an early age. On November 22, 1899, while Shanklin was eating supper at the dinner table of his cabin in Kelso, Martin shot him with a rifle through the window, killing him on the spot. He then broke into the house and stole any valuable items he could find, including a watch from Shanklin's body before setting the house ablaze to cover up his tracks. Despite the local sheriffs' efforts to solve the case and a $300 reward from governor John Rankin Rogers, nobody was convicted. Another man, Edward Pierce, a weaver, was initially tried for the murder but later released, and it was claimed that Stickles had attended the trial.

=== The Knapp couple ===
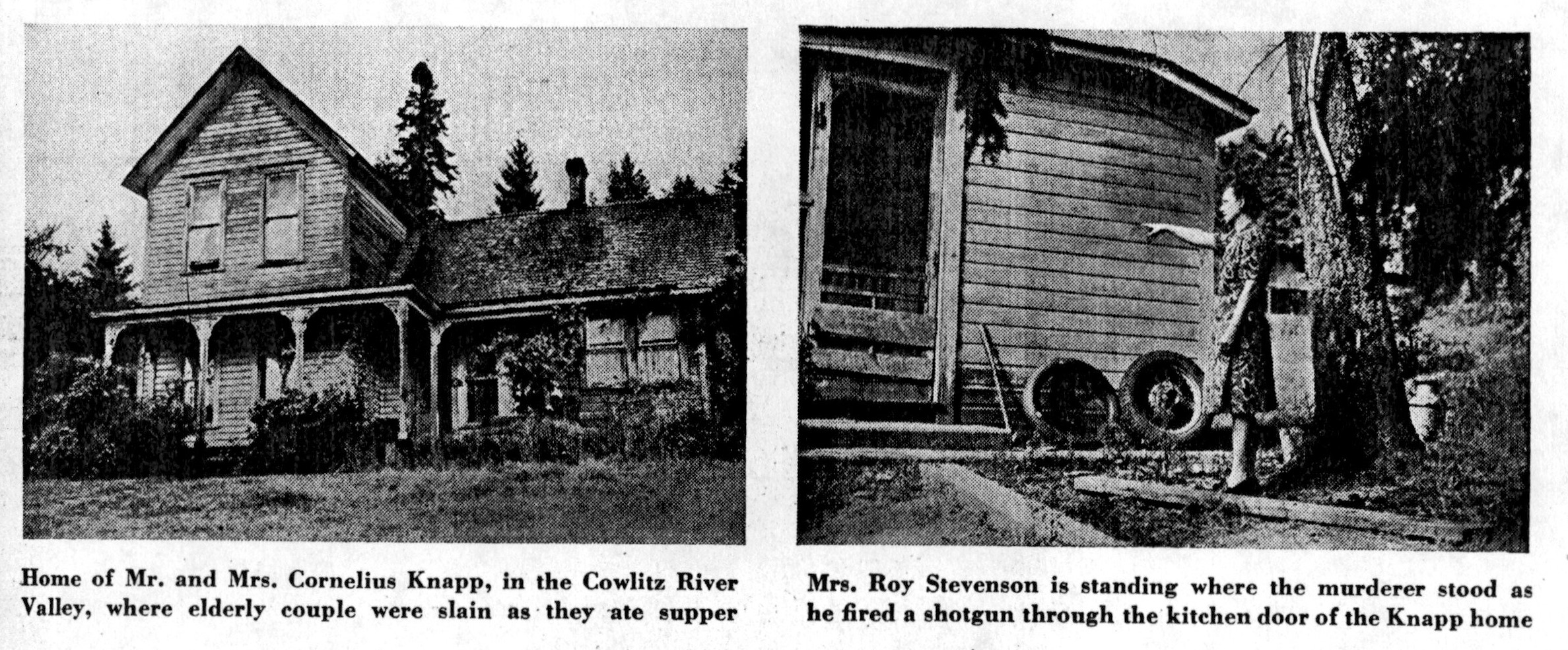
The Knapp crime scene

A year later, on November 28, 1900, Stickles traveled to Castle Rock, where an aged couple, Cornelius Knapp and his wife, lived. While they were having supper at their table, both were fatally shot with a rifle through a window. Mr. Knapp was shot in the neck, which severed his coronary artery. Like in the previous case, Stickles stole all the valuables, though he did not set the house on fire. At the time of their death, the couple had lived in the home for the last eighteen years.

== Trial and imprisonment ==
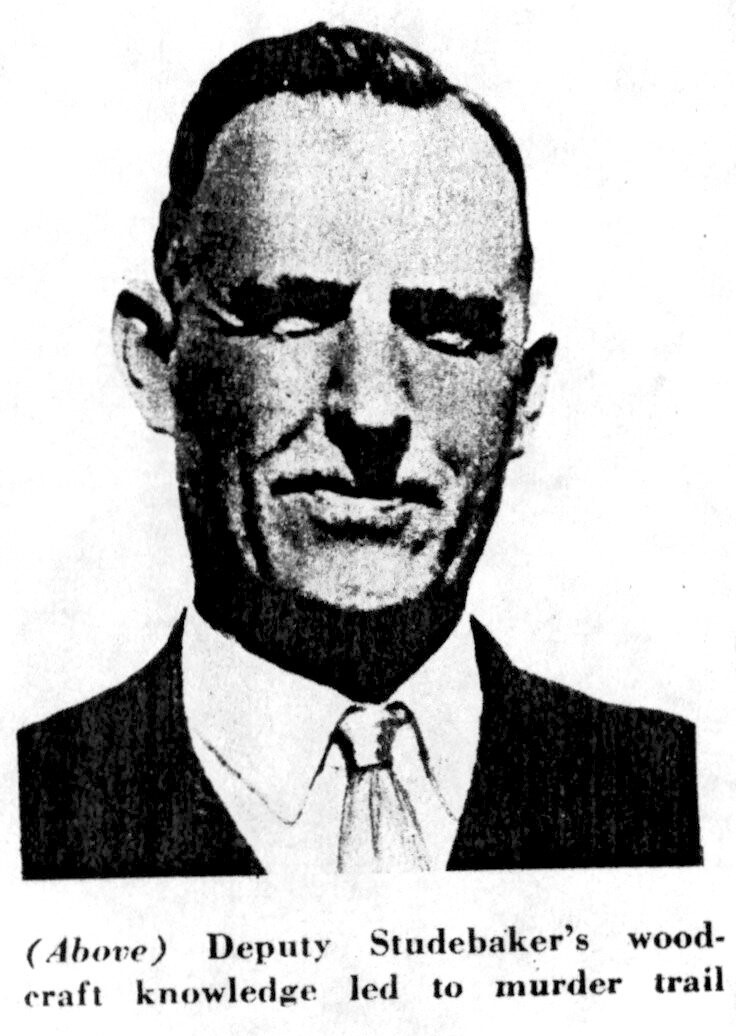
Dep. Studebaker

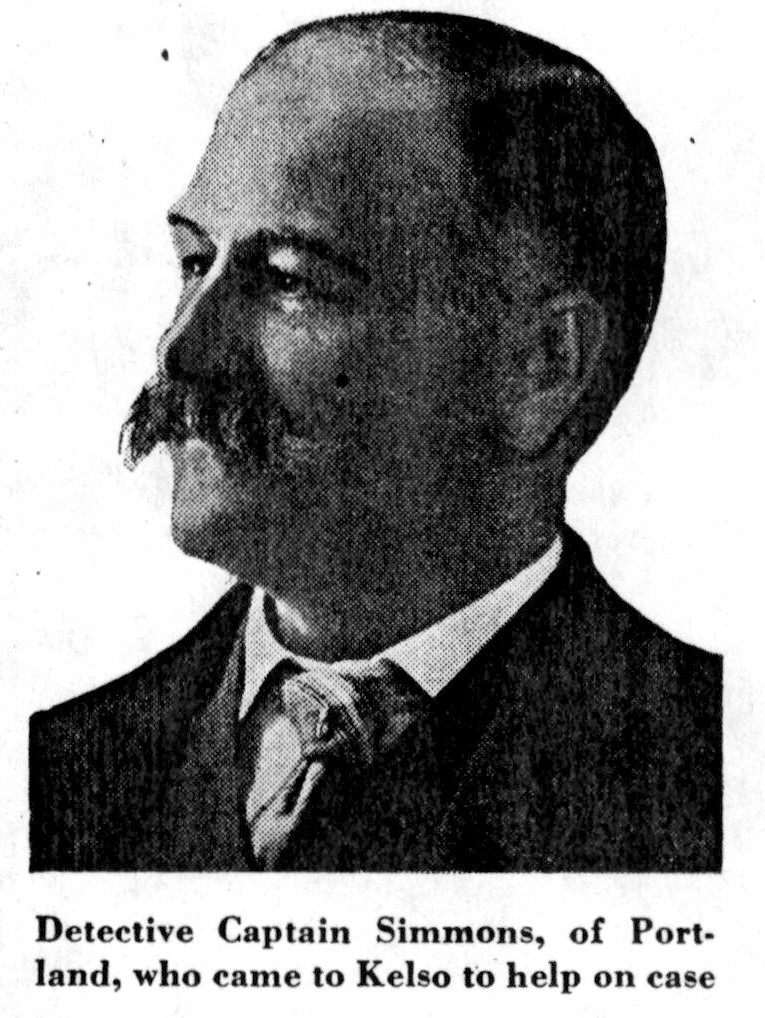
Det. Capt. Simmons

Stickles was brought in for interrogation about the killings, protesting his innocence until the investigators revealed that they had identified a watch and some keys as belonging to Shanklin. At that point, Martin confessed to all three murders but also tried to implicate a neighbor, Edward Pierce, as the shooter, portraying himself as a simple accomplice. In his version of the events, Stickles was swayed by the promised loot and did take an active part in the planning of the murders but did not take part in the murders. However, this claim was disputed by the sheriffs, who were convinced that there had been a single shooter since only a single pair of footprints was found in the snow leading to one of the crime scenes, and Pierce was confirmed to have been at his scow at the Columbia River at the time of the murders. While telling of the crimes, it was noted that Stickles had described them with childish indifference, only occasionally laughing at some parts and apparently feeling joyful when retelling the stories, unaware that he had contradicted himself in several instances.

While awaiting trial for the crimes at the Pierce County jail in December, the prisoners were visited by members of The Salvation Army. After one of the sermons, apparently moved by the preachers' words, Stickles decided to convert to the Christian faith and admitted before the priests that he alone had committed all the murders. Despite the looming possibility of a death sentence, Stickles remained cheerful and claimed that he would be happy with whatever sentence was imposed on him by the court. On the date of his arraignment before the Superior Court, he pleaded not guilty. His lawyers and family claimed that Martin should be treated leniently, as he was of unsound mind and had always been unnatural. Despite this, after only an hour of deliberation, the jury found him guilty of first degree murder for killing William B. Franklin, and Justice Miller sentenced the defendant to hang.

== Execution ==
On January 25, 1901, Martin Stickles was brought to the gallows, and after delivering a short speech to the attending parties, he voiced his wish that Jesus would embrace him in heaven. The rope was then put around his neck by newly appointed sheriff Elmer Huntington, assisted by J. M. Bush of Klamath. Huntington had named Bush as a special deputy to assist with the hanging because Bush had experience with executions in Arkansas.

After the drop sprung, he was killed almost instantly. However, the drop was miscalculated, resulting in flesh being torn off from the murderer's neck and blood spurting out from the wounds. After a few minutes, the psychiatrists checked for a pulse, confirming that Stickles was dead, and quickly turned over the body to his family for burial. While the final rites were performed, the attendees took notice of a mysterious veiled woman who left shortly after; it was later learned that she had been promised marriage by Stickles via a newspaper ad. This execution later served as a main talking point of an article discussing botched executions in Washington State, along with that of wife murderer Richard Quinn in 1910.

== See also ==
- Capital punishment in Washington (state)
- List of serial killers in the United States
- List of people executed in the United States in 1901
- List of people executed in Washington (pre-1972)
- List of botched executions

== Bibliography ==
- True Detective (August 1947 Ed.) - "The Kelso Killer", by Jerry Wallace
