= Murder of JoAnn Dewey =

1950 kidnapping and murder of a woman in Washington (state)

JoAnn Dewey
- Born: JoAnn Louise Dewey; October 16, 1931; Lonepine, Montana, U.S.
- Died: March 20, 1950 (aged 18); Skamania County, Washington, U.S.
- Cause of death: Murder by Carbon monoxide poisoning
- Resting place: Brush Prairie Cemetery
- Occupation: Nursing student

On March 19, 1950, in Vancouver, Washington, United States, 18-year-old JoAnn Louise Dewey (October 16, 1931 – March 20, 1950) was murdered by a pair of brothers, Utah Eugene Wilson (January 29, 1930 – January 3, 1953) and Turman Galilee Wilson (March 28, 1926 – January 3, 1953) who kidnapped and beat her while she was walking towards St. Joseph Hospital, where she intended to meet a neighbor for a ride home. Witnesses heard her screaming and saw two men force her into a dark automobile, but the men escaped before police could intervene.

Dewey’s nude body was discovered on March 26, 1950, in the Wind River in Skamania County. The investigation soon focused on the brothers who were arrested in Sacramento, California, on March 30, 1950. The duo were convicted in Clark County Superior Court of kidnapping and first-degree murder and were sentenced to death. The Wilson brothers were ultimately hanged together at the Washington State Penitentiary in Walla Walla on January 3, 1953.

== Murder ==
On March 19, 1950, Dewey was traveling from Portland to Vancouver by bus. After arriving at the Central Bus Depot in Vancouver, she called her mother to ask about transportation home. Her mother told her to walk to St. Joseph Hospital and Nursing School, where a neighbor who worked there could give her a ride home.

Between 11:30 p.m and midnight, nearby witnesses from the hospital and nearby residents heard a young woman screaming and struggling with two men near the street. The men punched and beat Dewey, forced her into an older dark Buick-type sedan, and drove away without headlights before witnesses could obtain the license plate or stop the vehicle. Vancouver police were notified, and officers responded to the area. Near the location where the vehicle had been standing, police found a strap from a woman’s handbag, a barrette, and a partially empty beer bottle. The next day, March 20, Anna Dewey contacted the Vancouver Police Department and reported that her daughter had not returned home and had not reached the hospital.

After Dewey was reported missing, Vancouver police organized officers and volunteers to search the area. Searchers examined parks, ravines, riverbanks, roadsides, and other isolated places in and around Vancouver. On March 26, 1950, three fishermen found Dewey’s body in the Wind River in Skamania County, near Carson, Washington.

Reports suggested that Dewey may have died from head injuries, but a postmortem examination determined that the cause of death was carbon monoxide poisoning. Investigators concluded that Dewey had been severely beaten, sexually assaulted, and placed in the trunk of a vehicle with a defective exhaust system.

== Investigation and arrest ==
The investigation soon turned toward brothers Turman and Utah Wilson, who lived in the Fern Prairie area near Camas, Washington. Both brothers had prior criminal records, and investigators considered them suspects after Utah Wilson’s fingerprints were identified on the beer bottle recovered at the abduction scene.

Police also examined vehicles associated with the Wilson family. A black Buick sedan and a cream-colored Pontiac sedan connected to the brothers were recovered during the investigation. Witnesses had described the abduction vehicle as an older dark sedan, and the state later argued that the vehicle description was consistent with the Buick the brothers had been using. The Wilson brothers left the Vancouver area after Dewey disappeared. According to court records, they spent much of the following week in Oregon before leaving for California in an Oldsmobile that Turman Wilson had purchased under the alias Ted E. Davis.

On March 30, 1950, the Wilson brothers were arrested in Sacramento, California. They had registered at a motel under false names, and law enforcement located them after tracing the Oldsmobile they were using. At the time of the arrest, Utah Wilson was carrying a .25 Spanish automatic pistol, and a six shot revolver was found under the front seat of the vehicle.

The brothers appeared before a federal commissioner in Sacramento on charges of unlawful flight to avoid prosecution. Bail was set at $25,000 each, which they could not post. They later waived extradition and were returned to Washington to stand trial.

== Trial ==
The brothers were arraigned in Clark County Superior Court on April 20, 1950. They pleaded not guilty to kidnapping and first-degree murder and were held without bail.

The trial began on June 14, 1950, before Judge Eugene C. Cushing Jr. The prosecution argued that the Wilson brothers abducted Dewey with the intent to sexually assault her, beat her, placed her in the trunk of a vehicle, and disposed of her body in the Wind River canyon after she died from carbon monoxide poisoning. Prosecutors emphasized three main points: Utah Wilson’s fingerprint on the beer bottle found at the abduction scene, the brothers’ use and switching of vehicles, and their conduct after the crime, including hiding from police and fleeing to California.

The defense argued that the state’s case was circumstantial and that no witness had positively identified either brother as one of the abductors. The Washington Supreme Court later acknowledged that no witness positively identified Turman or Utah Wilson as the men who seized Dewey, but held that the evidence was sufficient to go to the jury.

The brothers claimed that they had been at the Playhouse Theater in Portland at the time of the abduction. Defense witnesses attempted to support this alibi, but the testimony did not establish the brothers’ presence at the theater during the entire critical period. The Washington Supreme Court later noted that the brothers testified they were in the theater until after midnight, while other testimony placed them there only as late as 9:00 or 9:30 p.m.

The case went to the jury on June 28, 1950. After about five hours of deliberation, the jury found both Turman and Utah Wilson guilty of first-degree murder and kidnapping and recommended the death penalty for each offense. On June 30, 1950, Judge Cushing sentenced both men to death by hanging at the Washington State Penitentiary in Walla Walla.

== Appeals and execution ==
The Wilson brothers appealed their convictions to the Washington Supreme Court. On May 10, 1951, the court issued its decision in State v. Wilson, affirming their convictions and sentences. On direct appeal, the Wilsons challenged the sufficiency of the evidence, the venue of the murder prosecution, the admission and exclusion of certain evidence, jury instructions, and the denial of a new trial. The court rejected their claim that the evidence was insufficient, emphasizing that Utah Wilson’s fingerprint had been found on a freshly opened beer bottle near the abduction scene and that the jury could infer Turman was with him during the relevant period.

The Wilsons also sought a new trial based on alleged newly discovered alibi evidence from Eva Adams, who claimed that the brothers were in a Portland theater on the night of the abduction. The court held that the supplemental new-trial motion was untimely, that the evidence could have been produced earlier with due diligence, and that it probably would not have changed the verdict. The convictions and death sentences were affirmed, and a petition for rehearing was denied on July 13, 1951.

The U.S Supreme Court denied certiorari twice to the brothers both on October 15, 1951 and May 12, 1952.

=== Hanging ===
Utah and Turman Wilson were originally scheduled to be executed on August 20, 1951. On August 17, 1951, Associate Justice Hugo L. Black stayed their executions.

On October 30, 1951, Judge Eugene Cushing resentenced the brothers a second time, rescheduling an execution date for November 30, 1951.

On May 22, 1952, Judge Eugene Cushing scheduled the Wilsons to be executed on June 23, 1952. On the eve of their execution, Circuit Judge Albert Lee Stephens granted a two week stay of their executions.

On August 14, 1952, Governor Arthur B. Langlie granted a 90-day executive stay of execution so a special committee of attorneys could review the case. The brothers were to be executed on August 15. However, the brothers were re-sentenced a final time on November 24, 1952.

Turman and Utah Wilson were put to death by hanging after midnight on January 3, 1953 at the Washington State Penitentiary. Turman Wilson was executed at 12:06 a.m., and Utah Wilson was executed one minute later. They were pronounced dead shortly after at 12:16 a.m. Moments before they were executed, a telegram was sent to warden John Cranor ordering the Wilson brothers a stay of execution, but was quickly revealed to be fake and the executions had proceeded.

A handwritten statement was released after their executions in which the brothers maintained their innocence. Their execution was the second double execution in Washington state history after the executions of Harold Carpenter and Walter Dubuc who committed the murder of Peter Jacobson in Thurston County. It also marked the first time two brothers were executed together by the state. The brothers reportedly ate a last meal of fried rabbit and chicken, dressing, giblet gravy, french fries, cranberry sauce, cottage cheese, dill pickles, olives and lettuce, pie, cake and ice cream, milk, and coffee.

== Media ==
In 2018, a book by Pat Jollota was released titled The Murder of JoAnn Dewey in Vancouver, Washington

== See also ==
- Capital punishment in Washington (state)
- List of people executed in Washington (pre-1972)
- List of people executed in the United States in 1953
