= List of people executed in the United States in 1953 =

Sixty-three people, sixty male and three female, were executed in the United States in 1953, thirty-nine by electrocution, twenty-one by gas chamber, and three by hanging. Julius and Ethel Rosenberg, who were executed by the federal government in New York, became the only people to be executed for espionage committed in peacetime in the United States.

== List of people executed in the United States in 1953 ==
| No. | Date of execution | Name | Age of person | | | Gender | Ethnicity | State | Method | Ref. |
| No. | Date of execution | Name | At execution | At offense | Age difference | Gender | Ethnicity | State | Method | Ref. |
|---|---|---|---|---|---|---|---|---|---|---|
| 1 | January 3, 1953 | Turman Galilee Wilson | 26 | 23 | 3 | Male | White | Washington | Hanging | |
| 2 | January 3, 1953 | Utah Eugene Wilson | 22 | 20 | 2 | Male | White | Washington | Hanging | |
| 3 | January 9, 1953 | Morris Leland | 26 | 22 | 4 | Male | White | Oregon | Gas chamber | |
| 4 | January 9, 1953 | Frank Oliver Payne | 50 | 48 | 2 | Male | White | Oregon | Gas chamber | |
| 5 | January 15, 1953 | Joseph L. Paonessa | 42 | 39 | 3 | Male | White | New York | Electrocution | |
| 6 | January 16, 1953 | George F. Ross | 28 | 27 | 1 | Male | White | Ohio | Electrocution | |
| 7 | January 22, 1953 | Stephen DeFoe Lewis | 43 | 42 | 1 | Male | White | New York | Electrocution | |
| 8 | January 23, 1953 | Louis Allen Angel | 19 | 18 | 1 | Male | White | Ohio | Electrocution | |
| 9 | January 30, 1953 | Albert William Karnes | 24 | 24 | 0 | Male | White | Oregon | Gas chamber | |
| 10 | February 2, 1953 | Robert Gene Dessauer | 30 | 28 | 2 | Male | White | California | Gas chamber | |
| 11 | February 4, 1953 | Darious Daniel Goleman | 31 | 27 | 4 | Male | White | Texas | Electrocution | |
| 12 | February 6, 1953 | Roy Jack Hulen | 43 | 41 | 2 | Male | White | Texas | Electrocution | |
| 13 | February 20, 1953 | Leandress Riley | 32 | 29 | 3 | Male | Black | California | Gas chamber | |
| 14 | February 20, 1953 | Marvin Lucear | 38 | 36 | 2 | Male | Black | Ohio | Electrocution | |
| 15 | February 27, 1953 | Abraham Pinkney | 67 | 66 | 1 | Male | Black | Georgia | Electrocution | |
| 16 | February 27, 1953 | Roosevelt Spears | 48 | 44 | 4 | Male | Black | Kentucky | Electrocution | |
| 17 | March 19, 1953 | Emanuel Scott Jr. | 28 | 25 | 3 | Male | Black | Illinois | Electrocution | |
| 18 | March 20, 1953 | Albert C. Allen | 25 | 22 | 3 | Male | Black | District of Columbia | Electrocution | |
| 19 | March 21, 1953 | Samuel James Gasway | 35 | 33 | 2 | Male | White | Texas | Electrocution | |
| 20 | March 30, 1953 | Dominick Daverse | 40 | 34 | 6 | Male | White | Pennsylvania | Electrocution | |
| 21 | March 30, 1953 | Joseph Stephenson Phillips | 23 | 22 | 1 | Male | Black | Pennsylvania | Electrocution | |
| 22 | April 10, 1953 | John Solomon | 47 | 45 | 2 | Male | Black | Louisiana | Electrocution | |
| 23 | April 13, 1953 | Clayton Octave Fouquette | 39 | 34 | 5 | Male | White | Nevada | Gas chamber | |
| 24 | April 16, 1953 | Jesse Starr | 26 | 24 | 2 | Male | Black | Georgia | Electrocution | |
| 25 | April 16, 1953 | Frank Wojcik | 56 | 54 | 2 | Male | White | New York | Electrocution | |
| 26 | April 17, 1953 | Diamond Reed | 34 | 32 | 2 | Male | Black | California | Gas chamber | |
| 27 | April 17, 1953 | Oshel Gardner Jr. | 23 | 22 | 1 | Male | White | West Virginia | Electrocution | |
| 28 | May 1, 1953 | Lafayette Miller | 22 | 20 | 2 | Male | Black | North Carolina | Gas chamber | |
| 29 | May 8, 1953 | Amos Patrick | 34 | 33 | 1 | Male | Black | Georgia | Electrocution | |
| 30 | May 15, 1953 | Lovell Barclay | 37 | 36 | 1 | Male | Black | California | Gas chamber | |
| 31 | May 18, 1953 | Ollie Melvern Carey | 44 | 40 | 4 | Male | White | Pennsylvania | Electrocution | |
| 32 | May 18, 1953 | Charles Edward Homeyer | 55 | 52 | 3 | Male | White | Pennsylvania | Electrocution | |
| 33 | May 22, 1953 | Dario E. Amaya | 21 | 20 | 1 | Male | Hispanic | California | Gas chamber | |
| 34 | May 29, 1953 | Ulas Quilling | 52 | 50 | 2 | Male | Black | Missouri | Gas chamber | |
| 35 | May 29, 1953 | Raleigh Speller | 52 | 46 | 6 | Male | Black | North Carolina | Gas chamber | |
| 36 | May 29, 1953 | Clyde Brown | 22 | 19 | 3 | Male | Black | North Carolina | Gas chamber | |
| 37 | June 10, 1953 | Jack Farmer | 53 | 51 | 2 | Male | White | Texas | Electrocution | |
| 38 | June 19, 1953 | Julius Rosenberg | 35 | 32 | 3 | Male | White | Federal government | Electrocution | |
| 39 | June 19, 1953 | Ethel Rosenberg | 37 | 34 | 3 | Female | White | Federal government | Electrocution | |
| 40 | July 6, 1953 | Jimmie Lee Brown | 30 | 28 | 2 | Male | Black | Florida | Electrocution | |
| 41 | July 10, 1953 | Kenneth Boyd | 23 | 20 | 3 | Male | Black | Missouri | Gas chamber | |
| 42 | July 10, 1953 | Robert Gemmell | 29 | 28 | 1 | Male | White | Ohio | Electrocution | |
| 43 | July 16, 1953 | Donald Hugh Snyder | 25 | 24 | 1 | Male | White | New York | Electrocution | |
| 44 | July 23, 1953 | William H. Draper | 34 | 30 | 4 | Male | White | New York | Electrocution | |
| 45 | August 14, 1953 | Eddie Jackson | 48 | 46 | 2 | Male | Black | Louisiana | Electrocution | |
| 46 | August 24, 1953 | Robert Remer Strickland | 22 | 20 | 2 | Male | White | Georgia | Electrocution | |
| 47 | August 25, 1953 | Lott Glover | 31 | 30 | 1 | Male | Black | Maryland | Hanging | |
| 48 | August 28, 1953 | Reuben Myhand | 20 | 19 | 1 | Male | Black | Alabama | Electrocution | |
| 49 | August 28, 1953 | Samuel Bowens | 23 | Unknown | Unknown | Male | Black | Georgia | Electrocution | |
| 50 | September 4, 1953 | Earle Dennison | 56 | 55 | 1 | Female | White | Alabama | Electrocution | |
| 51 | September 7, 1953 | Ed Brooks | 61 | 60 | 1 | Male | Black | Florida | Electrocution | |
| 52 | October 7, 1953 | Louis Allison | 23 | 20 | 3 | Male | Black | Texas | Electrocution | |
| 53 | October 16, 1953 | Lloyd Gomez | 29 | 26 | 3 | Male | Hispanic | California | Gas chamber | |
| 54 | October 23, 1953 | Johnnie D. Harrison | 51 | 50 | 1 | Male | Black | California | Gas chamber | |
| 55 | October 30, 1953 | John Chauncey Lawrence | 38 | 37 | 1 | Male | White | California | Gas chamber | |
| 56 | November 6, 1953 | Lloyd Ray Daniels | 22 | 17 | 5 | Male | Black | North Carolina | Gas chamber | |
| 57 | November 6, 1953 | Bennie Daniels | 22 | 17 | 5 | Male | Black | North Carolina | Gas chamber | |
| 58 | November 14, 1953 | Willie Burgess | 56 | Unknown | Unknown | Male | Black | Georgia | Electrocution | |
| 59 | November 17, 1953 | Carl Austin DeWolf | 37 | 30 | 7 | Male | White | Oklahoma | Electrocution | |
| 60 | December 18, 1953 | Robert Calhoun | 30 | 29 | 1 | Male | Black | Georgia | Electrocution | |
| 61 | December 18, 1953 | Carl Austin Hall | 34 | 34 | 0 | Male | White | Federal government | Gas chamber | |
| 62 | December 18, 1953 | Bonnie Emily Heady | 41 | 41 | 0 | Female | White | Federal government | Gas chamber | |
| 63 | December 23, 1953 | Isaiah Harris | 33 | 33 | 0 | Male | Black | Georgia | Electrocution | |

== Demographics ==
Gender
| Male | 60 | 95% |
| Female | 3 | 5% |
Ethnicity
| White | 31 | 49% |
| Black | 30 | 48% |
| Hispanic | 2 | 3% |
State
| California | 8 | 13% |
| Georgia | 8 | 13% |
| New York | 5 | 8% |
| North Carolina | 5 | 8% |
| Texas | 5 | 8% |
| Federal government | 4 | 6% |
| Ohio | 4 | 6% |
| Pennsylvania | 4 | 6% |
| Oregon | 3 | 5% |
| Alabama | 2 | 3% |
| Florida | 2 | 3% |
| Louisiana | 2 | 3% |
| Missouri | 2 | 3% |
| Washington | 2 | 3% |
| District of Columbia | 1 | 2% |
| Illinois | 1 | 2% |
| Kentucky | 1 | 2% |
| Maryland | 1 | 2% |
| Nevada | 1 | 2% |
| Oklahoma | 1 | 2% |
| West Virginia | 1 | 2% |
Method
| Electrocution | 39 | 62% |
| Gas chamber | 21 | 33% |
| Hanging | 3 | 5% |
Month
| January | 9 | 14% |
| February | 7 | 11% |
| March | 5 | 8% |
| April | 6 | 10% |
| May | 9 | 14% |
| June | 3 | 5% |
| July | 5 | 8% |
| August | 5 | 8% |
| September | 2 | 3% |
| October | 4 | 6% |
| November | 4 | 6% |
| December | 4 | 6% |
Age
| 10–19 | 1 | 2% |
| 20–29 | 23 | 37% |
| 30–39 | 19 | 30% |
| 40–49 | 9 | 14% |
| 50–59 | 9 | 14% |
| 60–69 | 2 | 3% |
| Total | 63 | 100% |

== Executions in recent years ==
Number of executions
| 1954 | 83 |
| 1953 | 63 |
| 1952 | 81 |
| Total | 227 |

| Preceded by 1952 | List of people executed in the United States in 1953 | Succeeded by 1954 |
