= 1904 Washington gubernatorial election =

- November 8, 1904
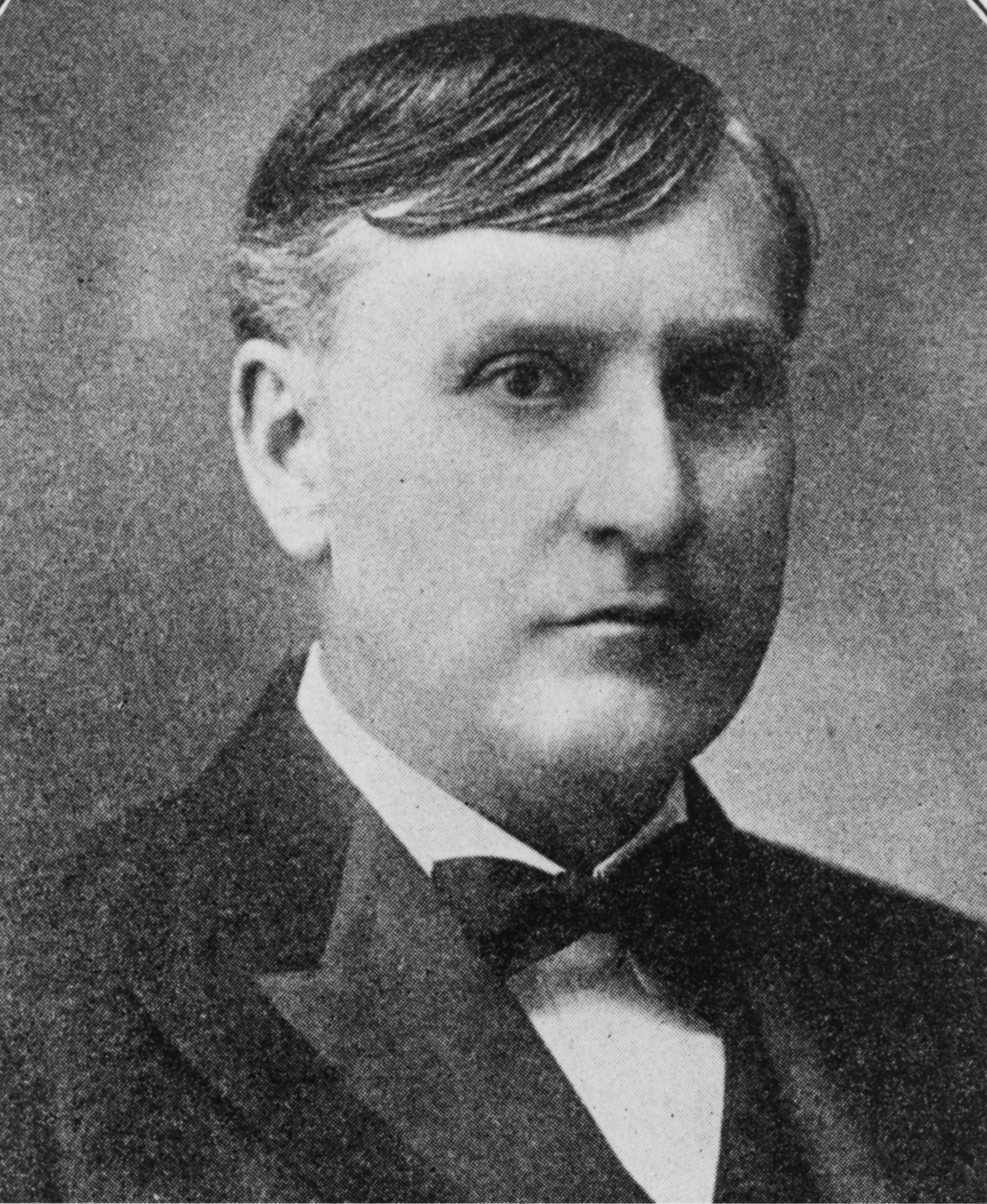

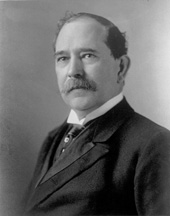

Nominee	Albert E. Mead	George Turner	David Burgess
Party	Republican	Democratic	Socialist
Popular vote	74,278	59,119	7,420
Percentage	51.34%	40.86%	5.13%
- County results Mead: 40–50% 50–60% 60–70% Turner: 50–60% 60–70%
Governor before election
Henry McBride
Republican
Elected Governor
Albert E. Mead
Republican

The 1904 Washington gubernatorial election was held on November 8, 1904.

Republican nominee Albert E. Mead defeated Democratic nominee George Turner and Socialist nominee David Burgess, with 51.34% of the vote.

== General election ==
=== Candidates ===
Major party candidates

- Albert E. Mead, Republican, former member of the Washington House of Representatives
- George Turner, Democratic, former U.S. Senator

Other candidates

- Ambrose H. Sherwood, Prohibition, Prohibition nominee for Washington's at-large congressional district in 1902
- David Burgess, Socialist, Socialist nominee for Washington's at-large congressional district in 1902
- William McCormick, Socialist Labor, Socialist Labor nominee for Governor in 1900 and for Washington's at-large congressional district in 1902

=== Results ===
1904 Washington gubernatorial election
Party	Candidate	Votes	%	±%
Republican	Albert E. Mead	74,278	51.34%	+4.54%
Democratic	George Turner	59,119	40.87%	−8.00%
Socialist	David Burgess	7,420	5.13%	+3.56%
Prohibition	Ambrose H. Sherwood	2,782	1.92%	−0.05%
Socialist Labor	William McCormick	1,070	0.74%	−0.05%
Majority		15,159	10.48%	
Total votes		144,669	100.00%	
Republican hold		Swing	+12.53%	

=== Results by county ===
County	Albert E. Mead Republican		George Turner Democratic		David Burgess Socialist		Ambrose H. Sherwood Prohibition		William McCormick Socialist Labor		Margin		Total votes cast
County	#	%	#	%	#	%	#	%	#	%	#	%	Total votes cast
Adams	660	37.29%	1,049	59.27%	34	1.92%	21	1.19%	6	0.34%	-389	-21.98%	1,770
Asotin	528	50.87%	469	45.18%	24	2.31%	14	1.35%	3	0.29%	59	5.68%	1,038
Chehalis	2,188	57.78%	1,120	29.57%	392	10.35%	57	1.51%	30	0.79%	1,068	28.20%	3,787
Chelan	922	50.16%	864	47.01%	27	1.47%	18	0.98%	7	0.38%	58	3.16%	1,838
Clallam	754	57.47%	451	34.38%	97	7.39%	1	0.08%	9	0.69%	303	23.09%	1,312
Clark	1,891	56.48%	1,147	34.26%	174	5.20%	123	3.67%	13	0.39%	744	22.22%	3,348
Columbia	718	43.49%	886	53.66%	18	1.09%	25	1.51%	4	0.24%	-168	-10.18%	1,651
Cowlitz	1,313	63.74%	637	30.92%	72	3.50%	32	1.55%	6	0.29%	676	32.82%	2,060
Douglas	986	41.13%	1.357	56.61%	33	1.38%	17	0.71%	4	0.17%	-371	-15.48%	2,397
Ferry	312	33.44%	560	60.02%	53	5.68%	4	0.43%	4	0.43%	-248	-26.58%	933
Franklin	314	37.83%	488	58.80%	15	1.81%	7	0.84%	6	0.72%	-174	-20.96%	830
Garfield	457	41.17%	623	56.13%	18	1.62%	10	0.90%	2	0.18%	-166	-14.95%	1,110
Island	384	65.53%	134	22.87%	53	9.04%	13	2.22%	2	0.34%	250	42.66%	586
Jefferson	870	66.51%	387	29.59%	32	2.45%	7	0.54%	12	0.92%	483	36.93%	1,308
King	16,719	58.08%	9,523	33.08%	1,629	5.66%	560	1.95%	355	1.23%	7,196	25.00%	28,786
Kitsap	1,475	59.24%	671	26.95%	258	10.36%	62	2.49%	24	0.96%	804	32.29%	2,490
Kittitas	1,277	46.44%	1,173	42.65%	213	7.75%	66	2.40%	21	0.76%	104	3.78%	2,750
Klickitat	1,154	59.61%	622	32.13%	110	5.68%	45	2.32%	5	0.26%	532	27.48%	1,936
Lewis	2,504	56.84%	1,588	36.05%	194	4.40%	105	2.38%	14	0.32%	916	20.79%	4,405
Lincoln	1,408	38.47%	2,135	58.33%	78	2.13%	36	0.98%	3	0.08%	-727	-19.86%	3,660
Mason	550	52.78%	452	43.38%	16	1.54%	14	1.34%	10	0.96%	98	9.40%	1,042
Okanogan	769	42.98%	930	51.98%	72	4.02%	4	0.22%	14	0.78%	-161	-9.00%	1,789
Pacific	1,025	58.37%	632	35.99%	81	4.61%	14	0.80%	4	0.23%	393	22.38%	1,756
Pierce	7,162	52.12%	5,443	39.61%	696	5.06%	269	1.96%	172	1.25%	1,719	12.51%	13,742
San Juan	521	68.10%	157	20.52%	59	7.71%	21	2.75%	7	0.92%	364	47.58%	765
Skagit	2,647	61.08%	1,377	31.77%	225	5.19%	62	1.43%	23	0.53%	1,270	29.30%	4,334
Skamania	233	54.57%	120	28.10%	68	15.93%	4	0.94%	2	0.47%	113	26.46%	427
Snohomish	4,622	55.56%	2,930	35.22%	435	5.23%	269	3.23%	63	0.76%	1,692	20.34%	8,319
Spokane	5,158	35.96%	8,135	56.72%	660	4.60%	312	2.18%	78	0.54%	-2,977	-20.76%	14,343
Stevens	1,288	34.56%	2,103	56.43%	279	7.49%	29	0.78%	28	0.75%	-815	-21.87%	3,727
Thurston	1,493	48.51%	1,365	44.35%	166	5.39%	43	1.40%	11	0.36%	128	4.16%	3,078
Wahkiakum	442	69.06%	133	20.78%	57	8.91%	6	0.94%	2	0.31%	309	48.28%	640
Walla Walla	1,883	47.97%	1,976	50.34%	27	0.69%	25	0.64%	14	0.36%	-93	-2.37%	3,925
Whatcom	4,947	64.22%	1,916	24.87%	540	7.01%	221	2.87%	79	1.03%	3,031	39.35%	7,703
Whitman	2,115	34.55%	3,614	59.04%	229	3.74%	151	2.47%	12	0.20%	-1,499	-24.49%	6,121
Yakima	2,589	52.16%	1,952	39.32%	287	5.78%	115	2.32%	21	0.42%	637	12.83%	4,964
Totals	74,278	51.34%	59,119	40.86%	7,420 (Note: The county figures add up to 7,421)	5.13%	2,782	1.92%	1,070	0.74%	15,159	10.48%	144,669

==== Counties that flipped from Democratic to Republican ====
- Asotin
- Chelan
- King
- Kittitas
- Pierce
- Skamania
- Snohomish

==== Counties that flipped from Republican to Democratic ====
- Columbia
- Walla Walla

== Bibliography ==
- Glashan, Roy R. (1979). American Governors and Gubernatorial Elections, 1775-1978. Meckler Books. ISBN 0-930466-17-9.
- Gubernatorial Elections, 1787-1997. Washington, D.C.: Congressional Quarterly Inc. 1998. ISBN 1-56802-396-0.
