= List of people executed in the United States in 1900 =

Ninety-nine people, all male, were executed in the United States in 1900, ninety-five by hanging, and four by electrocution.

== List of people executed in the United States in 1900 ==
No.	Date of execution	Name	Age	Gender	Ethnicity	State	Method	Ref.								
No.	Date of execution	Name	Age	Gender	Ethnicity	State	Method	Ref.	1	January 3, 1900	Edward Cressinger	19	Male	White	Pennsylvania	Hanging
2	January 5, 1900	Go See	47	Asian	California								Male			Hanging
3	January 5, 1900	Charley Wilson	—	Black	South Carolina								Male			Hanging
4	January 5, 1900	Zachariah Singleton	—	Black	South Carolina								Male			Hanging
5	January 6, 1900	Antonio Flores	—	Hispanic	Texas								Male			Hanging
6	January 6, 1900	Geronimo Para	—	Hispanic	Texas								Male			Hanging
7	January 8, 1900	George Smiley	—	White	Arizona								Male			Hanging
8	January 9, 1900	James Eagen	—	White	Pennsylvania								Male			Hanging
9	January 9, 1900	Cornelius Shew	—	White	Pennsylvania								Male			Hanging
10	January 9, 1900	William Wasco	34	White	Pennsylvania								Male			Hanging
11	January 11, 1900	Robert W. Brown	—	Black	Pennsylvania								Male			Hanging
12	January 12, 1900	Charley Wilson	—	Black	Georgia								Male			Hanging
13	January 12, 1900	Ellis Misebel	—	Black	Texas								Male			Hanging
14	January 16, 1900	William Patterson	—	Black	Pennsylvania								Male			Hanging
15	January 19, 1900	Philip Denson	—	Black	Georgia								Male			Hanging
16	January 24, 1900	Samuel Peter Meyers	—	White	Pennsylvania								Male			Hanging
17	February 2, 1900	William G. Magers	26	White	Oregon								Male			Hanging
18	February 8, 1900	William Truesdale	—	Black	North Carolina								Male			Hanging
19	February 8, 1900	George St. Clair	—	Black	Pennsylvania								Male			Hanging
20	February 9, 1900	Will Golson	28	Black	Alabama								Male			Hanging
21	February 9, 1900	Sam Wright	—	Black	Louisiana								Male			Hanging
22	February 9, 1900	James K. Brown	—	Black	New Jersey								Male			Hanging
23	February 10, 1900	Reuben Ross	—	Black	North Carolina								Male			Hanging
24	February 15, 1900	George Weeks	—	Black	Pennsylvania								Male			Hanging
25	February 15, 1900	Thomas Brennen	—	White	Pennsylvania								Male			Hanging
26	February 23, 1900	Handy Davis	—	Black	Louisiana								Male			Hanging
27	February 26, 1900	Antonio Ferraro	37	White	New York	Electrocution							Male			
28	March 2, 1900	Will Leonard	—	Black	Georgia	Hanging							Male			
29	March 2, 1900	Charles Brown	—	Black	Louisiana	Hanging							Male			
30	March 2, 1900	John Green	—	Black	Louisiana	Hanging							Male			
31	March 9, 1900	Wayman King	38	Black	Florida	Hanging							Male			
32	March 9, 1900	Thomas Nathaniel	—	Black	Louisiana	Hanging							Male			
33	March 9, 1900	Edward Williams	—	Black	New Jersey	Hanging							Male			
34	March 9, 1900	Willie Jones	28	Black	Texas	Hanging							Male			
35	March 15, 1900	John Taylor	—	Black	North Carolina	Hanging							Male			
36	March 15, 1900	Robert Fortune	—	Black	North Carolina	Hanging							Male			
37	March 16, 1900	King Martin	—	Black	Texas	Hanging							Male			
38	March 18, 1900	William Wallace Calder	25	White	Montana	Hanging							Male			
39	March 23, 1900	Nevison Morris	30	Black	Texas	Hanging							Male			
40	March 23, 1900	Frank White	—	Black	Texas	Hanging							Male			
41	March 29, 1900	Joseph C. Hurst	—	White	Montana	Hanging							Male			
42	March 30, 1900	George Webster	28	White	Washington	Hanging							Male			
43	April 2, 1900	Allen Fuller	—	Black	Georgia	Hanging							Male			
44	April 6, 1900	King Goosby	16	Black	Georgia	Hanging							Male			
45	April 6, 1900	Lewis Goosby	14	Black	Georgia	Hanging							Male			
46	April 6, 1900	William Pepo	48	White	Montana	Hanging							Male			
47	April 6, 1900	Albert Michaud	—	White	Washington	Hanging							Male			
48	April 16, 1900	Bob McKinney	—	Black	Texas	Hanging							Male			
49	April 20, 1900	Homer Crawford	—	Black	Georgia	Hanging							Male			
50	April 23, 1900	Joaquin Eslabe	29	Native American	California	Hanging							Male			
51	April 25, 1900	Bill Brown	—	White	Tennessee	Hanging							Male			
52	April 25, 1900	Sonny Crain	40	Black	Tennessee	Hanging							Male			
53	April 25, 1900	John C. Watson	58	White	Tennessee	Hanging							Male			
54	May 7, 1900	James Nettles	—	Black	Missouri	Hanging							Male			
55	May 7, 1900	Henry Brown	18	Black	Texas	Hanging							Male			
56	May 8, 1900	Edward Clifford	—	Unknown	New Jersey	Hanging							Male			
57	May 18, 1900	Walter Gordon	—	Black	Alabama	Hanging							Male			
58	May 18, 1900	Beauty Ingram	18	Black	Alabama	Hanging							Male			
59	May 18, 1900	Elbert Curry	—	Black	Alabama	Hanging							Male			
60	May 21, 1900	Fritz Meyer	46	White	New York	Electrocution							Male			
61	May 23, 1900	Frank Krause	—	White	Pennsylvania	Hanging							Male			
62	June 1, 1900	Jose P. Ruiz	—	Hispanic	New Mexico	Hanging							Male			
63	June 5, 1900	William Hummel	—	White	Pennsylvania	Hanging							Male			
64	June 15, 1900	Ernest B. Clevenger	—	Unknown	Missouri	Hanging							Male			
65	June 18, 1900	Sid Spears	—	Black	Texas	Hanging							Male			
66	June 29, 1900	Thomas W. Flannelly	31	White	California	Hanging							Male			
67	June 29, 1900	Benjamin Hill Snell	42	White	Washington D.C	Hanging							Male			
68	July 6, 1900	Nelson Vale	59	Black	Washington D.C	Hanging							Male			
69	July 20, 1900	Charles B. Cross	18	White	Connecticut	Hanging							Male			
70	July 23, 1900	Joseph Mullen	23	White	New York	Electrocution							Male			
71	July 27, 1900	John Renfro	—	White	Texas	Hanging							Male			
72	August 3, 1900	Amos B. Smith	—	Black	Maryland	Hanging							Male			
73	August 17, 1900	Dillard Herndon	—	Unknown	Georgia	Hanging							Male			
74	August 28, 1900	Hiram Sharp	51	White	Georgia	Hanging							Male			
75	August 31, 1900	William Black	—	Black	Maryland	Hanging							Male			
76	August 31, 1900	Thomas Jones	—	Black	North Carolina	Hanging							Male			
77	September 1, 1900	Sam Robinson	22	Black	Georgia	Hanging							Male			
78	September 14, 1900	Daniel Lucey	42	White	Montana	Hanging							Male			
79	September 14, 1900	Ira O. Jenkins	—	Unknown	North Dakota	Hanging							Male			
80	September 14, 1900	Hans Thorp	—	White	North Dakota	Hanging							Male			
81	September 19, 1900	Henderson House	—	Black	Tennessee	Hanging							Male			
82	September 27, 1900	Dillard Warren	—	White	Tennessee	Hanging							Male			
83	September 28, 1900	Archie Kinsauls	35	White	North Carolina	Hanging							Male			
84	October 5, 1900	Coleman Gillespie	20	White	Oregon	Hanging							Male			
85	October 26, 1900	Warby Wine	—	Black	South Carolina	Hanging							Male			
86	October 29, 1900	William Branch	—	Black	Georgia	Hanging							Male			
87	November 9, 1900	Frank Funk	25	White	Washington, D.C.	Hanging							Male			
88	November 9, 1900	Richard Gardner	25	Black	Ohio	Electrocution							Male			
89	November 15, 1900	Isaac Birriola	55	White	Pennsylvania	Hanging							Male			
90	November 16, 1900	William Halderman	24	White	Arizona	Hanging							Male			
91	November 16, 1900	Thomas Halderman	22	White	Arizona	Hanging							Male			
92	November 16, 1900	Santiago Ortiz	23	Hispanic	Arizona	Hanging							Male			
93	November 16, 1900	William Sullivan	40	White	California	Hanging							Male			
94	November 19, 1900	George Puttman	25	White	California	Hanging							Male			
95	November 22, 1900	William Simms	—	Unknown	Pennsylvania	Hanging							Male			
96	December 13, 1900	William Woodson	—	Black	Virginia	Hanging							Male			
97	December 21, 1900	John Owens	—	White	Illinois	Hanging							Male			
98	December 21, 1900	John Holden	—	Black	Virginia	Hanging							Male			
99	December 28, 1900	Sylvester Griffin	—	Black	Virginia	Hanging							Male			

== Demographics ==
Gender
Male	99	100%
Female	0	0%
Ethnicity
Unknown	5	5%
Black	51	52%
White	37	37%
Hispanic	4	4%
Asian	1	1%
Native American	1	1%
State
Pennsylvania	14	14%
Georgia	11	11%
Texas	11	11%
North Carolina	6	6%
California	5	5%
Louisiana	5	5%
Tennessee	5	5%
Alabama	4	4%
Arizona	4	4%
Montana	4	4%
District of Columbia	3	3%
New Jersey	3	3%
New York	3	3%
South Carolina	3	3%
Virginia	3	3%
Maryland	2	2%
Missouri	2	2%
North Dakota	2	2%
Oregon	2	2%
Washington	2	2%
Connecticut	1	1%
Florida	1	1%
Illinois	1	1%
New Mexico	1	1%
Ohio	1	1%
Method
Hanging	95	96%
Electrocution	4	4%
Month
January	16	16%
February	11	11%
March	15	15%
April	11	11%
May	8	8%
June	6	6%
July	4	4%
August	5	5%
September	7	7%
October	3	3%
November	9	9%
December	4	4%
Age
Unknown	61	62%
14–19	6	6%
20–29	15	15%
30–39	6	6%
40–49	7	7%
50–59	4	4%
Total	99	100%

== Executions in recent years ==
Number of executions
1899	129
1900	99
1901	113
Total	341

== See also ==
- Lists of people executed in the United States

Preceded by 1899	List of people executed in the United States in 1900	Succeeded by 1901
