= Lum You =

Chinese laborer and convicted murderer

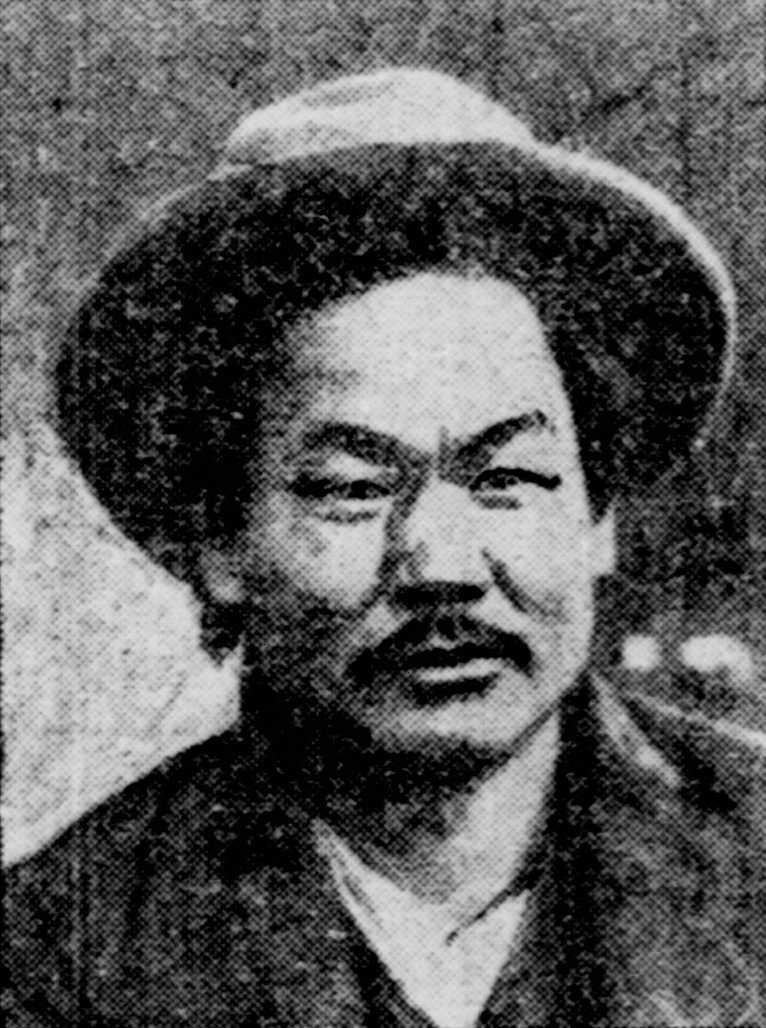
- Lum You
- Born: c. 1861; China
- Died: January 31, 1902 (aged 40 or 41); South Bend, Washington, U.S.
- Resting place: Pacific County, Washington
- Occupation: Cannery worker
- Status: Executed by hanging
- Convictions: First degree murder Assault
- Penalty: Death

Lum You (c. 1861 – January 31, 1902)—sometimes spelled Lum Yu—was an immigrant Chinese laborer and convicted murderer in the Pacific Northwest. He is famous for being the only person to have been legally executed in Pacific County, Washington, and for his death row prison break supposedly arranged by the very jailers charged with his captivity.

== Biography ==
Lum You was among the many Chinese laborers who came to the United States near the turn of the century. A proud, sociable dandy, Lum was well-liked in the White community. In 1894, he arrived in Pacific County, Washington, and although he spoke a little English, Lum quickly became a popular figure, acting as an agent between the Chinese workers and their employers in Bay Center.

On June 28, 1894, Lum approached South Bend police chief Marion Egbert regarding a dispute he had with Joe Ging, a fellow Chinese laborer. According to Lum, there had been an argument between the two at Ging's residence in Bruceport, after Ging had sold a gun for Lum, who was unhappy with the meager sales price of $1,50 (equivalent to $56 in 2025). Although Lum did not specify what had occurred, he wanted to press assault charges against Ging. Egbert told Lum that he did not want to deal with "Chinaman troubles" and dissuaded Lum by saying that he would have to pay the courts for the legal process. Egbert instead suggested Lum resolve the matter himself, stating "I don’t care what you do. You can chop off his head if you want to!". Lum subsequently returned to Bruceport in the late hours, where he sought out Ging at his cabin and struck the sleeping man in the face with an ax. Ging's roommate, Lee Ging, disarmed Lum, who tried to flee the cabin, but he was caught by the other two house mates, Dave Hill and Doc Riddell, who had overheard Ging's screaming. Ging survived after being treated for a three-inch gash above the left eye and having a portion of crushed bone removed from his skull.

Lum was held in jail for one charge of assault with intent to kill. During the trial, Lum admitted to the attack, but pleaded not guilty, with his defense maintaining that the assault was only committed because Lum had been denied legal relief by police. Character witnesses similarly maintained that Lum was "peaceable unless pushed beyond endurance". He was convicted and sentenced to a prison term of six months as well as a fine of $500 (equivalent to $18,606 in 2025). After his release, Lum continued his work in Bay Center, working on cranberry bogs and oyster farms.

=== Murder of Oscar Bloom ===
In the summer of 1901, Lum was employed as a cannery worker in Bay Center. On August 6 of that year, Lum was assaulted and robbed by Oscar Bloom, a White man with a reputation as a bully. Following a minor scuffle after the two men had bumped into each other on the street, Lum and Bloom played a game of cards in the evening. During the game, Bloom attacked Lum and stole Lum's watch and $40.75 (equivalent to $1,577 in 2025) in gold and silver coins before grabbing Lum by the neck and threatening him with death.

This time, Lum did not approach the police. After he and Bloom left for their respective homes, Lum retrieved a pistol and headed for Bloom's apartment. Lum reached Bloom as he was in the process of unlocking the front door, following Bloom inside and shooting him in the abdomen. Lum fled the scene while Bloom managed to step into his room and collapse into bed. Lum had warned a boy, who lived near Bloom's home, of the shooting and advised him to go back inside and although neighbors overheard the gunshot, no one alerted police. Bloom's absence at work was noted the following day and by the time local authorities found Bloom, 23 hours had passed. Bloom survived long enough to swear a deathbed affidavit identifying Lum as his killer. Lum was arrested the same day on August 7.

=== Trial, death row and escape attempt ===
Public sympathy for Lum was high, but White employers of the Chinese workers pressed officials for action to be taken against him. Lum's trial began on October 8, 1901, which ended with a conviction for first-degree murder, with the jury having voted 11–1 for acquittal. Contrary to the jurors' belief that Lum would receive a light sentence, the judge ordered that Lum be hanged. The execution was scheduled for January 31, 1902.

Even after his conviction, Lum continued to enjoy public support. Petitions for clemency, one of which was signed by one of the jurors, were sent to the state governor. County officials sympathized with Lum, supposedly leaving his cell door unlocked at night and encouraging him to escape. Lum eventually did escape, early in the morning of January 14: one news report claimed the improvised lock to his cell door had been picked with the aid of a confederate. Lum hid in the environs of South Bend for several days, during which he was hunted by a squad led by sheriff Thomas A. Roney. On January 15, he was sighted by two men; the following day the county commissioners met and agreed to offer a reward of $200 for Lum's capture. On January 17, Lum was finally apprehended by a three-man posse. Lum offered no resistance, and when asked how he escaped, said only that the door was open and he walked out.

=== Execution ===
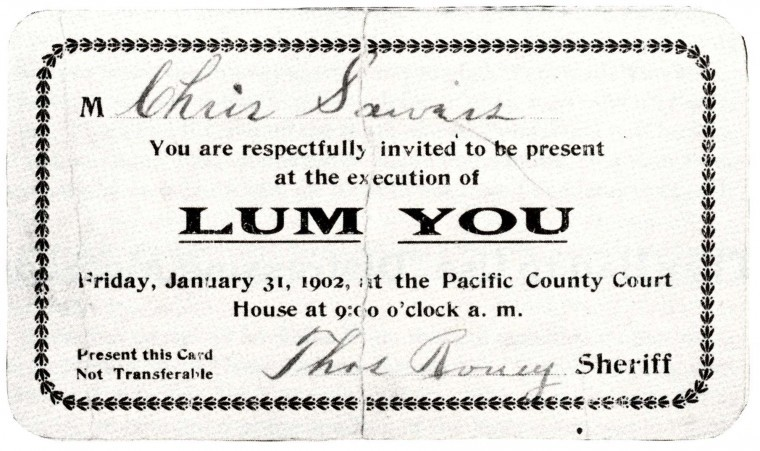
Invitation to Lum You's execution

On January 27, Governor Henry McBride rejected one of the petitions for clemency on procedural grounds, and on January 30 confirmed by wire that he would not be commuting Lum's sentence. Anticipation of the execution became so great that Roney was besieged with requests to attend. Roney issued 500 invitation cards, some examples of which survive.

Lum's hanging proceeded as planned inside the courthouse of the county seat, South Bend, on the morning of January 31, 1902. Though it had been expected that he would break down, Lum ate fairly well that morning and went to the gallows without assistance. He bade his friends goodbye and then uttered his last words to his executioners: "Kill me good." The trap was sprung by means of a rope which, along with three dummy ropes, extended into an adjoining room. Each of the four executioners concealed in that room pulled his rope simultaneously, but only the sheriff knew which was the trigger.

Lum's was the first and only official execution ever to take place in Pacific County. A month after his arrest, a new act of the Washington State Legislature took effect which required executions for any future crimes to be carried out at the Washington State Penitentiary in Walla Walla.

== Legacy ==
Lum's grave is located along a road between South Bend and Raymond, next to the property of a deputy sheriff, Zack Brown, who had offered to bury Lum. Over the decades, local Chinese residents would frequently visit the grave and leave food at the site, which was then taken and eaten by Brown's son. A neighbor, Don Corcoran, stated that Lum's grave was dug up and desecrated by local teenagers at some point. In 2019, AmeriCorps stated that they were interested in building a memorial at Lum's grave, as they believed that he was given an unfair trial and penalty due to anti-Chinese sentiments at the time.

Lum You's trial and execution attracted a great deal of contemporary publicity in Pacific County, and has since passed into the realm of folk legend. His story has been researched and recounted by local historians Ruth Dixon, Willard R. Espy, and Sydney Stevens. Espy, also a nationally renowned poet, memorialized Lum in a humorous epitaph. Lum was also the subject of a biographical play performed in the early 1980s, The Hanging of Lum You by the Oysterville-based Shoalwater Storytellers.

== See also ==
- Capital punishment in Washington (state)
- List of people executed in Washington (pre-1972)
