= Harvey Collins =

American serial killer (1925–1957)

- Collins c. 1957
- Born: Harvey John Collins; October 5, 1925; Portland, Oregon, U.S.
- Died: December 3, 1957 (aged 32); Washington State Penitentiary, Walla Walla, Washington, U.S.
- Status: Executed by hanging
- Conviction: First degree murder
- Penalty: Death

Details
- Victims: 3
- Span of crimes: 1953–1955
- Country: United States
- States: Kentucky, Washington
- Date apprehended: March 21, 1955

Harvey John Collins (October 5, 1925 – December 3, 1957) was an American serial killer who was responsible for three murders committed in Kentucky and Washington between 1953 and 1955, one of them committed while he was serving in the United States Army. Convicted and sentenced to death for one of the murders, he was subsequently executed in 1957.

== Early life and first murder ==
Harvey John Collins was born on October 5, 1925, in Portland, Oregon, one of several children born to Alfred and Mable Collins (née Tessier). Early on in his life, the entire family moved to Spokane, Washington, where Collins would grow up. According to one of his sisters, they all grew up in a stable, loving home, in which Collins was considered a mama's boy who got along with everyone. When he became an adult, he enlisted in the Marine Corps, where he served with distinction in the Pacific Theatre and fought during the Battle of Iwo Jima, from which he brought home a katana taken from a Japanese soldier he had killed in battle. For his fighting merits, he was promoted to the rank of Captain, and was generally regarded as an upstanding member of society.

However, after the war ended, Collins began to exhibit signs of psychological distress, possibly brought on either from PTSD or from the death of his father in a workplace accident years prior. In 1953, he was transferred to Fort Knox, Kentucky as part of his Army artillery training. On May 15, 1953, he was dining at a roadhouse where he got into a fight with the escort for one of the waitresses, a 37-year-old divorcee named Edna Iona Hall, of nearby Vine Grove. In what appeared to be a friendly gesture, Collins offered to drive her home, but while driving back to Fort Knox, Collins stopped the car on an isolated road and attempted to make sexual advances towards Hall. She rejected him outright, causing the enraged Collins to kick her out of the car, then beat and finally stab her in the head with a screwdriver.

After doing this, Collins picked up the still-breathing woman and put her in the back of his car, even flagging down a passing automobile to help him move his vehicle, as it was stuck in the sand. Once the car was freed, Collins drove further along the road, where he dragged Hall off to the nearby woodlands and buried her alive in a foxhole, covering the burial site with dirt and sheet metal. He then returned to his quarters at Fort Knox, where he subsequently burned his clothes in the furnace. Some time later, he was questioned by FBI agents in regard to Hall's disappearance, but was cleared when several of her friends claimed that they had supposedly seen her alive on that particular night. Thusly, Collins was let go, and even after Hall's body was discovered eight months later, her murder would remain unsolved for the time being.

== Attempted suicide, discharge and move to Washington ==
As part of his tactics aviation course, Collins was transferred to Fort Sill, Oklahoma, with his family residing in nearby Walters. On January 6, 1954, he left behind a suicide letter and then went to the base's air field, where he stole a Cessna O-1 Bird Dog and lifted off. For the next few hours, he flew aimlessly around the area until he eventually crashed the plane near some train tracks in Temple. While the wreckage was quickly located by other officers, there was no immediate sign of Collins himself.

Two days later, he surrendered himself at a police station in Dallas, Texas, and shortly after was detained at the Carswell Air Force Base. An investigation revealed that Collins had been picked up and driven to Wichita Falls by a Walters resident who was told by Collins that he intended to travel to Galveston. After a medical examination concluded that he was sane and unharmed, Collins was transferred back to Fort Sill. When questioned about the incident, he stated that he had initially wanted to commit suicide, but claimed that he had no idea what happened after the crash. As a result of this incident, he was dishonorably discharged and moved in with some relatives in Puyallup, Washington, who employed him at their dairy shop.

On February 7, while at a filling station in Federal Way, Collins shot and killed 25-year-old attendant Edward Morley in an apparent hold-up, using a Japanese pistol he had taken as a trophy. On March 21, he went to a motel in Milton and asked the proprietress, 67-year-old Anna Stolen, how much it would cost to stay overnight. After she told him it was $4, Collins told her it was too much and left. Some time later, he came back and knocked on the door, only to attack Stolen with a paring knife when she opened it. When she attempted to flee, Collins pulled out the katana he was carrying on his back and attacked her, severing one of her fingers. Her screams awoke her 74-year-old disabled husband, Andrew, who attempted to help her, only to be slashed to death. After killing Andrew, Collins went after Anna with his car, attempting to run her over. She managed to dodge his attack, causing him to turn towards the highway and flee. After the sheriffs arrived, Mrs. Stolen gave a general description of her assailant and the last two digits of his car's license plate, which eventually led to Collins' arrest about an hour later. An inspection of his car uncovered the murder weapon and bloodied clothing, the stains of which were later linked to the crime scene.

== Trial, imprisonment and execution ==
Shortly after his arrest, Collins admitted to killing Morley and attacking the Stolens, but claimed that he was not responsible for the Hall murder two years prior, pointing out that he had been cleared in that crime before. Per procedure, he was ordered to undergo a mental evaluation at a nearby psychiatric hospital to determine whether he was insane at the time of the crimes. Later that same day, after he was determined to be sane and was interrogated by FBI agents, Collins confessed to the Hall murder, explaining it in details that only the killer could have known.

In response to the confessions, the prosecutor in charge of the Kentucky case said that he would not bring charges against Collins, so long as his colleagues in Washington sought a death sentence against him. Washington State prosecutor John O'Connell said he would indeed pursue it, with the trial date set for June 27, 1955. To strengthen their case, he brought on two psychiatrists, Drs. Myron Kass and Harlan P. McNutt, who had previously examined Collins and determined that he was sane at the time of the killings. In response, defense attorneys Andrew L. Garnes and J. Houston Vanzant Jr. decided to bar their client from taking the stand at his trial. Despite their best efforts, Collins was found guilty of the Stolen murder and sentenced to death.

On September 18, Collins and six other inmates escaped from jail and went on the run, with Collins finding temporary refuge in the home of his childhood friend Dean Pitsch, who had testified in his defence at the trial. Two days later, however, he surrendered himself at the sheriff's office, claiming that he had "thought the situation through" and had decided to embrace his fate. Despite his wishes, his attorneys continued to appeal his sentence, only for it to be denied by the Supreme Court two years later. As a result, Collins' execution date was set for December 3, 1957. On the aforementioned date, Collins was hanged at the Washington State Penitentiary in Walla Walla. He was hanged at 12:05 a.m. before being officially pronounced dead 12 minutes later. He was executed in front of a crowd of 30 people. His final words were: "I ask forgiveness for everything I've done." His body was claimed by relatives on December 4, 1957. Per his last wish, his body was donated to the University of Washington medical school for research.

== See also ==
- Capital punishment in Washington (state)
- List of people executed in Washington (pre-1972)
- List of people executed in the United States in 1957
- List of serial killers in the United States
