= List of people executed in the United States in 1901 =

One hundred and thirteen people, all male, were executed in the United States in 1901, one hundred and two by hanging, and eleven by electrocution. One notable execution, Leon Czolgosz, was an American anarchist responsible for the assassination of President William McKinley in September 1901. Czolgosz was executed for this crime one month later.

== List of people executed in the United States in 1901 ==
No.	Date of execution	Name	Age	Gender	Ethnicity	State	Method	Ref.
1	January 4, 1901	James Kelley	Unknown	Male	Black	South Carolina	Hanging	
2	January 5, 1901	Ben Perry	Unknown	Male	Black	Louisiana	Hanging	
3	January 5, 1901	Gus Smith	Unknown	Male	Black	Louisiana	Hanging	
4	January 5, 1901	William McCullough	Unknown	Male	White	Mississippi	Hanging	
5	January 5, 1901	Will Kirby	Unknown	Male	Black	Mississippi	Hanging	
6	January 9, 1901	James Jones	Unknown	Male	Black	Pennsylvania	Hanging	
7	January 9, 1901	George Ward	Unknown	Male	Black	Pennsylvania	Hanging	
8	January 10, 1901	Will Hines	Unknown	Male	Black	Georgia	Hanging	
9	January 10, 1901	John Sadler	Unknown	Male	White	Pennsylvania	Hanging	
10	January 11, 1901	Hardy Westbrook	Unknown	Male	Black	Arkansas	Hanging	
11	January 14, 1901	William Neufeld	27	Male	White	New York	Electrocution	
12	January 25, 1901	Arthur Pierre	Unknown	Male	Black	Louisiana	Hanging	
13	January 25, 1901	Archie Hunt	Unknown	Male	Black	Virginia	Hanging	
14	January 25, 1901	Martin Stickles	30	Male	White	Washington	Hanging	
15	February 1, 1901	John Ruffin	Unknown	Male	Unknown	North Carolina	Hanging	
16	February 5, 1901	Robert Hill	28	Male	White	New Jersey	Hanging	
17	February 6, 1901	Lorenzo Priori	27	Male	White	New York	Electrocution	
18	February 15, 1901	George Thomas	Unknown	Male	Black	South Carolina	Hanging	
19	February 19, 1901	J. H. Tettaton	Unknown	Male	White	Missouri	Hanging	
20	March 1, 1901	Charles Rosslyn H. Ferrell	22	Male	White	Ohio	Electrocution	
21	March 8, 1901	Kirby Graves	Unknown	Male	Black	Arkansas	Hanging	
22	March 8, 1901	Bill Johnson	Unknown	Male	Black	Arkansas	Hanging	
23	March 8, 1901	Henry Brooks	Unknown	Male	Black	Arkansas	Hanging	
24	March 8, 1901	Stanley Gordon	Unknown	Male	Black	Louisiana	Hanging	
25	March 8, 1901	William Payne	35	Male	Black	Louisiana	Hanging	
26	March 8, 1901	Nathan Simpson	Unknown	Male	Black	Louisiana	Hanging	
27	March 14, 1901	Augustus Davis	Unknown	Male	Black	Texas	Hanging	
28	March 23, 1901	John Wesley	Unknown	Male	Black	Arkansas	Hanging	
29	March 29, 1901	Franz Theodore Wallert	Unknown	Male	White	Minnesota	Hanging	
30	April 12, 1901	Joe Thomas	Unknown	Male	Black	Louisiana	Hanging	
31	April 12, 1901	Ellsworth Evans	Unknown	Male	Black	Missouri	Hanging	
32	April 16, 1901	Daniel J. Kehoe	30	Male	White	Pennsylvania	Hanging	
33	April 19, 1901	Charles H. Overs	28	Male	Black	Maryland	Hanging	
34	April 24, 1901	Jacob Johnson	Unknown	Male	Black	Mississippi	Hanging	
36	April 25, 1901	Mark Thomas Hays	Unknown	Male	White	Pennsylvania	Hanging	
37	April 26, 1901	Thomas Cole	Unknown	Male	Unknown	Kentucky	Hanging	
38	April 26, 1901	Toribio Huerta	Unknown	Male	Hispanic	New Mexico	Hanging	
38	April 26, 1901	Thomas Ketchum	37	Male	White	New Mexico	Hanging	
39	May 10, 1901	E. V. Methever	57	Male	White	California	Hanging	
40	May 16, 1901	Vincent Keith	Unknown	Male	Black	Alabama	Hanging	
41	May 31, 1901	Wiley Kirk	18	Male	Black	Maryland	Hanging	
42	May 31, 1901	O. H. Haverson	Unknown	Male	White	Mississippi	Hanging	
43	June 14, 1901	Arnold Augustus	Unknown	Male	Black	Georgia	Hanging	
44	June 14, 1901	Andrew Davis	Unknown	Male	Black	Georgia	Hanging	
45	June 14, 1901	Richard Saunders	Unknown	Male	Black	Georgia	Hanging	
46	June 14, 1901	William Hudson	Unknown	Male	Black	Georgia	Hanging	
47	June 14, 1901	Sam Baldwin	Unknown	Male	Black	Georgia	Hanging	
48	June 14, 1901	Tricey Griffin	18	Male	Black	Georgia	Hanging	
49	June 28, 1901	Alonzo Williams	Unknown	Male	Black	Alabama	Hanging	
50	June 28, 1901	Frank Miller	44	Male	White	Alabama	Hanging	
51	June 28, 1901	Edward Ruthven	30	Male	White	Ohio	Electrocution	
52	July 5, 1901	John Simmons	Unknown	Male	Black	Florida	Hanging	
53	July 5, 1901	Belton Hamilton	Unknown	Male	Black	Florida	Hanging	
54	July 5, 1901	Jim Harrison	Unknown	Male	Black	Florida	Hanging	
55	July 5, 1901	William Williams	Unknown	Male	Black	Florida	Hanging	
56	July 5, 1901	James Faison	Unknown	Male	Black	Florida	Hanging	
57	July 5, 1901	Jose Sanchez	Unknown	Male	Hispanic	New Mexico	Hanging	
58	July 12, 1901	Edward Payne	Unknown	Male	Black	Virginia	Hanging	
59	July 16, 1901	Frank Wennerholm	28	Male	White	New York	Electrocution	
60	July 18, 1901	Abe Petaway	Unknown	Male	Black	Tennessee	Hanging	
61	July 18, 1901	Babe Battise	Unknown	Male	Black	Tennessee	Hanging	
62	July 18, 1901	Decur Thompson	Unknown	Male	Black	Tennessee	Hanging	
63	July 23, 1901	Elmer Barner	Unknown	Male	Unknown	Pennsylvania	Hanging	
64	July 26, 1901	Charles Anderson	Unknown	Male	Black	Arkansas	Hanging	
65	July 31, 1901	Martin Luther Fry	Unknown	Male	Unknown	Pennsylvania	Hanging	
66	August 2, 1901	James Kirby	Unknown	Male	Unknown	Florida	Hanging	
67	August 2, 1901	Robert Lee	Unknown	Male	Unknown	Florida	Hanging	
68	August 2, 1901	George Mitchell	Unknown	Male	Black	Georgia	Hanging	
69	August 2, 1901	Edmond Scott	21	Male	Black	Georgia	Hanging	
70	August 2, 1901	Juan Rocha	60	Male	Hispanic	Texas	Hanging	
71	August 5, 1901	Benjamin Pugh	21	Male	Black	New York	Electrocution	
72	August 6, 1901	Nathan Carruthers	Unknown	Male	Black	Tennessee	Hanging	
73	August 9, 1901	Jim Harris	Unknown	Male	Black	South Carolina	Hanging	
74	August 9, 1901	Eben L. Boyce	Unknown	Male	White	Washington	Hanging	
75	August 23, 1901	James Mercer	Unknown	Male	White	Florida	Hanging	
76	August 23, 1901	John H. Butler	Unknown	Male	Black	Maryland	Hanging	
77	August 23, 1901	John Fugate	Unknown	Male	Black	Virginia	Hanging	
78	August 23, 1901	Charles Nordstrom	Unknown	Male	White	Washington	Hanging	
79	August 27, 1901	Raymond Ross	22	Male	Black	Georgia	Hanging	
80	August 29, 1901	Joseph Zachello	28	Male	White	New York	Electrocution	
81	September 5, 1901	Levi Carroll	24	Male	Black	Georgia	Hanging	
82	September 6, 1901	Romulus Williams	Unknown	Male	Black	Georgia	Hanging	
83	September 6, 1901	James Fleming	Unknown	Male	White	Montana	Hanging	
84	September 13, 1901	William Monroe	18	Male	Black	North Carolina	Hanging	
85	September 20, 1901	Jim Brown	Unknown	Male	Black	Alabama	Hanging	
86	September 26, 1901	Nicolau Vassel	Unknown	Male	White	Pennsylvania	Hanging	
87	October 8, 1901	Henry Ivory	Unknown	Male	Black	Pennsylvania	Hanging	
88	October 8, 1901	Charles Perry	Unknown	Male	Black	Pennsylvania	Hanging	
89	October 11, 1901	George Dolinski	Unknown	Male	White	Illinois	Hanging	
90	October 19, 1901	Neal Ryles	25	Male	Black	Georgia	Hanging	
91	October 22, 1901	John Pearl	Unknown	Male	White	Texas	Hanging	
92	October 25, 1901	Will King	Unknown	Male	Black	Texas	Hanging	
93	October 29, 1901	Leon Frank Czolgosz	28	Male	White	New York	Electrocution	
94	November 1, 1901	Will Jackson	25	Male	Black	Georgia	Hanging	
95	November 2, 1901	Louis Council	Unknown	Male	Black	North Carolina	Hanging	
96	November 8, 1901	Will Jones	Unknown	Male	Black	Florida	Hanging	
97	November 15, 1901	Joseph Keith	40	Male	White	Indiana	Hanging	
98	November 20, 1901	Fred Krist	31	Male	White	New York	Electrocution	
99	November 30, 1901	Ed Rice	Unknown	Male	White	Idaho	Hanging	
100	December 3, 1901	Charles Brown	Unknown	Male	Unknown	New Jersey	Hanging	
101	December 6, 1901	Bud Wilson	Unknown	Male	Black	Arkansas	Hanging	
102	December 6, 1901	Thomas J. Hampton	Unknown	Male	Black	Florida	Hanging	
103	December 6, 1901	James G. Green	Unknown	Male	White	Washington	Hanging	
104	December 12, 1901	William Allen	Unknown	Male	Black	Pennsylvania	Hanging	
105	December 13, 1901	Frank Cannon	Unknown	Male	Black	Arkansas	Hanging	
106	December 13, 1901	William Kelley	Unknown	Male	Black	Arkansas	Hanging	
107	December 17, 1901	Luigi Storti	26	Male	White	Massachusetts	Electrocution	
108	December 20, 1901	Will Redding	26	Male	Black	Alabama	Hanging	
109	December 20, 1901	Jim Winton	25	Male	Black	Alabama	Hanging	
110	December 20, 1901	Reuben Quinn	48	Male	Black	Kentucky	Hanging	
111	December 20, 1901	Cicero Harris	Unknown	Male	Black	Virginia	Hanging	
112	December 24, 1901	Franciszek Umilian	34	Male	White	Massachusetts	Electrocution	
113	December 27, 1901	Robert Henson	Unknown	Male	Black	New Jersey	Hanging	

== Demographics ==
Gender
Male	113	100%
Female	0	0%
Ethnicity
Black	71	63%
White	32	28%
Unknown	7	6%
Hispanic	3	3%
State
Georgia	14	12%
Pennsylvania	11	10%
Arkansas	9	8%
Florida	10	9%
Louisiana	7	6%
New York	7	6%
Alabama	6	5%
Mississippi	4	4%
Tennessee	4	4%
Texas	4	4%
Virginia	4	4%
Washington	4	4%
Maryland	3	3%
New Jersey	3	3%
New Mexico	3	3%
North Carolina	3	3%
South Carolina	3	3%
Kentucky	2	2%
Massachusetts	2	2%
Missouri	2	2%
Ohio	2	2%
California	1	1%
Idaho	1	1%
Illinois	1	1%
Indiana	1	1%
Minnesota	1	1%
Montana	1	1%
Method
Hanging	102	89%
Electrocution	11	10%
Month
January	14	12%
February	5	4%
March	10	9%
April	9	8%
May	4	4%
June	9	8%
July	14	12%
August	15	13%
September	6	5%
October	7	6%
November	6	5%
December	14	12%
Age
Unknown	81	72%
18–29	20	18%
30–39	7	6%
40–49	3	3%
50–59	1	1%
60–69	1	1%
Total	113	100%

== Executions in recent years ==
Number of executions
1900	99
1901	113
1902	147
Total	359

== See also ==
- Lists of people executed in the United States

Preceded by 1900	List of people executed in the United States in 1901	Succeeded by 1902
