= A. W. Tiffany =

American politician

Member of the Washington House of Representatives for the 48th district
- In office 1891–1893

Personal details
- Born: July 8, 1827 Peru, Massachusetts, United States
- Died: February 17, 1903 (aged 75) Ferndale, Washington, United States
- Party: Republican

Allen White Tiffany (July 8, 1827 – February 17, 1903) was an American politician in the state of Washington. He served in the Washington House of Representatives from 1891 to 1893.
