= R. J. Glen =

American politician

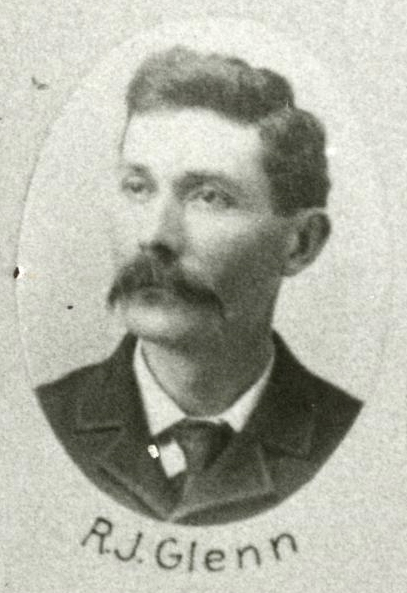
- Glen in 1895

Member of the Washington House of Representatives from the 38th district
- In office 1895–1897

Personal details
- Born: April 19, 1851 Minneapolis, Minnesota, U.S.
- Party: Populist

R. J. Glen (born April 19, 1851) was an American politician in the state of Washington. He served in the Washington House of Representatives from 1895 to 1897.
