= List of governors of Washington =

Governor of Washington
- Seal of the governor

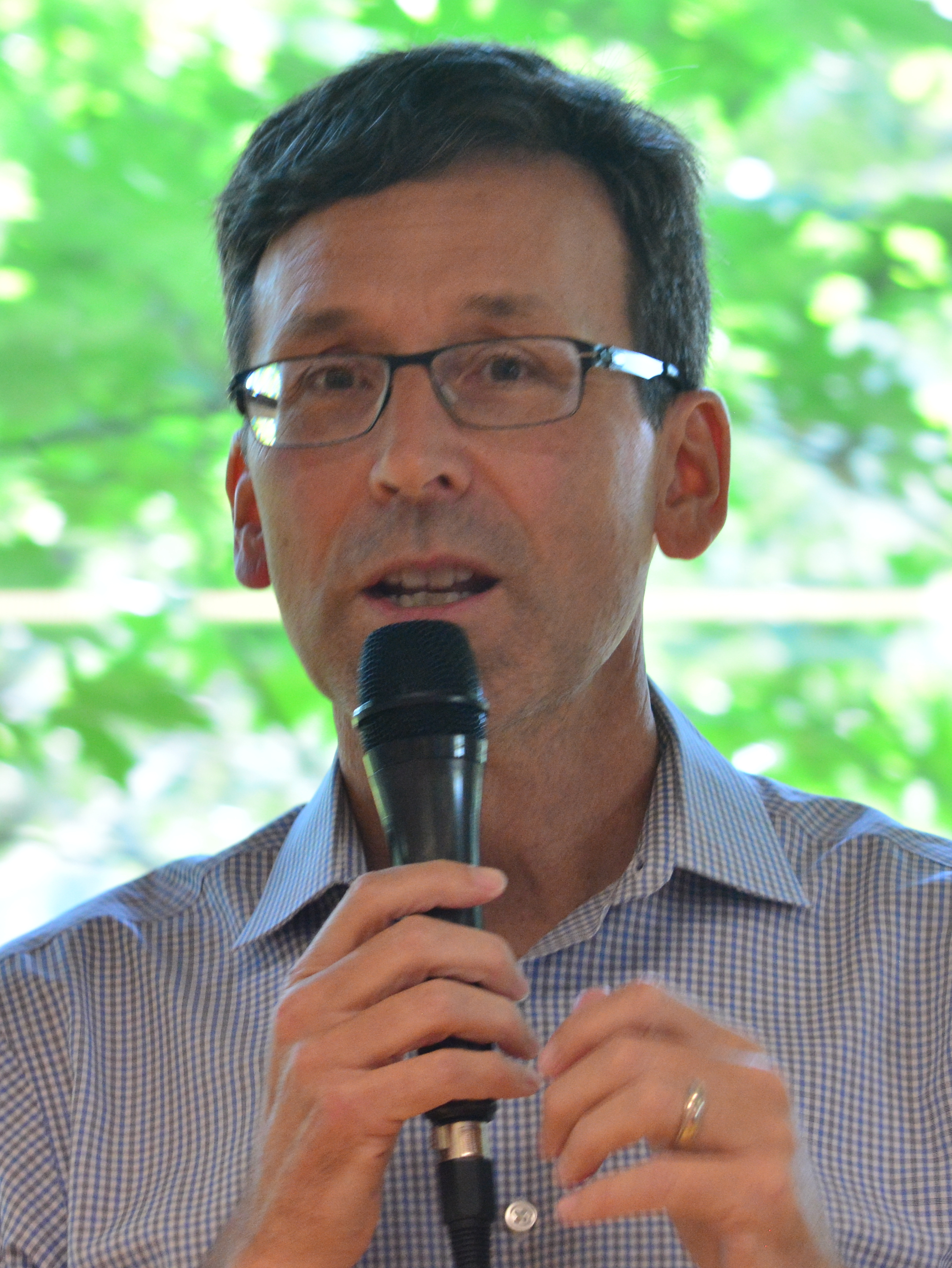
- Incumbent; Bob Ferguson since January 15, 2025
- Style: Governor (informal); The Honorable (formal)
- Status: Head of state; Head of government
- Residence: Washington Governor's Mansion
- Term length: Four years, no term limit
- Inaugural holder: Elisha P. Ferry
- Formation: November 11, 1889
- Succession: Line of succession
- Deputy: Lieutenant Governor of Washington
- Salary: $218,744
- Website: governor.wa.gov

The governor of Washington is the head of government of Washington and commander-in-chief of the state's military forces. The officeholder has a duty to enforce state laws, the power to either approve or veto bills passed by the Washington State Legislature and line-item veto power to cancel specific provisions in spending bills. The Washington governor may also convene the legislature on "extraordinary occasions".

Washington Territory had 14 territorial governors from its organization in 1853 until the formation of the state of Washington in 1889. Territorial governors were appointed by the president of the United States. Elisha P. Ferry had the longest term of eight years and went on to become the state's first governor. William H. Wallace was appointed governor but never took office due to being elected as the territory's congressional delegate. George Edward Cole was appointed governor and took office, but his appointment was never ratified by the U.S. Senate and he was replaced as governor after four months.

Twenty-two individuals have held the office of Governor of Washington since the state's admission to the Union, with Arthur B. Langlie serving non-consecutive terms. Populist Party candidate John Rankin Rogers is the only non-Democratic or Republican nominee to win office. The most recent governor to be from Eastern Washington was Clarence D. Martin, elected in 1932. The current governor is Democrat Bob Ferguson, who took office on January 15, 2025.

== List of governors ==
=== Territory of Washington ===
Washington Territory was organized on March 2, 1853, from the northern half of Oregon Territory.

Governors of the Territory of Washington
No.	Governor	Term in office (Note: The range given is from the date the governor was confirmed by the Senate, or appointed by the President during a Senate recess, to the date the governor's successor was confirmed, unless noted.)	Appointed by
1	Isaac Stevens (1818–1862)	March 17, 1853 (Note: Stevens was nominated and confirmed by the Senate on March 17, 1853, and arrived in Olympia on November 25.) – May 13, 1857 (1519 days; replaced) (Note: Stevens, whose replacement had been confirmed but not yet arrived in the territory, resigned on August 11, 1857, having been elected to the United States House of Representatives.)	Franklin Pierce
2	Fayette McMullen (1805–1880)	May 13, 1857 (Note: James Patton Anderson was nominated on March 12, 1857, and confirmed by the Senate on March 13, but declined. McMullen was appointed on May 13, 1857, during a Senate recess; nominated on December 22, 1857; and confirmed by the Senate on January 18, 1858. He took office on September 10, 1857.) – March 5, 1859 (662 days; replaced) (Note: McMullen left the territory in July 1858, without a formal resignation; the nomination of his successor only notes that the office is vacant. Territorial Secretary Charles H. Mason acted as governor until his successor arrived.)	James Buchanan
3	Richard D. Gholson (1804–1862)	March 5, 1859 (Note: Gholson was nominated and confirmed by the Senate on March 5, 1859, and he arrived in the territory on July 10.) – February 14, 1861 (713 days; resigned) (Note: Gholson left the territory in May 1860 on a leave of absence to move his wife from Texas to Kentucky, and never returned; he formally resigned on February 14, 1861, saying "I am unwilling for even a day to hold office under a (so-called) 'Republican' President." Territorial Secretary Henry McGill acted as governor until his successor arrived.)	James Buchanan
—	William H. Wallace (1811–1879)	April 9, 1861 – July 8, 1861 (91 days; resigned before taking office) (Note: Wallace was appointed on April 9, 1861, during a Senate recess; nominated on July 10; and confirmed by the Senate on July 16. However, even though he was a resident of the territory, he never took office, as he was elected to the United States House of Representatives on July 8. Territorial Secretary L. Jay S. Turney acted as governor until his successor arrived.)	Abraham Lincoln
4	William Pickering (1798–1873)	December 19, 1861 (Note: Pickering was nominated on December 5, 1861; confirmed by the Senate on December 19; and arrived in the territory in June 1862. He was reconfirmed by the Senate on January 9, 1866.) – November 21, 1866 (1799 days; replaced) (Note: President Johnson removed Pickering because he had publicly criticized Reconstruction era policies. Territorial Secretary Elwood Evans acted as governor until his successor arrived.)	Abraham Lincoln
4	William Pickering (1798–1873)	December 19, 1861 – November 21, 1866 (1799 days; replaced)	Andrew Johnson
5	George Edward Cole (1826–1906)	November 21, 1866 (Note: Cole was appointed on November 21, 1866, during a Senate recess; nominated on December 14; but was rejected by the Senate on March 1, 1867.) – March 1, 1867 (101 days; nomination failed) (Note: Cole's nomination was rejected by the Senate on March 1, 1867, and he left office on March 4. Territorial Secretary Elwood Evans acted as governor until his successor arrived.)	Andrew Johnson
6	Marshall F. Moore (1829–1870)	April 20, 1867 (Note: Charles E. De Long was nominated on April 15, 1867, but was rejected by the Senate on April 17. Moore was then nominated on April 19, and confirmed by the Senate on April 20.) – April 5, 1869 (717 days; replaced) (Note: McMullin & Walker say Moore resigned due to ill health, but the nomination of his successor specifies he was being removed.)	Andrew Johnson
7	Alvan Flanders (1825–1894)	April 5, 1869 (Note: Flanders was nominated on April 3, 1869, and confirmed by the Senate on April 5.) – March 14, 1870 (344 days; replaced)	Ulysses S. Grant
8	Edward S. Salomon (1836–1913)	March 14, 1870 (Note: Salomon was nominated on January 10, 1870, and confirmed by the Senate on March 14.) – April 26, 1872 (775 days; resigned) (Note: Salomon's resignation was requested due to "financial maneuvering and excessive absences".)	Ulysses S. Grant
9	Elisha P. Ferry (1825–1895)	April 26, 1872 (Note: James F. Legate was nominated on January 11, 1872, but was withdrawn on April 9. Ferry was then nominated on April 24, and confirmed by the Senate on April 26. He was reconfirmed by the Senate on May 2, 1876.) – April 26, 1880 (2923 days; replaced)	Ulysses S. Grant
10	William A. Newell (1817–1901)	April 26, 1880 (Note: Newell was nominated on April 9, 1880, for a term to begin April 26; and was confirmed by the Senate on April 21.) – July 2, 1884 (1529 days; replaced)	Rutherford B. Hayes
11	Watson C. Squire (1838–1926)	July 2, 1884 (Note: Squire was nominated on July 1, 1884, and confirmed by the Senate on July 2.) – April 9, 1887 (1012 days; replaced)	Chester A. Arthur
12	Eugene Semple (1840–1908)	April 9, 1887 (Note: Semple was appointed on April 9, 1887, during a Senate recess; nominated on January 4, 1888; and confirmed by the Senate on January 16.) – March 23, 1889 (715 days; replaced)	Grover Cleveland
13	Miles Conway Moore (1845–1919)	March 23, 1889 (Note: Moore was nominated on March 21, 1889, and confirmed by the Senate on March 23.) – November 18, 1889 (241 days; statehood)	Benjamin Harrison

=== State of Washington ===
Washington was admitted to the Union on November 11, 1889. The term for governor is four years, commencing on the second Monday in the January following the election. If the office of governor is vacant or the governor is unable to discharge their duties, the lieutenant governor assumes the duties of governor, though still officially retains the office of lieutenant governor. If both the offices of governor and lieutenant governor are unable to fulfill their duties, the secretary of state is next in line, and then the treasurer. There is no limit to the number of terms a governor may serve. The office of lieutenant governor is not elected on the same ticket as the governor.

Governors of the State of Washington
No.	Governor	Term in office	Party	Election	Lt. Governor (Note: Lieutenant governors represented the same party as their governor unless noted.)
1	Elisha P. Ferry (1825–1895)	November 18, 1889 – January 11, 1893 (1151 days; retired)	Republican	1889	Charles E. Laughton
2	John McGraw (1850–1910)	January 11, 1893 – January 13, 1897 (1464 days; retired)	Republican	1892	F. H. Luce
3	John Rankin Rogers (1838–1901)	January 13, 1897 – December 26, 1901 (1808 days; died in office)	Populist	1896	Thurston Daniels
3	John Rankin Rogers (1838–1901)	January 13, 1897 – December 26, 1901 (1808 days; died in office)	Democratic	1900	Henry McBride (Note: Represented the Republican Party)
4	Henry McBride (1856–1937)	December 26, 1901 – January 11, 1905 (1113 days; lost nomination)	Republican	Succeeded from lieutenant governor	Vacant
5	Albert E. Mead (1861–1913)	January 11, 1905 – January 27, 1909 (1478 days; lost nomination)	Republican	1904	Charles E. Coon
6	Samuel G. Cosgrove (1847–1909)	January 27, 1909 – March 28, 1909 (61 days; died in office)	Republican	1908	Marion E. Hay
7	Marion E. Hay (1865–1933)	March 28, 1909 – January 15, 1913 (1390 days; lost election)	Republican	Succeeded from lieutenant governor	Vacant
8	Ernest Lister (1870–1919)	January 15, 1913 – June 14, 1919 (2342 days; died in office)	Democratic	1912	Louis F. Hart
8	Ernest Lister (1870–1919)	January 15, 1913 – June 14, 1919 (2342 days; died in office)	Democratic	1916	Louis F. Hart
9	Louis F. Hart (1862–1929)	June 14, 1919 – January 14, 1925 (2042 days; retired)	Republican	Succeeded from lieutenant governor	Vacant
9	Louis F. Hart (1862–1929)	June 14, 1919 – January 14, 1925 (2042 days; retired)	Republican	1920	William J. Coyle
10	Roland H. Hartley (1864–1952)	January 14, 1925 – January 11, 1933 (2920 days; lost nomination) (Note: Hartley lost the Republican nomination to John Arthur Gellatly.)	Republican	1924	W. Lon Johnson
10	Roland H. Hartley (1864–1952)	January 14, 1925 – January 11, 1933 (2920 days; lost nomination)	Republican	1928	John Arthur Gellatly
11	Clarence D. Martin (1886–1955)	January 11, 1933 – January 15, 1941 (2927 days; lost nomination) (Note: Martin lost the Democratic nomination to Clarence Dill.)	Democratic	1932	Victor Aloysius Meyers (Note: Represented the Democratic Party)
11	Clarence D. Martin (1886–1955)	January 11, 1933 – January 15, 1941 (2927 days; lost nomination)	Democratic	1936	Victor Aloysius Meyers
12	Arthur B. Langlie (1900–1966)	January 15, 1941 – January 10, 1945 (1457 days; lost election)	Republican	1940	Victor Aloysius Meyers
13	Monrad Wallgren (1891–1961)	January 10, 1945 – January 12, 1949 (1464 days; lost election)	Democratic	1944	Victor Aloysius Meyers
14	Arthur B. Langlie (1900–1966)	January 12, 1949 – January 16, 1957 (2927 days; retired) (Note: Langlie instead ran unsuccessfully for the United States Senate.)	Republican	1948	Victor Aloysius Meyers
14	Arthur B. Langlie (1900–1966)	January 12, 1949 – January 16, 1957 (2927 days; retired)	Republican	1952	Emmett T. Anderson
15	Albert Rosellini (1910–2011)	January 16, 1957 – January 13, 1965 (2920 days; lost election)	Democratic	1956	John Cherberg
15	Albert Rosellini (1910–2011)	January 16, 1957 – January 13, 1965 (2920 days; lost election)	Democratic	1960	John Cherberg
16	Daniel J. Evans (1925–2024)	January 13, 1965 – January 12, 1977 (4383 days; retired)	Republican	1964	John Cherberg
16	Daniel J. Evans (1925–2024)	January 13, 1965 – January 12, 1977 (4383 days; retired)	Republican	1968	John Cherberg
16	Daniel J. Evans (1925–2024)	January 13, 1965 – January 12, 1977 (4383 days; retired)	Republican	1972	John Cherberg
17	Dixy Lee Ray (1914–1994)	January 12, 1977 – January 14, 1981 (1464 days; lost nomination) (Note: Ray lost the Democratic nomination to Jim McDermott.)	Democratic	1976	John Cherberg
18	John Spellman (1926–2018)	January 14, 1981 – January 16, 1985 (1464 days; lost election)	Republican	1980	John Cherberg
19	Booth Gardner (1936–2013)	January 16, 1985 – January 13, 1993 (2920 days; retired)	Democratic	1984	John Cherberg
19	Booth Gardner (1936–2013)	January 16, 1985 – January 13, 1993 (2920 days; retired)	Democratic	1988	Joel Pritchard
20	Mike Lowry (1939–2017)	January 13, 1993 – January 15, 1997 (1464 days; retired)	Democratic	1992	Joel Pritchard
21	Gary Locke (b. 1950)	January 15, 1997 – January 12, 2005 (2920 days; retired)	Democratic	1996	Brad Owen
21	Gary Locke (b. 1950)	January 15, 1997 – January 12, 2005 (2920 days; retired)	Democratic	2000	Brad Owen
22	Christine Gregoire (b. 1947)	January 12, 2005 – January 16, 2013 (2927 days; retired)	Democratic	2004	Brad Owen
22	Christine Gregoire (b. 1947)	January 12, 2005 – January 16, 2013 (2927 days; retired)	Democratic	2008	Brad Owen
23	Jay Inslee (b. 1951)	January 16, 2013 – January 15, 2025 (4383 days; retired)	Democratic	2012	Brad Owen
23	Jay Inslee (b. 1951)	January 16, 2013 – January 15, 2025 (4383 days; retired)	Democratic	2016	Cyrus Habib
23	Jay Inslee (b. 1951)	January 16, 2013 – January 15, 2025 (4383 days; retired)	Democratic	2020	Denny Heck
24	Bob Ferguson (b. 1965)	January 15, 2025 – Incumbent (Note: Ferguson's term will expire on January 8, 2029.) (in office 677 days)	Democratic	2024	Denny Heck

== Timeline ==
Timeline of Washington governors

== Electoral history (1952–) ==
Year	Democratic nominee			Republican nominee			Socialist Labor nominee			Socialist Workers nominee			Libertarian nominee			Other candidate			Other candidate			Other candidate		
Year	Candidate	#	%	Candidate	#	%	Candidate	#	%	Candidate	#	%	Candidate	#	%	Candidate	#	%	Candidate	#	%	Candidate	#	%
1952	Hugh Mitchell	510,675	47.35%	Arthur B. Langlie	567,822	52.65%	–			–			–			–			–			–		
1956	Albert Rosellini	616,773	54.63%	Emmett T. Anderson	508,041	45.00%	Henry Killman	4,163	0.37%	–			–			–			–			–		
1960	Albert Rosellini	611,987	50.34%	Lloyd J. Andrews	594,122	48.87%	Henry Killman	8,647	0.71%	Jack W. Wright	992	0.08%	–			–			–			–		
1964	Albert Rosellini	548,692	43.89%	Daniel J. Evans	697,256	55.77%	Henry Killman	4,326	0.35%	–			–			–			–			–		
1968	John J. O'Connell	560,262	44.28%	Daniel J. Evans	692,378	54.72%	Henry Killman	1,113	0.09%	–			–			Ken Chriswell (Conservative)	11,602	0.92%	–			–		
1972	Albert Rosellini	630,613	42.82%	Daniel J. Evans	747,825	50.78%	Henry Killman	2,709	0.18%	Robin David	4,552	0.31%	–			Vic Gould (Taxpayers)	86,843	5.90%	–			–		
1976	Dixy Lee Ray	821,797	53.14%	John Spellman	687,039	44.43%	Henry Killman	4,137	0.27%	Patricia A. Bethard	3,106	0.20%	Maurice Willey	4,133	0.27%	Art Manning (American Independent)	12,406	0.80%	Red Kelly (OWL)	12,400	0.80%	Evelyn Olafson (U.S. Labor)	1,364	0.09%
1980	Jim McDermott	749,813	43.32%	John Spellman	981,083	56.68%	–			–			–			–			–			–		
1984	Booth Gardner	1,006,993	53.31%	John Spellman	881,994	46.69%	–			–			–			–			–			–		
1988	Booth Gardner	1,166,448	62.21%	Bob Williams	708,481	37.79%	–			–			–			–			–			–		
1992	Mike Lowry	1,184,315	52.16%	Ken Eikenberry	1,086,216	47.84%	–			–			–			–			–			–		
1996	Gary Locke	1,296,492	57.96%	Ellen Craswell	940,538	42.04%	–			–			–			–			–			–		
2000	Gary Locke	1,441,973	58.38%	John Carlson	980,060	39.68%	–			–			Steve LePage	47,819	1.94%	–			–			–		
2004	Christine Gregoire	1,373,361	48.87%	Dino Rossi	1,373,228	48.87%	–			–			Ruth Bennett	63,464	2.26%	–			–			–		
2008	Christine Gregoire	1,598,738	53.24%	Dino Rossi	1,404,124	46.76%	–			–			–			–			–			–		
2012	Jay Inslee	1,582,802	51.54%	Rob McKenna	1,488,245	48.46%	–			–			–			–			–			–		
2016	Jay Inslee	1,760,520	54.25%	Bill Bryant	1,476,346	45.49%	–			–			–			–			–			–		
2020	Jay Inslee	2,294,243	56.56%	Loren Culp	1,749,066	43.12%	–			–			–			–			–			–		
2024	Bob Ferguson	2,143,368	55.51%	Dave Reichert	1,709,818	44.28%	–			–			–			–			–			–		

== See also ==
- Gubernatorial lines of succession in the United States § Washington
- First ladies and gentlemen of Washington
- Lieutenant Governor of Washington
- List of Washington state legislatures

== Sources ==
- "Former Washington Governors". National Governors Association.
- "Washington Constitution". State Democracy Research Initiative. University of Wisconsin Law School.
- Glashan, Roy R. (1979). American Governors and Gubernatorial Elections, 1775-1978. Meckler Books. ISBN 0-7201-1511-6 – via Internet Archive.
- Kallenbach, Joseph E.; Kallenbach, Jessamine S. (1977). American State Governors, 1776-1976. Oceana Publications. ISBN 978-0-379-00665-0 – via Internet Archive.
- McMullin, Thomas A.; Walker, David (1984). Biographical Directory of American Territorial Governors. Meckler Publishing. ISBN 0-930466-11-X – via Internet Archive.
- Mullaney, Marie Marmo (1994). Biographical Directory of the Governors of the United States, 1988–1994. Greenwood Publishing Group. ISBN 0-313-28312-5 – via Internet Archive.
- Sobel, Robert; Raimo, John (1978). Biographical Directory of the Governors of the United States, 1789-1978. Vol. 4. Meckler Books. ISBN 0-930466-01-2 – via Internet Archive.
- Thorpe, Francis Newton, ed. (1909). The Federal and State Constitutions, Colonial Charters, and Other Organic Laws of the States, Territories, and Colonies Now or Heretofore Forming the United States of America. Vol. 7. United States Government Publishing Office – via Internet Archive.
- Meany, Edmond S (1915). Governors of Washington : territorial and state. Seattle: University of Washington.
- "Washington Territorial and State Governors". Washington Secretary of State.
