= Lieutenant Governor of Washington =

Elected office in the U.S. state of Washington

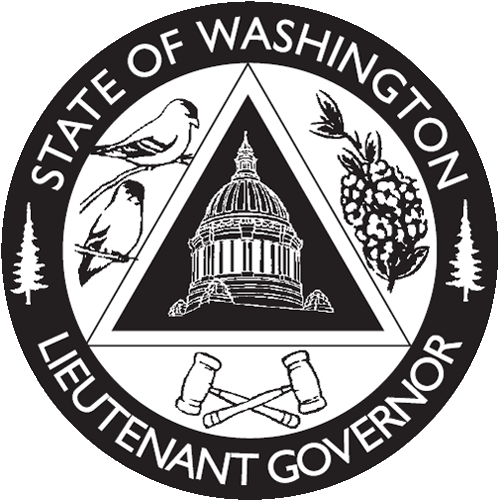
- Seal of the lieutenant governor

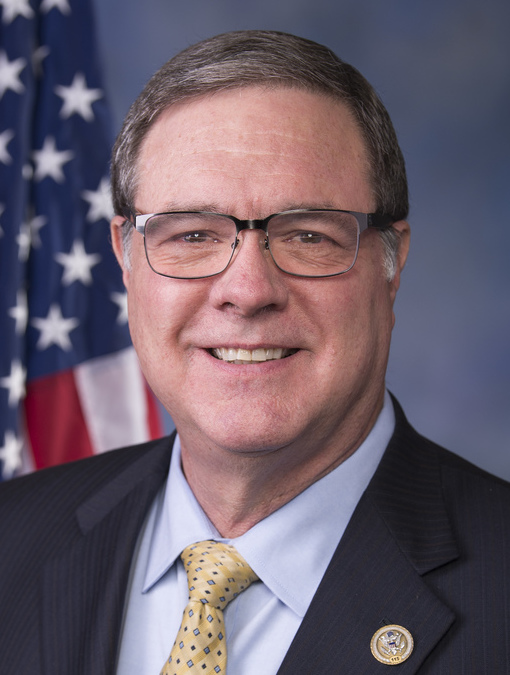
- Incumbent; Denny Heck since January 13, 2021
- Style: The Honorable
- Term length: 4 years, no term limits
- Inaugural holder: Charles E. Laughton
- Formation: November 11, 1889
- Succession: First
- Salary: $131,687
- Website: www.ltgov.wa.gov

The lieutenant governor of Washington is an elected office in the U.S. state of Washington. The incumbent is Denny Heck, a Democrat who began his term in January 2021. The lieutenant governor serves as president of the Washington State Senate, fills in as acting governor whenever the governor leaves the state or is unable to serve, and assumes the duties of governor in case of a vacancy.

There have been 17 holders of the office, three of whom have ascended to the office of governor of Washington. Prior to statehood, there were 10 territorial secretaries of state of Washington that acted in the territorial governor's absence, but were unable to ascend to governor.

== List of lieutenant governors of Washington ==
Parties

Democratic (5) Populist (1) Republican (11)

#	Lieutenant governor	Took office	Left office	Governor(s) served under	Party	Notes
1	Charles Laughton	November 11, 1889	January 11, 1893	Elisha Peyre Ferry	Republican	
2	F. H. Luce	January 11, 1893	January 13, 1897	John McGraw	Republican	
3	Thurston Daniels	January 13, 1897	January 16, 1901	John Rankin Rogers	Populist	
4	Henry McBride	January 16, 1901	December 26, 1901	John Rankin Rogers	Republican	Became governor upon the death of Gov. Rogers
Vacant (December 26, 1901 – January 11, 1905)
5	Charles E. Coon	January 11, 1905	January 13, 1909	Albert E. Mead	Republican	
6	Marion E. Hay	January 27, 1909	March 28, 1909	Samuel G. Cosgrove	Republican	Became governor upon the death of Gov. Cosgrove
Vacant (March 28, 1909 – January 15, 1913)
7	Louis Folwell Hart	January 15, 1913	February 13, 1919	Ernest Lister	Republican	Became governor upon the resignation of Gov. Lister
Vacant (February 13, 1919 – January 12, 1921)
8	William J. Coyle	January 12, 1921	January 14, 1925	Louis Folwell Hart	Republican	
9	W. Lon Johnson	January 14, 1925	January 16, 1929	Roland H. Hartley	Republican	
10	John Arthur Gellatly	January 16, 1929	January 11, 1933	Roland H. Hartley	Republican	
11	Victor A. Meyers	January 11, 1933	January 14, 1953	Clarence D. Martin (Democratic); Arthur B. Langlie (Republican); Monrad C. Wallgren (Democratic); Arthur B. Langlie (Republican)	Democratic	
12	Emmett Anderson	January 14, 1953	January 16, 1957	Arthur B. Langlie	Republican	
13	John A. Cherberg	January 16, 1957	January 11, 1989	Albert Rosellini (Democratic); Daniel J. Evans (Republican); Dixy Lee Ray (Democratic); John Spellman (Republican); Booth Gardner (Democratic)	Democratic	
14	Joel Pritchard	January 11, 1989	January 15, 1997	Booth Gardner (Democratic); Mike Lowry (Democratic)	Republican	
15	Brad Owen	January 15, 1997	January 11, 2017	Gary Locke; Christine Gregoire; Jay Inslee	Democratic	
16	Cyrus Habib	January 11, 2017	January 13, 2021	Jay Inslee	Democratic	
17	Denny Heck	January 13, 2021	present	Jay Inslee; Bob Ferguson	Democratic	
