= 1908 Washington gubernatorial election =

- November 3, 1908
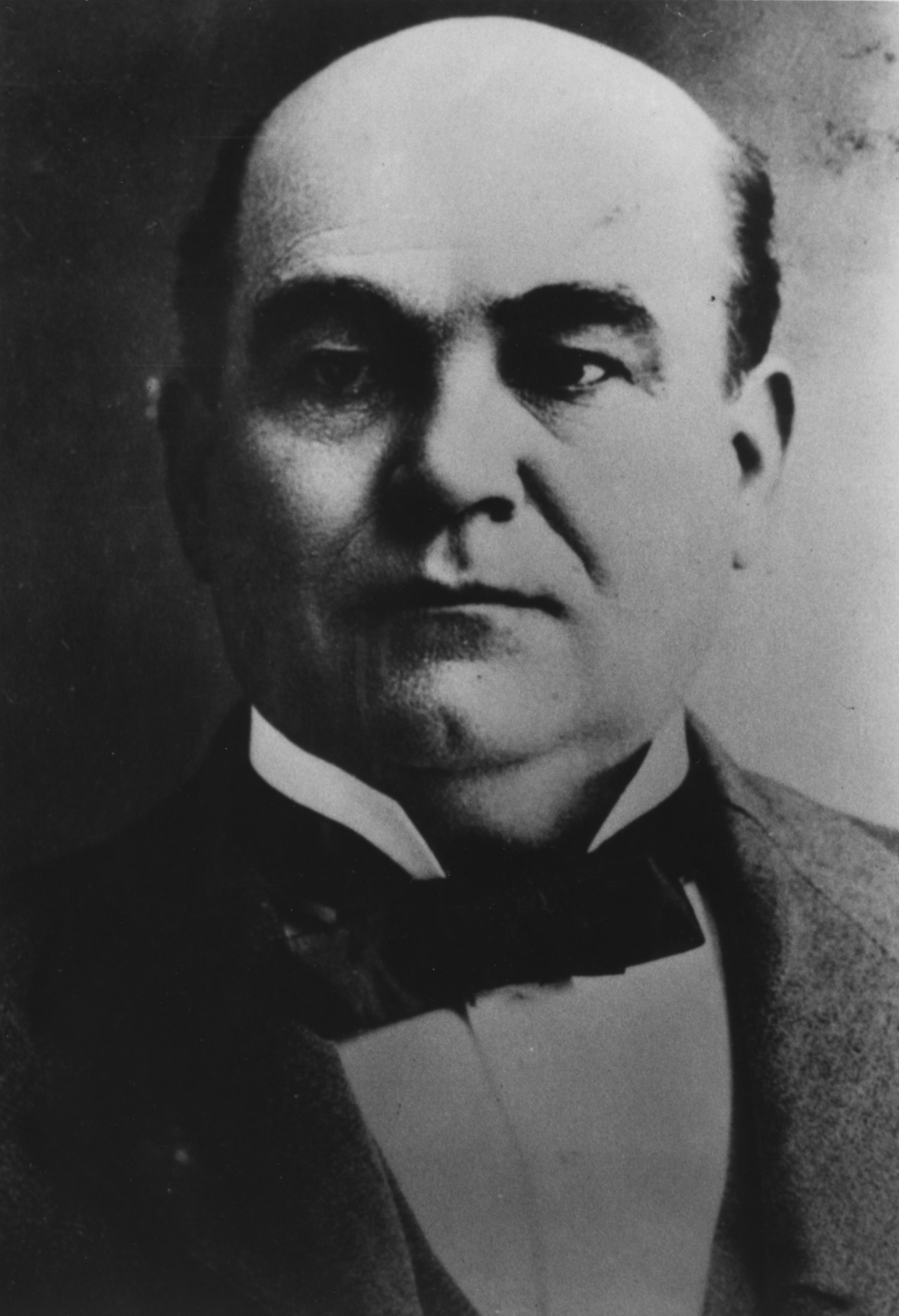

Nominee	Samuel G. Cosgrove	John Pattison
Party	Republican	Democratic
Popular vote	110,190	58,126
Percentage	62.56%	33.00%
- County results Cosgrove: 40–50% 50–60% 60–70% 70–80%
Governor before election
Albert E. Mead
Republican
Elected Governor
Samuel G. Cosgrove
Republican

The 1908 Washington gubernatorial election was held on November 3, 1908. Republican nominee Samuel G. Cosgrove defeated Democratic nominee John Pattison with 62.56% of the vote.

== Primary election ==
Primary elections were held on September 8, 1908. When Washington began using primary elections to nominate candidates, it used a form of ranked-choice voting although the original method was quite different from the modern understanding of RCV. If four or more candidates registered for a party's nomination for a particular office, voters in the primary were to make a first choice and second choice among the candidates. If a candidate received more than 40% of the first choice votes, he was declared the winner. Otherwise, the second choice votes were added to the first choice votes for all candidates and whoever had the highest number of combined votes was declared the winner, even if that was not a majority.

=== Republican party ===
==== Candidates ====
- Samuel G. Cosgrove, attorney
- Albert E. Mead, incumbent Governor
- Henry McBride, former Governor
- John D. Atkinson
- William M. Ridpath
- Robert B. Brown
- Oscar H. Neil
- J.W. Robinson

==== Results ====
Republican primary results, first choice
Party	Candidate	Votes	%
Republican	Henry McBride	33,509	32.85%
Republican	Albert E. Mead (incumbent)	32.357	31.72%
Republican	Samuel G. Cosgrove	25,519	25.02%
Republican	John D. Atkinson	4,084	4.00%
Republican	William M. Ridpath	3,298	3.23%
Republican	J.W. Robinson	1,488	1.46%
Republican	Oscar H. Neil	1,136	1.11%
Republican	Robert B. Brown	604	0.59%
Total votes		101,995	100.00%

Since no candidate received more than 40% of the first choice votes, the second choice votes were counted.

Republican primary results, combined
Party	Candidate	Votes	%
Republican	Samuel G. Cosgrove	57,667	28.30%
Republican	Albert E. Mead (incumbent)	49,402	24.24%
Republican	Henry McBride	47,594	23.35%
Republican	John D. Atkinson	21,527	10.56%
Republican	William M. Ridpath	10,702	5.25%
Republican	Robert B. Brown	5,973	2.93%
Republican	Oscar H. Neil	5,830	2.86%
Republican	J.W. Robinson	5,108	2.51%
Total votes		203,803	100.00%

=== Democratic party ===
==== Candidates ====
- John Pattison, Mayor of Colfax
- A.J. Splawn
- William Blackman
- Jimmie Durkin
- Patrick S. Byrne

==== Results ====
Democratic primary results, first choice
Party	Candidate	Votes	%
Democratic	John Pattison	4,179	32.35%
Democratic	A.J. Splawn	3,479	26.93%
Democratic	Jimmie Durkin	2,240	17.34%
Democratic	William Blackman	1,907	14.76%
Democratic	Patrick S. Byrne	1,115	8.63%
Total votes		12,920	100.00%

Since no candidate received more than 40% of the first choice votes, the second choice votes were counted.

Democratic primary results, combined
Party	Candidate	Votes	%
Democratic	John Pattison	6,268	24.30%
Democratic	A.J. Splawn	6,050	23.46%
Democratic	William Blackman	5,844	22.66%
Democratic	Jimmie Durkin	4,398	17.05%
Democratic	Patrick S. Byrne	3,230	12.52%
Total votes		25,790	100.00%

== General election ==
=== Candidates ===
Major party candidates

- Samuel G. Cosgrove, Republican
- John Pattison, Democratic

Other candidates

- George Boomer, Socialist
- Arthur S. Caton, Prohibition

=== Results ===
1908 Washington gubernatorial election
Party	Candidate	Votes	%	±%
Republican	Samuel G. Cosgrove	110,190	62.56%	+11.21%
Democratic	John Pattison	58,126	33.00%	−7.87%
Socialist	George Boomer	4,311	2.45%	−2.68%
Prohibition	Arthur S. Caton	3,514	1.99%	+0.07%
Majority		52,064	29.56%	
Total votes		176,141	100.00%	
Republican hold		Swing	+19.08%	

=== Results by county ===
County	Samuel G. Cosgrove Republican		John Pattison Democratic		George Boomer Socialist		Arthur S. Caton Prohibition		Margin		Total votes cast
County	#	%	#	%	#	%	#	%	#	%	Total votes cast
Adams	1,033	56.98%	750	41.37%	0	0.00%	30	1.65%	283	15.61%	1,813
Asotin	693	65.07%	338	31.74%	12	1.13%	22	2.07%	355	33.33%	1,065
Benton	913	60.54%	479	31.76%	94	6.23%	22	1.46%	434	28.78%	1,508
Chehalis	3,422	69.54%	1,186	24.10%	266	5.41%	47	0.96%	2,236	45.44%	4,921
Chelan	1,776	66.57%	851	31.90%	0	0.00%	41	1.54%	925	34.67%	2,668
Clallam	987	67.70%	459	31.48%	0	0.00%	12	0.82%	528	36.21%	1,458
Clark	2,555	65.00%	1,136	28.90%	169	4.30%	71	1.81%	1,419	36.10%	3,931
Columbia	872	56.92%	632	41.25%	0	0.00%	28	1.83%	240	15.67%	1,532
Cowlitz	1,619	70.15%	623	26.99%	37	1.60%	29	1.26%	996	43.15%	2,308
Douglas	2,017	56.04%	1,559	43.32%	0	0.00%	23	0.64%	458	12.73%	3,599
Ferry	512	55.77%	402	43.79%	0	0.00%	4	0.44%	110	11.98%	918
Franklin	688	58.21%	470	39.76%	7	0.59%	17	1.44%	218	18.44%	1,182
Garfield	601	61.20%	354	36.05%	17	1.73%	10	1.02%	247	25.15%	982
Island	505	67.88%	157	21.10%	67	9.01%	15	2.02%	348	46.77%	744
Jefferson	885	67.87%	392	30.06%	19	1.46%	8	0.61%	493	37.81%	1,304
King	23,632	61.95%	13,939	36.54%	0	0.00%	574	1.50%	9,693	25.41%	38,145
Kitsap	1,987	64.33%	751	24.31%	297	9.61%	54	1.75%	1,236	40.01%	3,089
Kittitas	1,772	62.73%	1,002	35.47%	0	0.00%	51	1.81%	770	27.26%	2,825
Klickitat	1,328	69.42%	549	28.70%	0	0.00%	36	1.88%	779	40.72%	1,913
Lewis	3,214	63.59%	1,472	29.13%	298	5.90%	70	1.39%	1,742	34.47%	5,054
Lincoln	2,107	58.28%	1,453	40.19%	21	0.58%	34	0.94%	654	18.09%	3,615
Mason	587	63.67%	322	34.92%	0	0.00%	13	1.41%	265	28.74%	922
Okanogan	1,530	57.98%	1,028	38.95%	68	2.58%	13	0.49%	502	19.02%	2,639
Pacific	1,470	70.13%	537	25.62%	80	3.82%	9	0.43%	933	44.51%	2,096
Pierce	11,586	67.10%	4,701	27.23%	649	3.76%	331	1.92%	6,885	39.87%	17,267
San Juan	621	74.11%	143	17.06%	72	8.59%	2	0.24%	478	57.04%	838
Skagit	3,110	63.97%	1,367	28.12%	321	6.60%	64	1.32%	1,743	35.85%	4,862
Skamania	350	73.53%	119	25.00%	0	0.00%	7	1.47%	231	48.53%	476
Snohomish	5,913	60.45%	2,700	27.60%	573	5.86%	595	6.08%	3,213	32.85%	9,781
Spokane	11,700	59.82%	6,869	35.12%	597	3.05%	393	2.01%	4,831	24.70%	19,559
Stevens	2,613	57.48%	1,554	34.18%	292	6.42%	87	1.91%	1,059	23.30%	4,546
Thurston	2,001	64.22%	985	31.61%	0	0.00%	130	4.17%	1,016	32.61%	3,116
Wahkiakum	495	78.95%	132	21.05%	0	0.00%	0	0.00%	363	57.89%	627
Walla Walla	2,670	57.85%	1,881	40.76%	30	0.65%	34	0.74%	789	17.10%	4,615
Whatcom	5,341	66.88%	2,273	28.46%	164	2.05%	208	2.60%	3,068	38.42%	7,986
Whitman	3,053	49.34%	2,946	47.61%	0	0.00%	189	3.05%	107	1.73%	6,188
Yakima	4,032	66.66%	1,615	26.70%	161	2.66%	241	3.98%	2,417	39.96%	6,049
Totals	110,190	62.56%	58,126	33.00%	4,311	2.45%	3,514	1.99%	52,064	29.56%	176,141

==== Counties that flipped from Democratic to Republican ====
- Adams
- Columbia
- Douglas
- Ferry
- Franklin
- Garfield
- Lincoln
- Okanogan
- Spokane
- Stevens
- Walla Walla
- Whitman
