= Charles Coon =

Charles Coon may refer to:

- Charles E. Coon (1842–1920), American politician from the state of Washington
- Charles L. Coon (1868–1927), teacher, school administrator and child labor reformer
- Charles Coon (bridge) (1931–2003), American bridge player
