= Henry McBride =

Henry McBride may refer to:

- Henry McBride (politician) (1856–1937), governor of Washington
- Henry McBride (art critic) (1867–1962), American art critic
