= 1916 Washington gubernatorial election =

- November 7, 1916
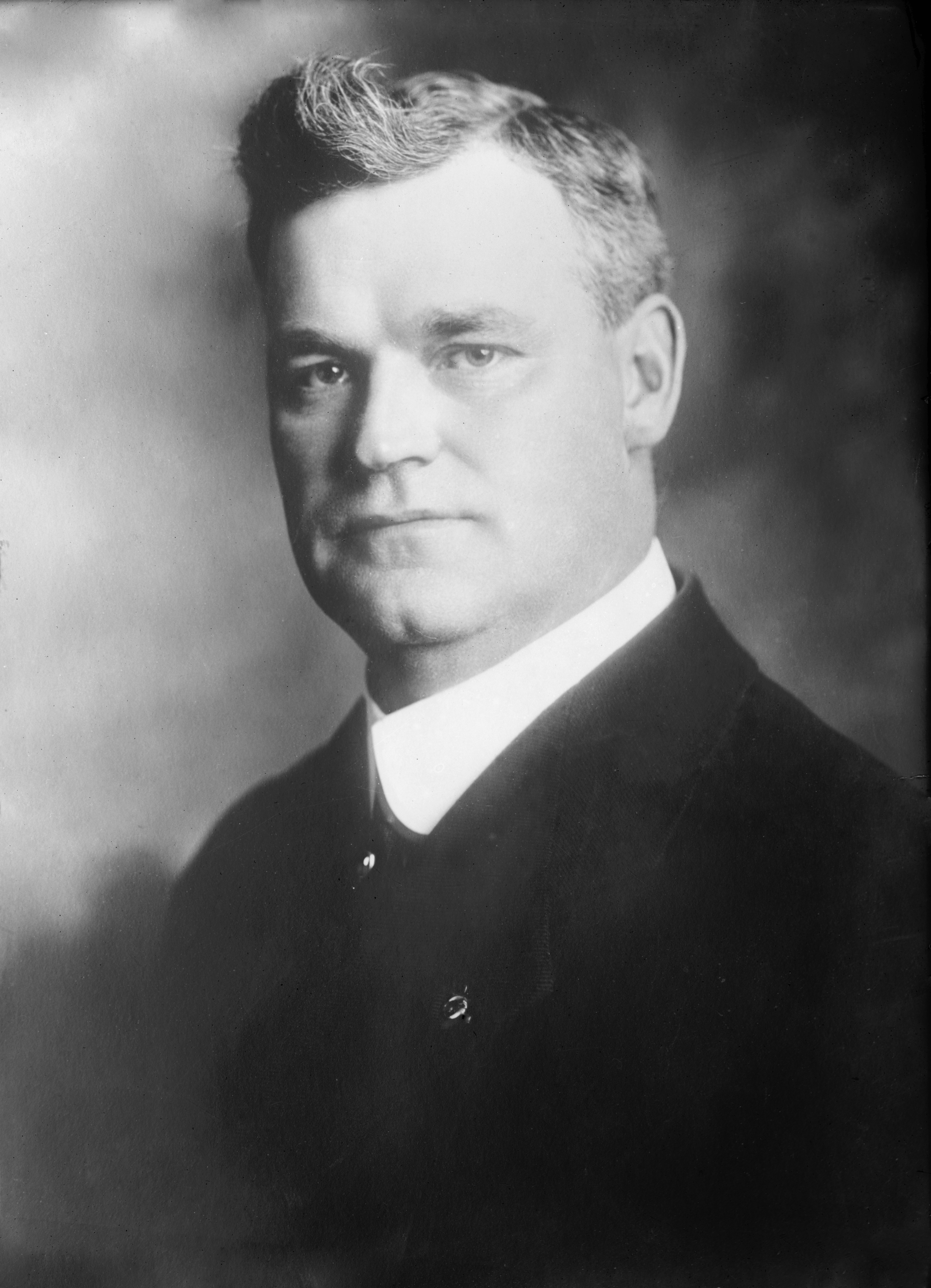

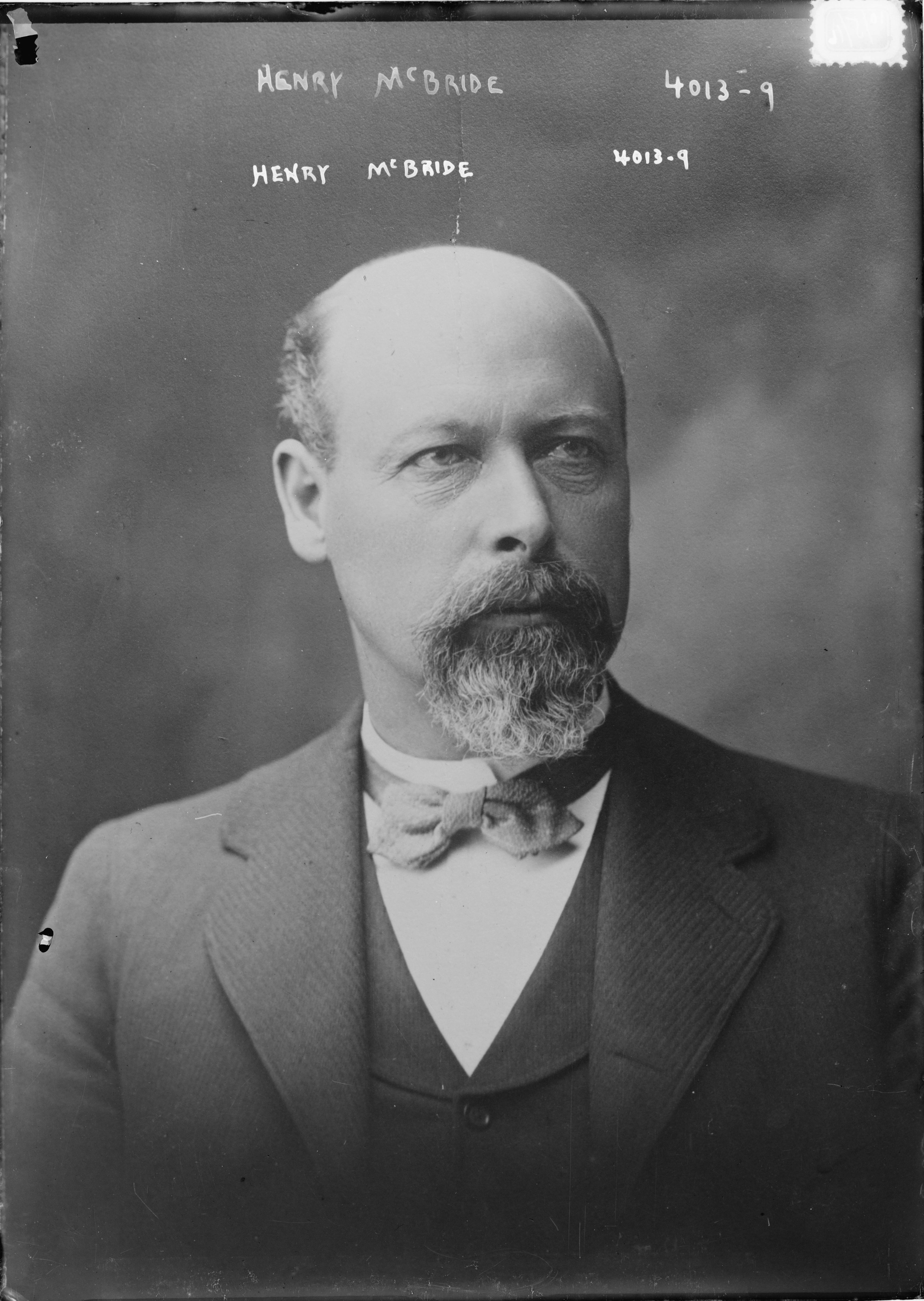

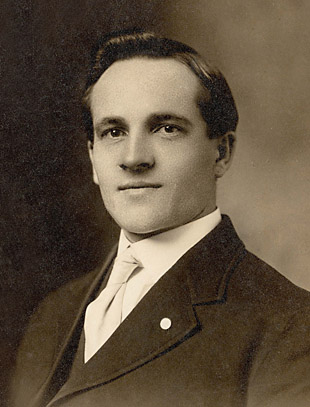
Nominee	Ernest Lister	Henry McBride	L. E. Katterfeld
Party	Democratic	Republican	Socialist
Popular vote	181,645	167,809	21,117
Percentage	48.10%	44.44%	5.59%
- County results Lister: 40–50% 50–60% 60–70% McBride: 40–50% 50–60%
Governor before election
Ernest Lister
Democratic
Elected Governor
Ernest Lister
Democratic

The 1916 Washington gubernatorial election was held on November 7, 1916. Incumbent Democrat Ernest Lister defeated Republican nominee Henry McBride with 48.10% of the vote.

== Primary election ==
Primary elections were held on September 12, 1916.

=== Democratic party ===
==== Candidates ====
- Ernest Lister, incumbent Governor
- William Edwin Cass

==== Results ====
Democratic primary results
Party	Candidate	Votes	%
Democratic	Ernest Lister (incumbent)	28,620	88.30%
Democratic	William Edwin Cass	3,794	11.70%
Total votes		32,414	100.00%

=== Republican party ===
==== Candidates ====
- Henry McBride, former Governor
- Roland H. Hartley, State Representative
- W. J. Sutton
- George A. Lee
- Robert T. Hodge
- James McNeely
- John G. Lewis
- J. E. Frost

==== Results ====
Republican primary results, first choice
Party	Candidate	Votes	%
Republican	Henry McBride	45,300	24.23%
Republican	Roland H. Hartley	38,615	20.66%
Republican	W. J. Sutton	29,400	15.73%
Republican	George A. Lee	23,097	12.36%
Republican	James McNeely	19,065	10.20%
Republican	Robert T. Hodge	18,362	9.82%
Republican	John G. Lewis	7,444	3.98%
Republican	J. E. Frost	5,650	3.02%
Total votes		186,933	100.00%

Since no candidate received more than 40% of the first choice votes, the second choice votes were counted.

Republican primary results, combined
Party	Candidate	Votes	%
Republican	Henry McBride	79,124	21.20%
Republican	Roland H. Hartley	68,238	18.28%
Republican	W. J. Sutton	51,389	13.77%
Republican	George A. Lee	48,553	13.01%
Republican	Robert T. Hodge	43,589	11.68%
Republican	James McNeely	41,285	11.06%
Republican	John G. Lewis	21,012	5.63%
Republican	J. E. Frost	20,047	5.37%
Total votes		373,237	100.00%

=== Progressive party ===
==== Candidates ====
- James E. Bradford

==== Results ====
Progressive primary results
Party	Candidate	Votes	%
Progressive	James E. Bradford	325	100.00%
Total votes		325	100.00%

== General election ==
=== Candidates ===
Major party candidates

- Ernest Lister, Democratic
- Henry McBride, Republican

Other candidates

- L. E. Katterfeld, Socialist
- August B. L. Gellerman, Prohibition
- James E. Bradford, Progressive
- James E. Riordan, Socialist Labor

=== Results ===
1916 Washington gubernatorial election
Party	Candidate	Votes	%	±%
Democratic	Ernest Lister (incumbent)	181,645	48.10%	+17.55%
Republican	Henry McBride	167,809	44.44%	+14.08%
Socialist	L. E. Katterfeld	21,117	5.59%	−6.08%
Prohibition	August B. L. Gellerman	3,514	0.93%	−1.63%
Progressive	James E. Bradford	2,894	0.77%	−23.65%
Socialist Labor	James E. Riordan	623	0.16%	−0.27%
Majority		13,836	3.66%	
Total votes		377,602	100.00%	
Democratic hold		Swing	+3.56%	

=== Results by county ===
County	Ernest Lister Democratic		Henry McBride Republican		L. E. Katterfeld Socialist		August B. L. Gellerman Prohibition		James E. Bradford Progressive		James E. Riordan Socialist Labor		Margin		Total votes cast
County	#	%	#	%	#	%	#	%	#	%	#	%	#	%	Total votes cast
Adams	1,581	59.53%	970	36.52%	96	3.61%	6	0.23%	2	0.08%	1	0.04%	611	23.00%	2,656
Asotin	1,185	52.39%	927	40.98%	109	4.82%	36	1.59%	3	0.13%	2	0.09%	258	11.41%	2,262
Benton	1,561	48.63%	1,332	41.50%	276	8.60%	27	0.84%	9	0.28%	5	0.16%	229	7.13%	3,210
Chelan	3,246	51.18%	2,626	41.41%	348	5.49%	94	1.48%	22	0.35%	6	0.09%	620	9.78%	6,342
Clallam	1,390	42.30%	1,483	45.13%	389	11.84%	11	0.33%	3	0.09%	10	0.30%	-93	-2.83%	3,286
Clark	2,904	32.86%	5,093	57.63%	663	7.50%	149	1.69%	26	0.29%	3	0.03%	-2,189	-24.77%	8,838
Columbia	1,241	50.69%	1,081	44.16%	94	3.84%	29	1.18%	3	0.12%	0	0.00%	160	6.54%	2,448
Cowlitz	1,391	36.37%	2,035	53.20%	347	9.07%	40	1.05%	8	0.21%	4	0.10%	-644	-16.84%	3,825
Douglas	2,014	62.68%	1,038	32.31%	121	3.77%	23	0.72%	14	0.44%	3	0.09%	976	30.38%	3,213
Ferry	909	53.69%	577	34.08%	197	11.64%	5	0.30%	3	0.18%	2	0.12%	332	19.61%	1,693
Franklin	1,181	62.52%	586	31.02%	98	5.19%	13	0.69%	8	0.42%	3	0.16%	595	31.50%	1,889
Garfield	775	49.05%	768	48.61%	31	1.96%	4	0.25%	1	0.06%	1	0.06%	7	0.44%	1,580
Grant	1,408	46.50%	1,338	44.19%	214	7.07%	31	1.02%	36	1.19%	1	0.03%	70	2.31%	3,028
Grays Harbor	5,004	44.03%	4,957	43.61%	1,272	11.19%	74	0.65%	42	0.37%	17	0.15%	47	0.41%	11,366
Island	1,016	55.46%	643	35.10%	149	8.13%	13	0.71%	10	0.55%	1	0.05%	373	20.36%	1,832
Jefferson	769	36.95%	1,160	55.74%	125	6.01%	10	0.48%	16	0.77%	1	0.05%	-391	-18.79%	2,081
King	45,438	48.32%	43,350	46.10%	2,721	2.89%	416	0.44%	1,876	2.00%	229	0.24%	2,088	2.22%	94,030
Kitsap	2,909	42.41%	3,138	45.74%	702	10.23%	62	0.90%	32	0.47%	17	0.25%	-229	-3.34%	6,860
Kittitas	2,557	48.24%	2,409	45.44%	243	4.58%	68	1.28%	17	0.32%	7	0.13%	148	2.79%	5,301
Klickitat	1,654	50.77%	1,399	42.94%	168	5.16%	27	0.83%	6	0.18%	4	0.12%	255	7.83%	3,258
Lewis	4,838	45.74%	4,752	44.92%	792	7.49%	145	1.37%	44	0.42%	7	0.07%	86	0.81%	10,578
Lincoln	3,050	56.07%	2,143	39.39%	199	3.66%	29	0.53%	15	0.28%	4	0.07%	907	16.67%	5,440
Mason	795	45.56%	758	43.44%	151	8.65%	8	0.46%	11	0.63%	22	1.26%	37	2.12%	1,745
Okanogan	3,075	57.37%	1,817	33.90%	430	8.02%	21	0.39%	10	0.19%	7	0.13%	1,258	23.47%	5,360
Pacific	1,610	36.37%	2,516	56.83%	251	5.67%	31	0.70%	16	0.36%	3	0.07%	-906	-20.47%	4,427
Pend Oreille	1,066	49.98%	952	44.63%	94	4.41%	11	0.52%	8	0.38%	2	0.09%	114	5.34%	2,133
Pierce	19,590	50.74%	16,524	42.80%	1,730	4.48%	543	1.41%	126	0.33%	94	0.24%	3,066	7.94%	38,607
San Juan	494	35.57%	775	55.80%	109	7.85%	7	0.50%	4	0.29%	0	0.00%	-281	-20.23%	1,389
Skagit	5,192	50.09%	4,007	38.66%	943	9.10%	144	1.39%	60	0.58%	20	0.19%	1,185	11.43%	10,366
Skamania	389	41.25%	503	53.34%	42	4.45%	7	0.74%	2	0.21%	0	0.00%	-114	-12.09%	943
Snohomish	9,040	45.11%	8,080	40.32%	2,616	13.05%	201	1.00%	69	0.34%	33	0.16%	960	4.79%	20,039
Spokane	21,236	49.66%	19,937	46.62%	1,134	2.65%	324	0.76%	77	0.18%	57	0.13%	1,299	3.04%	42,765
Stevens	3,490	52.73%	2,404	36.33%	645	9.75%	54	0.82%	22	0.33%	3	0.05%	1,086	16.41%	6,618
Thurston	2,493	37.81%	3,248	49.26%	613	9.30%	145	2.20%	65	0.99%	30	0.45%	-755	-11.45%	6,594
Wahkiakum	382	41.48%	430	46.69%	102	11.07%	3	0.33%	2	0.22%	2	0.22%	-48	-5.21%	921
Walla Walla	4,991	54.10%	4,040	43.79%	150	1.63%	34	0.37%	8	0.09%	2	0.02%	951	10.31%	9,225
Whatcom	6,158	39.26%	7,202	45.92%	1,838	11.72%	312	1.99%	143	0.91%	32	0.20%	-1,044	-6.66%	15,685
Whitman	6,098	54.59%	4,749	42.51%	208	1.86%	105	0.94%	8	0.07%	3	0.03%	1,349	12.08%	11,171
Yakima	7,625	51.81%	6,061	41.18%	707	4.80%	252	1.71%	67	0.46%	6	0.04%	1,564	10.63%	14,718
Totals	181,645 (Note: The county figures add up to 181,745)	48.10%	167,809 (Note: The county figures add up to 167,808)	44.44%	21,117	5.59%	3,514	0.93%	2,894	0.77%	623 (Note: The county figures add up to 644)	0.16%	13,836	3.66%	377,602

==== Counties that flipped from Republican to Democratic ====
- Asotin
- Benton
- Chelan
- Ferry
- Franklin
- Grant
- Grays Harbor
- Island
- Klickitat
- Lewis
- Okanogan
- Pend Oreille
- Skagit
- Spokane
- Yakima

==== Counties that flipped from Progressive to Democratic ====
- Garfield
- Snohomish
