= E. B. Hyde =

American politician (1849–1917)

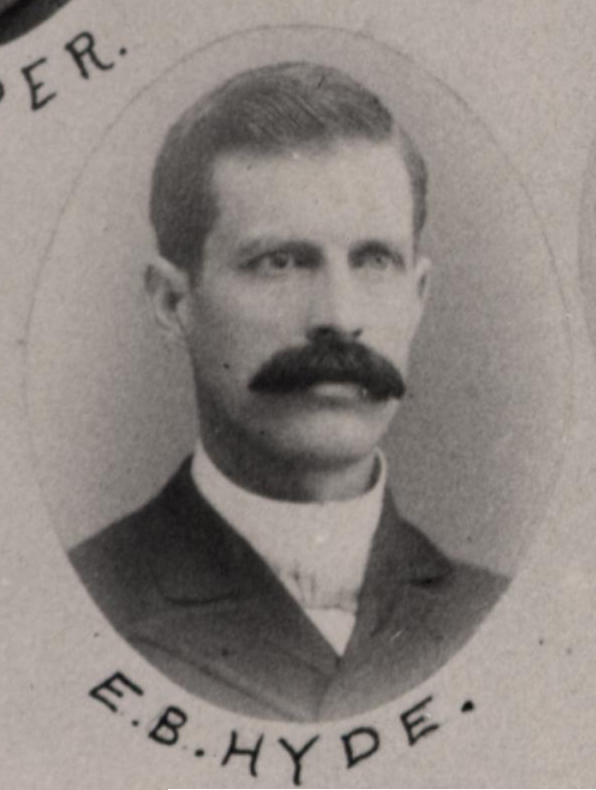
- Hyde in 1891

Member of the Washington State Senate for the 4th district
- In office January 7, 1891 – January 14, 1895
- Preceded by: F. H. Luce
- Succeeded by: C. W. Ide

Personal details
- Born: January 13, 1849 Utica, Winnebago County, Wisconsin, United States
- Died: May 26, 1917 (aged 68) Spokane, Washington, United States
- Party: Republican

Eugene B. Hyde (January 13, 1849 – May 26, 1917) was an American politician in the state of Washington. He served in the Washington State Senate from 1891 to 1895.
