= Henry McBride (politician) =

4th governor of Washington

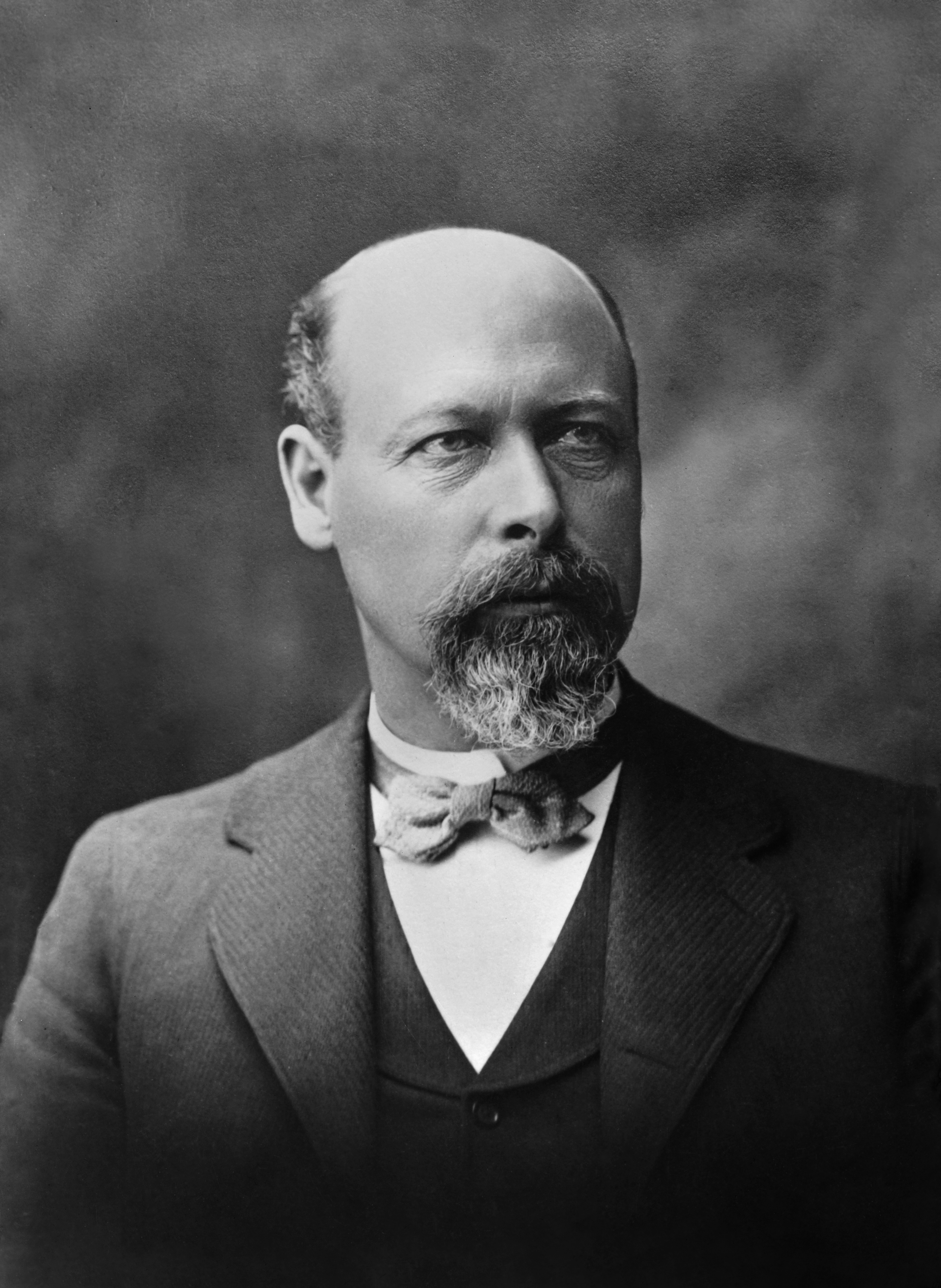
- McBride c. 1915–1920

4th Governor of Washington
- In office December 26, 1901 – January 11, 1905
- Lieutenant: Vacant
- Preceded by: John Rankin Rogers
- Succeeded by: Albert E. Mead

4th Lieutenant Governor of Washington
- In office January 16, 1901 – December 26, 1901
- Governor: John Rankin Rogers
- Preceded by: Thurston Daniels
- Succeeded by: Charles E. Coon

Personal details
- Born: February 7, 1856 (Note: The exact date of McBride's birth remains controversial. Some sources state that he was born on February 7, while others state that he was born on February 27 1856.) Farmington, Utah, U.S.
- Died: 7 October 1937 (aged 81) Juanita Beach, Washington, U.S.
- Resting place: Washelli Cemetery, Seattle.
- Party: Republican
- Spouse: Alice McBride (married in 1884 – 1925)
- Children: 2
- Education: Trinity College, Hartford, Connecticut; Hobart College, New York

Henry McBride (February 7, 1856 – October 7, 1937) was an American politician who served as the fourth lieutenant governor of Washington from 1900 to 1901 and as the fourth governor of Washington from 1901 to 1905.

McBride came to Washington State in 1882. He worked as a teacher while studying law, and was admitted to the bar in 1884 in La Conner, Washington. In 1888, he became the Republican candidate for and was elected to the position of Prosecuting Attorney for Skagit, Whatcom, and Snohomish counties. In 1891, he became the first Superior Judge for the newly established judicial district of Skagit and Island counties. He ran for re-election in 1896, but, like every Republican candidate that year, was defeated by a candidate from the Fusionists party (a combination of Populists, Democrats, and Silver Republicans).

McBride was elected lieutenant-governor in 1900, but didn't finish his term as he became governor after the death of Governor Rogers in 1901. McBride was the first Washington State governor born in the west, the first candidate to become governor as a result of the previous office-holder's death, and the first to succeed to the position from the lieutenant-governor office. From the beginning, McBride promoted the establishment of the State Railroad Commission and new railroad regulations. He advocated for the separation of politics from institutions' activity, in particular decreasing the railroads' monopolistic practices in the Legislature. This placed him in strong opposition to the railroad lobbyists who effectively controlled the Legislature and political parties. The outcome of McBride's confrontation with the railroads was mixed. On one hand, the lobbyists successfully prevented McBride's re-election in 1904. On the other hand, eventually the commission was established and the Legislature cleared of powerful railroad lobbies. McBride ran for governor again in 1908 and 1916, but wasn't re-elected.

As his political influence dwindled, McBride kept following political events and supported the Republican party, but decided to pursue a career in banking and law in Seattle. He was a partner in the law firm McBride, Stratton & Dalton, until he left it to become a labor conciliator. In later years and until his retirement, McBride was president of the Provident Savings & Loan Association, which he co-founded with Herbert S. Conner.

== Early life and family ==
Henry McBride was born in February 1856, in Farmington, Utah. His parents were Ruth Ann Miller, born in Indiana, and George McBride, born in New York. McBride's ancestors were from Scotland and Ireland on his father's side, and England on his mother's side.

In 1858, McBride's father was killed by Shoshonee Indians at Fort Lemhi, Idaho. Many of the attacking Indians lived around the Fort and "had previously been very friendly." A member of Governor Stevens' surveying party fought with the natives.

After his father's death, McBride lived with his mother, who lived to be at least seventy years old. McBride's family was known for longevity; his maternal grandmother reached at least one hundred years old.

== Education ==
McBride began his education in the public schools of Utah, and attended an Episcopalian high school in Logan. He wanted to pursue a career in Episcopal ministry, so he went to study in the preparatory school in Trinity College, located in Hartford, Connecticut. He planned to attend Episcopalian theological school after that.

At Trinity College, McBride contracted malaria, becoming a "physical wreck," and was later transferred to Hobart College in New York, another Episcopalian institution. McBride's health failed during his time in New York. The president of Hobart College suggested McBride had less than a year to live, and advised him to return home to the west.

Eventually, McBride left Hobart College and returned home. In 1880, he moved to California, where he spent two years recuperating.

In 1882, McBride moved to Washington Territory. He wanted to start career in law, and went to La Conner (at the time the county seat of Skagit County) to pursue better educational opportunities. He had been learning law for three years.

== Teaching and legal career ==
=== Teaching and becoming a lawyer (1882–1884) ===
Coming to Washington, McBride was "literally fighting for existence" until he passed a teacher's examination and started teaching in Oak Harbor on Whidbey Island. There, he also worked as an operator in a telegraph office. Later, McBride moved from Island to Skagit County, settling in La Conner and becoming a school teacher there. He spent three years combining teaching with his study of the law. As an educator, McBride was a member of the examining board during the first teachers' examination held in Skagit County.

In 1884, McBride was admitted to the bar in La Conner by Territorial Judge Roger S. Greene. McBride entered the practice alongside older specialists, whose "reputation and patronage were already assured," and received essential experience and skills in the field.

=== Legal career in 1886–1896 ===
In 1886, McBride was a nominee for the position of Probate Judge in Skagit County on a Republican ticket, but he lost the election to Democrat Harrison Clothier. McBride proceeded with his legal practice, and the following year moved to Mount Vernon to partner with E. M. Carr and Harold Preston, co-owners of a law firm in Seattle. For two years, he handled the firm's branch office in Mount Vernon. After two years, the partnership ended and the firm was dissolved.

In 1888, McBride became Prosecuting Attorney for Skagit, Whatcom, and Snohomish Counties, serving at the position for one term.

In 1891, McBride became one of the charter members for the newly established Bar Association of Skagit County. That year, the Superior Court of the new judicial district for Skagit and Island Counties was formed, and McBride was appointed to become its first Superior Judge.

He was first appointed to the office on March 10, 1891, to work until 1892 as a substitute for Judge Winn, who was transferred to Whatcom County. At the end of this term, McBride travelled around the counties on a bicycle, campaigning for re-election. He was re-elected for the full term of four years and stayed in the office until 1896.

At the end of his four-year term as Superior Judge, McBride ran for re-election on the Republican ticket, but was defeated, as was every other Republican nominee that year, due to the "fusion" between the Populists, Democrats and Silver Republicans, who "swept the county" that year. After McBride left the Superior Court, he dedicated his time to practicing law in Mount Vernon.

Over the years, McBride gained recognition on the state level due to his part in a number of important court proceedings and sensational murder cases.

== Career in politics ==
=== Early political activity ===
From the start of his legal career, McBride lead an active political life. He was a member of the Republican party, attending party conventions and promoting the party. By 1888, he became a "recognized leader" in political circles of Washington State.

In 1884, McBride was a member of the Republican Central Committee. That year, the towns of La Conner and Mount Vernon competed to become the county seat of Skagit County, and McBride took an active part in the event. He personally rode to Sedro-Woolley to prevent potential voter fraud there in favor of Mount Vernon. Nevertheless, Mount Vernon received the majority of votes to become the county seat instead of La Conner, which had played the role of temporary county seat.

In 1898, McBride became a chairman of the Republican County Central Committee. He was in charge of a county campaign, and his work was esteemed as "well planned and efficiently carried." That year, the campaign resulted in the victory of the entire Republican ticket.

=== Lieutenant-governor and becoming governor (1900–1901) ===
In 1900, McBride became a Skagit County nominee for governor of Washington State. However, at the party convention, it was decided to make John M. Frink a governor candidate instead, and McBride was up for the lieutenant-governor. McBride received public support and won the election by a vast majority of votes.

Prior to 1900, all state offices were under control of Populists, Democrats, and Silver Republicans elected in 1896. However, the picture changed completely: in 1900, members of the Republican ticket won every office except for the governor. Governor Rogers was the only Democratic candidate to succeed. His victory was a surprise for Republicans, especially after the "upsurge" of their party at the 1898 elections.

Governor Rogers died within a year, on December 26, 1901. By constitutional rule, McBride was appointed in his place, becoming the 4th Washington State governor. He didn't find out about his appointment right away due to a storm that broke down communications.

McBride officially started his governor term in January 1902, giving the Republican party full control of official positions for the 1901–1905 term.

=== Governorship (1901–1905) ===
McBride was the first governor of Washington State, born in the U.S. west, the first who succeeded to the office from the position of the lieutenant-governor, and the first man in Washington State to become governor as a result of the death of the previous office-holder.

Starting his term as governor, McBride believed the Legislature was throttled by "certain interests" and that "business meddled too much with politics." His aim was to defeat the lobbyists' "death grip on the Legislature." His other interest was the demarcation of educational institutions from politics, but he was mostly known as the "recognized leader" fighting against the railroad monopoly and supporting the railroad reform. In this he followed in the footsteps of his former law partner, Harold Preston, who advocated for the new railroad regulations between 1887 and 1901.

==== Railroad Commission promotion (1901–1903) ====
In the 1890s, the question of regulating the railroads was raised by many politicians, but was seen as a "revolt against the established order." By the time McBride became governor, a number of railroad companies operated in the state and competed to dominate the state government. Railroad control of the Legislature became one of the biggest political issues of that time, and McBride was in active opposition to it. He started to promote the establishment of the State Railroad Commission, claiming it was his "first priority." Despite the fact that Democrats as well as Republicans supported the creation of the commission at first, the opposition, led by powerful railroad lobbyists and influential politicians, "restrained" the Legislature from any action in regard to it. Legislature failed to pass a number of commission bills, and some "questionable rulings in favor of the anti-commission" were met with near-riots.

McBride's campaign against the railroad lobby caused the most notable gathering of "famous transportation chiefs" in the history of the inland Northwest on August 4, 1902. The meeting discussed softening McBride's hit on the railroad lobby and soothing "people's clamor" in regard to regulating common carriers. McBride hoped to persuade the Republican state convention in September 1902 to accept the Railroad Commission and create it in 1903; the subject was a "notable plank" in the Republican platform of that year. However, that campaign promise disappeared from the official committee report presented at the convention, and was replaced by one in favor of "equitable railroad legislation."

McBride kept promoting the state regulation and separation of railroads from politics. His stance at the Legislature convention of 1903 was described as "resolute and uncompromising." He was ready for a strong confrontation and built his campaign for the Railroad Commission thoroughly. He convinced many delegations of the necessity of the commission, drew public attention to the railroad's "brazen interference with politics," and spurred public resentment towards it. McBride was present at every convention to defend his idea and to build and discuss strategy in regard to the commission. The Legislature didn't go through with the commission in 1903, as McBride wanted. Eventually, the railroads agreed to establish the commission but postponed it until the next year's legislative session. McBride was considered a winner in the fight for the commission. The entire campaign was called the "hardest floor battle" the Republicans were a part of in a decade.

==== 1904 campaign and defeat ====
McBride decided to "take the issue to the people," building his 1904 electoral campaign around the question of railroad regulation and the commission making it the main controversy of that year's election.

In the beginning of the campaign, McBride gained strong support as a candidate for governor. His candidacy was supported by the majority of Washington State Republicans, especially in eastern Washington, where organizations came out strongly in favor of him.

Several railroads that operated in Washington State and their lobbies were still tightly connected to the state politics and had a strong influence on it. They "controlled" the Republican party, were in opposition to McBride, and planned to remove him from politics by nominating their own Republican candidate and writing the platform. McBride's opposition controlled the majority of the votes in several Washington counties and encouraged western counties to give up on McBride's candidacy and come up with others. McBride was supported by the majority of counties, but fewer votes.

Trying to win over some votes and break up the railroad's agreements in the west, McBride's steering committee tried to make a deal with the King County delegation. J. D. Farrell, vice president of the Great Northern Railway, spokesman for railroad political interests, and one of the men leading the anti-McBride's campaigns, found out about the deal and rushed to the Tacoma convention to veto it.

The day after Farrell's arrival, the convention was held, McBride's nomination for governor was rejected, and Whatcom lawyer Albert E. Mead was nominated instead, subsequently becoming the new governor of Washington State. That year, all of the Republican state ticket won to make up the new Legislature.

==== The outcome of Governor McBride's official term ====
During the election of 1904, Albert E. Mead answered the Democratic party's demand for the Railroad Commission, stating he was ready to approve it if the Legislature passed it. At the same time, immediately after McBride's defeat, the railroads agreed to accept the Railroad Commission and keep their lobbying away from the Legislature in Olympia.

In early 1905, Mead proceeded to create the commission, but it wasn't based on McBride's ideas and was mainly aimed in the railroads' favor. Although McBride didn't achieve his main goal during his official term, the railroads finally took a step back, gave up their Legislature lobbyists, and accepted the Railroad Commission. For years afterwards, it was considered the strongest organized lobby to exist in the state.

Afterwards, the Railroad Commission duties were re-appointed to the Board of Public Works, which had authority not only over railroads, but over all corporations providing public service. Later, the responsibility was moved to the State Department of Public Service.

During McBride's official service, Prosser, founder of Washington State Historical Society, described him as a "painstaking and careful" governor who concentrated all of his abilities "in behalf of the state." Years after McBride's governorship, he was considered "one of the most independent, honestly self-sufficient figures in the political history of the state" not only a Washington State pioneer but a "pioneer in progressive Republican leadership."

==== Other activity as governor ====
On July 4, 1902, the keel was laid for the first Washington-built battleship, the USS Nebraska, and a special ceremony was held to celebrate the event. McBride attended the ceremony with Governor Savage of Nebraska. Both governors made speeches and drove the first rivet into the ship's keel. The ship, built by the Moran Brothers shipyard in Seattle, Washington, was launched on October 7, 1904. It later became part of the Great White Fleet and the Pacific Fleet, and served during World War I.

For years, the Washington State Good Roads Association has been lobbying to improve and expand the state's highways. In 1903, the Legislature was finally convinced to pass House Substitute Bill No. 30, Providing for the Establishment and Repair of Certain State Roads. On March 21, 1903, Governor McBride vetoed a vast array of appropriations, including Bill No. 30, due to the fact that their costs significantly exceeded provided funds. McBride's veto of the road bill, as well as a number of other vetoes, were overridden by Governor Mead in 1905. Only two Senators voted in support of McBride's road veto during the 1905 convention.

== Career in later years ==
=== Later political activity ===
Defeated in the 1904 elections, McBride proceeded with his political career and campaigned for re-election as governor in 1908. At the time, he was considered "the leading 'first choice' candidate" for the gubernatorial nomination on the Republican ticket, but eventually was defeated by Samuel G. Cosgrove.

In 1912, McBride presided at the Republican State Convention, which preceded the National Convention in Chicago. There were two conventions held in Aberdeen; McBride took part in the one supporting Theodore Roosevelt's candidacy over William Howard Taft's in the presidential election.

In 1916, McBride became a nominee for governor elections, but was defeated by his opponent, Democrat Ernest Lister. McBride called the direct primary elections of that time "the cause of all that is wrong in politics" and "the cause of public overspending." He was against the new governor, calling him an "inferior type of man," and complained about the deterioration of the political and electoral situation with the creation of the new direct primary system.

In later years, McBride continued to closely follow political events and actively support the Republican party, despite the New Deal's influence on it.

=== Later career in banking, law and timber businesses ===
In 1907, McBride became president of the Lake Goodwin Shingle Mill Company in Snohomish County.

Although McBride was still active politically, between 1913 and 1918 he also became recognized in Seattle banking and law circles. He worked with W. B. Stratton and Charley Dalton in a law firm named McBride, Stratton & Dalton. At the beginning of World War I, McBride left his law practice to become a Pacific Coast labor conciliator.

In later years, McBride entered the lumber business once more to manufacture shingles and lumber. He partnered with Herbert S. Conner to open their own enterprise. They left the business after some time and founded the Provident Savings & Loan Association in Seattle, where McBride served as president.

Although McBride officially retired from business by 1933, he still regularly attended shareholder meetings of the Provident Savings & Loan Association. Around 1935, McBride started to withdraw from his remaining duties due to failing health.

== Other activity ==
McBride was one of the main stockholders of the La Conner Water Works Company, which managed all the water works of La Conner.

From 1885 to 1887, McBride became co-editor and manager of the Puget Sound Mail. It was the oldest newspaper in western Washington publishing first on July 5, 1873, under the name Bellingham Bay Mail. Its office was originally situated in Whatcom (Bellingham), but later moved to La Conner. In 1891, McBride was publisher for the Birdsview Bell newspaper, which quickly closed. In 1902, McBride became a co-owner of the Republican newspaper. Its first issue was published under the name of Wenatchee Republican on September 8, 1898, and it changed owners a number of times both before and after McBride's ownership.

== Personal life ==
McBride married Alice Marie Garrett on February 7, 1884, in La Conner, Washington. Alice was born in Coupeville, Washington, on February 27, 1864. Her father was an Englishman known as a "prominent pioneer" of Island County. While McBride became the first governor of Washington State who was born in west, Alice was the first Washington-born First Lady.

The McBrides had 2 children. They were both members of the Episcopal Church.

Alice McBride died on August 15, 1925, in the family home in Seattle. Her body was entombed in Washelli Mausoleum.

After his wife's death and his own retirement, McBride moved to Kirkland, Washington. He spent his later years living with his friends, the Bouchard family, on their ranch at Juanita Beach (or Juanita Point) near Lake Washington. The most exercise he did at the time, in his own words, were walks with his three collies: Laddie, Bonnie, and Sandy.

=== Hobbies and memberships ===
As bicycles became popular, McBride used to ride from town to town campaigning and for personal pleasure. In his own words, he used to leave the court where he worked "at 4 o'clock in the afternoon and ride 50 miles before dinner." Among his other interests was fishing. McBride used to get up at 3 o'clock in the morning to ride with a friend to fish for trout.

McBride was a member of a number of popular fraternities and organizations, including the Masonic fraternity, the Independent Order of Odd Fellows, and the Benevolent and Protective Order of Elks.

== Death and heritage ==
After a long illness, McBride died on October 7, 1937, near Juanita, where he lived for the last eleven years of his life. His last request was to be buried near his wife in Washelli Cemetery in Seattle.

McBride's funeral was held on October 11, 1937, in Sessions Mortuary in Kirkland. His funeral was attended by many of his friends, colleagues, and acquaintances, including the only surviving former Washington State governor at the time, Roland Hartley, and McBride's former colleague, Harold Preston, founder of the Preston Gates & Ellis law firm.

At the time of his death, McBride had an estate valued at $11,000 ($203,000 in 2020 dollars (Note: The approximate value converted to 2020 dollars, based on a standard adjustment of the 1913 dollar value using the Consumer Price Index as calculated by United States Department of Labor.)). In his will, McBride left $7,500 ($138,000) to the Bouchard family, with whom he lived for the last years of his life. His will also mentioned two of his sisters-in-law, his brother William, and his niece, Alys Garret.

== See also ==
- List of governors of Washington
- Lieutenant Governor of Washington
- John Rankin Rogers
- Albert E. Mead
- Samuel G. Cosgrove
- Ernest Lister

== Literature cited ==
- "CPI Inflation Calculator", Bureau of Labor Statistics, Washington: United States Department of Labor
- Carrington, Albert, ed. (March 17, 1858), "Indian Outrage", Deseret News, Salt Lake City: The Church of Jesus Christ of Latter-day Saints, p. 5, ISSN 2638-4841, LCCN sn83045554, OCLC 7004918
- Blethen, Alden J., ed. (June 12, 1900), "Wants lieutenant-governorship", Seattle Daily Times, Seattle: The Seattle Times Company, p. 4, ISSN 2639-4898, LCCN sn86072007, OCLC 1765328
- Wilhelm, Honor L., ed. (October 1, 1902), "Chelan County, Washington", The Coast, vol. IV, no. 3, Seattle: The Metropolitan Press, Inc., pp. 121–126, LCCN 05032197, OCLC 890484899
- Men of the Pacific coast: containing portraits and biographies of the professional, financial and business men of California, Oregon and Washington (PDF), San Francisco: Pacific Art Company, 1903, OCLC 16691779
- Shiach, William Sidney; Averill, Harrison B., eds. (1904), An Illustrated History of Klickitat, Yakima and Kittitas counties (PDF), Chicago: Interstate publishing company, LCCN 04037127, OCLC 2097023
- An Illustrated History of Skagit and Snohomish Counties: their people, their commerce and their resources, with an outline of the early history of the state of Washington (PDF), Chicago: Interstate Publishing Company, 1906, LCCN 06030900, OCLC 11299996
- White, James Terry, ed. (1917), "Henry McBride", The National cyclopædia of American biography, vol. XIV, New York: James T. White & Company, p. 447, LCCN 86643436, OCLC 2510562
- "Ex-governor McBride's wife dies at home here", Seattle Daily Times, Seattle: The Seattle Times Company, p. 2, August 17, 1925, ISSN 2639-4898, LCCN sn86072007, OCLC 1765328
- "Ex-Governors: Henry McBride remains optimist", Seattle Daily Times, Seattle: The Seattle Times Company, p. 18, January 22, 1933, ISSN 2639-4898, LCCN sn86072007, OCLC 1765328
- "Gov. McBride, at 80, refuses to let new deal bother", Seattle Daily Times, Seattle: The Seattle Times Company, pp. 1, 2, February 27, 1936, ISSN 2639-4898, LCCN sn86072007, OCLC 1765328
- "Ex-governor Henry McBride is dead after noted career", Seattle Daily Times, Seattle: The Seattle Times Company, p. 1, October 7, 1937, ISSN 2639-4898, LCCN sn86072007, OCLC 1765328
- "Former governor taken by death", Spokane Chronicle, Spokane: Cowles Company, p. 25, October 7, 1937, LCCN sn86072020, OCLC 14374699
- "Death claims Henry M'Bride, ex-governor", Seattle Post-Intelligencer, Seattle: Leigh S. J. Hunt, p. 11, October 8, 1937, ISSN 0745-970X, LCCN sn83045605, OCLC 3734418
- "H. M'Bride, early governor, dies", The Spokesman-Review, vol. 55, no. 147, Spokane: Cowles Company, pp. 1, 2, October 8, 1937, ISSN 1064-7317, LCCN sn84024754, OCLC 11102610
- "M'Bride rites to be tomorrow", Seattle Daily Times, Seattle: The Seattle Times Company, p. 33, October 10, 1937, ISSN 2639-4898, LCCN sn86072007, OCLC 1765328
- "Ex-gov. M'Bride funeral today", The Spokesman-Review, Spokane: Cowles Company, p. 5, October 11, 1937, ISSN 1064-7317, LCCN sn84024754, OCLC 11102610
- "M'Bride estate goes to friends", Seattle Daily Times, Seattle: The Seattle Times Company, p. 8, October 17, 1937, ISSN 2639-4898, LCCN sn86072007, OCLC 1765328
- "Harold Preston, dean of bar, dead of stroke", Seattle Daily Times, Seattle: The Seattle Times Company, pp. 1, 2, January 1, 1938, ISSN 2639-4898, LCCN sn86072007, OCLC 1765328
- "Pioneer state lawmaker dies", The Spokesman-Review, Spokane: Cowles Company, p. 17, January 28, 1947, ISSN 1064-7317, LCCN sn84024754, OCLC 11102610
- "Lawyer from Utah chief in Washington", Spokane Chronicle, Spokane: Cowles Company, p. 4, June 10, 1963, LCCN sn86072020, OCLC 14374699
- "People in history: Henry McBride - 1856-1915", Longview Daily News, Longview: Westmedia Corp., p. 4, June 13, 1963, ISSN 0889-0005, OCLC 13781223
- Brazier, Don (2000), History of the Washington Legislature, 1854-1963, Olympia: Washington State Senate, LCCN 00329677, OCLC 45163476
- Conover, C. T. (April 29, 1957), "Just cogitating: Henry McBride had active political career", Seattle Daily Times, Seattle: The Seattle Times Company, p. 26, ISSN 2639-4898, LCCN sn86072007, OCLC 1765328
- Conover, C. T. (June 20, 1960), "Just cogitating: Harold Preston authored employer's liability statute", Seattle Daily Times, Seattle: The Seattle Times Company, p. 41, ISSN 2639-4898, LCCN sn86072007, OCLC 1765328
- Conover, C. T. (April 30, 1961), "Just cogitating: Harold Preston stood high in public esteem", Seattle Daily Times, Seattle: The Seattle Times Company, p. 98, ISSN 2639-4898, LCCN sn86072007, OCLC 1765328
- Durham, Nelson Wayne (1912), History of the City of Spokane and Spokane Country, Washington: From its earliest settlement to the present time, Library of American civilization, Chicago: The S. J. Clarke publishing company, LCCN 14013593, OCLC 11041789
- Evans, Walter (April 18, 1976), "Made in Seattle: the mighty USS Nebraska", Seattle Post-Intelligencer, Seattle: Leigh S. J. Hunt, pp. 7, 8, 10, ISSN 0745-970X, LCCN sn83045605, OCLC 3734418
- Hanify, Mary Lou (August 21, 1966), "Washington state's fourth first lady", Seattle Daily Times, Seattle: The Seattle Times Company, p. 4, ISSN 2639-4898, LCCN sn86072007, OCLC 1765328
- Hunt, Herbert; Kaylor, Floyd C. (1917), Washington, west of the Cascades; historical and descriptive; the explorers, the Indians, the pioneers, the modern, Chicago: S. J. Clarke Publishing Company, LCCN 18015511, OCLC 10086413
- Meany, Edmond S. (1909), History of the state of Washington (PDF), New York: The MacMillan company, LCCN 09013526, OCLC 36322483
- Meany, Edmond S. (1915), Governors of Washington, territorial and state (PDF), Seattle: Department of Printing, University of Washington, LCCN 16015657, OCLC 13072753
- Murray, Keith A. (April 1, 1947), Gates, Charles M. (ed.), "The Aberdeen Convention of 1912", Pacific Northwest Quarterly, XXXVIII (2), Seattle: University of Washington: 99–108, ISSN 0030-8803, JSTOR 41441240, LCCN 08030966, OCLC 2392232
- Oldham, Kit (March 10, 2005), Rousso, Nick (ed.), "Governor Albert E. Mead signs House Sub. Bill No. 25, creating the office of Highway Commissioner on March 13, 1905", historylink.org, Seattle: HistoryLink, OCLC 124224498
- Prosser, William Farrand (1903), Lewis, Edward Gardner (ed.), A history of the Puget Sound country, its resources, its commerce and its people, New York City: Edward Gardner Lewis, LCCN 05013767
- Steele, Richard F. (1904), Illustrated history of Stevens, Ferry, Okanogan and Chelan counties, Spokane: Western Historical Publishing Company, OCLC 6998253514
- Tewkesbury, Don (October 18, 1928a), "State campaigns of yesterday: Personality shatters party lines", Seattle Daily Times, Seattle: The Seattle Times Company, p. 6, ISSN 2639-4898, LCCN sn86072007, OCLC 1765328
- Tewkesbury, Don (October 19, 1928b), "State campaigns of yesterday: Demise of the railroad lobby", Seattle Daily Times, Seattle: The Seattle Times Company, p. 6, ISSN 2639-4898, LCCN sn86072007, OCLC 1765328
- Thorson, Winston B. (April 1, 1944), Gates, Charles M. (ed.), "Washington State Nominating Conventions", Pacific Northwest Quarterly, 35 (2), Seattle: University of Washington: 99–119, ISSN 0030-8803, JSTOR 40487589, OCLC 2392232
- Wood, James A. (October 8, 1937), "Speaking for the Times", Seattle Daily Times, Seattle: The Seattle Times Company, p. 6, ISSN 2639-4898, LCCN sn86072007, OCLC 1765328
- Wood, James A. (March 14, 1943b), "When a railroad man came to the G. O. P. convention", Seattle Daily Times, Seattle: The Seattle Times Company, p. 16, ISSN 2639-4898, LCCN sn86072007, OCLC 1765328
- Wood, James A. (March 21, 1943a), "Freedom from want didn't stop John L. from waiting", Seattle Daily Times, Seattle: The Seattle Times Company, p. 22, ISSN 2639-4898, LCCN sn86072007, OCLC 1765328

Party political offices
Preceded by Marion E. Hay	Republican nominee for Governor of Washington; 1916	Succeeded by Louis F. Hart
Political offices
Preceded by Thurston Daniels	Lieutenant Governor of Washington; 1901	Succeeded by Charles E. Coon
Preceded by John Rogers	Governor of Washington; 1901–1905	Succeeded by Albert E. Mead
