= Louis F. Hart =

9th governor of Washington

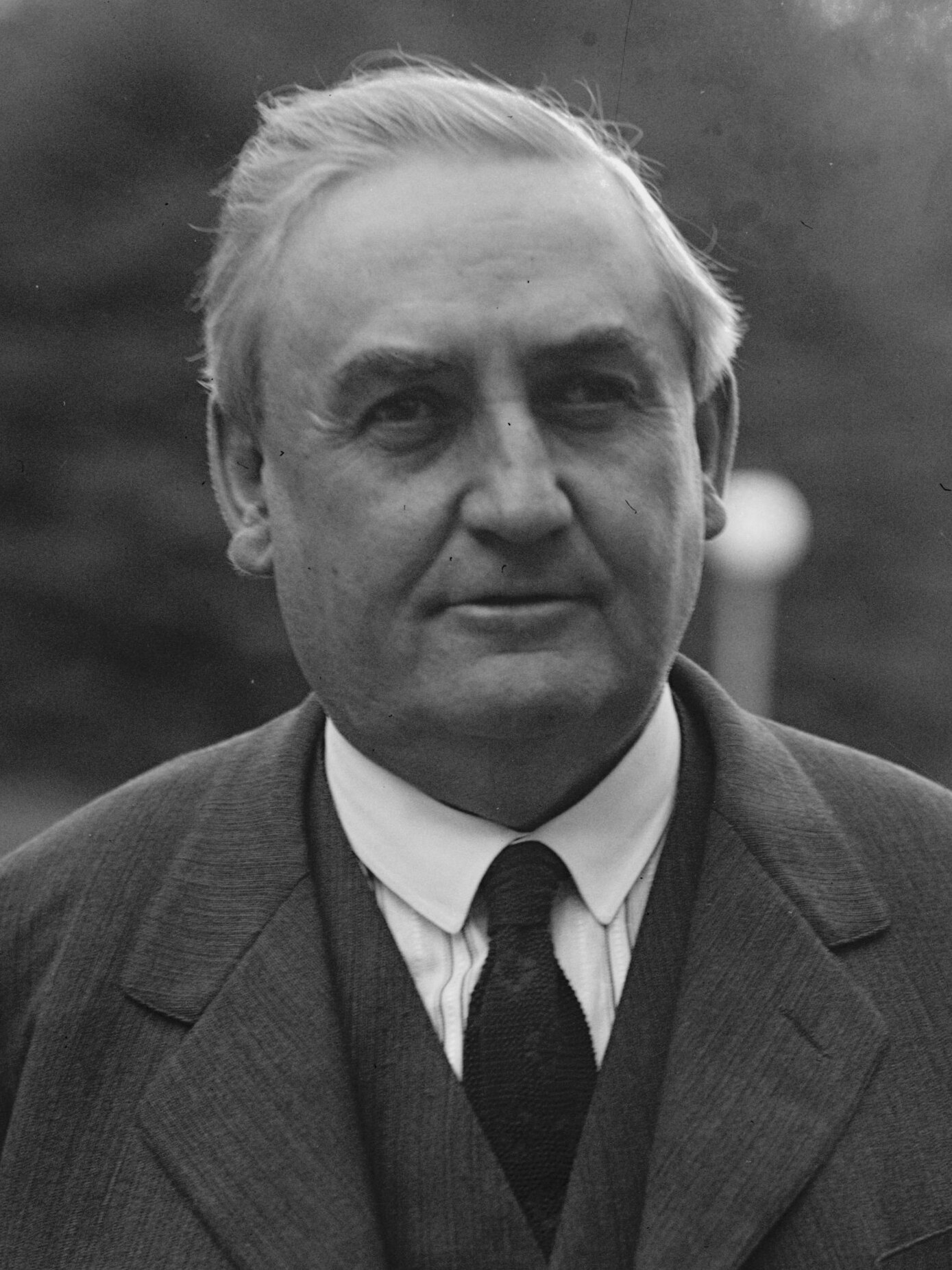
- Hart in 1923

9th Governor of Washington
- In office February 13, 1919 – January 14, 1925
- Lieutenant: William J. Coyle
- Preceded by: Ernest Lister
- Succeeded by: Roland H. Hartley

7th Lieutenant Governor of Washington
- In office January 15, 1913 – February 13, 1919
- Governor: Ernest Lister
- Preceded by: Marion E. Hay
- Succeeded by: William J. Coyle

Personal details
- Born: Louis Folwell Hart; 4 January 1862 High Point, Missouri, U.S.
- Died: 4 December 1929 (aged 67) Tacoma, Washington, U.S.

Louis Folwell Hart (4 January 1862 – 4 December 1929) was an American politician who served as the seventh lieutenant governor of Washington from 1913 to 1919 and as the ninth governor of Washington from 1919 to 1925. He was a Republican. He reorganized the state's administrative structure by reducing the number of agencies and the consequent financial economies.

== Biography ==
Hart was born in High Point, Missouri and studied law in Missouri. He married Ella James on 9 February 1881 in Missouri and over the course of years they had five children, three sons and two daughters,

== Career ==
Lured by the frontier, Hart and his wife moved to Snohomish, Washington in the late 1880s, where he practiced law. In 1899 they moved to Tacoma where he continued to practice law and was an insurance agent.

Winning the Republican nomination in 1912, Hart was elected as Washington's seventh Lieutenant Governor and he was reelected in 1916.

During World War I Hart served as chairman of the Selective Service Appeals Board for Southwest Washington. Hart became governor when the then-governor Ernest Lister retired in 1919 due to failing health.

Hart was elected governor in his own right in 1920. Hart was instrumental in getting new road projects through the state legislature and strongly supported the creation of a state highway patrol. He oversaw the construction of a new State Capitol complex. Perhaps his greatest accomplishment was reorganizing the state's administrative structure, reducing the number of administrative agencies from 75 to 10.

In 1921, Hart signed the Alien Land Bill, which barred non-white immigrants from buying, owning, or leasing land in the state, and mandated confiscation without compensation of lands purchased before or after passage of the act. The law was targeted primarily against Asian Americans.

He did not have a Lieutenant Governor from his election as governor until William J. Coyle was appointed to the office in 1921. He is the last governor of the state, to date, that did not have a Lieutenant Governor at any time during his governorship.

Hart did not run for reelection in 1924, but instead retired to Tacoma where he practiced law, and served as the president of the State Good Roads Association.

== Death ==
Hart died on 4 December 1929, in Tacoma, Washington. He is interred at Masonic Memorial Park, Tumwater, Washington.

Party political offices
Preceded by Henry McBride	Republican nominee for Governor of Washington; 1920	Succeeded by Roland H. Hartley
Political offices
Preceded by Marion E. Hay	Lieutenant Governor of Washington; 1913–1919	Succeeded by William J. Coyle
Preceded by Ernest Lister	Governor of Washington; 1919–1925	Succeeded by Roland H. Hartley
