= Marion E. Hay =

7th governor of Washington

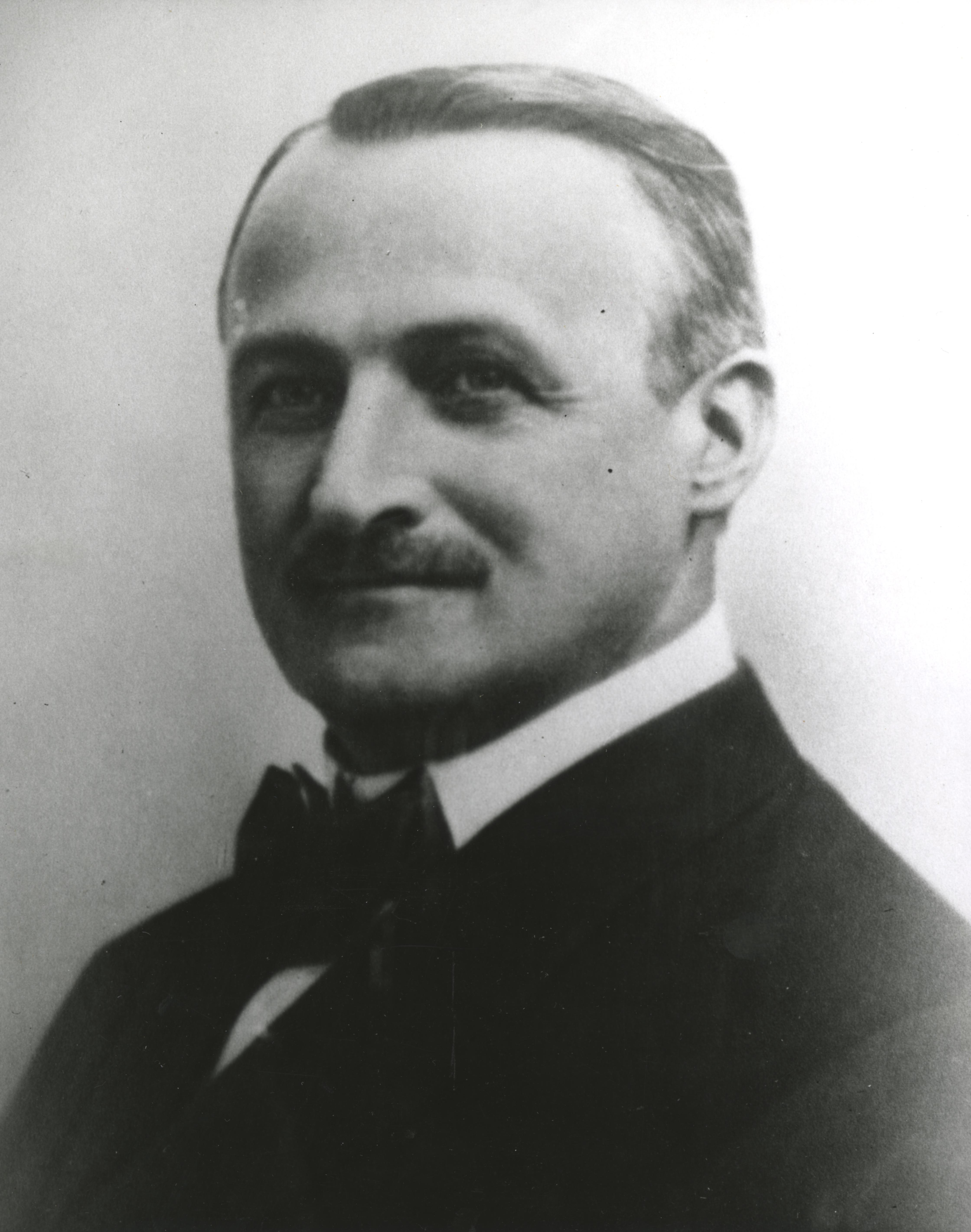
- Hay c. 1909

7th Governor of Washington
- In office March 28, 1909 – January 15, 1913
- Lieutenant: Vacant
- Preceded by: Samuel G. Cosgrove
- Succeeded by: Ernest Lister

6th Lieutenant Governor of Washington
- In office January 27, 1909 – March 28, 1909
- Governor: Samuel G. Cosgrove
- Preceded by: Charles E. Coon
- Succeeded by: Louis F. Hart

Personal details
- Born: December 8, 1865 Adams County, Wisconsin, U.S.
- Died: November 21, 1933 (aged 67) Spokane, Washington, U.S.
- Party: Republican
- Spouse: Lizzie L. Muir

Marion E. Hay (December 8, 1865 – November 21, 1933) was an American politician who served as the seventh governor of Washington from 1909 to 1913.

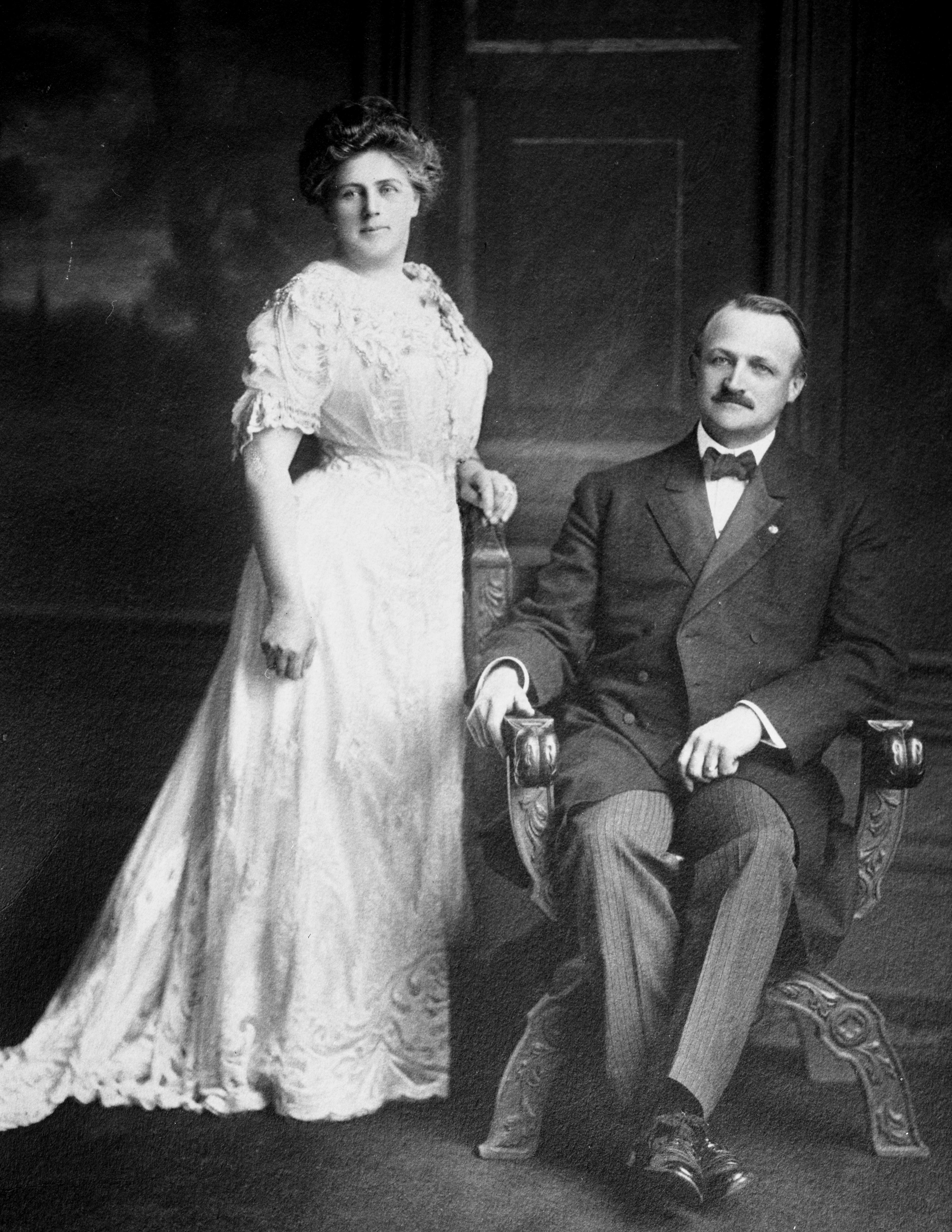
Governor Hay and his wife Lizzie Muir, circa 1909.

== Biography ==
Born in Adams County, Wisconsin, Hay attended the Bayless Commercial Business College in Dubuque, Iowa. He married Lizzie L. Muir in Jackson on January 16, 1887, and they had six children, Raymond M., Moon M., Edward M., Bruce M., Rance M., Katherine J., and Margaret E.

== Career ==
Hay moved to Washington Territory in 1888, where he opened a store in Davenport, Washington and owned wheat ranches in eastern Washington and Canada. He moved to Wilbur, Washington in 1889 and served two terms as mayor of Wilbur from 1898 to 1902, as well as chairman of the Lincoln County Republican Party, and was an alternate to the Republican National Convention in 1900. He relocated to Spokane, Washington in 1908.

In 1908, Hay was elected as Lieutenant Governor of Washington, and he became Governor upon the death of Samuel G. Cosgrove, after only about two months in office in March 1909. He served the remainder of Cosgrove's unexpired term and left office in 1913. Focusing on corruption in state government, he called a special session of the legislature to investigate and impeach dishonest state officials. During his administration, the Workman's Compensation law and women's suffrage were enacted.

Defeated for election in 1912, he returned to manage his personal business interests and property holdings, and was chairman of the 12th District Regional Agricultural Credit Corporation.

== Death ==
Hay died of a heart attack at his office on November 21, 1933 and is interred at the mausoleum at Riverside Memorial Park, Spokane.

Party political offices
Preceded by Samuel G. Cosgrove	Republican nominee for Governor of Washington; 1912	Succeeded by Henry McBride
Political offices
Preceded by Charles E. Coon	Lieutenant Governor of Washington; 1909	Succeeded by Louis F. Hart
Preceded by Samuel G. Cosgrove	Governor of Washington; 1909–1913	Succeeded by Ernest Lister
