= F. H. Luce =

2nd Lieutenant Governor of Washington

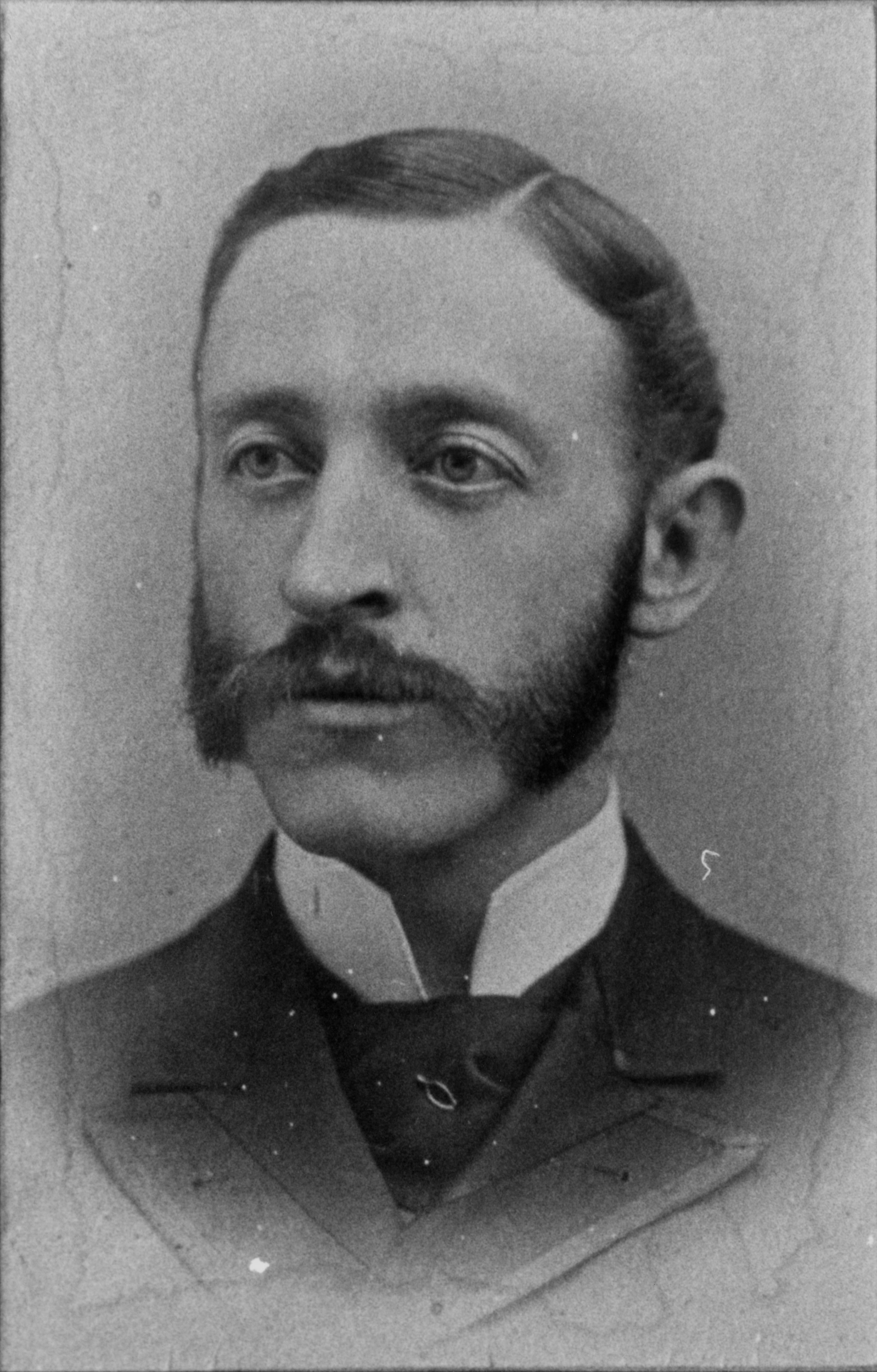
- Luce c. 1893 – c. 1897

2nd Lieutenant Governor of Washington
- In office January 11, 1893 – January 13, 1897
- Governor: John McGraw
- Preceded by: Charles E. Laughton
- Succeeded by: Thurston Daniels

Member of the Washington State Senate from the 1st district
- In office 1891–1893
- Preceded by: Horace E. Houghton
- Succeeded by: Richard A. Hutchinson

Member of the Washington State Senate from the 4th district
- In office 1889–1891
- Preceded by: office created
- Succeeded by: E. B. Hyde

Personal details
- Born: May 23, 1859 Chippewa Falls, Wisconsin, U.S.
- Died: February 1, 1937 (aged 77) Seattle, Washington, U.S.
- Party: Republican

Frank H. Luce (May 23, 1859 – February 1, 1937) was a Republican politician from the U.S. state of Washington. He served as the second Lieutenant Governor of Washington after serving the state senate.

Luce arrived in Washington in 1886, first settling in Tacoma before moving to Davenport in 1888.

He died in Seattle in 1937.

Political offices
Preceded by Charles E. Laughton	Lieutenant Governor of Washington; 1893 – 1897	Succeeded by Thurston Daniels
