= William J. Coyle =

8th Lieutenant Governor of Washington

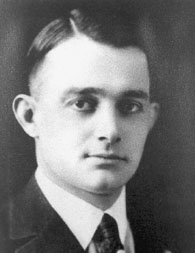

8th Lieutenant Governor of Washington
- In office January 12, 1921 – January 14, 1925
- Governor: Louis F. Hart
- Preceded by: Louis F. Hart
- Succeeded by: W. Lon Johnson

Personal details
- Born: March 18, 1888 Sutter Creek, California, U.S.
- Died: October 1, 1977 (aged 89) Seattle, Washington, U.S.
- Party: Republican

William Jennings "Wee" Coyle (March 18, 1888 – October 1, 1977) was an American politician and college football player and cocah. A Republican, he served as the eighth Lieutenant Governor of Washington, from 1921 to 1925.

As a student at Seattle High School, Coyle was a four-sport varsity athlete in football, track, baseball, and basketball. He was quarterback and captain of the 1906 team that won the Interscholastic Championship of the United States.

While attending the University of Washington, he played on the school's football team as a quarterback. In 1911, he was made team captain. He later served in World War I, receiving a Distinguished Service Cross after being injured in the Meuse–Argonne offensive.

== Head coaching record ==
Year	Team	Overall	Conference	Standing	Bowl/playoffs
Gonzaga Blue and White (Independent) (1915)
1915	Gonzaga	3–3			
Gonzaga:		3–3			
Total:		3–3			

Political offices
Preceded by Louis F. Hart	Lieutenant Governor of Washington; 1921–1925	Succeeded by W. Lon Johnson
