= Thurston Daniels =

3rd Lieutenant Governor of Washington

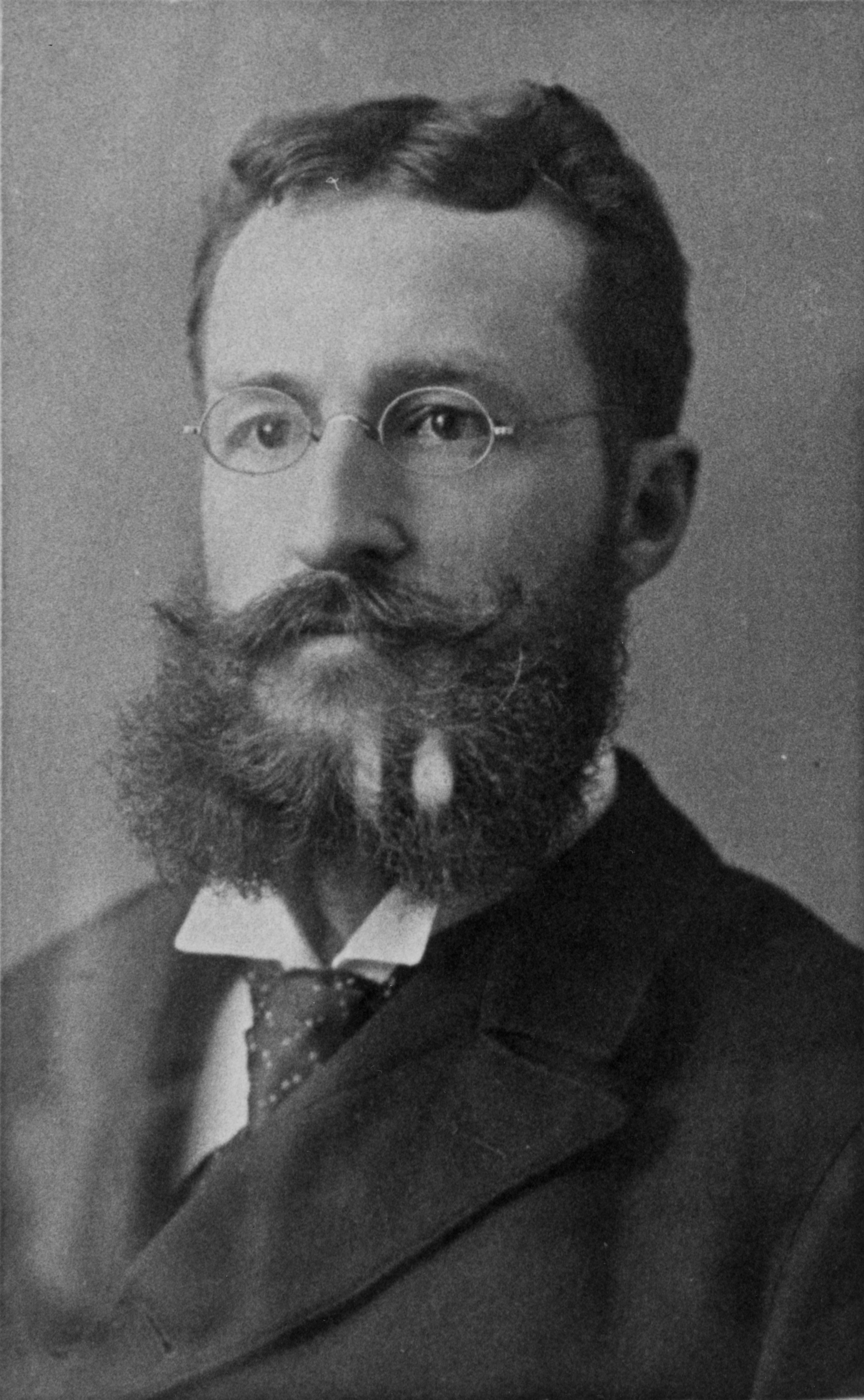

3rd Lieutenant Governor of Washington
- In office January 13, 1897 – January 16, 1901
- Governor: John Rankin Rogers
- Preceded by: F. H. Luce
- Succeeded by: Henry McBride

Personal details
- Born: June 10, 1859 North Yamhill, Oregon, U.S.
- Died: December 8, 1926 (aged 67) Los Angeles, California, U.S.
- Party: Populist

Thurston Edward Daniels (June 10, 1859 – December 8, 1926) was a Populist politician from the U.S. state of Washington. He served as the third Lieutenant Governor of Washington.

Political offices
Preceded by F.H. Luce	Lieutenant Governor of Washington; 1897–1901	Succeeded by Henry McBride
