= Ernest Lister =

8th governor of Washington

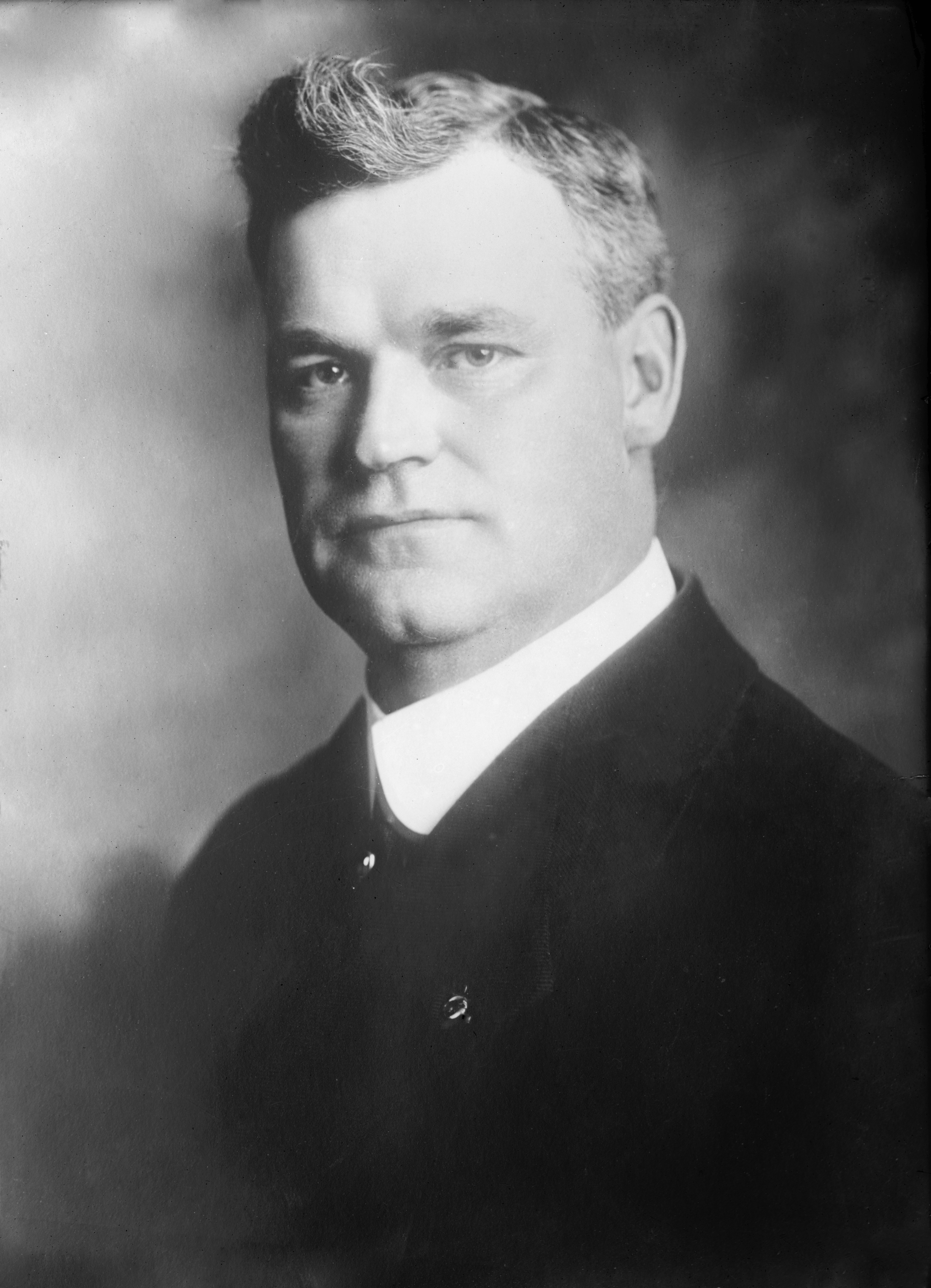

8th Governor of Washington
- In office January 15, 1913 – February 13, 1919
- Lieutenant: Louis F. Hart
- Preceded by: Marion E. Hay
- Succeeded by: Louis F. Hart

Personal details
- Born: June 15, 1870 Halifax, England
- Died: June 14, 1919 (aged 48) Seattle, Washington, U.S.
- Party: Democratic (1901–1919)
- Other political affiliations: Populist (before 1901)
- Spouse: Alma Thornton

Ernest Lister (June 15, 1870 – June 14, 1919) was an American politician who served as the eighth governor of Washington from 1913 to 1919.

== Biography ==
Born in Halifax, England, Lister immigrated with his family in 1884, to be near his uncle, who was mayor of Tacoma, Washington.

== Career ==
Lister began working as an iron-molder in his brother's foundry in Tacoma. He operated a foundry and woodworking shop as well as working in real estate and insurance. He owned Lister Construction Company from 1903 to 1912, and President of Lister Manufacturing Company. He married Mary Alma Thornton on February 28, 1893, and they had two children, Florence and John Ernest. He was elected to the Tacoma City Council in 1894 as a Populist. After a successful management of Governor John Rankin Rogers' campaign in 1896, Lister was appointed chairman of the State Board of Control.

Lister became the only elected Democrat (but the first to be elected outright into the office as a member of that party) in Washington's executive branch of government when he was elected in 1912. He was sworn into the office on January 11, 1913, re-elected in 1916, and remained in it until he became ill during his second term and relinquished his office to the Lieutenant Governor.

As governor, he supported agricultural aid, irrigation and reclamation projects, and state industrial accident insurance. He vetoed legislation that would have denied civil rights to members of the Industrial Workers of the World. And his efforts helped bring the eight-hour work day to the Pacific Northwest.

Other reforms concerning working conditions were carried out during his time as governor.

== Death ==
Lister died one day before his forty-ninth birthday, on June 14, 1919, from heart and kidney disease, in Seattle, Washington. He is interred at Tacoma Cemetery, Tacoma, Washington.

== See also ==
- List of governors of Washington

Party political offices
Preceded by John Pattison	Democratic nominee for Governor of Washington; 1912, 1916	Succeeded by William Wilson Black
Political offices
Preceded by Marion E. Hay	Governor of Washington; 1913–1919	Succeeded by Louis F. Hart
