= Charles E. Coon =

5th Lieutenant Governor of Washington

Charles Edward Coon
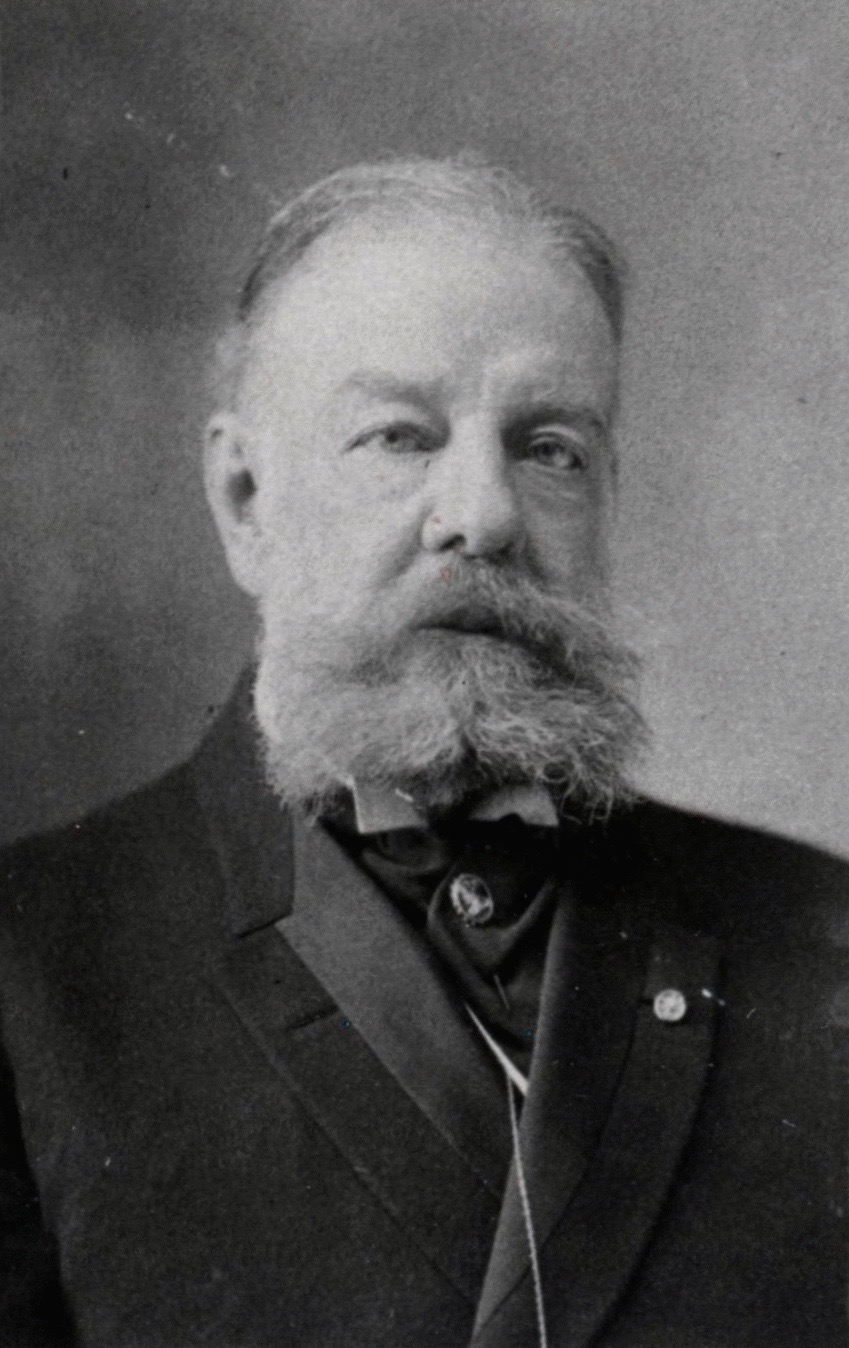
- Coon in 1907

5th Lieutenant Governor of Washington
- In office January 11, 1905 – January 13, 1909
- Governor: Albert E. Mead
- Preceded by: Henry McBride
- Succeeded by: Marion E. Hay

Personal details
- Born: March 15, 1842; Allegany County, New York, U.S.
- Died: August 1, 1920 (aged 78); Port Townsend, Washington, U.S.
- Political party: Republican

Charles Edward Coon (March 15, 1842 – August 1, 1920) was a Republican politician from the U.S. state of Washington. He served as the fifth Lieutenant Governor of Washington.

Political offices
Preceded by Henry McBride	Lieutenant Governor of Washington; 1905–1909	Succeeded by Marion E. Hay
