= John Rankin Rogers =

3rd governor of Washington

John R. Rogers
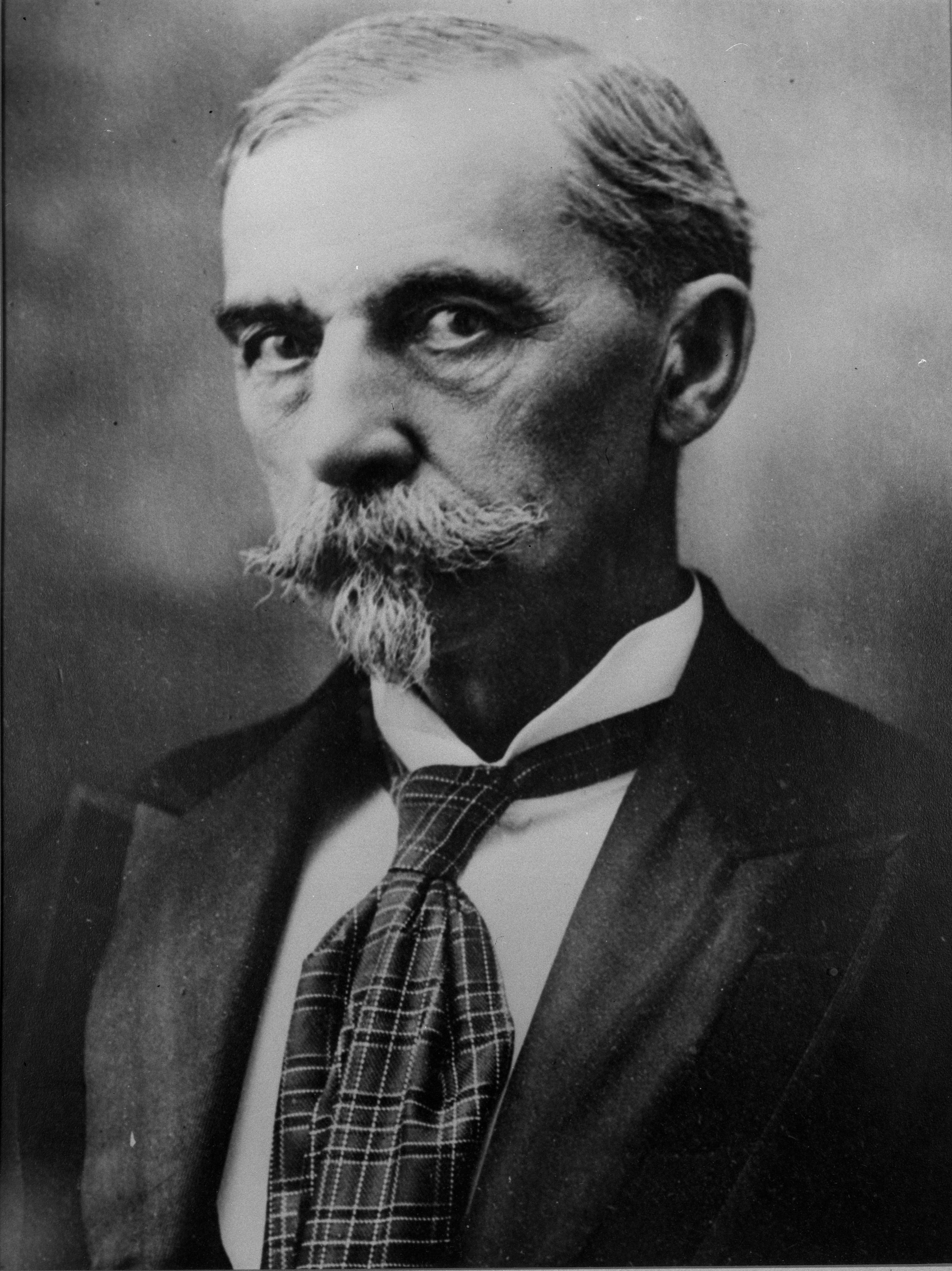
- Rogers c. 1897–1901

3rd Governor of Washington
- In office January 13, 1897 – December 26, 1901
- Lieutenant: Thurston Daniels; Henry McBride
- Preceded by: John H. McGraw
- Succeeded by: Henry McBride

Member of the Washington House of Representatives from the 33rd district
- In office January 14, 1895 – January 11, 1897
- Preceded by: John O. Edwards
- Succeeded by: Joseph C. Kincaid

Personal details
- Born: John Rankin Rogers; September 4, 1838 Brunswick, Maine, U.S.
- Died: December 26, 1901 (aged 63) Olympia, Washington, U.S.
- Party: Democratic (1900–1901)
- Other political affiliations: Populist (until 1900)
- Spouse: Sarah L. Greene (1840–1909)
- Profession: druggist, educator, farmer, politician

John Rankin Rogers (September 4, 1838 – December 26, 1901) was an American politician who served as the third governor of Washington from 1897 to 1901. Elected as a member of the People's Party before switching his affiliation to the Democratic Party, Rogers was elected to two consecutive terms in 1896 and 1900, but died before completing his fifth year in office.

== Biography ==
=== Early years ===
John R. Rogers was born September 4, 1838, in Brunswick, Maine, the son of Margaret Anne (Green) and John Rogers.

Rogers went to Boston as a youth and apprenticed as a druggist, then moved south to Mississippi in 1856 to manage a drug store for four years in Jackson. He moved north to Illinois in 1860, where he farmed and worked as a school teacher and druggist. He married Sarah Greene in 1861 and together they had five children.

In 1876 the family relocated to Kansas to farm and Rogers was later an editor of the Kansas Commoner for several years in Wichita, and was an organizer within the Farmers' Alliance.

Rogers moved to Washington in 1890 and settled in Puyallup, where he operated a drug store, invested in real estate and eventually became involved in local politics.

=== Political career ===
Rogers was elected to the Washington House of Representatives in 1895 as a Populist, and governor the following year. As governor he supported the "Barefoot Schoolboy Act" which he had first sponsored while in the state legislature. The act provided a mechanism of state funding to equalize support for free public education between counties which had a large tax base and those without. Rogers was a conditional supporter of the Single Tax Movement associated with Henry George. He switched his affiliation to the Democratic Party in 1900 (he was the first Democrat to serve as governor; Ernest Lister would be the first politician from the state to be elected outright as a Democrat in 1913).

John R. Rogers authored many books, pamphlets and articles that followed a Populist and Arcadian Agrarian spirit. Growing up in New England when Jeffersonian ideals were talked about frequently was a strong influence on his political future.

=== Death and legacy ===
Rogers served as governor from January 11, 1897, until his death from lobar pneumonia on December 26, 1901, at age 63. Rogers is buried in the Woodbine Cemetery in Puyallup.

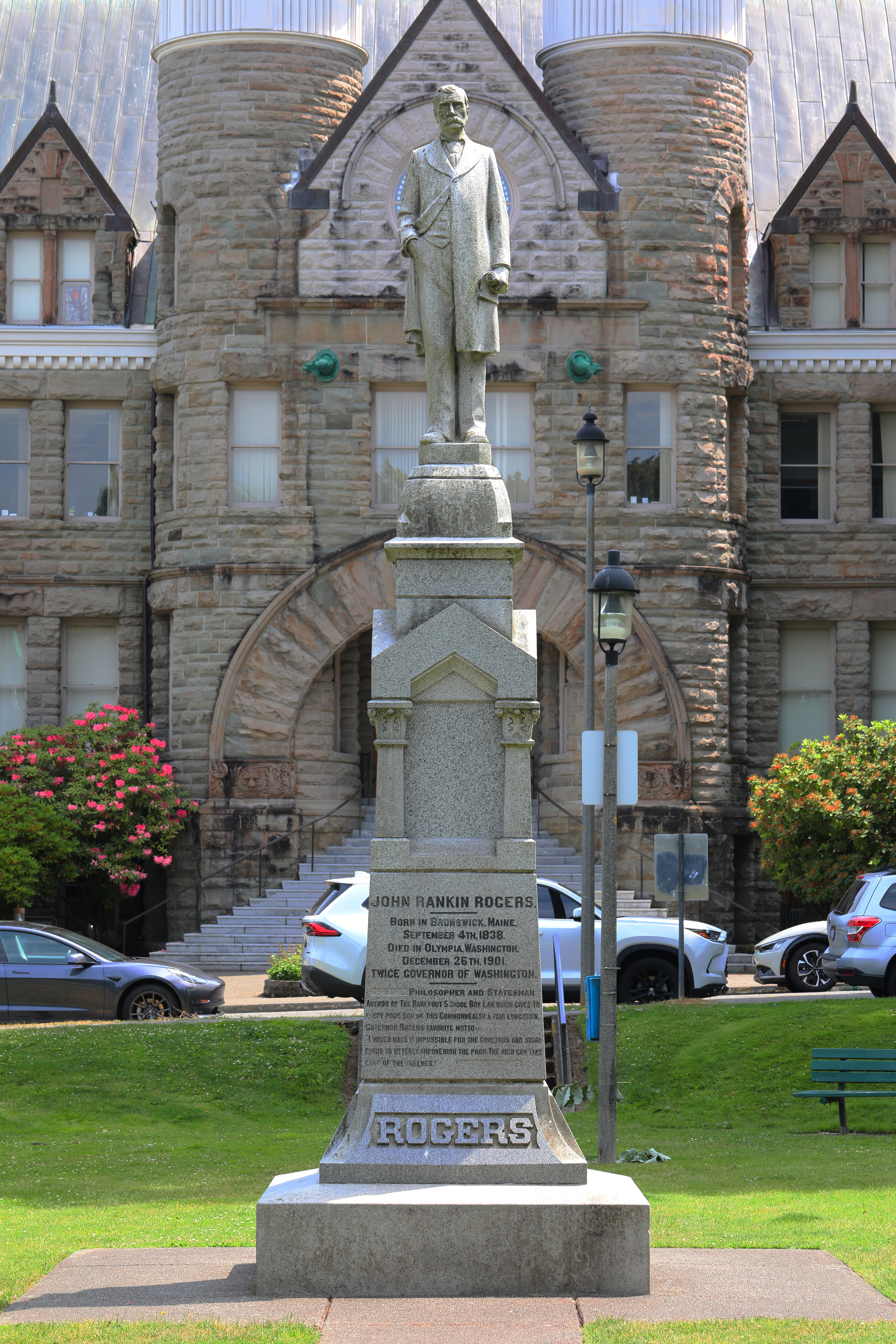
Rogers monument in Sylvester Park, Olympia

Two high schools in the state are named for Rogers, on either side of the Cascade Mountains. John R. Rogers High School in Spokane in Eastern Washington opened in 1932 and Governor John R. Rogers High School in Puyallup opened in 1968.

Rogers Field, the football and track stadium at Washington State University in Pullman, was named for him in 1902. A fire, a suspected arson, significantly damaged the wooden stadium in April 1970. The stadium was reconstructed in 1972 and its name changed to Martin Stadium, after Clarence D. Martin, the eleventh governor of Washington (ironically, a graduate of the University of Washington). The present-day Rogers Field at WSU refers to the practice and intramural fields directly west of the stadium.

A granite statue of Rogers is in Sylvester Park, across the street from the Old Capitol Building, with the following quote engraved:

"I would make it impossible for the covetous and avaricious to utterly impoverish the poor. The rich can take care of themselves."

== Footnotes ==
Party political offices
Preceded by Cyrus W. Young	Populist nominee for Governor of Washington; 1896	Succeeded by None
Vacant Title last held by Henry J. Snively	Democratic nominee for Governor of Washington; 1900	Succeeded by George Turner
Political offices
Preceded by John H. McGraw	Governor of Washington; 1897–1901	Succeeded by Henry McBride
