= Samuel G. Cosgrove =

6th governor of Washington

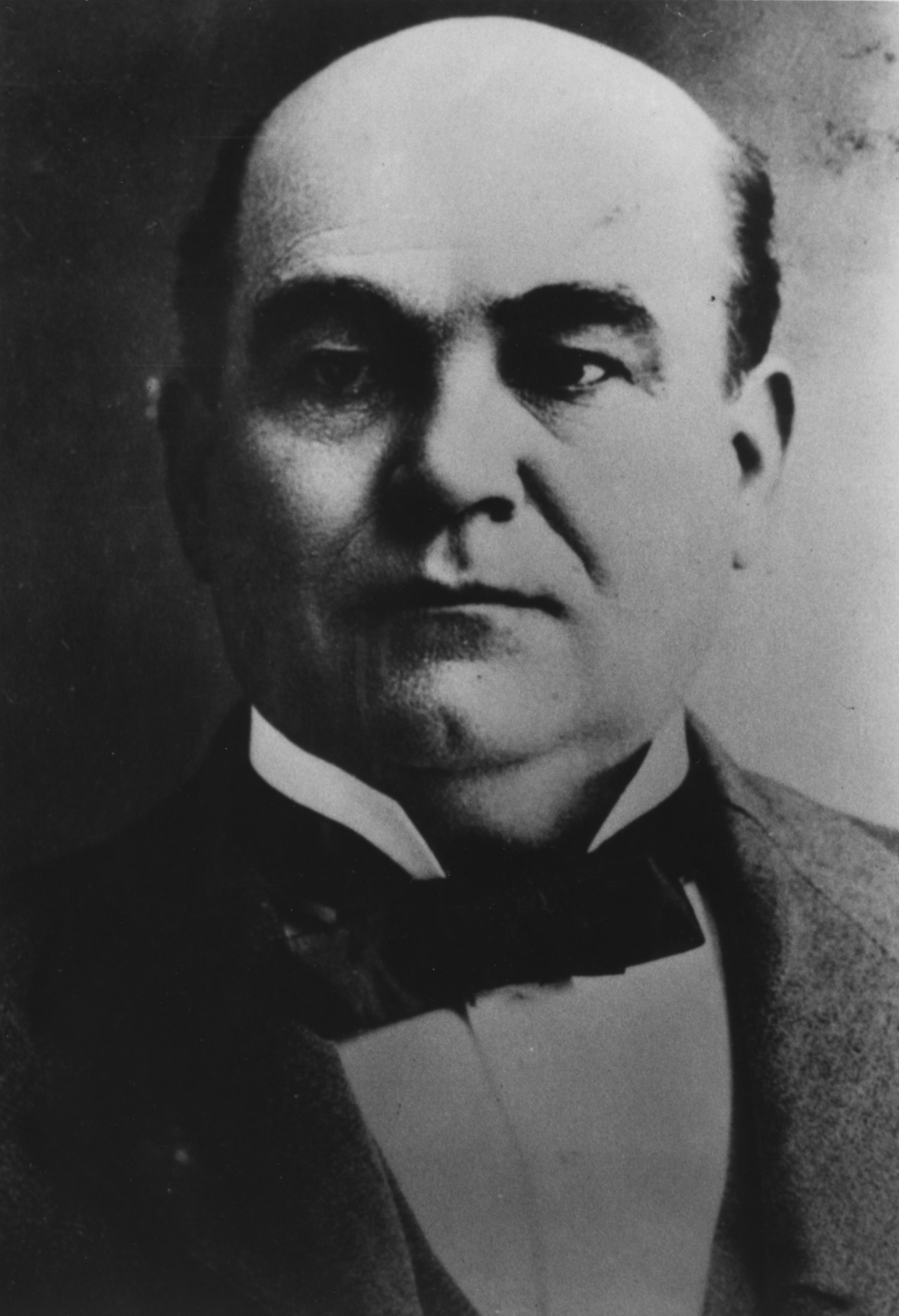

6th Governor of Washington
- In office January 27, 1909 – March 28, 1909
- Lieutenant: Marion E. Hay
- Preceded by: Albert E. Mead
- Succeeded by: Marion E. Hay

Personal details
- Born: Samuel Goodlove Cosgrove; April 10, 1847 Tuscarawas County, Ohio, U.S.
- Died: March 28, 1909 (aged 61) Paso Robles, California, U.S.
- Party: Republican

Samuel Goodlove Cosgrove (April 10, 1847 – March 28, 1909) was an American politician who served as the sixth governor of Washington from January to March 1909. He was a U.S. Civil War veteran and a Republican.

== Biography ==
Cosgrove was born in Tuscarawas County, Ohio to a scholarly family, and one of twelve siblings, most of whom became teachers. He enlisted in the 14th Ohio Volunteer Infantry of the Union Army at the age of sixteen, and served in the Civil War. He was honorably discharged in July 1865.

After the war, Cosgrove taught school at Woodsfield and Brooklyn, Ohio, and attended Ohio Wesleyan University earning M. A. and LL.B. degrees in 1873. He read law under Hollister and Okey at Woodsfield and was admitted to the bar in 1875. He married Zephorena Edgerton in Cleveland, Ohio, on June 26, 1878. The couple had three children, Howard, Elliot, and Myrn.

== Career ==
Cosgrove left Ohio in 1880, spent a year mining in Nevada, a year in California, and settled in Pomeroy, Washington in 1882. He practiced law and managed 1400 acres of farm land in Washington and Idaho. He was president of the Pomeroy School Board for eight years, and the city's mayor for five terms.

A candidate for Republican nomination at several state conventions, Cosgrove won the nomination in the first primary after adoption of a direct primary law, when no candidate won the majority and second-choice votes were added. After winning the general election, he suffered a heart attack, was too weak to finish his inaugural address, and was granted a leave of absence, earning him the title "Washington's One-Day Governor".

== Death ==
Cosgrove died March 28, 1909, in Paso Robles, California where he had gone to recuperate. He is interred at Masonic Memorial Park, Tumwater, Washington.

Party political offices
Preceded by Albert E. Mead	Republican nominee for Governor of Washington; 1908	Succeeded by Marion E. Hay
Political offices
Preceded by Albert E. Mead	Governor of Washington; 1909	Succeeded by Marion E. Hay
