= Disappearance of Sofia Juarez =

Disappeared child from Kennewick, Washington, U.S.

Sofia Juarez
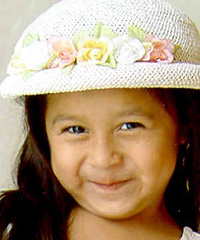
- Born: February 5, 1998
- Disappeared: February 4, 2003 (aged 4); Kennewick, Washington, United States
- Status: Missing for 23 years, 7 months and 2 days
- Mother: Maria Juarez

Sofia Lucerno Juarez (born February 5, 1998) was a four-year-old American child who disappeared in Kennewick, Washington in 2003. Her case involved the first use of an Amber alert in the state of Washington. As of 2026, Juarez's whereabouts and the circumstances of her disappearance remain unknown.

== Background ==
Locations
1 Last known location

Sofia lived on the 100 block on East 15th Avenue in east Kennewick, Washington with her mother, Maria Juarez; her grandmother, Ignacia Prado Juarez; her grandmother's boyfriend, Jose Lopez Torres; and her six aunts and uncles. Sofia's family was originally from Mexico. At the time of the disappearance, Maria Juarez was 20 years old. Juarez's father, Andres Gutierrez Abrajan, had no contact with the Juarez family and denied being Sofia's father. Sofia's grandfather, Jose Luis Juarez, did not live at the residence but would join the family shortly after the disappearance.

Sofia was four years old at the time of her disappearance. She was celebrating her fifth birthday the next day. She has dark hair and brown eyes, with a mole under one eye and a birthmark on her lower back. At the time of her disappearance she stood 3 feet (91 cm) tall, weighed 33 pounds (15 kg), and was missing her four upper front teeth. She also had pierced ears.

== Disappearance ==
Sofia disappeared shortly after 8:00 pm on Tuesday, February 4, 2003, one day before her fifth birthday. She was at home with her mother, playing with some of her young uncles. Jose Lopez Torres, her grandmother's boyfriend, was preparing to leave for a nearby convenience store and had asked the children if they wanted to join him. Although the others refused, Sofia decided to take him up on the offer at the last minute. Torres, however, was not aware she had changed her mind and left the house without Sofia.

Around this time, Sofia asked her mother for a dollar to spend at the store. Maria watched Sofia leave the room and heard her close the door as she left the house. The last confirmed sighting of Sofia was by her mother, when Sofia left the house that evening. When she left the house, Sofia wore a red long-sleeved shirt, blue overalls, violet socks, white Converse sneakers, and gold hoop earrings. Although temperature outside was roughly 36 °F (2 °C), she left the house without a coat.

After arriving at the store, Torres purchased milk and made a call at a payphone to relatives in Mexico before returning home at 9:45pm. Back at the house, he and Maria became aware of the miscommunication and that Sofia had nonetheless left the house to join him. After quickly searching for her daughter, Maria contacted police at 9:53 p.m.

== Investigation ==
Initial interviews with family members were conducted, and up to seven different patrol officers began searching Sofia's house, yard, the family's vehicles, neighborhood properties, playgrounds, parks, schools, businesses, fields, and vacant lots. The search radius was eventually increased to a 3 miles (4.8 km) radius around Sofia's neighborhood.

The police arrived within three minutes of receiving the call about Sofia's disappearance. Police were able to find circumstances of the report — particularly the time of night she disappeared, weather conditions, and Juarez's age. The circumstances made it appear unlikely that she had wandered off or was hiding.

It was quickly ruled out that Sofia was missing as a result of an injury or becoming lost. Her case was immediately taken as a likely child abduction. Within an hour, the publicity of Sofia's disappearance was broadcast by the media. Dozens of private citizens responded that night to assist in the search for Sofia. Citizens were teamed up with police officers to create multiple search teams. Systematic quadrant searches were conducted and expanded as more resources and information became available. Night vision and thermal imaging devices were used, dumpsters and residential garbage cans were searched. Over the three days after Sofia's disappearance, hundreds of citizen volunteers assisted police in the search.

Within an hour of the reporting of Sofia's disappearance, the FBI was called in and arrived to conduct a joint abducted child investigation with the Kennewick Police Department. Within hours, the National Center for Missing and Exploited Children (NCMEC) was notified and a case manager was assigned. Washington state's first Amber alert was issued and in effect for 36 hours. Sofia was entered into the Washington State and National Crime Information Center database as a missing/endangered person. Regional attempts to locate teletypes were sent to law enforcement agencies in Washington, Oregon, Idaho, California, Nevada, Alaska, and the Royal Canadian Mounted Police (RCMP).

By the next morning after Sofia's disappearance, an Incident Management Team was established to assist with oversight and support for search operations. Over the next three days over 500 police officers, FBI agents, Dive and Rescue members, Incident Management Team personnel, and civilian volunteer members became involved in the search for Sofia. Fixed-wing aircraft and helicopters, equipped with special thermal imaging devices, searched waterways, neighborhoods, and remote areas. Sheriff patrol boats and the Coast Guard searched nearby rivers. City crews searched sewer systems. King County Search and Rescue cadaver and scent dog teams were used on several occasions. Flyers were widely distributed to schools and businesses seeking any information on Sofia. The Fraternal Order of Police offered a $5,000 reward for information on Sofia. Crime Stoppers also offered a $1,000 reward.

Criminal investigation

As searches were being conducted to locate Sofia or evidence of her disappearance, the Kennewick Police Department and FBI jointly investigated the possible abduction of Sofia. Investigators were called in the night she disappeared. Surrounding law enforcement agencies contributed investigators to aid in the criminal investigation.

The FBI's information management system was utilized to document and investigate tips and leads. Ultimately, over 800 tips or leads were provided and investigated. The FBI Evidence Response Team and Washington State Patrol Crime Scene Response Team aided in the review and collection of possible evidence pursuant to multiple search warrants on homes and vehicles.

Family members, friends, Sofia's biological father, and others were located and investigated. Over 150 sex offenders living in Kennewick, or outside the immediate area, were either researched, contacted, or investigated for possible links to Sofia. Over 144 out-of-area reported sightings of Sofia were investigated. Pen registration traps and traces were placed on telephones. Telephone records were obtained pursuant to subpoenas and search warrants. Multiple residences and vehicles were searched. Persons of interest were identified and investigated. As of October 2021, nobody had been charged in regards to Sofia's disappearance.

A DNA profile for Sofia was created and is entered in the FBI's national Combined DNA Index System (CODIS). Her DNA profile is periodically compared against unidentified persons or remains located throughout the country. NCMEC has provided periodic age progression images of what Sofia may look like. They maintain a poster of Sofia on their website.

On February 8, police searched three residences in Kennewick and Burbank with police dogs; the Burbank home belonged to the mother of murderer Jeremy Vargas Sagastegui, who objected to police searching her home and claimed detectives were attempting to pressure her and her sons into admitting to an attack on Juarez. A fourth home was searched three days later after the man who lived there made a suspicious comment about the disappearance in a sexually explicit phone call to a stranger; police later determined he had no connection to the case, but charged him with telephone harassment.

For the first 45 days after Juarez was reported missing, the entire Kennewick police department was focused on solving her case, as were agents from the Federal Bureau of Investigation. At least four detectives served as lead investigator on the case in the first eight years of the investigation. According to police, the role of lead investigator is assigned to a different person every few years to bring new perspectives to the forefront.

=== Public response ===
A candlelit vigil and march was held for Juarez on February 11, 2003, one week after the disappearance. The vigil began at the Juarez home and saw about 300 people march from the house to St. Joseph's Church. By the third week of the search for Sofia, the Juarez family had removed the public memorial established outside their home.

On March 1, 2003, NASCAR racer Damon Lusk, a graduate of Kennewick's Kamiakin High School, participated in the Busch Series race with a 20x50-inch photo of Juarez emblazoned on his car's trunk. Lusk and Tommy Baldwin Racing had announced they would donate the space seventeen days into the search for Juarez, forfeiting sponsorship revenue in the hopes that it would raise awareness for her case.

Juarez's case was featured on America's Most Wanted less than three weeks after she had vanished. The initial broadcast generated 13 phone tips from as far afield as New York. She was also featured on subsequent episodes in September 2003 and March 2004.

Juarez has been featured in two campaigns to raise the public profile of missing persons in Washington using semi-trailer trucks as mobile billboards. The first was carried out with the company Gordon Trucking. The "Homeward Bound" awareness campaign, a collaborative effort between the Washington State Patrol Missing and Unidentified Persons Unit and Kam-Way Transportation, unveiled trucks bearing Juarez's likeness on February 4, 2021. The trucks showcase details of cases such as Juarez's as they travel through the Pacific Northwest and beyond. In her Homeward Bound posters, a photo of Juarez at age 4 appears next to an age-progressed photo of how she may have looked at age 17.

Her missing poster has been exhibited in Times Square, New York City, and at the annual Benton-Franklin Fair & Rodeo in Kennewick.

=== Current status ===
In late 2007 or early 2008, Maria Juarez moved to California. In mid-2008, she gave birth to another child. Maria Juarez died in Sacramento on January 10, 2009 from medical complications, nearly six years after her daughter's disappearance. She was cremated and on January 16 her funerary procession carried her ashes from the corner of East 15th Ave and Washington Street to the St. Joseph's Church, the same route followed by the February 2003 candlelit vigil for her daughter. In statements to the media after her death, Maria's family stated that she had never given up hope Sofia would eventually be found.

In 2015, Kennewick Police Chief Ken Hohenberg asked retired Richland police Capt. Al Wehner to review nine cold cases from the area. Juarez's disappearance is one of the cases Wehner has looked into, and as of February 2021 he was the lead investigator.

A new police effort to further the investigation was launched in December 2020. According to police, their case file on the Juarez case is more than 20,000 pages long.

In March 2021, the Kennewick Police Department created a website devoted to Sofia's disappearance. It describes how Sofia's disappearance impacted the community, adding, "Sofia was a beacon of sunshine who had a bright and innocent life stolen from her. Her family, friends and community have lived under a dark cloud since she was taken from us. Sofia was, and still is, loved by all who knew her."

In May 2021, a video on TikTok was published with a 22-year-old woman who resembled age-progressed images of Sofia, leading the Kennewick Police to open an investigation into the video.

In August 2021, The Vanished Podcast released an episode on Sofia's story including interviews with the original and current investigators and an update on the TikTok lead.

Suspect and suspect vehicle description

In June 2021, police released a suspect description on the person and vehicle they believe was involved in Sofia's abduction. A witness observed a Hispanic juvenile male, estimated to be 11 to 14 years old at the time. After the suspect encountered Sofia, he led her towards a van, laughing as she cried. Police believe the van and the suspect are likely associated. A Kennewick couple offered a $10,000 reward for information leading to the discovery of Sofia's whereabouts.

=== Theories ===
Police believe Sofia attempted to follow her grandmother's boyfriend to the store after realizing he had left without her. Although it was located only a few blocks from the home, Sofia never arrived at the store. Video surveillance taken from the store confirmed Torres's version of events was accurate. Kennewick Police Chief Marc Harden told the media in 2003 "everyone and no one is a person of interest". In a 2011 interview, police detective Sgt. Randy Maynard said he believed Juarez was still alive: "My gut is that she's alive ... If she's deceased, we'd have found her remains". In 2013, Sgt. Ken Lattin told media "we don't have any evidence that she's still alive, we don't have any evidence that she's not still alive".

==== Various leads ====
Pieces of a skull were discovered by a farmer in a field south of Ritzville on August 12, 2006 after a fire destroyed a patch of waist-high weeds which had obscured the bones. The field had previously been searched in 2003 after Juarez's disappearance, and again in 2004 following the disappearance of 11-year-old Cody Haynes. The remains were sent to the King County Medical Examiner's Office to be DNA tested, but the results were inconclusive. In 2007, radiocarbon dating revealed the skull fragments were at least 600 years old, and couldn't have belonged to Juarez or Haynes.

In 2011, police detective Wes Gardner (then the lead investigator on the case) told media that he was working with the Long Beach Police Department to investigate a tip which suggested a teenager named "Sofia Juarez" of a similar age had been found on Facebook living in Long Beach, California. It was ultimately found that this was not the same girl who had disappeared in 2003.

Since Sofia's disappearance, over 225 leads have been provided to police about illicit drug users in a vehicle having accidentally hit Sofia with a vehicle, transporting her from the scene to a remote location where she was killed and buried. Various names and vehicle descriptions have been provided. Police continue to investigate all leads.

==== Abduction by family ====
Juarez's father, who had never had a relationship with Sofia, was cooperative with investigators. He was ruled out as a suspect within forty-eight hours of her disappearance, providing a verifiable alibi to police.

==== Abduction by strangers ====
Sofia's mother, Maria Juarez, claimed after the disappearance that her daughter was shy and wouldn't have gone with any stranger willingly. Maria Juarez believed that Sofia would only have gone away willingly with somebody she was familiar with. Investigators have looked into the possibility that Sofia was abducted by a stranger and murdered, or may remain alive but held against her will.

== See also ==
- List of people who disappeared mysteriously (2000–present)
