= Hanging in the United States =

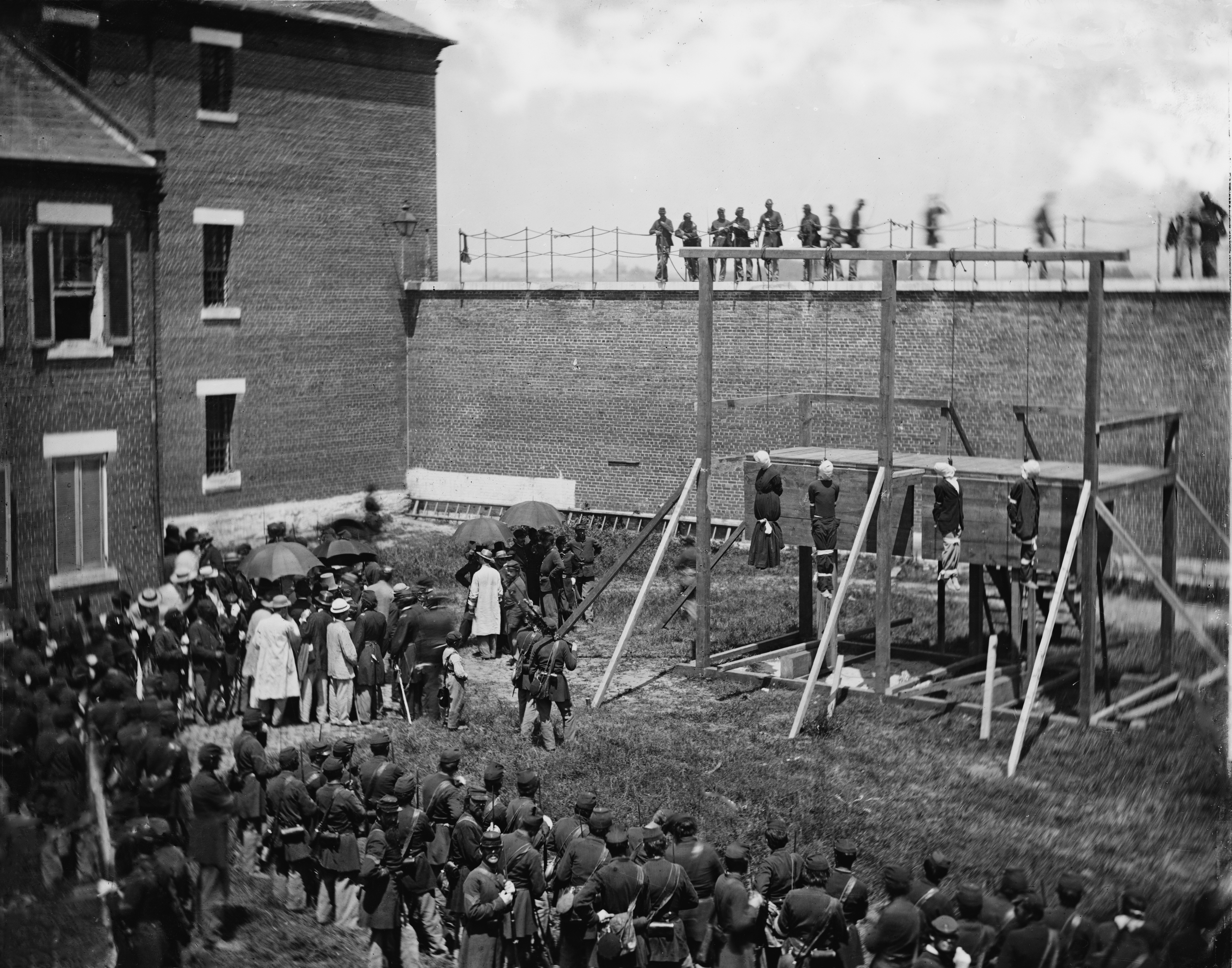
The hanging of Mary Surratt, Lewis Powell, David Herold, and George Atzerodt (Abraham Lincoln’s assassins), 1865

Hanging has been practiced legally in the United States of America from before the nation's birth, up to 1972 when the United States Supreme Court found capital punishment to be in violation of the Eighth Amendment to the United States Constitution. Four years later, the Supreme Court overturned its previous ruling, and in 1976, capital punishment was again legalized in the United States. Currently, only New Hampshire has a law specifying hanging as an available secondary method of execution, now only applicable to one person, who was sentenced to capital punishment by the state prior to its repeal in 2019.

== Colonial America ==
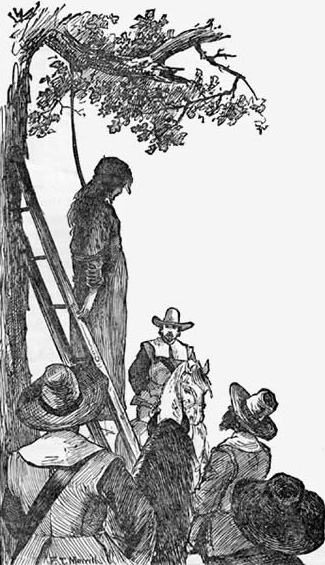
Execution of Ann Hibbins on Boston Common, June 19, 1656. Sketch by F.T. Merril, 1886

Hanging was one method of execution in Colonial America. According to the Espy file, Daniel Frank was hanged in 1623 for cattle theft in the Jamestown colony. John Billington is thought to be one of the first men to be hanged in New England; Billington was convicted of murder in September 1630 after he shot and killed John Newcomen.

During the Salem witch trials of the early 1690s, most of the men and women convicted of witchcraft were sentenced to public hanging. It is estimated that seventeen women and two men were hanged, as a result of the trials.

Hangings during the colonial era of America were mostly performed publicly in order to deter the behavior for which the criminals were hanged. Thousands of townspeople would gather around the gallows to hear a sermon and observe the hangings of convicted criminals. Such experiences were deemed to be good lessons on morality for the children and townspeople.

== 1776 – 1840 ==
Following the American Revolution led by the Continental Congress and the subsequent ratification of the United States Constitution, the Bill of Rights was signed into law and became the first ten amendments to that constitution. The eighth amendment of the Bill of rights states that cruel and unusual punishment shall not be inflicted. During this time period, hanging was not considered to be cruel and unusual, yet almost two hundred years later, this amendment was key to the temporary suspension of capital punishment by the Supreme Court. Today, the eighth amendment is still an essential argument employed by those in favor of abolishing capital punishment.

During this time of political unrest, some prominent members of society believed that capital punishment such as hanging ought to be abolished. One such man, Benjamin Rush, published a pamphlet in 1807 speaking out against the death penalty. In the pamphlet, Rush often raises religious arguments such as, "The punishment of murder by death is contrary to reason, and to the order and happiness of society, and contrary to divine revelation." Individuals like Benjamin Rush laid the foundation for death penalty abolition movements that are still carried on today.

Hangings were common during the early part of the nineteenth century. Just as in Colonial America, hangings were still conducted in public for all to witness. However, unlike the colonial era, men and women were no longer hanged for offenses like adultery. In fact, by 1836 Pennsylvania only hanged criminals convicted of murder in the first degree. In New York, the number of capital crimes were brought down from nineteen to just two. By 1815, other states like Vermont, Virginia, Kentucky, Maryland, New Hampshire, and Ohio (with the slaves) also drastically decreased their number of capital offenses, usually lowering the number down to just two or three. Because of these changes in law, hangings began to decrease in some regions of the country. However, some states went in the opposite direction. Most of the southern states in addition to Connecticut, Massachusetts, New Jersey, and Rhode Island actually raised their number of capital offenses.

== 1830 – 1920 ==
Starting in the early 1830s, public hangings were considered by many to be cruel. Many others considered them a major community event, and still others took to them as an opportunity to become unruly, as with modern sporting events: "Sometimes tens of thousands of eager viewers would show up to view hangings; local merchants would sell souvenirs and alcohol. Fighting and pushing would often break out as people jockeyed for the best view of the hanging or the corpse. Onlookers often cursed the widow or the victim and would try to tear down the scaffold or the rope for keepsakes. Violence and drunkenness often ruled towns far into the night after 'justice had been served." By 1835, five states – Pennsylvania, New York, New Jersey, Rhode Island, and Massachusetts – had enacted laws providing for private hangings. Fourteen years later, in 1849, fifteen more states also enacted such laws. However, most opponents of hanging opposed these laws. These abolitionists believed that public execution would eventually lead the general population to cry out against the capital punishment, eventually putting an end to hanging in the United States.

In 1862 President Abraham Lincoln sanctioned the hanging of 39 Sioux Indians convicted of murdering white settlers in Mankato, Minnesota. This mass execution remains the largest of its kind in United States history.

Four people were hanged for their participation in the assassination of Abraham Lincoln. Mary Surratt, one of the four, was the first woman to receive capital punishment by the United States federal government.

=== The Wild West ===
As the United States began to expand west, most new states favored the death penalty, and hanging continued to be the most popular means of execution. In addition, disregarding the trend set by many northern states, these states would hang criminals for offenses like robbery and rape. Because of the abundant lawlessness and crime in the Wild West, judges were strict, and hangings were commonplace. If a judge was particularly ruthless, he became known as a hanging judge. Isaac C. Parker, perhaps the best-known hanging judge, sentenced 160 men to death by hanging. However, of those 160, only 79 were actually executed; the remaining 81 either appealed, died in jail, or were pardoned. Though at the time, these judges were criticized for issuing so many death sentences, a few modern scholars maintain that most of the judges were honorable men trying to establish law and order in the wild American frontier.

=== Lynching ===
After the American Civil War, the frontier opened up, and law lagged, with an undetermined number of local criminals suffering lynching, or extrajudicial hanging. In the South, tensions arising from Reconstruction led to several lynchings. Scholars estimate that 4,742 people, mostly male, were lynched from 1882 to 1968. About 3,445 of those individuals were African American, and 1,297 were white.

=== The Electric Chair ===
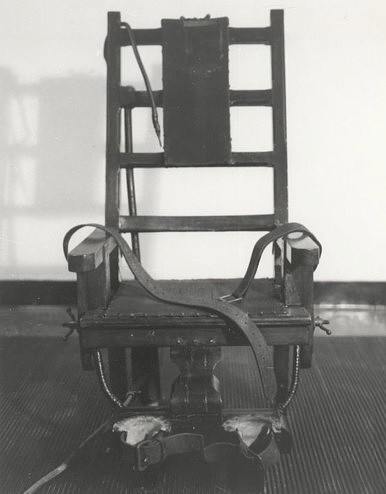
Old Sparky, the electric chair used at Sing Sing prison

In 1890, New York became the first state to use the electric chair as a means of execution. Though it took two surges of electricity lasting nearly two minutes to kill William Kemmler, the electric chair replaced hanging as the most efficient and preferred method of execution in the United States. This was the first time in United States history that a method other than hanging was the leading means of execution.

== 1921 – present ==
Since the introduction of the electric chair in 1890, the number of hangings have steadily decreased. The introduction of the gas chamber in 1924 further reduced the number of hangings in the United States, as many states in the West, like Nevada, California, and Arizona, opted to replace hanging with the gas chamber throughout the 1920s, 1930s, and 1940s.

In 1936, Rainey Bethea was hanged after he was convicted of rape; over 20,000 people came to Owensboro, Kentucky, to witness Bethea's execution. Many scholars maintain that the unprecedented nationwide attention and coverage the execution received caused the United States to phase out public executions. Therefore, Bethea was the last individual to be hanged publicly in the United States. In the decades preceding and following Bethea's execution, states had been eliminating hanging as means of execution altogether until the death penalty was de facto suspended in the mid-1960s.

When the death penalty was resumed in 1976 following the Gregg v. Georgia ruling, most states that had executed inmates primarily by hanging prior to the ruling implemented lethal injection instead. Delaware's Billy Bailey was the last criminal to be hanged in the United States, in 1996. Bailey was just the third criminal to be hanged since 1965, the other two being Charles Rodman Campbell in 1994 and Westley Allan Dodd in 1993, both in Washington State.
