= Westley Allan Dodd =

American serial killer and sex offender (1961–1993)

- Dodd's mug shot, taken in July 1990
- Born: July 3, 1961; Toppenish, Washington, U.S.
- Died: January 5, 1993 (aged 31); Washington State Penitentiary, Washington, U.S.
- Other names: The Vancouver Child Killer, Shellie "Lee" Brooks
- Status: Executed by hanging
- Convictions: Aggravated first-degree murder (3 counts); Attempted aggravated first-degree murder
- Penalty: Death

Details
- Victims: 3 (killed)
- Span of crimes: September 4 – October 30, 1989
- Country: United States
- State: Washington
- Date apprehended: November 13, 1989

Westley Allan Dodd (July 3, 1961 – January 5, 1993) was an American convicted serial killer and sex offender who sexually assaulted and murdered three young boys in Vancouver, Washington, in 1989. He was arrested later that year after a failed attempt to abduct a six-year-old boy at a movie theatre in Camas, Washington.

Dodd wrote detailed accounts of his murders in a diary that was found by police. He pleaded guilty to the murders and was sentenced to death after taking the stand and telling the judge and jury that he would do everything possible to kill again, including trying to escape and killing prison guards, unless he was put to death. After refusing an automatic appeal, Dodd was executed by hanging on January 5, 1993, the first legal hanging in the United States since 1965.

In response to the cases of Dodd and Earl Kenneth Shriner, the Washington State Legislature authorized the indefinite civil commitment of a convict who has been deemed to be a "sexually violent predator."

== Early life ==
Westley Allan Dodd was born in Toppenish, Washington, on July 3, 1961, the oldest of three children to James and Carol Dodd. Dodd was raised in Richland, Washington. He claimed he was never abused or neglected as a child, though he did state that the words "I love you" were never said to him as he grew up and that he could not remember saying them in return. In a court document, Dodd's younger sister said about their upbringing: "We were never beaten, we had food and clothes, but there was just no family, no love." Dodd's younger brother Gregory was arrested in 2016 for attempting to meet an undercover Homeland Security agent for sex who was posing as a 13-year-old girl and her mother.

The Seattle Times reported that Dodd described in a diary written during his imprisonment that his father had been emotionally and physically abusive, that he was often neglected in favor of his younger siblings and that he witnessed violent fights between his parents. At school, Dodd was not welcomed into any social groups, leaving him with no friends. By the age of 9 he had discovered that he was sexually attracted to other boys. On July 3, 1976—Dodd's fifteenth birthday—his father attempted suicide following an argument with his wife.

== Criminal history ==
=== Sex offenses ===
At the age of 13, Dodd began exposing himself to children in his neighborhood. His father eventually told an Oregon newspaper that he was aware of this behavior but largely ignored it, since he felt his son was otherwise a "well-behaved child who never had problems with drugs, drinking or smoking." By the time he entered high school, Dodd had progressed to child molestation, beginning with his younger cousins and then with neighborhood children he offered to babysit, as well as the children of a woman his father was dating. At the age of 15, Dodd was arrested for indecent exposure, but police released him with a recommendation for juvenile counseling.

In August 1981, at the age of 20, Dodd tried to abduct two girls, who reported him to the police. No action was taken. The following month, Dodd enlisted in the United States Navy and was assigned to the submarine base in Bangor, Washington, where he began abusing children who lived on the base. In one of these incidents, Dodd offered a group of boys $50 to accompany him to a motel room for a game of strip poker. Upon his arrest, Dodd confessed to police that he planned to molest the boys. He was released with no charges filed.

Around the middle of 1982, Dodd was discharged from the Navy (either a general discharge or an other-than-honorable discharge) after being absent without leave. In December, Dodd told a six-year-old boy to watch while he sexually stimulated himself with a pen refill by inserting it into his penis, for which he was arrested and charged with "communicating with a minor for immoral purposes". He pleaded guilty and, on the condition that he attend counseling, he was released after spending less than 20 days in custody.

In February 1983, Dodd moved to Lewiston, Idaho. In March and April 1983, he molested a nine-year-old boy. In May 1984, the boy and his mother reported the molestation to the police, who arrested Dodd and charged him with "lewd and lascivious conduct with a minor". In August, he was given a 10-year sentence, but after Dodd agreed to plead guilty, the judge commuted his sentence to a single year, on the condition that he attend counseling. Dodd was released after spending four months in Nez Perce County Jail.

In 1986, Dodd returned to Washington State, at first living in Kennewick, and then in Seattle.

Dodd planned his entire life around easy access to "targets", as he referred to children. He moved into an apartment block that housed families with children, and worked at fast food restaurants, as a charity truck driver and other such jobs. Dodd repeatedly molested the pre-school-aged children of a neighbor, but the woman declined to press charges, fearing the experience would be too traumatic for her children.

In 1987, Dodd tried to lure a young boy into a vacant building, but the boy refused to go with him and instead told police. Prosecutors were aware of Dodd's history of sexual offenses and recommended five years in prison. However, once again, Dodd received minimal punishment because he had not actually touched the boy nor exposed himself. Instead, he was placed on probation and ordered to seek psychiatric treatment. After finishing probation, Dodd stopped going to treatment and moved to Vancouver, Washington, where he was hired as a shipping clerk.

In the early autumn of 1989, Dodd decided that David Douglas Park in Vancouver, a large, heavily wooded park with several secluded trails, would be an ideal place to find potential victims. He was arrested several times over the next few years for child molestation, each time serving short jail sentences and being given court-mandated therapy. All Dodd's victims (around fifty in all) were below the age of 12, some of them aged as young as 2, and most were boys.

Dodd's sexual fantasies became increasingly violent as his behavior escalated; he would later say, "The more I thought about it, the more exciting the idea of murder sounded. I planned many ways to kill a boy." A psychiatrist who evaluated Dodd following one of his convictions said that he fit the legal criteria for a "sexual psychopath."

=== Murders ===
On September 4, 1989, Dodd went to David Douglas Park with a fish fillet knife and shoelaces, seeking out young boys to kill. He lured two brothers, 11- and 10-year-old Cole and William Neer, to a secluded area, where he forced them to undress, tied them to a tree and performed sex acts on both. When he was done, Dodd stabbed the boys repeatedly with the knife and fled the scene. The boys were soon discovered in the park. Cole was found dead at the scene, while William died en route to a nearby hospital. Afterward, Dodd started a scrapbook with newspaper clippings about the murders.

On October 29, Dodd drove to Portland, Oregon, where he encountered 4-year-old Lee Iseli and his 9-year-old brother Justin on the playground at Richmond Elementary School. The younger boy was playing alone on a slide, and Dodd succeeded in convincing the boy to come with him. Justin had gone home, so Dodd told Lee that he would drive him back to his house. He managed to take Lee to his apartment in Vancouver apparently unnoticed, and there he ordered the boy to undress. Dodd then tied Lee to his bed and molested him, taking photographs of the abuse. Dodd kept Lee overnight while he continued to abuse him, all the while jotting down every detail in his diary. The next morning, Dodd strangled Lee to death with a rope and hung his body in the closet, photographing it as a macabre "trophy".

Dodd would later confess to police that he had originally planned not to kill the boy, but eventually decided that it was necessary to eliminate him based on his possible testimony. He stuffed Lee's nude body in trash bags, which he threw in some bushes near Vancouver Lake. He also burned Lee's clothing in a trash barrel except for the boy's underwear, which he kept as a souvenir of the crime. One day later, Lee's body was discovered, sparking a manhunt for the killer. Dodd kept a low profile and mostly stayed in his apartment, writing down future plans for child abductions and constructing a homemade torture rack for his next victim.

== Arrest ==
On November 13, 1989, Dodd drove to Camas, Washington, around 12 miles (19 km) east of Vancouver, where he attempted to abduct 6-year-old James Kirk II from the restroom of the New Liberty Theatre. Kirk began fighting and crying as Dodd attempted to leave the theatre through the lobby, carrying the boy in his arms. Theatre employees became suspicious and followed Dodd out to the street. Due to their pursuit, Dodd released Kirk, got into his car and drove away.

Kirk's mother's boyfriend, William "Ray" Graves, came to the theatre lobby and was told that the boy had nearly been abducted. Graves went outside the theatre in the direction where Dodd was last seen. Dodd's car had broken down a short distance away and he was attempting to start the motor. In order not to raise Dodd's suspicion and to stall for time, Graves pretended to be a passerby and offered to help him. He then put Dodd into a headlock and returned him to the theatre, where employees called the police.

The Camas police contacted the Portland police task force investigating the Iseli murder. Dodd was taken to Camas police station, where Portland detectives C.W. Jensen and Dave Trimble interviewed him. He was then taken to the Clark County jail in Vancouver, where Jensen and Trimble continued their interrogation over the course of three days. Eventually, Dodd confessed to all three murders. Jensen and Trimble then served a search warrant at Dodd's residence in Vancouver.

During the search of Dodd's residence, police discovered the homemade torture rack along with newspaper clippings about his crimes, a briefcase containing Iseli's underwear, a photo album containing pictures of Iseli and assorted photographs of children in newspaper and store catalogue underwear advertisements. They also discovered Dodd's diary, in which he wrote in detail about the murders.

== Trial ==
Dodd testifying at the sentencing phase of his murder trial (1990)

Dodd was charged with three counts of aggravated first-degree murder for the deaths of Billy Neer, Cole Neer, and Lee Iseli, as well as attempted first-degree murder and attempted first-degree kidnapping for the unsuccessful abduction of James Kirk. He initially pleaded not guilty to all charges, but later changed his plea to guilty. The attempted kidnapping charge was dropped, and Dodd was convicted of aggravated murder and attempted murder.

During his trial in Clark County Superior Court, the prosecution read excerpts of Dodd's diary and displayed photographs of Iseli in captivity. The defense did not call any witnesses or present any evidence, suggesting only that Dodd was legally insane. The jury found Dodd guilty; prosecutors requested a death sentence. At the sentencing phase of his murder trial, Dodd took the stand and personally requested a death sentence, telling the judge and jury that he was too dangerous to be kept alive.

- Judge: What would be your intention if you were forced to live in prison?
  - Dodd: Do everything I can to escape and if necessary kill prison guards on the way out and I'll go right back doing what I did before as soon as I hit the streets.
- Judge: Which is what?
  - Dodd: Kill kids.
- Judge: Kill and rape kids.
  - Dodd: Yes.
- Judge: So you should be executed for the safety of others?
  - Dodd: Yes.

Dodd claimed that speaking in his own defense was pointless and, ultimately, "the system had failed repeatedly".

"If you add up all the prison time I was given but never made to serve, I'd be in prison until 2026... and those boys would still be alive."

Washington State law gave Dodd the choice of execution by lethal injection or by hanging; Dodd stated that he wished to die by hanging because that was how he had killed Iseli, his last victim. In 1990, Dodd was sentenced to death for the murder of the Neer brothers, as well as for the separate rape and murder of Lee Iseli.

== Execution ==
Less than four years elapsed between the murders and Dodd's execution. He refused to appeal his case or the capital sentence, insisting that he could not control his urges and would kill again. He stated in one court brief: "I must be executed before I have an opportunity to escape or kill someone else. If I do escape, I promise you I will kill and rape again, and I will enjoy every minute of it." He also said in some interviews that death would give him relief from guilt over the murders. During his trial, Dodd wrote a pamphlet on how parents could protect children from child molesters such as himself.

The execution of Dodd by hanging was the first in the United States since 1965 when George York and James Latham were hanged in Kansas. Dodd's execution was witnessed by twelve members of regional and local media, prison officials and family members of the three victims. Dodd requested broiled salmon and scalloped potatoes for his last meal. His last words, spoken from the second floor of the indoor gallows, were recorded by the media witnesses as:

I was once asked by somebody, I don't remember who, if there was any way sex offenders could be stopped. I said, 'No.' I was wrong. I was wrong when I said there was no hope, no peace. There is hope. There is peace. I found both in the Lord, Jesus Christ. Look to the Lord, and you will find peace.

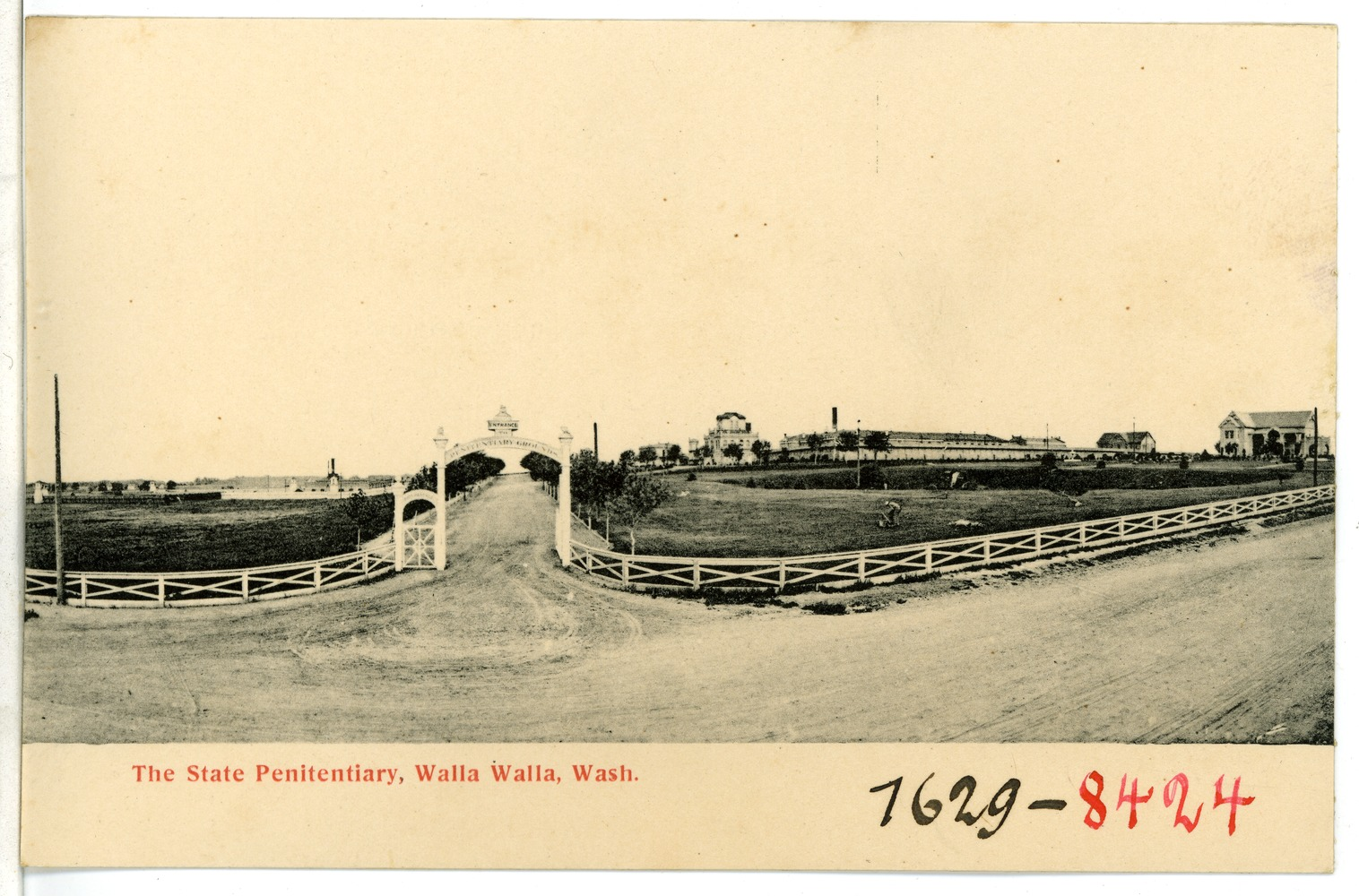
Washington State Penitentiary at Walla Walla

Dodd was executed at 12:05 a.m. on January 5, 1993, at Washington State Penitentiary in Walla Walla. He was pronounced dead by the prison doctor and his body was transported to Seattle for autopsy. King County Medical Examiner Donald Reay found that Dodd had died quickly, within two to three minutes, though not from a broken neck, which is the usual cause of death from hanging. Reay stated that Dodd's death had likely not been very painful. Following the autopsy, Dodd's body was cremated and his ashes were given to his family.

=== Execution controversy ===
Dodd's execution came with some controversy over his choice of execution method. The American Civil Liberties Union (ACLU) filed a lawsuit saying that execution by hanging was a violation of the Eighth Amendment of the United States Constitution. The lawsuit made it all the way to the Washington Supreme Court, but was unsuccessful in blocking Dodd's execution, largely because Dodd himself chose hanging.

On the day of the execution, many people gathered outside the prison, either supporting or protesting the execution. There was much media attention; some television news reports featured stories on the history of hanging, showing such things as the loud sound that the trap door can make, along with the silence that follows it; the type of rope that was going to be used; and how to properly prepare the rope for optimum effect.

== In popular culture ==
Dodd's profile was featured along with another convicted sexual predator imprisoned in Washington in the 1992 Frontline episode "Monsters Among Us".

Dodd's crimes are included in the Investigation Discovery television series Real Detective. In the episode titled "Malice", detective C. W. Jensen describes his involvement in bringing Dodd to justice and the effect it had on him personally.

Dodd is mentioned in the 1993 episode "Born Bad" from the fourth season of the crime drama television series Law & Order.

In 2006 Discovery Channel television series Most Evil analyzed his life and crimes. He was ranked at level 22, the highest point of the scale.

Dodd was the basis for an unseen character, a child killer named "Wayne Dobbs", in the 2002 film Insomnia, starring Al Pacino. He was fictionalized as a man who murdered a young boy in a way similar to Dodd's murder of Lee Iseli.

Several books have been written about the Dodd case, including: When the Monster Comes Out of the Closet by Lori Steinhorst, who communicated with Dodd in writing and by phone almost daily for 18 months prior to his execution; Driven to Kill by true crime author Gary C. King; and Dr. Ron Turco's book about his experience during the initial investigation to assist in developing a profile of the killer.

== See also ==
- Sergey Golovkin
- List of people executed in Washington
- List of people executed in the United States in 1993
- List of serial killers in the United States
- Volunteer (capital punishment)

Executions carried out in Washington
Preceded by Joseph Chester Self June 20, 1963	Westley Allan Dodd; January 5, 1993	Succeeded by Charles Rodman Campbell May 27, 1994
Executions carried out in the United States
Preceded by Timothy Dale Bunch – Virginia December 10, 1992	Westley Allan Dodd – Washington; January 5, 1993	Succeeded by Charles Stamper – Virginia January 19, 1993
