= Robert Lee Yates =

American serial killer (born 1952)

- Spokane police mugshot, 2000
- Born: Robert Lee Yates Jr. May 27, 1952 (age 74); Oak Harbor, Washington, U.S.
- Other names: The Spokane Serial Killer; The Grocery Bag Killer; The Prostitute Killer; Spokane Washington's Serial Killer
- Convictions: Aggravated first degree murder (2 counts); First degree murder (13 counts); Attempted first degree murder
- Penalty: 408 years imprisonment (Spokane County); Death; commuted to life imprisonment (Pierce County)

Details
- Victims: 16+
- Span of crimes: 1975–1998
- Country: United States
- State: Washington
- Date apprehended: April 18, 2000
- Imprisoned at: Washington State Penitentiary

Robert Lee Yates Jr. (born May 27, 1952), also known as the Spokane Serial Killer and the Grocery Bag Killer, is an American serial killer, kidnapper, rapist, necrophile, and former U.S. Army aircraft pilot who murdered at least sixteen people, mostly female sex workers, in eastern Washington between 1975 and 1998.

Yates was enlisted in the United States Army from 1977 to 1996, during which time he flew helicopters. He is believed to have begun killing in 1975 when a couple was shot to death in Walla Walla. Between 1988 and 1998, Yates committed eleven murders in Spokane County, two in Pierce County, and one in Skagit County. He was sentenced to death in 2002 but it was commuted to life without parole after the Washington Supreme Court ruled capital punishment unconstitutional in 2018. He is currently serving life in prison at the Washington State Penitentiary.

== Early life ==
Yates was born on May 27, 1952, in Oak Harbor, Washington, where he was raised in a middle-class family. They attended a local Seventh-day Adventist church. Yates had a family history of violence; in 1945, his grandmother murdered his grandfather with an axe.

Yates graduated from Oak Harbor High School in 1970. In 1975, he was hired by the Washington State Department of Corrections to work as a correction officer at the Washington State Penitentiary in Walla Walla.

In October 1977, Yates enlisted in the United States Army, where he became certified to fly civilian transport airplanes and helicopters. Yates was stationed in various countries outside the continental United States, including Germany, and later Somalia and Haiti during the United Nations peacekeeping missions of the 1990s. Yates also served three years in the Army National Guard as a helicopter pilot from April 1997 through April 2000. He earned several commendation and service medals during his military career, including: two Metorious Service Medals, three Army Commendation Medals, three Army Achievement Medals, two Armed Forces Expeditionary Medals, two United Nations Service Medals and the US Army Master Aviator Badge.

Yates left the active duty Army in April 1996, apparently a year and a half short of being eligible for his full retirement benefits and pension. At this time, the military was reducing its numbers, so he received full retirement despite being short of the customary 20 years served. He then joined the Army National Guard in April 1997, and served three years until his arrest in April 2000. He served a total of 21.5 years in the military.

He has five children, (four daughters and one son), with his second wife Linda, whom he married in 1976. The children's birth years range from 1974 to 1989.

== Murders ==
Yates committed his first murders in 1975, when he shot and killed two college students who were on a picnic together. Many of his subsequent victims were sex workers working along East Sprague Avenue who had substance abuse issues, and Yates would often do drugs with them and other sex workers. Yates initially solicited the victims; after having sex with them, often in his Ford van, he would kill them and dump their bodies in rural locations. All of his victims died of gunshot wounds to the head or heart. Eight of the murders were committed with a Raven .25-caliber handgun, and one attempted murder was linked to the same model of handgun.

Patrick Allen Oliver and Susan Patricia Savage
On July 14, 1975, the bodies of Patrick Oliver, 21, and Patricia Savage, 22, were found shot in the head near Walla Walla. They were last seen the day before, on their way for an afternoon swim and picnic.

Stacy Elizabeth Hawn
On December 28, 1988, the partial skeleton of Stacy Hawn, 23, was found near Big Lake. She was last seen on July 7, 1988, in Seattle. Yates confessed to picking up Hawn, who was working as a sex worker, in his van nearby.

Shannon Rene Zielinski
On June 14, 1996, Shannon Zielinski, 38, was found shot in the head in Mead. Her partially nude body was badly decomposed and dumped in a wooded area near a school bus stop. Zielinski had a lengthy criminal record and worked as a sex worker.

Heather Louise Hernandez
On August 26, 1997, the body of Heather Hernandez, 20, was found in an overgrown lot in Spokane. She was shot five days earlier according to detectives. Hernandez had only recently come to the area and within a few weeks was arrested twice for sex work.

Jennifer Ann Joseph
On August 26, 1997, Jennifer Joseph, 16, was found shot in the head in a field in Spokane. Police found a brown towel and a brown hair belonging to a white male at the scene. After Joseph's parent's divorce, she dropped out of high school and moved to Tacoma. She started using methamphetamine and became involved in sex work. She was killed just a month after arriving in Spokane.

Darla Sue Scott
On November 5, 1997, the partially decayed remains of Darla Scott, 29, were found in a shallow grave near a golf course in Spokane. Scott, who had a history of drugs and sex work, died of a gunshot wound to the head, likely in September or October.

Melinda Lee Mercer
On December 7, 1997, Melinda Mercer, 24, was found shot and dumped in a field in Tacoma; she had been shot several times and had four plastic bags covering her head. At Yates' trial, he revealed that even after he shot her in the head, Mercer had chewed through two of the bags before succumbing to her injuries. Mercer did not have a criminal record. She reportedly worked as a waitress.

Shawn Lynette Johnson
On December 18, 1997, the body of Shawn Johnson, 36, was found with two gunshot wounds and two plastic bags covering her head, about a mile from the remains of Darla Scott. She had been missing since October 17, 1997.

Shawn Ann McClenahan and Laurie Page Wason
On December 26, 1997, the bodies of Shawn McClenahan, 39, and Laurie Wason, 31, were found in a gully in Spokane. Both women were shot twice in the head and their heads were wrapped with three plastic bags each. Wason, who was last seen on November 3, was the devoted mother of a 12-year-old son until a relapse with heroin unravelled six years of sobriety; she began working as a sex worker to fund her substance use. McClenahan also struggled with heroin, and was arrested early November for forging a check during a binge. She had been missing since December 18.

McClenahan had a passion for Winnie the Pooh and loved to attend auctions and yard sales. "She was always the one who would help the neighbors, she was always real giving," said her brother, Patrick McClenahan.

She married four times and had a son. Her sister, Kathy Lloyd, a teacher in Spokane, said an addiction to painkillers Shawn took for an arm injury led to heroin and a life on the streets.

She had worked at a hospital laboratory, but had to quit because of the injury. "I told her that I was really, truly worried about her safety," said Lloyd. "She said, ‘Don't worry, I can take care of myself.’ I believed her."

In early December 1997, Lloyd received a birthday card from her sister, telling her how hard it was on the streets. But the card bore good news, too: Shawn had been accepted into a methadone program and was determined to leave her life of drugs. Then Christmas arrived and Lloyd didn't hear from her sister. "We did everything humanely possible to get Shawn away from drugs," she said. "She wasn't working on Sprague because she wanted to."

Laurie Wason bred and trained Rottweilers. She also operated an adult-family home and was licensed by the state.

Sunny Gail Oster
On February 8, 1998, Sunny Oster, 41, was found shot to death, in an identical manner as McClenahan and Wason, in a rural area of Spokane. Oster, a mother of two, was last seen in October; she disappeared the day after completing a drug treatment program.

Linda Marie Maybin
On April 1, 1998, the remains of Linda Maybin, 34, also known as "Barefoot Linda," was found in Spokane, just 100 yards from the bodies of Shawn McClenahan and Laurie Wason. She was shot once and had two plastic bags covering her head. Maybin had been working as a sex worker and had been missing since November 22, 1997.

Melody Ann Murfin
On May 20, 1998, Melody Murfin, 43, went missing. She was considered a victim of the same killer, due to her history and association with other victims, but her body was not discovered until six months after Yates' arrest and subsequent confession. She was buried beneath his bedroom window.

Michelyn Joann Derning
On July 7, 1998, Michelyn Derning, 47, was found shot once in the head in Spokane. The .25 caliber bullet casing was still in her hair. She was found nude and partially obscured by a hot tub cover.

Michelyn Derning was the daughter of a Marine Corps colonel. She grew up a military brat, graduating from high school in Virginia and attending Palomar College in California before moving to nearby San Diego to be an executive secretary.

She married and had a son, but drugs cost her her marriage. She lost custody of her son. She moved to Spokane in 1997, working in a variety of jobs, from ranch hand to nursing assistant. At one point, she renewed a friendship with a computer instructor she had met in San Diego.

He helped her find an apartment and befriended her but later moved away to Arizona.

Christine Smith
On August 1, 1998, Christine Smith filed a police report for assault and robbery after she was hit in the head during a sex act. She described the man as about 50 years old, 5'10" tall, 175 pounds, with sandy blond hair. His vehicle was described as a 70s era black van with an exterior yellow/orange stripe, bucket seats, wood panelling, and a raised bed. Smith also told police the man told her he was a National Guard helicopter pilot and had five children. Police discovered bullet fragments in her hair; Smith was unaware that she had actually been shot. Upon seeing Yates' photo in the newspaper following his arrest, Smith contacted police and identified Yates as the man who assaulted her. She is the only known survivor of Yates' crimes.

On September 19, 1998, Yates was asked to give a DNA sample to Spokane police after being stopped. He refused, stating that it was too extreme of a request for a "family man".

Connie Ellis-LaFontaine

On October 13, 1998, the body of Connie Ellis-LaFontaine, 35, was found in a ditch in Tacoma. She was shot once in the head and had three plastic bags covering her head. She previously worked as a hairdresser in Spokane, but fell into drugs and sex work six years after she moved, following the death of her son, who was waiting for a heart transplant.

Ellis was Chippewa and the eldest of five children. Ellis grew up on Turtle Mountain Indian Reservation. Her mother moved to Spokane when Ellis was still in high school, and Ellis moved between family in Washington state and North Dakota. At age 17, she worked as a secretary for a tribal organization. She became the mother of a daughter early in life and suffered an abusive marriage.

Of her three children, only her daughter Angel survives.

Ellis lost both her sons in childhood - one as a baby to sudden infant death syndrome, the other to a heart condition at age 11, in 1996. The year prior, her mother died.

Emil LaFontaine, Ellis’ father, said he believes the boy's death contributed to Ellis' struggles with heroin. "She was devastated by that." Ellis studied cosmetology and planned to be a hair stylist. She tried to get into treatment for her addiction problem, her father said, "but it just didn't work."

== Convictions and appeals ==
Yates was arrested on April 18, 2000, for the murder of Jennifer Joseph. After his arrest, a search warrant was executed on a white 1977 Chevrolet Corvette that he had previously owned. A white Corvette had been identified as the vehicle in which one of the victims had last been seen. Coincidentally, Yates had been pulled over in this vehicle while the task force was searching for it, but the field interview report was misread as saying "Camaro", not "Corvette," thus the incident was not realized until after Yates had been arrested.

After searching the Corvette, police discovered blood that they linked to Jennifer Joseph, and DNA from Yates that they then tied to 12 other victims. In 2000, he was charged with 13 counts of first-degree murder and one count of attempted first-degree murder in Spokane County Superior Court. As part of a plea bargain, Yates confessed to the murders to avoid the death penalty. He was sentenced to 408 years in prison. Charges were dropped without prejudice in the murder of Shawn McClenahan so that, if Yates appealed his other guilty sentences, he could be tried for her murder and possibly sentenced to death. Following his sentencing hearing, Yates made a statement apologizing to the families of all the victims he had killed.

In 2001 Yates was charged in Pierce County, Washington, with the murders of two additional women. The prosecution sought the death penalty for the deaths of Melinda L. Mercer in 1997, and Connie Ellis in 1998, which were thought to be linked to the killings in Spokane County. On September 19, 2002, Yates was convicted of those murders and subsequently sentenced to death by lethal injection on October 3, 2002.

The 2002 death sentence was appealed on grounds that Yates believed his 2000 plea bargain to be "all-encompassing", and that a life sentence for 13 murders and a death sentence for two constituted "disproportionate, freakish, wanton and random" application of the death penalty. The arguments were rejected in 2007 by the Washington Supreme Court. A September 19, 2008 execution date was stayed by Chief Justice Gerry L. Alexander pending additional appeals.

In 2013, Yates's attorneys filed a habeas corpus petition in federal district court, stating that Yates is mentally ill and, "through no fault of his own ... suffers from a severe paraphilic disorder" that predisposed him to commit murder. The still-pending motion is regarded as a "long shot" by most observers. "I don't think Mr. Yates helps his cause by relying on the fact that he's a necrophiliac," said Pierce County Prosecutor Mark Lindquist.

Yates remains incarcerated at the Washington State Penitentiary. His case was further complicated by Washington Governor Jay Inslee's 2013 declaration that he would not sign death warrants for anyone on death row while he is in office. Inslee cited the high cost of the appeals process, the randomness with which death sentences are sought, and a lack of evidence that the penalty serves as a deterrent to other criminals.

In July 2015, the Washington Supreme Court once again rejected an effort by Yates to overturn his conviction and death sentence. After the Washington State Supreme Court ruled in 2018 that the death penalty violated the state constitution, Yates's death sentence, as well as that of Washington's other death row inmates, was commuted to life in prison without the possibility of parole.

== Victims ==
Yates had killed the following individuals:

Name	Date of murder	Date of discovery
Patrick Allen Oliver	July 13, 1975	July 14, 1975
Susan Patricia Savage	July 13, 1975	July 14, 1975
Stacy Elizabeth Hawn	July 7, 1988	December 28, 1988
Shannon Rene Zielinski	May 27, 1996	June 14, 1996
Heather Louise Hernandez	August 21, 1997	August 26, 1997
Jennifer Ann Joseph	August 16, 1997	August 26, 1997
Darla Sue Scott	September 30 or October 1, 1997	November 5, 1997
Melinda Lee Mercer	December 6, 1997	December 7, 1997
Shawn Lynette Johnson	October 17, 1997	December 18, 1997
Shawn Ann McClenahan	December 18, 1997	December 26, 1997
Laurie Page Wason	November 3, 1997	December 26, 1997
Sunny Gail Oster	November 1, 1997	February 8, 1998
Linda Marie Maybin	November 21, 1997	April 1, 1998
Melody Ann Murfin	May 20, 1998	October 18, 2000
Michelyn Joann Derning	July 4, 1998	July 7, 1998
Connie Lynn Ellis-LaFontaine	September 17, 1998	October 13, 1998

== See also ==
- List of serial killers in the United States
- List of serial killers by number of victims
- Donna Perry (serial killer)

== Works cited ==
- Morlin, Bill; White, Jeanette (2001). Bad Trick : The Hunt for Spokane's Serial Killer. Spokane, WA: New Media Ventures, Inc. ISBN 9780923910181. OCLC 48369684.
