= List of people executed in the United States in 2010 =

Forty-six people, forty-five male and one female, were executed in the United States in 2010, forty-four by lethal injection, one (Paul Warner Powell) by electrocution, and one (Ronnie Lee Gardner) by firing squad. Seventeen of them were in the state of Texas. Washington carried out its last execution (Cal Brown) before abolishing capital punishment in 2018.

== List of people executed in the United States in 2010 ==
No.	Date of execution	Name	Age of person			Gender	Ethnicity	State	Method	Ref.
No.	Date of execution	Name	At execution	At offense	Age difference	Gender	Ethnicity	State	Method	Ref.
1	January 7, 2010	Vernon Lamont Smith	37	21	16	Male	Black	Ohio	Lethal injection	
2	January 7, 2010	Kenneth Mosley	51	38	13	Male	Black	Texas	Lethal injection	
3	January 7, 2010	Gerald James Bordelon	47	40	7	Male	White	Louisiana	Lethal injection	
4	January 12, 2010	Gary James Johnson	59	35	24	Male	White	Texas	Lethal injection	
5	January 14, 2010	Julius Recardo Young	60	44	16	Male	Black	Oklahoma	Lethal injection	
6	February 4, 2010	Mark Aaron Brown	37	21	16	Male	Black	Ohio	Lethal injection	
7	February 16, 2010	Martin Edward Grossman	45	19	26	Male	White	Florida	Lethal injection	
8	March 2, 2010	Michael Adam Sigala	32	22	10	Male	Hispanic	Texas	Lethal injection	
9	March 11, 2010	Joshua Maxwell	31	22	9	Male	White	Texas	Lethal injection	
10	March 16, 2010	Lawrence Raymond Reynolds Jr.	43	27	16	Male	White	Ohio	Lethal injection	
11	March 18, 2010	Paul Warner Powell	31	20	11	Male	White	Virginia	Electrocution	
12	March 30, 2010	Franklin DeWayne Alix	34	22	12	Male	Black	Texas	Lethal injection	
13	April 20, 2010	Darryl M. Durr	46	24	22	Male	Black	Ohio	Lethal injection	
14	April 22, 2010	William Josef Berkley	31	21	10	Male	White	Texas	Lethal injection	
15	April 27, 2010	Samuel Bustamante	40	28	12	Male	Hispanic	Texas	Lethal injection	
16	May 12, 2010	Kevin Scott Varga	41	29	12	Male	White	Texas	Lethal injection	
17	May 13, 2010	Michael Francis Beuke	48	21	27	Male	White	Ohio	Lethal injection	
18	May 13, 2010	Billy John Galloway	41	29	12	Male	White	Texas	Lethal injection	
19	May 19, 2010	Rogelio Reyes Cannady	37	21	16	Male	Hispanic	Texas	Lethal injection	
20	May 19, 2010	Paul Everette Woodward	62	38	24	Male	White	Mississippi	Lethal injection	
21	May 20, 2010	Gerald James Holland	72	49	23	Male	White	Mississippi	Lethal injection	
22	May 20, 2010	Darick Demorris Walker	37	24	13	Male	Black	Virginia	Lethal injection	
23	May 25, 2010	John Avalos Alba	54	36	18	Male	Hispanic	Texas	Lethal injection	
24	May 27, 2010	Thomas Warren Whisenhant	63	29	34	Male	White	Alabama	Lethal injection	
25	June 2, 2010	George Alarick Jones	36	19	17	Male	Black	Texas	Lethal injection	
26	June 9, 2010	Melbert Ray Ford Jr.	49	25	24	Male	White	Georgia	Lethal injection	
27	June 10, 2010	John Forrest Parker	42	19	23	Male	White	Alabama	Lethal injection	
28	June 15, 2010	David Lee Powell	59	27	32	Male	White	Texas	Lethal injection	
29	June 18, 2010	Ronnie Lee Gardner	49	24	25	Male	White	Utah	Firing squad	
30	July 1, 2010	Michael James Perry	28	19	9	Male	White	Texas	Lethal injection	
31	July 13, 2010	William L. Garner	37	19	18	Male	Black	Ohio	Lethal injection	
32	July 20, 2010	Derrick Leon Jackson	42	20	22	Male	Black	Texas	Lethal injection	
33	July 21, 2010	Joseph Daniel Burns	42	26	16	Male	White	Mississippi	Lethal injection	
34	August 10, 2010	Roderick Davie	38	19	19	Male	Black	Ohio	Lethal injection	
35	August 12, 2010	Michael Jeffrey Land	41	22	19	Male	White	Alabama	Lethal injection	
36	August 17, 2010	Peter Anthony Cantu	35	18	17	Male	Hispanic	Texas	Lethal injection	
37	September 9, 2010	Holly Wood	50	33	17	Male	Black	Alabama	Lethal injection	
38	September 10, 2010	Cal Coburn Brown	52	33	19	Male	White	Washington	Lethal injection	
39	September 23, 2010	Teresa Wilson Bean Lewis	41	33	8	Female	White	Virginia	Lethal injection	
40	September 27, 2010	Brandon Joseph Rhode	31	18	13	Male	White	Georgia	Lethal injection	
41	October 6, 2010	Michael W. Benge	49	31	18	Male	White	Ohio	Lethal injection	
42	October 14, 2010	Donald Ray Wackerly II	41	26	15	Male	White	Oklahoma	Lethal injection	
43	October 21, 2010	Larry Wayne Wooten	51	37	14	Male	Black	Texas	Lethal injection	
44	October 26, 2010	Jeffrey Timothy Landrigan	50	29	21	Male	Native American	Arizona	Lethal injection	
45	November 4, 2010	Phillip D. Hallford	63	39	24	Male	White	Alabama	Lethal injection	
46	December 16, 2010	John David Duty	58	49	9	Male	White	Oklahoma	Lethal injection	
		Average:	45 years	28 years	17 years					

== Demographics ==
Gender
Male	45	98%
Female	1	2%
Ethnicity
White	27	59%
Black	13	28%
Hispanic	5	11%
Native American	1	2%
State
Texas	17	37%
Ohio	8	17%
Alabama	5	11%
Mississippi	3	7%
Oklahoma	3	7%
Virginia	3	7%
Georgia	2	4%
Arizona	1	2%
Florida	1	2%
Louisiana	1	2%
Utah	1	2%
Washington	1	2%
Method
Lethal injection	44	96%
Electrocution	1	2%
Firing squad	1	2%
Month
January	5	11%
February	2	4%
March	5	11%
April	3	7%
May	9	20%
June	5	11%
July	4	9%
August	3	7%
September	4	9%
October	4	9%
November	1	2%
December	1	2%
Age
20–29	1	2%
30–39	14	30%
40–49	17	37%
50–59	9	20%
60–69	4	9%
70–79	1	2%
Total	46	100%

== Executions in recent years ==
Number of executions
2011	43
2010	46
2009	52
Total	141

== See also ==
- List of death row inmates in the United States
- List of most recent executions by jurisdiction
- List of people scheduled to be executed in the United States
- List of women executed in the United States since 1976

Preceded by 2009	List of people executed in the United States in 2010	Succeeded by 2011
