= James Homer Elledge =

American murderer (1942–2001)

- Born: December 9, 1942; United States
- Died: August 28, 2001 (aged 58); Washington State Penitentiary, Washington, U.S.
- Status: Executed by lethal injection
- Convictions: Aggravated first degree murder First degree murder
- Penalty: Death

Details
- Victims: 2
- Date: 1974-April 18, 1998
- Country: United States
- State: Washington

James Homer Elledge (December 9, 1942 – August 28, 2001) was an American murderer who was executed by lethal injection in Washington State Penitentiary for the murder of 47-year-old Eloise Jane Fitzner while on parole for another murder. The case raised questions before and after the execution about how capital punishment was applied in Washington state, especially in cases where a defendant refused to present a defense in the penalty phase and refused to allow the filing of any appeals.

== Crimes ==
Elledge had four prior convictions as a juvenile for breaking and entering theft.

In 1964, Elledge robbed a Western Union office in Albuquerque, New Mexico. During this robbery, he also kidnapped a female attendant. He was sentenced to prison in Santa Fe, New Mexico and, after his parole, he moved to Seattle, Washington, where he killed motel manager Bertha Lush in 1974 by beating her to death with a ball-peen hammer in an argument over his bill. While in prison for that crime, he was paroled three times, the last of which happened in August 1995.

On April 18, 1998, Elledge invited Eloise Fitzner and her friend, only referred to as "S.C.", into a Bible-study room of a church where he worked as a custodian. After closing the door, he pulled a knife and bound the two women's wrists and ankles. He put a sweatshirt over S.C.'s head and made her face the wall. When S.C. heard struggling behind her, she tried to see what was happening. Elledge noticed this and threatened to kill S.C. next if she did not remain faced to the wall. Elledge first strangled Ms. Fitzner with his hands and then, not sure if she was dead, he fatally stabbed her in the neck. After hiding the body, Elledge abducted S.C. and drove them home in Ms. Fitzner's car. At his home, he sexually assaulted S.C. and released her the following day. S.C. immediately went to police. Elledge was arrested two days later and confessed.

== Trial and execution ==
On May 27, 1998, Elledge pleaded guilty to aggravated first degree murder. He forbade his lawyer from presenting any defense during the penalty phase. When he testified himself he said: "that there is a very wicked part of me. And this wicked part of me needs to die." On July 28, 1998, Elledge was sentenced to death. Waiving all his rights to appeal, was executed by lethal injection on August 28, 2001, at Washington State Penitentiary, becoming only the fourth person to be executed since the restoration of capital punishment in Washington state in 1981. Elledge requested a last meal of eggs, bacon, waffles, sweet roll, cereal and orange juice, but declined to eat it. His actual last meal was a breakfast of apple juice, oatmeal, toast, hash browns, coffee and eggs. He gave no last words.

His confession, refusal to assist his own defense, and his successful efforts to prevent 3rd party groups from appealing on his behalf raised issues of state assisted suicide, and public debate over how Washington state selected which prisoners would be executed.

== See also ==
- Capital punishment in Washington (state)
- Capital punishment in the United States
- List of people executed in Washington
- List of people executed in the United States in 2001

== General references ==
- Rule, Ann (2003). Last Dance, Last Chance and Other True Cases: Ann Rule's Crime Files Vol:8. Pocket Books. ISBN 0-7434-2406-9.
- James Homer Elledge. Clark County Prosecutor. Retrieved on 2007-08-17.
- Rebekah Denn. Some killers more than ready to die. Seattle Post-Intelligencer (2001-08-07). Retrieved on 2007-08-17.
- Rebekah Denn. Petition to spare Elledge rejected. Seattle Post-Intelligencer (2001-08-07). Retrieved on 2007-08-17.
- Preusch, Matthew (August 29, 2001). "National Briefing | Northwest: Washington: Execution Of Killer". The New York Times.

Preceded by Jeremy Vargas Sagastegui	Executions carried out in Washington State	Succeeded by Cal Coburn Brown
