= Capital punishment in Washington =

Capital punishment in Washington may refer to:

- Capital punishment in Washington (state)
- Capital punishment in Washington, D.C.
