= Cal Brown =

American convicted murderer and last person executed in the state of Washington

Cal Coburn Brown
- 2009 mugshot of Cal Coburn Brown
- Born: April 16, 1958; San Jose, California
- Died: September 10, 2010 (aged 52); Washington State Penitentiary, Washington, U.S.
- Known for: Last person to be executed by the state of Washington
- Status: Executed by lethal injection
- Convictions: Aggravated first degree murder Attempted first degree murder Torture; Aggravated mayhem Assault with a deadly weapon Attempted first degree assault Second degree assault False imprisonment First degree robbery Grand theft
- Penalty: Death

Cal Coburn Brown (April 16, 1958 – September 10, 2010) was an American convicted murderer who was found guilty of the 1991 carjacking, rape and murder of Holly Washa in Washington. On May 23, 1991, in King County, Washington, Brown, who was out on parole for a prior offense, had carjacked Washa at knifepoint. Over the next 36 hours, Washa was robbed, raped and tortured by Brown, who ultimately stabbed and strangled her to death. Brown later confessed to the murder while in custody for assaulting another woman in California, and was subsequently charged with the crime. He was found guilty of aggravated murder and sentenced to death and executed on September 10, 2010. Brown was the last person to be put to death in the state of Washington before capital punishment was ruled unconstitutional in 2018 and formally abolished in the state in 2023.

== Background ==
Cal Coburn Brown, born on April 16, 1958, originated from San Jose, California. Brown was said to have a troubled childhood, as his mother reportedly neglected him as an infant, and during his early childhood years, Brown was said to exhibit unusual behaviours of agitation. Brown's mother also married five times, and during her second marriage, both Brown and his mother suffered from physical and psychological abuse inflicted by his stepfather. One psychiatric expert at Brown's murder trial diagnosed him with anti-social personality disorder, sexual sadism, and manic syndrome, while another diagnosed him with attention deficit disorder and conduct disorder as a result of his childhood and traumatic birth experience.

During his adulthood, Brown had a lengthy history of violence against women. In 1977, Brown was convicted of assaulting a woman with a knife at a shopping mall in California. After serving an unspecified sentence in that case, Brown also assaulted a woman in Oregon in 1984, and served the minimum sentence of 7 1/2 years in prison before he was released on parole in March 1991. In fact, Peter Sandrock Jr., the former prosecutor who previously handled Brown's Oregon case, had urged the parole board to not release Brown early out of fear that he could re-offend and cited him as among the most dangerous criminals he ever encountered.

== Murder of Holly Washa ==
On May 20, 1991, two months after he was paroled from Oregon State Penitentiary, Brown violated the terms of his parole by travelling to Washington. As a result, a warrant of arrest was issued for Brown. On the morning of May 23, 1991, nearby Seattle-Tacoma Airport in King County, Washington, 21-year-old Holly Washa, who had just resigned from her part-time job at a hotel, encountered Brown while she was driving out of the hotel's parking lot. Washa stopped the car after Brown signalled to her that something was wrong with one of her car tires, and at that point, Brown forcibly entered the car and held Washa at knifepoint, forcing her to go to a bank to withdraw money and cash a $350 check.

After withdrawing the money, Brown also tied up Washa's hands with her purse strap and forced her into the passenger seat, and even bought handcuffs. Afterwards, Brown confined Washa inside his motel room for the next 34 hours, during which he repeatedly raped her. Apart from raping Washa, Brown also tortured Washa by burning her with a cigarette, hair dryer and electrical cord. Brown also used a baseball bat to beat up Washa, and used a bottle to rape Washa.

Washa was later forced into the trunk of her car, and eventually, in order to silence her, Brown slit her throat thrice and even stabbed her several times in the chest and abdomen. After disposing of her body, Brown fled to California by flight, and he was arrested for assaulting and attempting to rape and kill another woman in a subsequent case. While he was under investigation for that separate case, Brown confessed to the Palm Springs police officers that he was involved in the murder of Washa, and additionally informed the authorities the location of Washa's corpse, which was left inside the trunk of her car.

== Death penalty trial ==
On June 5, 1991, Brown was officially charged with aggravated first-degree murder by the Washington state authorities.

Prior to his trial in Washington for the murder of Washa, Brown was convicted of attempted first-degree murder after pleading guilty in a California state court and on November 26, 1991, he was sentenced to life imprisonment.

In February 1992, Brown was extradited back from California to Washington, and first arraigned in court for the murder charge. Brown submitted a plea of not guilty to the charge.

On March 24, 1992, King County Prosecuting Attorney Norm Maleng announced that he would seek the death penalty for Brown.

In September 1992, a judge ruled that Brown's taped confession to the California police was admissible in court. Brown eventually stood trial in December 1993.

On December 10, 1993, the jury found Brown guilty of aggravated first-degree murder for the death of Washa.

During sentencing submissions, the defence argued that while Brown had indeed killed Washa, he should not be sentenced to death based on humanitarian grounds, mainly centering around his troubled childhood and past abuse. However, the prosecution rebutted that this should not be an excuse for Brown to kill another person in cold blood and also cited that the murder was not only premeditated but was also done in the course of robbery and rape and kidnapping.

On December 27, 1993, all 12 jurors unanimously decided to impose the death penalty for Brown.

On January 28, 1994, Cal Coburn Brown was formally sentenced to death by King County Superior Court Judge Ricardo S. Martinez.

== Appeals ==
On July 24, 1997, the Washington Supreme Court denied Brown's direct appeal against his death sentence. In its ruling, the justices found that Brown's death sentence was not disproportionate in light of his prior convictions for assault with a deadly weapon, grand theft, attempted assault in the first degree, assault in the second degree, attempted murder in the first degree, aggravated mayhem, torture, false imprisonment, and robbery in the first degree.

On March 9, 1998, the U.S. Supreme Court rejected Brown's appeal against his death sentence.

A month later, on April 8, 1998, an execution date was set for Brown, scheduling him to be executed on May 13, 1998. However, the execution never proceeded as planned and Brown remained on death row. Brown was one of 13 inmates incarcerated on Washington's death row as of October 1998.

On December 8, 2005, the 9th Circuit Court of Appeals unanimously allowed the appeal of Brown and overturned his death sentence, after they found that the original trial judge had improperly excluded a juror in his trial. That particular juror did not express opposition to the death penalty but agreed that mitigating factors as childhood trauma or mental illness could be considered, and it led to him being disqualified. The court found that the juror was unfairly disqualified and hence agreed that Brown's death sentence should not stand.

On January 12, 2007, the U.S. Supreme Court allowed the prosecution's appeal to reinstate the death sentence of Brown, and agreed that they would review Brown's case to determine if his death sentence should be restored.

On June 4, 2007, by a majority ruling of 5–4, the U.S. Supreme Court restored the death sentence of Brown. The majority found that the original trial judge had properly used his discretion to excuse the potential juror during the selection stage, given that the said juror had expressed he would vote for the death penalty only if the defendant were in the position to kill again, and it would have affected the jury's ability to impartially impose a potential death sentence. As for the minority, they cited in their dissenting judgement that the majority's ruling potentially wiped out the possibility of death penalty opponents becoming jurors, specifically those who demonstrated their willingness to adhere to the law and not decide the sentence based on their personal beliefs. The court's decision, titled Uttecht v. Brown, was a landmark ruling that upheld the judges' prerogative to decide if a juror candidate who opposed capital punishment could set aside his/her opinions and was open to impose the death sentence for the offender.

After reinstating Brown's death sentence, the U.S. Supreme Court sent the case back to the 9th Circuit Court of Appeals for another review. On June 27, 2008, the 9th Circuit Court of Appeals upheld Brown's conviction and death sentence.

== 2009 execution stay ==
On January 29, 2009, the Washington State Department of Corrections announced that Brown's death sentence would be carried out on March 13, 2009, after a federal appellate court lifted the stay order and allowed an execution date to be set for Brown.

On March 10, 2009, the Washington Supreme Court dismissed Brown's appeal to delay his upcoming execution.

On March 11, 2009, Thurston County Superior Court Judge Chris Wickham dismissed Brown's appeal, refusing his request to join an upcoming legal challenge against the state's execution protocols.

On March 12, 2009, eight hours before Brown was slated to be executed, the Washington Supreme Court granted him an indefinite stay of execution in light of a pending legal challenge against the constitutionality of the state's lethal injection protocols.

Ultimately, the state would reform its execution protocols and introduced a one-drug lethal injection method to replace its previous triple-drug lethal injection method, and in July 2009, Thurston County Superior Court Judge Chris Wickham found that the new method did not constitute as "cruel and unusual punishment" and hence dismissed the legal challenge, in which Brown was one of the three plaintiffs filing the lawsuit.

== Execution ==
=== Second death warrant and final appeals ===
On July 28, 2010, the Washington Supreme Court overturned the stay order and issued a second death warrant for Brown, whose new execution date was September 10, 2010. King County Prosecuting Attorney Dan Satterberg responded to the death warrant by describing Brown as among the "worst of the worst criminals" and his death sentence should be carried out.

On August 31, 2010, U.S. District Judge John C. Coughenour dismissed the appeal of Brown to halt his impending execution.

On September 7, 2010, King County Superior Court Judge Sharon Armstrong denied Brown's application for a stay of execution. Brown's separate appeal to the 9th Circuit Court of Appeals was also rejected, but simultaneously, Brown filed another appeal to the Washington Supreme Court to stay his execution, citing that his psychiatric condition was not adequately taken into account during his sentencing for the murder of Washa.

On September 8, 2010, Governor Christine Gregoire rejected Brown's clemency petition and declined to commute his death sentence to life without parole. On that same day, the Washington Supreme Court denied Brown's appeal to stay his execution.

On September 9, 2010, the 9th Circuit Court of Appeals dismissed Brown's subsequent appeal to stop his upcoming execution. Ultimately, the U.S. Supreme Court denied Brown's final appeal against his death sentence.

=== Lethal injection ===
On September 10, 2010, Brown was put to death by lethal injection at the age of 52 in the Washington State Penitentiary. Reports revealed that the father, brother and two sisters of Washa were present to witness the execution of Brown, who did not apologize to the family in his final statement, which he used to protest that he was given the death sentence for the murder of a single victim in contrast to infamous serial killer Gary Ridgway, who served 48 life sentences for the murders of multiple people. Washa's father stated that the family finally found closure after the execution of his daughter's killer.

Prior to his execution, Brown was observed to be resigned to his fate, and spent his last day conversing with his family and lawyers on the phone. Brown also ordered a combination meat pizza, apple pie, coffee and milk as his last meal. Brown was the first criminal in Washington to be executed via a one-drug lethal injection method, and the state's first execution in nine years since the 2001 execution of convicted murderer James Homer Elledge. Brown was also the 78th person executed in Washington since 1904.

Several anti-death penalty advocates showed up to protest against Brown's execution, and Judith Kay, professor of religion at the University of Puget Sound, cited her opposition to capital punishment and pointed out that Brown was sentenced to death for murdering one victim while Ridgway, the serial killer, escaped the death penalty and got life imprisonment for killing 48 victims.

=== Aftermath and abolition of capital punishment ===
In November 2010, two months after Brown was put to death, it was reported that the state of Washington had spent a total of $97,814.09 in order to carry out Brown's execution, including $75,862.59 in employee wages pertaining to the execution.

In 2014, four years after Brown was executed, Governor Jay Inslee issued a moratorium and suspended the use of capital punishment in Washington, citing that the death penalty was being inconsistently applied and there were too many flaws plaguing the death penalty system in the state.

On October 11, 2018, eight years after Brown's execution, the Washington Supreme Court unanimously ruled the death penalty unconstitutional. As a result, the death penalty was effectively repealed, and the state's remaining eight death row inmates had their sentences commuted to life imprisonment without the possibility of parole. Brown therefore became the fifth and last convict to be executed in Washington since 1993. Five years later, in April 2023, capital punishment was formally abolished when Governor Inslee signed legislation removing it from state law.

== See also ==
- Uttecht v. Brown
- Capital punishment in Washington (state)
- List of people executed by lethal injection
- List of people executed in Washington
- List of most recent executions by jurisdiction
- List of people executed in the United States in 2010

Preceded by James Homer Elledge	Executions carried out in Washington State	Succeeded by none
