= Katherine Beckett =

American sociologist

Katherine Beckett is an American sociologist known for researching the United States criminal justice system. She is a professor in the University of Washington's Law, Societies & Justice Program, as well as in the Department of Sociology there. She previously taught at Indiana University.

== Research ==
Beckett has researched racial disparities in the United States criminal justice system, such as the disproportionately high rates of drug arrests among racial minorities. She has also researched bans imposed on individuals by public parks, finding that most people disobey them. In October 2018, the Washington Supreme Court relied on a regression analysis a death row prisoner had commissioned from Beckett when it abolished the state's death penalty because of its unconstitutionally racist imposition.

== Other work ==
Beckett helped develop the Rethinking Punishment Radio Project, along with another podcast known as Cited.
