= Franklin DeWayne Alix =

American serial killer (1975–2010)

- Alix shortly before his execution
- Born: August 6, 1975; Harris County, Texas, U.S.
- Died: March 30, 2010 (aged 34); Huntsville Unit, Huntsville, Texas, U.S.
- Cause of death: Execution by lethal injection
- Convictions: Capital murder Unauthorized use of a motor vehicle Theft; Illegally carrying a weapon Robbery (9 counts)
- Penalty: Death

Details
- Victims: 4
- Span of crimes: August 8, 1997 – January 4, 1998
- Country: United States
- State: Texas
- Weapon: Pistol
- Date apprehended: January 6, 1998

Franklin DeWayne Alix (August 6, 1975 – March 30, 2010) was an American rapist, robber, kidnapper, and serial killer who committed at least four murders, two attempted murders, nine robberies, two rapes, and four kidnappings during a crime spree in the late 1990s. Most of his crimes occurred at apartment complexes in Houston, Texas. Alix was sentenced to death for one of the murders and executed in 2010.

== Early life ==
Alix was born in Harris County, Texas. As a child, he was active at his church; he sang in the choir and taught Sunday school. He later said he was raised in a strict household.

== Early crimes ==
In September 1992, Alix tried to steal a bus. He was arrested after a 10-minute chase and received a six-month sentence for theft.

On April 8, 1993, Alix stole a woman's car from her driveway. He was later arrested while driving the car. Alix received a three-year sentence for motor theft and was released from prison in 1996.

On July 11, 1996, he was stopped for jaywalking in Houston and was found to be illegally carrying a pistol and ammunition. He was convicted of illegally carrying a weapon and was sentenced to 70 days in jail.

== Crime spree ==
In August 1997, Alix embarked on a six-month violent crime spree in Houston. Over the course of the crime spree, he committed at least three murders. Alix committed most of his crimes at apartment complexes and kidnapped people by forcing them into car trunks on four occasions.

On August 8, Alix shot and killed 41-year-old Gregorio Ramirez during an attempted robbery in an apartment parking lot. His widow identified him as the shooter. On August 15, Alix pumped gas without paying. When he got stuck in traffic and the store owner confronted him, Alix punched the man in the face.

On September 2, Alix bumped into a woman's car. When she asked him for his insurance papers, he threw her to the ground and robbed her at gunpoint. He then fled after the woman started screaming and another woman said she was calling the police. On September 29, Alix robbed a woman and kidnapped her at gunpoint as she got out of her car in an apartment parking lot. After forcing her into her trunk and driving off, Alix pulled over and made the woman perform oral sex on him before fleeing.

On October 5, Alix shot and killed Selemawi Tewolde in an apartment parking lot. On October 13, he robbed a man at gunpoint at an apartment, and on November 30, robbed a man getting out of his car in an apartment parking lot and locked him in the trunk.

On December 6, Alix stopped a patrolling apartment security guard at gunpoint. He had the security guard turn around and run away. He then fired three shots, hitting the guard in the back. The man survived. On December 19, Alix shot and wounded a townhome security guard after searching for money. Later that day, Alix got out of a car to rob a man in an apartment parking lot. The man got in the car and drove away. He later found a woman in the trunk. The woman said she had been robbed and raped.

On January 3, Alix kidnapped 19-year-old Karyl Bridgeford. After forcing her into her car trunk and driving off, Alix threatened her and demanded money. Karyl told him he could take things from her home. Alix threatened Karyl with his gun, saying he would kill her and anyone else in the house if anything went wrong. Alix then searched the home and stole several electronics. He also raped Karyl. As he was ransacking the home, Karyl's 23-year-old brother Eric and his friend suddenly arrived. The two men fled, but Alix chased them, shooting and killing Eric. Later that day, Alix pulled over a woman in an apartment parking lot at gunpoint before robbing and kidnapping her. The woman was forced into her car trunk. Alix, who then started driving the car, released her half an hour later.

On January 4, Alix robbed a man walking home. Later that day, he robbed and fatally shot 34-year-old Christopher Thomas as he was listening to music in his car outside of his home.

== Arrest, trial, and execution ==
On January 6, 1998, officers in Houston arrested Alix. He confessed to killing Eric on videotape and led police to the weapon.

Alix was charged with capital murder for killing Eric. Prosecutors announced they would seek a death sentence for him. While in jail awaiting trial, Alix got into two fights with other inmates, one on April 6, 1998, and the other on May 27, 1998. Alix's trial started in August 1998. During the trial, he admitted to kidnapping Karyl but claimed the sex was consensual, the stolen items were gifts, and that he killed Eric in self defense. Alix was found guilty of capital murder on August 26, 1998.

During the sentencing phase, the prosecution introduced Alix's prior convictions and evidence of the other crimes he committed. They said he was the poster boy for capital murder and called him a "one-man crime wave". The defense had witnesses testify that Alix was kind when he was younger. One person described him as having been a "typical fun-loving teenager". Alix himself said he committed the crimes under duress, and that a man named Kevin Smith had threatened to kill him if he did not pay a drug debt.

Although Texas did not have life without parole at the time, the judge also allowed the defense to tell the jury that if they gave Alix a life sentence, he would not become eligible for parole for 40 years. This meant that Alix would have no chance of release until he was in his early 60s.

During his trial, Alix had several outbursts. At one point, he was removed from the courtroom. The jury ultimately recommended a death sentence, and Alix was formally sentenced to death on September 2, 1998. In 2006, the crime lab for Houston Police Department was caught in a controversy over complaints of bad police work and mishandled evidence in multiple cases. In Alix's case, his lawyers argued that DNA evidence did not conclusively connect him to Ramirez's murder. However, an appellate court ruled that this would not have changed the jury's decision, pointing to Alix's lengthy history of violence and other evidence.

Alix was interviewed on death row shortly before his execution. Referring to his alleged drug debt, he said he had wanted to do the right things in life, but got caught with a bad crowd. He admitted to killing Eric but claimed his gun went off after Eric charged at him. Alix said he did not want to die. He claimed he was remorseful, but said he would not apologize. Alix admitted to some of the robberies, but denied most of the other crimes, including the rapes and all of the other murders.

Alix was executed by lethal injection at the Huntsville Unit on March 30, 2010. He declined a last meal. Alix's last words were, "I am not the monster they made me out to be. I made lots of mistakes that took your son. I messed up, made poor choices. I'll take it to the grave, I will be at peace. It is what it is. I got peace in my heart." He was pronounced dead seven minutes later.

Bridgeford's sister and mother, as well as Thomas's father and sister, witnessed the execution. "Our lives are forever changed but we need to go on," said Bridgeford's mother, Janey. She said she took no pleasure in seeing Alix die and that she forgave him, but understood he might not admit to everything he did. Janey brought a photo of her son to the witness room. "Every photo has been of Alix", she said. "I wanted to put a face to this." Janey said her family had been through a lot of pain and it took two years before she could return to work. Thomas's sister, Fernellifa Jolivette, said she had to forgive Alix to find peace with herself.

== See also ==
- Capital punishment in Texas
- List of people executed in Texas, 2010–2019
- List of people executed in the United States in 2010
- List of serial killers in the United States
