= Paul Warner Powell =

American murderer (1978–2010)

- Born: April 13, 1978; Fairfax, Virginia, U.S.
- Died: March 18, 2010 (aged 31); Greensville Correctional Center, Virginia, U.S.
- Status: Executed by electrocution
- Motive: White supremacy
- Convictions: Capital murder Attempted capital murder Abduction; Rape
- Penalty: Death

Details
- Victims: Stacie Reed, 16 (murdered); Kristie Reed, 14
- Date: January 29, 1999
- State: Virginia

Paul Warner Powell (April 13, 1978 – March 18, 2010) was an American white supremacist who was executed for the murder of 16-year-old Stacie Reed in 1999 after learning that she had a black boyfriend. He also raped, strangled, and stabbed Stacie’s sister Kristie, 14, who survived. Following the vacation of his capital murder conviction on appeal, Powell wrote letters boasting about his crimes under the mistaken belief that he was exempt from punishment by the principle of double jeopardy. In reality, Powell was not exempt from double jeopardy since he had not actually been acquitted. His letters were used as evidence against him in a second trial that resulted in his execution in 2010.

== History ==
On January 29, 1999, in Manassas, Virginia, 20-year-old Powell killed his 16-year-old friend, Stacie Reed. He first attempted to rape her after learning Stacie's current boyfriend was black. Powell was "a self-avowed racist and white supremacist" who objected to interracial relationships. After Stacie fought him off, he stabbed her in the chest, puncturing her heart. Powell then drank iced tea and smoked, while waiting for Kristie, Stacie's 14-year-old sister, to come home from school.

When Kristie arrived, Powell ordered her to the basement and raped her. Interrupted by someone at the front door, he dressed and tied the girl up. While he was gone, Kristie untied her hands and tried unsuccessfully to hide or escape. Powell returned to the basement, removed Kristie's eyeglasses, and strangled her until she was unconscious. He stabbed her in the stomach, and the knife stopped within a centimeter of her aorta. He then slashed her neck numerous times; the wounds later required 61 sutures. She had multiple stab wounds to her neck, abdomen and both wrists. Her stepfather, Robert Culver, arrived home at 4:15 p.m. He found Stacie's body and searched the house for the phone to call police. He then found Kristie bleeding in the basement. She ultimately survived and testified against Powell at his trial.

== Legal proceedings and claim of double jeopardy ==
Powell was convicted of capital murder and sentenced to death, but the verdict was thrown out on appeal by the Virginia Supreme Court. The court decided that there was insufficient evidence to prove that Powell attempted to rape Stacie and that there were no other aggravating factors that would warrant a death sentence; the fact that Kristie had been raped could not serve as a basis for making Stacie's killing a capital murder. The conviction for the rape of Kristie Reed was upheld, and Powell was given three life sentences. He would have become eligible for parole at the age of 60 in 2038.

Powell, believing that he no longer faced execution due to double jeopardy, then wrote an abusive letter to the prosecutor and admitted that he attempted to rape Stacie and boasted about his crimes in detail, among several other taunting or threatening letters he sent to the victims' family. The letter to the prosecutor read, in part: "Since I have already been indicted on first degree murder and the Va. Supreme Court said that I can't be charged with capital murder again, I figured I would tell you the rest of what happened on Jan. 29, 1999, to show you how stupid all of y'all . . . are." He detailed how he told Stacie she could "do it the easy way or the hard way" and how she continued to resist him. He then stabbed her and stomped on her neck until she stopped breathing. "I guess I forgot to mention these events when I was being questioned. Ha Ha! ... Do you just hate yourself for being so stupid and for fuckin' up and saving me?"

In fact, the principle of double jeopardy did not apply, since although his capital murder verdict had been vacated, he had not been acquitted of the criminal charge and was still eligible to be retried. Using the letter that Powell wrote, prosecutors indicted him again for the attempted rape and murder of Stacie Reed. Powell was once again convicted and sentenced to death.

== Execution ==
Powell chose to be executed by the electric chair instead of lethal injection. He was executed on March 18, 2010, at Greensville Correctional Center. Powell did not make a final statement; when asked if he wished to do so, he remained silent and stared at the ceiling. The day before his execution, however, Powell had spoken to Reed's family by phone and acknowledged the crime "was a senseless and pointless thing" and apologized.

== See also ==
- Capital punishment in the United States
- Capital punishment in Virginia
- List of people executed in the United States in 2010
- List of people executed in Virginia
