= Washington State Penitentiary =

Men's prison in Walla Walla, Washington

Washington State Penitentiary (WSP)
- Location in Washington
- Location: Walla Walla; 46°4′41″N 118°21′32″W
- Status: Operational
- Security class: Minimum, Medium, Close, Maximum
- Capacity: 2,439
- Opened: 1886
- Managed by: Washington State Department of Corrections
- Warden: Rob Jackson, Superintendent
- Website: www.doc.wa.gov/corrections/incarceration/prisons/wsp.htm

Washington State Penitentiary (also called the Walla Walla State Penitentiary) is a Washington State Department of Corrections men's prison located in Walla Walla, Washington. With an operating capacity of 2,439, it is the third largest prison in the state behind the Monroe Correctional Complex with 3,100 total capacity and Coyote Ridge Corrections Center at 2,468. It opened in 1886, three years before statehood.

It was the site of Washington State's death row and where executions were carried out, until the Washington Supreme Court ruled the state's death penalty statute unconstitutional on October 11, 2018, thereby abolishing capital punishment in the state. The last execution, however took place in 2010. Methods for execution were lethal injection and hanging.

Located at 1313 N. 13th Avenue, it is commonly known as "the Walls" among inmates and "The Pen" to the locals. The penitentiary is sometimes known as "Concrete Mama", from a book with the same title by Ethan Hoffman and John McCoy. Elsewhere within Washington, and also to an extent in the surrounding states, the name Walla Walla is a metonym for the penitentiary. The penitentiary was the subject of the song "Walla Walla" by American punk rock band The Offspring.

== History ==
Washington State Penitentiary is the oldest operational prison in Washington State and among the oldest operational prisons in the US.

During the 1880s, Washington's territorial legislature sought to build a state prison to satisfy a requirement for eventual statehood. The territory's prison at the time, the privately owned Seatco Prison, had "poor living conditions" and was nicknamed "The Seatco Dungeon" and "Hell on Earth". Its inmates performed penal labor and manufactured goods while being denied visitation rights and access to clergy. Walla Walla's city government began lobbying for a territory-funded institution, and after Levi Ankeny, a local wealthy business man, donated 160-acres for the site in 1886, the legislators approved the Washington Territorial Prison. On May 11, 1887, the first 10 prisoners arrived from Seatco.

Guards were placed on the facility's walls after two prisoners escaped shortly after it was opened, on July 4, 1887. They only made it a few miles before being recaptured. There have been several more escapes since, including a seized supply train in 1891, a riot that left nine dead in 1934, 10 who tunneled under the wall in 1955, and John Allen Lamb, who sawed his way out in 1997. In 1887, the facility had its first incarcerated woman, a housewife who had committed grand larceny, but there were no accommodations suitable for a woman. The prison later converted the hospital quarters to accommodate four women, and later built a separate facility. The remaining Seatco inmates were transferred in 1888, and the facility was shut down, and the town changed its name to "Bucoda". When Washington became a state in 1889, the facility officially became the Washington State Penitentiary, but inmates nicknamed it "The Hill", "The Joint", "The Walls", and "The Pen". The first execution was carried out in 1906, and the final in 2010 of Cal Coburn Brown. Capital punishment in Washington became illegal in 2018. The most notable inmate at Walla Walla is Gary Ridgway, a serial killer known as the "Green River killer," who pleaded guilty in 2003 to the murders of 48 women to avoid the death penalty. He was still incarcerated there as of December 2023.

Over a one-year period, starting in March 2002, more than one hundred inmates and staff at the Washington State Penitentiary were infected with Campylobacter jejuni. During this period, five clusters of the infection were identified, and genetic testing indicated that all of the bacteria were indistinguishable from each other. The exact source of this outbreak is not known. A combination of potential causes, including pigeon feces contaminating a leaky pipe in the kitchen and unsafe food handling practices, are cited as the official cause.

In 2005, the Washington State Legislature passed Substitute House Bill 1426, establishing the Children and Families of Incarcerated Parents Advisory Committee. This committee creates annual reports on conditions for inmates at the penitentiary to maintain connections with their families.

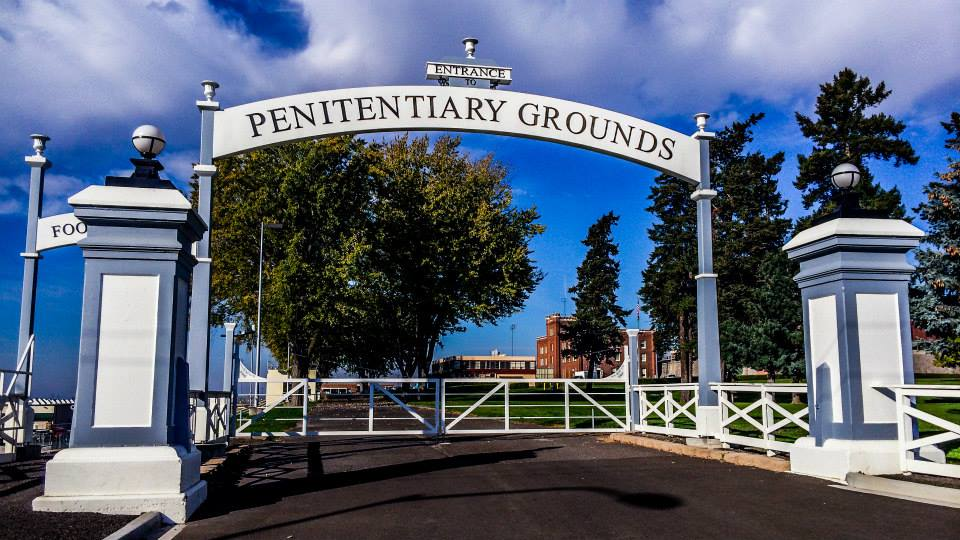
Entrance to Washington State Penitentiary grounds

In June 2021, dozens of inmates were subjected to extreme heat when the air conditioning stopped working in the solitary confinement unit. Temperatures rose to over 116 °F (47 °C) in the area surrounding the prison.

As of August 2025, the Washington State Penitentiary is coordinating with ICE despite protests from activists and Democratic lawmakers. Despite the Keep Washington Working Act, which intends to restrict and regulate state agencies' collaboration with federal law entities like ICE, the penitentiary continues to report prisoner citizenship status to ICE for transfer of custody upon release.

== Notable prisoners ==
Inmate name	Register number	Status	Details
Gary Ridgway	866218	Serving 49 life sentences without the possibility of parole.	Serial killer known as the "Green River Killer" who was convicted in 2003 of 48 murders he did between 1982 and 1998. In 2011, he pleaded guilty to a 49th murder.
Jack Owen Spillman	938784	Serving a life sentence without parole	Serial killer who murdered three people in 1994–1995.
Joseph McEnroe	384102	Serving a life sentence.	A perpetrator of the 2007 Carnation murders in which McEnroe assisted his girlfriend, Michele Kristen Anderson, in killing six of her family members.
Robert Lee Yates	817529	Serving two life sentences and an additional 408 years.	Serial killer who was convicted in 2000 of murdering 13 people. In 2002, he was sentenced to death for 2 additional murders.
Naveed Afzal Haq	337762	Serving a life sentence without parole.	Perpetrator of the 2006 Seattle Jewish Federation shooting in which he murdered Pamela Waechter and injured five others. The first legal proceedings ended with a mistrial, before he was sentenced for his crimes.
Billy Gohl	Unavailable	Served a life sentence, died 1927	Union employee who murdered many sailors, Aberdeen
Christopher Monfort	Unavailable	Died at Walla Walla in January 2017.	Convicted in the October 31, 2009, murder of police officer Timothy Brenton.
Gerald Friend	Unavailable	Originally at Walla Walla, now serving two consecutive 75-year terms in Spokane.	Convicted serial rapist and kidnapper, whose crimes after his release served as the inspiration for Nirvana song "Polly".
Henri Young	Unavailable	Life sentence for 1933 murder conviction.	Convicted bank robber and cause célèbre
Joseph Kondro	Unavailable	Died at Walla Walla in May 2012.	Convicted serial killer in the Longview murders of three girls,

- Kenneth Bianchi, serial killer, one of the two Hillside Stranglers
- Kevin Coe, convicted rapist from Spokane, often referred to in the news media as the "South Hill Rapist"
- Linda Hazzard, doctor known for murdering patients through her detox methods, Olalla, Washington
- Little Willie John, an R&B singer who was sentenced to 8–20 years for manslaughter and died at Walla Walla on May 26, 1968
- Lyle Beerbohm, American professional mixed martial artist who spent over a year in Walla Walla for drug-related crimes
- Mitchell Rupe was convicted in the September 1981 murders of two bank tellers during a robbery at Tumwater State Bank in Olympia. Rupe died at Walla Walla in February 2006.
- Stanley Bernson, convicted murderer and self-proclaimed serial killer
- Terapon "Lee" Adhahn, convicted of rape of several children and rape-murder of a child in Tacoma, Washington
- William Earl Talbott II

=== Executed ===
- Jake Bird, convicted double murderer and alleged serial killer, hanged on July 15, 1949
- Harvey Collins, serial killer, hanged on December 3, 1957
- Westley Allan Dodd, serial killer, hanged on January 5, 1993, upon his own request
- Charles Rodman Campbell, convicted of a triple murder, hanged on May 27, 1994
- Jeremy Vargas Sagastegui, convicted of a triple murder, executed by lethal injection on October 13, 1998
- James Homer Elledge, convicted of murder, executed by lethal injection on August 28, 2001
- Cal Coburn Brown, the last man executed in Washington State, executed by lethal injection on September 10, 2010

== Organization ==
The penitentiary has four custody levels:

- Camp/Minimum
- Medium
- Close
- Maximum/Segregation

== In popular culture ==
- "Walla Walla" is the eighth song on The Offspring's 1998 album, Americana. The song is an ode to a friend who, after countless times getting off with a "slap on the wrist", has been sentenced to serve "three to five" years. “Walla Walla” is used as slang for prison in general, as the lyrics state the subject of the song is actually incarcerated at Folsom Prison.
- The prison was used for the filming of a scene in the Danish movie Dancer in the Dark.

== See also ==
- List of law enforcement agencies in Washington (state)
- List of United States state correction agencies
- List of U.S. state prisons
- List of Washington state prisons
