= List of people executed in Washington =

The following is a list of people executed by the U.S. state of Washington since capital punishment was resumed in the United States in 1976.

Only five people, all male, were executed in Washington since 1976, three by lethal injection and two by hanging. 2010 was the last year an execution took place in the state before capital punishment was declared unconstitutional in 2018 and formally abolished in 2023.

== List of people executed in Washington since 1976 ==
No.	Name	Race	Age	Sex	Date of execution	County	Method	Victim(s)	Governor	Ref.
1	Westley Allan Dodd	White	31	Male	January 5, 1993	Clark	Hanging	3 victims (Note: Cole Neer, William Neer, and Lee Iseli)	Booth Gardner	Ref.
2	Charles Rodman Campbell	White	39	Male	May 27, 1994	Snohomish	Hanging	4 murder victims (Note: The 4 victims were: Barbara Hendrickson, Ranae Wicklund, Shannah Wicklund, and Hallie Ann Seaman. Campbell was executed for killing Hendrickson and the Wicklunds.)	Mike Lowry	
3	Jeremy Vargas Sagastegui	White	27	Male	October 13, 1998	Benton	Lethal injection	3 victims (Note: Melissa Sarbacher, Keivan Sarbacher, and Lisa Vera-Acevedo)	Gary Locke	
4	James Homer Elledge	White	58	Male	August 28, 2001	Snohomish	Lethal injection	Eloise Jane Fitzner (Note: Also killed Bertha Lush, but was executed for killing Fitzner.)	Gary Locke	
5	Cal Coburn Brown	White	52	Male	September 10, 2010	King	Lethal injection	Holly Washa	Christine Gregoire	

== Demographics ==
Race
White	5	100%
Age
20–29	1	20%
30–39	2	40%
50–59	2	40%
Sex
Male	5	100%
Female	0	0%
Date of execution
1990–1999	3	60%
2000–2009	1	20%
2010–2019	1	20%
Method
Lethal injection	3	60%
Hanging	2	40%
Governor (Party)
Booth Gardner (D)	1	20%
Mike Lowry (D)	1	20%
Gary Locke (D)	2	40%
Christine Gregoire (D)	1	20%
Total	5	100%

== See also ==
- Capital punishment in the United States
- Capital punishment in Washington (state)
- Lists of people executed in the United States
- List of people executed in Washington (pre-1972)
