= Charles Rodman Campbell =

American rapist and murderer (1954–1994)

- Born: October 21, 1954; Oahu, Territory of Hawaii, U.S.
- Died: May 27, 1994 (aged 39); Washington State Penitentiary, Washington, U.S.
- Status: Executed by hanging
- Convictions: Aggravated first degree murder (3 counts); First degree assault Sodomy; Second degree burglary
- Penalty: Death (December 17, 1982)

Details
- Victims: 4+
- Span of crimes: 1975 – April 14, 1982
- Country: United States
- State: Washington
- Date apprehended: April 1982

Charles Rodman Campbell (October 21, 1954 – May 27, 1994) was an American murderer and rapist. He was executed by hanging in 1994 by the state of Washington for a 1982 triple murder that he committed in Clearview, killing three female victims.

In 1974, Campbell attacked and sexually assaulted 23-year-old Renae Wicklund, leading to his apprehension in 1976. After Wicklund and her neighbor, Barbara Hendrickson, testified against him, Campbell was convicted of first degree assault and sodomy and received a sentence of 40 years in prison. Authorities did not make Wicklund aware of the fact that Campbell's sentence would allow him to be placed in a work release program after serving seven years behind bars despite Campbell being accused of multiple disciplinary infractions while serving his 40-year sentence, including the rape of at least two other inmates and the physical assault of a third; in 1981, he was placed in a work release facility under conditions that allowed him more freedom of movement outside of prison, unbeknownst to Wicklund.

On April 14, 1982, months after Campbell's placement in his work release program, he revisited and burglarized the Wicklund house, where then 31-year-old Renae Wicklund, her nine-year-old daughter Shannah, and 51-year-old Hendrickson were present, and murdered and mutilated all three of them. Campbell's motive for returning to Wicklund's home to further victimize her was revenge due to her and Hendrickson having testified against him during his trial for Wicklund's rape. Following his arrest, trial, and conviction, Campbell was executed by hanging, becoming one of only three people executed by hanging in the United States since 1976.

In 2023, DNA tests posthumously linked Campbell to a separate sexual assault and murder of a woman in 1975.

== Early life and background ==
Campbell was born on October 21, 1954, in Oahu, Hawaii. Campbell's father was a former Marine, and both his parents were heavy drinkers. He stated that he watched his father commit domestic violence against his mother frequently. Despite his father's domestic violence, Campbell stated in a 1982 psychological report that he admired his father and thought of his mother as weak and excessively disciplinary. Campbell began drinking and using drugs, including amphetamines and heroin, by the time he was 13 years old.

On October 29, 1970, eight days after his 16th birthday, Campbell's father reported him to the police in Edmonds, Washington, for stealing the family car. In July 1971, Campbell's mother reported him as a runaway but stated that she "[had] given up hope for [Campbell] except for trying to get him to court. She would not bother reporting him gone and would just as soon that he never came back home." The next day, he burglarized his grandparents' home and was promptly arrested after stealing several guns to finance a trip to California.

The theft of his grandparents' guns led to his incarceration at the Green Hill School in Chehalis, Washington approximately between 1971 and 1972. School employees considered him unruly at times but "nondescript," as several of the facility's employees had little recollection of Campbell when interviewed about him shortly before his execution. One of his prior instructors stated that he was the kind of student who "just falls between the cracks". Bob Williams, the superintendent of Green Hill School, recalled Campbell was "a real cold-blooded person" who "promised that he would try to hurt anybody that came around him". Campbell's stint in the youth detention facility was apparently intended to address antisocial tendencies.

In August 1973, after his stint at the Green Hill School ended, Campbell married. He subjected his wife to domestic violence and threatened to kill several members of her family as well as her dog. In March 1974, Campbell and his wife had a daughter; on one occasion in June 1974, when their daughter was three months old, Campbell grew irate at the infant's crying and threw a butcher knife at their daughter. In August 1974, Campbell and his wife divorced, and his wife gained custody of their daughter.

When Campbell was 23 years old, the Washington State Division of Juvenile Rehabilitation purged his juvenile crime records.

== Initial crimes against Renae Wicklund ==
On December 11, 1974, Campbell attacked then-23-year-old Renae Wicklund while she was doing yard work outside her home in Clearview, Washington. He demanded that she perform oral sex on him at knifepoint, threatening to kill her infant daughter, Shannah, if she did not comply. Wicklund submitted to his demands. After he completed the rape and left, Wicklund called police. Campbell was not apprehended until 1976, when she picked him out of a police line-up.

Campbell faced trial in spring 1976, and he pleaded not guilty. During Campbell's trial, Wicklund and her neighbor, Barbara Hendrickson, testified in detail about the assault; Hendrickson attested to Wicklund's psychological state following the assault. A jury convicted Campbell of first degree assault and sodomy in April. On May 11, 1976, Campbell began serving three concurrent sentences, totaling 40 years, for the assault and sodomy of Wicklund as well as an unrelated 1976 burglary. Wicklund was not alerted to the fact that Campbell's sentences ran concurrently, not consecutively, meaning that he could theoretically have been paroled in significantly fewer than 40 years.

During the intervening years, Wicklund had separated from her husband, Jack, due to the lingering stress of the assault and devoted herself to raising her daughter, supporting herself and Shannah with an in-home business as an accountant for local beauty parlors, as well as helping students obtain loans for beautician school. Jack Wicklund, meanwhile, fell victim to a bizarre incident in December 1977, when he was found tied to a chair in his West Seattle home with massive third-degree burns. After receiving medical treatment, he said that a complete stranger visited his house, tied him up, doused him with gasoline, and set him on fire. Wicklund was required to wear a rubber bodysuit to protect his damaged skin. Five months later, he died when his car crashed into a tree. The exact circumstances surrounding Jack Wicklund's death are unclear, and police never satisfactorily determined whether he had been murdered or had died by suicide.

=== Imprisonment and work release ===
During his stint serving his concurrent sentences in the Washington State Reformatory, Campbell accumulated several disciplinary infractions, including possessing homemade liquor he had illicitly brewed using yeast stolen from the prison kitchen; raping at least two fellow inmates and threatening murder if one of the victims reported the rape; and physically assaulting other inmates, including one incident in which the victim needed treatment for head injuries.

Campbell also began having sex with a prison substance abuse counselor and former nun, who was later fired for this illicit relationship. In October 1982, the counselor gave birth to a son fathered by Campbell.

In January 1979, a prison psychologist completed a psychological review of Campbell, concluding that Campbell was drawn to conflict, exhibited multiple antisocial tendencies, had no regard for others, and "[had] declared war on society, all of whom he regards as mindless nitwits who are getting theirs and are now out to get him." The psychological review also stated Campbell was "[blithely] uncaring of others, conscienceless, malevolently intolerable of the social order which imprisons him, and [was] imminently harmful to all who directly or indirectly capture his attention or interest".

Despite his prison disciplinary infractions and his psychological report, the Washington State Parole Board waived Campbell's mandatory sentence in June 1981, thus making him eligible to be downgraded to minimum-security custodial status as he awaited a May 1983 parole hearing date. In October 1981, Campbell was placed in a work release facility in Monroe, Washington. Sometime between December 25, 1981, and January 4, 1982, Campbell's ex-wife accused him of temporarily leaving his work release to rape her. Following the closure of his original work release program in Monroe, Campbell was transferred to another program in Everett, Washington, on February 24, 1982, where he committed four additional disciplinary infractions in his first 30 days.

== Triple murders ==
On April 14, 1982, then-31-year-old Renae Wicklund was sick at her home in Clearview, and her nine-year-old daughter Shannah was with her. Her neighbor, then-51-year-old Barbara Hendrickson, visited the home at approximately 4:20 pm to tend to Wicklund and check her vital signs. Two hours later, at 6:30 pm, Hendrickson's husband Donald visited Wicklund's home to check on his wife and discovered the dead bodies of all three victims in different rooms of the house. Campbell beat and assaulted all three victims before murdering them. He tore Renae's and Hendrickson's earlobes to steal their earrings. He severely beat Renae across the head, back, and upper chest, broke her jaw and nose, strangled her, raped her with a blunt object, and cut her throat, severing her carotid arteries; her official cause of death was exsanguination from the cut to her throat. Campbell also strangled Shannah and cut her neck so deeply, that he nearly decapitated her; her blood loss was extensive enough to make it difficult for investigators to obtain a sample of her blood, since she lost 95% of her blood, and extensive enough only takes 5% loss of blood. The blood loss caused extreme trauma, instant lung collapse, and she is estimated to have died just 100 ms after. Campbell cut Hendrickson's throat as well. The same day of the murders, Campbell also tried to rape another woman.

A neighbor of Wicklund's told police she saw Campbell sneaking around Wicklund's yard with a knife that morning, and other neighbors observed him heading towards the house with a large blanket roll in his hands. After investigating the crime scene, investigators found a drinking glass with a bloody handprint on it which matched Campbell's fingerprints; Campbell also left a trail of Renae Wicklund's jewelry running from the front door of the house down the walkway. Campbell's car had dried blood on the driver's side door handle, and Shannah's earring was found in the back seat. Investigators found a pair of Renae's earrings in Campbell's pants pockets during his arrest. In addition, a fellow work release resident directed police to a location along the banks of the Snohomish River, where he and Campbell had been on the evening of April 14. There, diving units recovered several pieces of clothing, decoration, and jewelry, including pottery, other pairs of earrings, a bracelet, necklaces, a pair of jeans, and a shirt from the river. When questioned by police, Donald Hendrickson stated that "the man who'd attacked Renae eight years earlier" was the only possible perpetrator he could think of.

Campbell was arrested at the Monroe Reformatory on April 19, and charged with first degree murder. Held in the Snohomish County Jail, he was unpopular with other prisoners because he had murdered a child; additionally, the circumstances of his crime meant that stricter rules would be imposed on the freedoms of inmates on parole.

== Trial ==
At Campbell's November 1982 trial, he refused to testify in his defense or discuss the murders at all. Testifying for the prosecution were neighbors who had seen him sneaking around the house on the afternoon of April 14, and the substance abuse counselor, who was his girlfriend by that time, who said that on the morning of the killings, he'd been at her home, where he consumed an entire six pack of beer. The next day, she noticed one of her kitchen knives was missing. His girlfriend testified that Campbell had "considerable resentment" towards Renae Wicklund and had driven past her home a couple of times while on work release. Campbell took the unusual step of cross-examining his girlfriend himself, and got her to admit that he had never told her he wanted to harm Renae Wicklund.

The defense did not call any witnesses or present any evidence other than that the case was a miscarriage of justice because investigators immediately focused on Campbell and did not search for any other potential suspects. Numerous citizens of Clearview had signed a petition demanding the death penalty for him, and the jury agreed, arguing that he showed no signs whatsoever of remorse for killing the Wicklunds and Barbara Hendrickson. During the trial, Campbell remained for the most part detached, and said little. Even the crime scene and autopsy photos (see below) did not arouse much noticeable emotion in him. Renae Wicklund's mother and sister, who lived in North Dakota, were particularly shocked by the murders because she had never told them about being raped eight years earlier.

During the trial, Campbell's attorneys argued that he could not be charged with rape, since the wound in Renae Wicklund's vagina was a post-mortem injury that had not bled. Snohomish County Coroner Dr. Clayton Haberman, who performed the autopsies, pointed out that brain death does not occur until a few minutes after circulation ceases, and she could technically have still been alive when the assault happened, but it may just as easily have been hours later. He also noted that Shannah lost so much blood that it was difficult to collect a sample from her. Judge Dennis Britt thus ordered the jury to disregard the rape allegations. The defense also protested the prosecution's decision to display graphic autopsy photos of the Wicklunds and Barbara Hendrickson. Judge Britt allowed this, but said that the jurors could decide for themselves whether they wanted to see their blood-splattered clothing.

Because the only living witness to the murders would not speak of or recount what happened, investigators had to roughly piece together the sequence of events on April 14. Renae Wicklund had obviously been attacked first. Shannah was found lying in the bedroom next to her, and it was believed that Campbell may have shown the girl her mother's lifeless body prior to slitting her throat. They were probably both dead by the time Barbara Hendrickson entered the home. Knocked-over furniture in the living room indicated that she could have run into Campbell and attempted to flee, but was caught. The bodies were all positioned in such a way that "the effect seems to have been to intentionally shock whoever came across them".

On November 26, 1982, Campbell was convicted of the three murders of Renae Wicklund, Shannah Wicklund, and Barbara Hendrickson. On December 17, 1982, he was condemned to death.

== Incarceration and appeals ==
=== Incarceration ===
In 1985, a still more damning report emerged alleging that Monroe Reformatory staff had not only covered up for Campbell, but were actively conspiring with him. Inmate counselor Roger Button kept certain inmates on his "payroll", which included Charles Campbell. The inmates supplied Button with sexual favors in exchange for his covering up their prison infractions; and in addition, he used them as extortion agents to beat up prisoners he disliked, collect debts, or protect prisoners he did like. Button denied all of these allegations.

While his case was at various stages of appeal, he remained a much-feared figure in Walla Walla's death row for the next decade, even spitting at then-Governor Booth Gardner when he peered into his cell.

While Campbell was on death row, his mother stated that she still loved Campbell but supported his death sentence. Campbell's mother claimed that he had sex with a pet dog that he adopted, and after learning of his arrest for first-degree murder told investigators that, "It was inevitable. I never believed he was going to end up anywhere but the electric chair." His father and sisters could not be located. Campbell's mother died before his execution was carried out.

In a 1982 psychological report by Charles P. Tappin, a Seattle-based psychiatrist, Tappin confirmed that Campbell did not exhibit signs of brain damage but had an "unorthodox" antisocial view of reality. Campbell was quoted in the report as saying, "The world has created me, and I am free to do what I want. There is no right or wrong, or anyone to tell me what to do."

Campbell rejected most offers for interviews during his stay on death row, choosing instead to dedicate most of his time on death row to his appeals.

=== Appeals ===
On November 6, 1984, the Washington Supreme Court upheld Campbell's conviction and death sentence, and on January 21, 1985, Campbell's first death warrant was signed, scheduling his execution to take place on March 29, 1985. Two weeks before that execution date, Campbell received a stay of execution because he had not yet completed his appeals. On April 29, 1985, the Supreme Court of the United States rejected one of Campbell's petitions for appeal, and on May 17, a second death warrant was signed, scheduling his execution for July 25, 1985. One week prior, the Washington Supreme Court denied Campbell's request for a stay and appeal, but on July 22, a federal district court granted an indefinite stay of execution.

On October 6, 1987, the United States Court of Appeals for the Ninth Circuit denied another of Campbell's appeal petitions, but they did not lift his stay of execution until January 25, 1989. In the meantime, on November 7, 1988, the U.S. Supreme Court refused to hear Campbell's case. On February 15, 1989, Campbell had a third death warrant signed, scheduling his execution for March 30, 1989. Only 33 hours before that date of execution, Campbell received a stay of execution from the Ninth Circuit Court, with them citing that Campbell had several remaining appeals. On September 13, 1991, Campbell filed a third federal appeal, which was dismissed by a U.S. District Court on March 9, 1992.

On April 28, 1993, Campbell filed an appeal with the Ninth Circuit Court arguing that hanging violated the Eighth Amendment to the United States Constitution because it was cruel and unusual punishment; in this appeal, Campbell also argued it was unconstitutionally cruel to make inmates choose a method of execution or to encourage inmates to choose a method of execution, arguing that Washington encouraged inmates to make a choice by making hanging their default method. On February 8, 1994, the Ninth Circuit Court denied Campbell's appeal with a 6–5 ruling upholding the constitutionality of hanging as a method of execution; the ruling also determined that Washington was not in violation of the U.S. Constitution by having inmates choose their method of execution.

The 1989 stay of execution remained active until April 14, 1994, when the Ninth Circuit Court lifted the stay; the next day, April 15, Campbell's fourth and final death warrant was signed, scheduling Campbell's execution to take place on May 27, 1994.

== Execution ==
=== Last-minute clemency requests and hanging preparation ===
Washington State offered its death row inmates the choice between execution by lethal injection or hanging, but at the time, hanging was the state's default method of execution; inmates who refused to choose a method of execution would be hanged. Campbell refused to choose between the two, meaning his method of execution would, by default, be hanging.

Sometime before his execution, Campbell wrote a letter to Washington Governor Mike Lowry to request a face-to-face meeting, calling himself a "victim" as well as a defendant and asking Lowry to observe "[Campbell's] sincerity, candor, and demeanor," but Lowry declined to meet with Campbell.

On May 24, 1994, three days prior to Campbell's execution, the state clemency board unanimously refused Campbell's plea for mercy in a 4–0 vote, with one member abstaining. Despite rejecting Campbell's offer for a meeting earlier, on the night of May 24, Lowry made the unprecedented decision to hold a private meeting with Campbell in a section of Washington State's death row. His meeting with Campbell lasted approximately 30 minutes. Lowry's press secretary characterized the meeting as "Mr. Campbell's opportunity" to advocate for the commutation of his sentence to life without parole. Lowry also met with relatives of Campbell's victims, as well as a separate group of death penalty opponents, prior to making his final decision regarding Campbell's fate. Lowry's office reported receiving an overwhelming amount of letters from members of the public who were in support of Campbell's execution, 3,789 letters, compared to 532 letters in opposition. Lowry was personally opposed to capital punishment and had the power under Washington State law to grant clemency and pardons without requiring a recommendation from the state's clemency board, but one of his spokespeople stated that Lowry would deal with pending executions on a case-by-case basis. After completing the meetings and reviewing the evidence in Campbell's case, Lowry issued a short statement confirming he would not interfere in Campbell's case, allowing the execution to proceed.

Shortly before Campbell's execution, officials recorded Campbell's weight at 220 pounds (100 kg). Officials determined that a rope permitting a 5-foot (1.5 m) drop would be sufficient to successfully break Campbell's neck during his hanging. Campbell's drop of 5 feet (1.5 m) was the minimum allowed in the U.S. Army manual that Washington officials consulted when crafting their hanging protocol. Twenty-four hours before the execution, Campbell was given his last shower. The day prior to his execution, Campbell was non-compliant when officers went to transport him to a holding cell near the execution chamber. Officers found him faint, lying on the floor of his cell, and ultimately subdued him using pepper spray. Later, while cleaning out Campbell's former cell, authorities found a four-inch piece of metal that he had been sharpening into a knife.

Officials served Campbell his last meal, a fish dinner, two hours before the hanging took place, and he refused to eat most of it. Campbell spent his final hours visiting and talking to friends and relatives, including an attorney, his son, and his girlfriend, the ex-prison counselor with whom he had his son.

=== Execution ===
Witnesses to Campbell's execution included twelve reporters affiliated with various media outlets, three relatives of the victims' families, the Snohomish County Prosecutor, and Campbell's attorney. Authorities had to forcibly strap Campbell to a board in order to execute him, stating that he had trouble walking and standing on his own. Guards carried Campbell to the gallows strapped rigidly to the board. Campbell then repeatedly moved his head, giving prison officials difficulty in placing a hood over his head before the trap door was opened. Officials sprung the trap door at 12:08 am, and he was pronounced dead six minutes later, at 12:14 am. Witnesses described the execution as "fast and clinical" and said that following his drop from the trap door, Campbell did not move at all. Campbell's was the second hanging in both Washington and the United States as a whole in two years, after serial child killer and execution volunteer Westley Allan Dodd, and Campbell's execution was also the first involuntary execution in Washington in over 30 years, after the hanging of convicted murderer Joseph Chester Self in 1963.

Following Campbell's hanging, the King County Medical Examiner's Office conducted an autopsy on his remains. Medical Examiner Donald Reay determined Campbell experienced a broken neck and broken spinal cord following his drop from the gallows' trap door, and Reay also found that Campbell died seconds after the drop. After his execution, no one stepped forward to claim his remains, so Walla Walla County officials cremated his body, although his girlfriend and son later claimed his remains, as well as Campbell's remaining personal effects, on May 31, as Campbell had requested before his execution.

== Aftermath ==
The triple murders sparked legislative changes in Washington State, namely the passage of laws strengthening and broadening the state's death penalty, allowing for its application in a wider set of circumstances.

In the aftermath of the trial, there were numerous lawsuits. His ex-wife sued the State of Washington for negligence in allowing him to go free on work release and rape her two times. Hilda Ahlers filed a lawsuit seeking damages for the same negligence that led to the death of her daughter and granddaughter. The state also agreed to pay Don Hendrickson $950,000 in damages.

In 1996, Washington legislators made lethal injection the state's default method of execution. In 2018, the Washington Supreme Court declared the state's death penalty was unconstitutional, effectively abolishing capital punishment in the state.

In 2023, DNA evidence showed that Campbell was likely responsible for the murder of 25-year-old University of Washington student Hallie Ann Seaman, whose murder has previously been unsolved. On April 29, 1975, Seaman had been sexually assaulted and stabbed to death, and her murderer, likely Campbell, moved her car 4 miles (6.4 km) from the location where a passerby would discover her body the next day. Seaman's car was also set on fire.

== See also ==
- Capital punishment in Washington (state)
- Capital punishment in the United States
- Hanging in the United States
- List of people executed in Washington
- List of people executed in the United States in 1994
- List of rampage killers

== General references ==
- Washington Hangs Murderer; Texas Executes Officer-Killer May 28, 1994
- Federal Court Upholds Execution by Hanging February 9, 1994
- Inmate Faces 1st Hanging in U.S. Since 1965 March 27, 1989
- The State of Washington, Respondent, v. Charles R. Campbell, Appellant.

Executions carried out in Washington
Preceded by Westley Allan Dodd January 5, 1993	Charles Rodman Campbell; May 27, 1994	Succeeded by Jeremy Vargas Sagastegui October 13, 1998
Executions carried out in the United States
Preceded by Stephen Ray Nethery – Texas May 27, 1994	Charles Rodman Campbell – Washington; May 27, 1994	Succeeded by Denton Alan Crank – Texas June 14, 1994
