= Jeremy Vargas Sagastegui =

American murderer (1970–1998)

- Born: November 1, 1970; Pasco, Washington, U.S.
- Died: October 13, 1998 (aged 27); Washington State Penitentiary, Walla Walla, Washington, U.S.
- Cause of death: Execution by lethal injection
- Status: Executed
- Conviction: Aggravated first degree murder (3 counts)
- Penalty: Death

Jeremy Vargas Sagastegui (November 1, 1970 – October 13, 1998) was an American killer convicted of three counts of aggravated first-degree murder for the drowning and beating of Keivan Sarbacher, 3, and the shooting deaths of his mother, Mellisa Sarbacher, 21, and a second woman, Lisa Vera-Acevedo, 27.

== Background ==
Sagastegui was born on November 1, 1970 in Pasco, Washington to father Baltazar Sagastegui and mother Cayentana "Katie" Vargas. He had 3 brothers and sisters. He was of Mexican decent. According to his family, he was a victim of sexual abuse as a child by neighbors and relatives. His childhood was reportedly turbulent, with family reporting drug use as early as 13 years old. In his 20's, he suffered from suicidal thoughts. He also struggled with alcoholism, suffering from frequently blackouts. He was institutionalized for one week at a psychiatric hospital and was diagnosed with schizophrenia and manic depressive disorder 3 months before the murders.

Prior to his arrest, he worked as a lawn maintenance worker. At the time of the murders, he was unemployed and had no permanent home. Sagastegui had babysat for Sarbacher for no cost several times before the murders.

== Murders ==
The killings occurred on November 19, 1995, in a mobile home in rural Finley, Washington, located east of Kennewick, where Sagastegui had been babysitting Sarbacher's two children. The second child, a 1-year-old girl, was unharmed.

Sometime between the evening hours of November 18 and the early morning hours of November 19, at a residence in Finley, Jeremy Sagastegui sexually abused, beat, stabbed, and then drowned Kievan Sarbacher, a three-year-old boy who was in his care. Sagastegui claimed to have murdered Kievan because he wouldn't stop crying for his mother. Sagastegui then waited for Kievan's mother, Melissa Sarbacher, to return home. When she did so, he shot her and her friend, Lisa Vera-Acevedo, who had accompanied Sarbacher home.

Vera-Acevedo's body was discovered outside of the mobile home by a neighbor at around 9:30am. The other two bodies were found inside of the home. Kievan's cause of death was determined to be drowning.

Sagastegui was arrested without incident on November 20, 1995 in Kennewick. The arrest was a joint effort between Kennewick, Richland, and Benton County Sheriff deputies. A rifle that was used in the crime was seized from the apartment he was visiting during his arrest.

== Trial and Execution ==
His trial took place in the Benton County Superior Court, with judge Carolyn A. Brown overseeing the proceedings. The state was represented by prosecutor Andy Miller. During the trial, Sagastegui represented himself, citing mistrust in the judicial system. His standby defense council was Jim Egan. In late December, a sharpened toothbrush was found in his cell, causing jail staff concerned that he was suicidal. On December 29, the trial was halted for Sagastegui to undergo a 15 day psychiatric evaluation at Eastern State Hospital in Spokane. This occurred after Sagastegui tried to plead guilty to the crime in court and asked the judge to impose the death penalty on him. He was found competent to stand trial 3 weeks later and was sent back to Benton County to stand trial

In prison, Sagasteugi had access to crime scene photos in preparation for the trials. He allegedly showed the images to other inmates at the jail. As a result, the court ordered that Sagasteugi was only able to review crime scene photos in presence of defense attorney Jim Egan.

The convicted triple murderer refused to fight his execution. His mother filed for a stay on his behalf but it was denied as Sagastegui was found competent, and therefore no third party, including his mother, could file on his behalf.

He was executed on October 13, 1998, by lethal injection aged 27. He had no last words, and was pronounced dead at 12:43am. Fifteen people witnessed the execution, including family members of the victims, reporters, judge Carolyn Brown and a prosecutor from Benton County. He was cremated.

== See also ==
- Capital punishment in Washington (state)
- Capital punishment in the United States
- List of people executed in Washington
- List of people executed in the United States in 1998

== General references ==
- 135 Wn.2d 67, STATE v. SAGASTEGUI No. 63744-0. En Banc.. Retrieved on 2007-11-10.
- Persons Executed Since 1904 in Washington State. Washington State Department of Corrections. Retrieved on 2019-01-12.
- State Supreme Court Denies Motion to Delay Sagastegui Execution. Washington State Office of the Attorney General (1998-10-01). Retrieved on 2007-11-10.
- Jason Hagey.. Tri-City Herald (1998-08-18). Archived from the original on 1999-04-18. Retrieved on 2007-11-10.

Preceded by Charles Rodman Campbell	Executions carried out in Washington State	Succeeded by James Homer Elledge
