= Mitchell Rupe =

American convicted murderer

Mitchell Edward Rupe (August 7, 1954 – February 7, 2006) was a convicted murderer who achieved notoriety when a federal judge determined that Rupe was too obese to hang.

On the morning of September 17, 1981, Rupe fatally shot bank tellers Candace Hemmig and Twila Capron during a robbery of Tumwater State Bank in Olympia, Washington. Capron's husband arrived at the bank shortly after the robbery and called 9-1-1. While police were investigating the scene they were approached by Rupe, who told them that he had been at the bank that morning. Rupe was questioned by police several times and confessed to committing the crimes, giving three statements to police officers. Additionally, Rupe's bloodstained checkbook was found at the crime scene, and the type of ammunition used in the crime was found in Rupe's car.

At his trial, Rupe denied any involvement in the crime and blamed a friend of his. A psychologist testified that he had given Rupe a diagnosis of schizotypal personality disorder and a secondary diagnosis of histrionic personality disorder, and that these disorders caused Rupe to make a false confession. Mitchell Rupe was found guilty of aggravated murder and sentenced to death.

His death sentence was overturned twice, the second time being in 1994 when United States federal judge Thomas S. Zilly ruled that Rupe was too heavy to hang. Rupe was over 425 pounds at the time (as high as the scale went) and the judge was concerned that execution by hanging could cause Rupe to be decapitated, which would constitute cruel and unusual punishment.

Rupe was re-sentenced a third time in 2000 by a new jury. After a two-week sentencing hearing, Rupe escaped a new death sentence when the jury deadlocked by an 11–1 vote in favor of the death penalty, falling short of the unanimous verdict required by Washington law for imposition of a death sentence.

Rupe died of liver disease in the Washington State Penitentiary in Walla Walla, Washington on February 7, 2006.
