= Capital punishment in Washington (state) =

The U.S. state of Washington enforced capital punishment until the state's capital punishment statute was declared null and void and abolished in practice by a state Supreme Court ruling on October 11, 2018. The court ruled that it was unconstitutional as applied due to racial bias; however, it did not render the wider institution of capital punishment unconstitutional and rather required the statute to be amended to eliminate racial biases. From 1904 to 2010, 78 people were executed by the state; the last was Cal Coburn Brown on September 10, 2010. In April 2023, Governor Jay Inslee signed SB5087 which formally abolished capital punishment in Washington State and removed provisions for capital punishment from state law.

== Legal process ==
When the prosecution sought the death penalty, the sentence was decided by the jury and had to be unanimous.

In case of a hung jury during the penalty phase of the trial, a life sentence would be issued, even if a single juror opposed death (there was no retrial).

The governor had the power of clemency with respect to death sentences.

== Capital crimes ==
The following were considered circumstances for aggravated first degree murder:

1. The victim was a law enforcement officer, corrections officer, or firefighter who was performing his or her official duties at the time of the act resulting in death and the victim was known or reasonably should have been known by the person to be such at the time of the killing.
2. At the time of the act resulting in the death, the person was serving a term of imprisonment, had escaped, or was on authorized or unauthorized leave in or from a state facility or program for the incarceration or treatment of persons adjudicated guilty of crimes.
3. At the time of the act resulting in death, the person was in custody in a county or county-city jail as a consequence of having been adjudicated guilty of a felony;
4. The person committed the murder pursuant to an agreement that he or she would receive money or any other thing of value for committing the murder.
5. The person solicited another person to commit the murder and had paid or had agreed to pay money or any other thing of value for committing the murder.
6. The person committed the murder to obtain or maintain his or her membership or to advance his or her position in the hierarchy of an organization, association, or identifiable group.
7. The murder was committed during the course of or as a result of a shooting where the discharge of the firearm, is either from a motor vehicle or from the immediate area of a motor vehicle that was used to transport the shooter or the firearm, or both, to the scene of the discharge.
8. The victim was a judge; juror or former juror; prospective, current, or former witness in an adjudicative proceeding; prosecuting attorney; deputy prosecuting attorney; defense attorney; a member of the indeterminate sentence review board; or a probation or parole officer; and the murder was related to the exercise of official duties performed or to be performed by the victim.
9. The person committed the murder to conceal the commission of a crime or to protect or conceal the identity of any person committing a crime including, but specifically not limited to, any attempt to avoid prosecution as a persistent offender.
10. There was more than one victim and the murders were part of a common scheme or plan or the result of a single act of the person.
11. The murder was committed in the course of, in furtherance of, or in immediate flight from robbery in the first or second degree, rape in the first or second degree, burglary in the first or second degree or residential burglary, kidnapping in the first degree, or arson in the first degree.
12. The victim was regularly employed or self-employed as a newsreporter and the murder was committed to obstruct or hinder the investigative, research, or reporting activities of the victim.
13. At the time the person committed the murder, there existed a court order, issued in this or any other state, which prohibited the person from either contacting the victim, molesting the victim, or disturbing the peace of the victim, and the person had knowledge of the existence of that order.
14. At the time the person committed the murder, the person and the victim were "family or household members" as that term is defined by law, and the person had previously engaged in a pattern or practice of three or more of the following crimes committed upon the victim within a five-year period, regardless of whether a conviction was a result of harassment or any criminal assault.

== Method ==
Death Row for males was located at Washington State Penitentiary at Walla Walla, which was also the site of executions. Females were housed at Washington Corrections Center for Women at Purdy near Gig Harbor while awaiting execution.

Following the reintroduction of capital punishment in the late 1970s, inmates were able to choose if their execution will be carried out by lethal injection or hanging. If the inmate made no decision, lethal injection was the default method. Washington was the last state with an active gallows (Delaware dismantled theirs in 2003).

According to the Revised Code of Washington § 10.95.180, executions in Washington:

...shall be inflicted by intravenous injection of a substance or substances in a lethal quantity sufficient to cause death and until the defendant is dead, or, at the election of the defendant, by hanging by the neck until the defendant is dead.

Mitchell Rupe attempted to have his execution overturned due to the fact that his obesity could decapitate him, thus leading to his execution being cruel and unusual. The court held that the science behind the method of hanging was insufficient to mitigate the likelihood of decapitation. Charles Rodman Campbell declined to choose his method of execution, thus the method defaulted to hanging (which was the default method at the time). His execution was carried out without incident.

On September 10, 2010, Washington became the second state, after Ohio, to use a single dose injection of sodium thiopental as opposed to the typical three drug protocol used in most other jurisdictions. The single-drug protocol was used during the execution of Cal Coburn Brown.

== Early history ==
A total of 110 executions have been carried out in the state and its predecessor territories since 1849. All but the most recent three were by hanging. As of 2017, the Washington State Department of Corrections listed eight men on death row. The first hangings occurred on January 5, 1849, when Cussas and Quallahworst, two Native Americans, were hanged for murder. Executions are rarely carried out in the state — the most executions in one year was five in 1939, and there was an average of less than one hanging per year between 1849 and 1963.

The death penalty was abolished in 1913 and reinstated in 1919. The statute remained unchanged until 1975, when the people adopted a measure providing a mandatory death sentence for aggravated murder, with 69% of voters in favor.

U.S. Supreme Court rulings in Woodson v. North Carolina, 428 U.S. 280 (1976) and Roberts v. Louisiana, 428 U.S. 325 (1976), 431 U.S. 633 (1977), meant that such a law was unconstitutional and the statute was modified to give detailed procedures for imposing the death penalty.

This new law was itself found unconstitutional by the Washington Supreme Court, as a person who had pleaded not guilty could be sentenced to death, while someone who pleaded guilty would receive a maximum sentence of life imprisonment without possibility of parole. The current law was passed in 1981 to correct these constitutional defects.

In 1995, Washington Supreme Court Justice Robert F. Utter resigned in protest of the court's handling of capital punishment, stating "I have reached the point where I can no longer participate in a legal system that intentionally takes human life in capital punishment cases”.

== Abolition ==
On February 11, 2014, Governor Jay Inslee announced a capital punishment moratorium. All death penalty cases that came to Inslee would result in him issuing a reprieve, but not a pardon or commutation.

On January 16, 2017, Governor Inslee and Attorney General Bob Ferguson introduced legislation to abolish the death penalty in Washington state. Though the legislation failed to pass, Governor Inslee stated a commitment to ending capital punishment in the future.

On October 11, 2018, the Washington Supreme Court found that the state's current death penalty statute violated the Constitution of Washington, on the ground that it resulted in racial bias, thus abolishing capital punishment in the state. All of the court's members agreed in the result. In State v. Gregory, represented by civil rights attorneys Lila Silverstein and Neil Fox, the court based its conclusions on a regression analysis by University of Washington sociologist Katherine Beckett which had been commissioned by a condemned prisoner.

The eight inmates that were on death row at the time of ruling had their sentences converted to life in prison. The State Supreme Court did not rule out the possibility that the state legislature could enact a constitutional death penalty statute in the future.

In April 2023, Governor Inslee signed SB 5087, which formally abolished capital punishment in Washington state and removed provisions for capital punishment from state law.

== Debate ==
In 2004, the Washington State Bar Association's Council on Public Defense chartered a sub-committee to examine "the practical wisdom of continuing to pursue death penalty prosecutions in light of Washington's experience with sentence reversals, potential benefits to the criminal justice system from cost savings" and other matters. Made up of both opponents and advocates, the subcommittee issued its final report in December 2006. Noting the extra costs associated with capital trials and great disparities in the current system, the report suggested that compensation for attorneys be increased, with all defense and prosecution costs to be paid by the state.

Support for the death penalty in the United States is at historic lows. In a 2017 end of the year report, the Death Penalty Information Center reported that public support of the death penalty reached 45 year lows. In Washington state, Jay Inslee's decision to institute a moratorium on capital punishment did not negatively impact his support among voters, as evidenced by the fact that he won the 2016 gubernatorial race (54.2%) by a larger margin than the 2012 race (51.5%). Inslee won by an even larger margin in 2020 (56.6%), running against a pro-capital punishment candidate for the first time.

== See also ==
- List of people executed in Washington
- Crime in Washington (state)
- Law of Washington (state)
- Chief Leschi
- Capital punishment in the United States
