= John Kinnear =

John Kinnear may refer to:

- John Kinnear (Irish politician) (1824–1894), Member of Parliament for Donegal 1880–1885
- John Boyd Kinnear (1828–1920), Scottish lawyer, writer and radical Liberal politician
- John R. Kinnear (1842–1912), American politician from the state of Washington
