= J. H. Jones =

J. H. Jones may refer to:

- J. H. Jones (Washington politician)
- J. H. Jones (Mississippi politician)
