= Clinton P. Ferry =

Founder and pioneer of Tacoma, Washington

Clinton Peyre Ferry
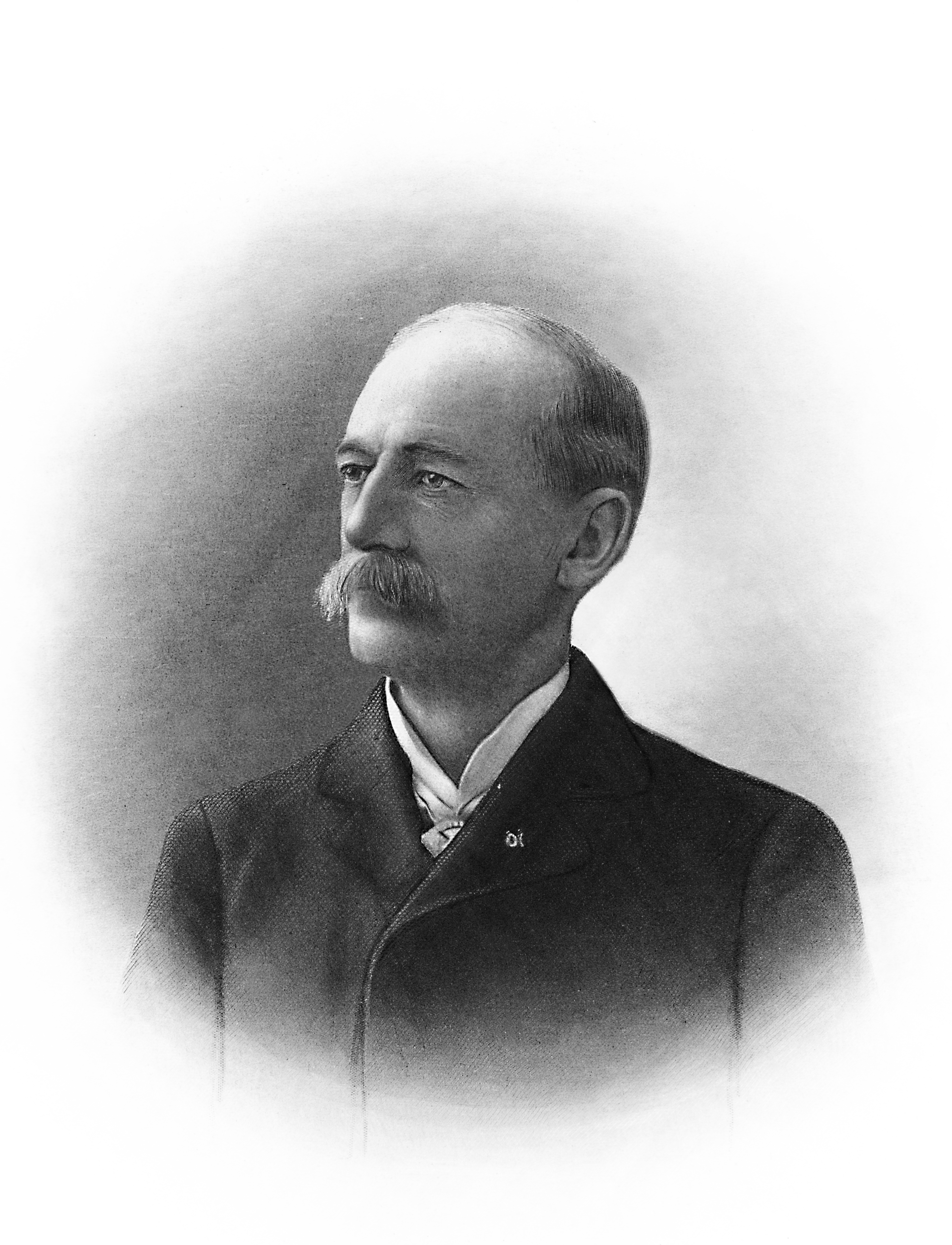
- Born: May 24, 1836; Fort Wayne, Indiana, US
- Died: 1909; San Diego, California, US
- Burial place: Tacoma Cemetery, Tacoma, Washington
- Occupations: Duke of Tacoma; treasurer of Portland; real estate businessman
- Years active: 1873–1909
- Known for: One of the founders of Tacoma; founded the Ferry Museum and collected a vast array of its showpieces
- Political party: Republican
- Spouses: Mary Ann Buckalew (married 1862 (or 1868) – 1874); Eveline Trafton
- Children: 2
- Relatives: Elisha P. Ferry (uncle)

Clinton Peyre Ferry (during his lifetime usually referred to as Colonel Clinton Peyre Ferry; May 24, 1836 – 1909) was a founder and pioneer of Tacoma, Washington, and a successful businessman and art connoisseur. He was also known as the Duke of Tacoma.

Ferry left his home in Indiana at the age of twenty-two to travel the U.S. in search of a place, that would grow into a city of note. He settled in Portland, Oregon for about seventeen years, was its treasurer for four years, and later worked in investments and as a general agent in a number of companies.

Ferry arrived in the Tacoma area in 1873, and is credited for giving the city its name. He improved the city's infrastructure by investing in real estate, creating parks, and working on the city's layout. He increased the city's national importance by making it the western terminus of the Northern Pacific Railroad. Later, due to the failing economy and the ensuing panic, the railroad closed. Ferry tried to keep his business going, but later gave up and left the city, coming back in 1893.

Ferry travelled extensively around Europe, collecting a vast array of art. On his return to Tacoma, Ferry donated his collection to the city, and later the first city museum was established under the name of the Ferry Museum. The museum gave people opportunities to learn art, history, and culture, and develop their artistic skills.

== Early life ==
Clinton Ferry was born in Fort Wayne, Indiana, on May 24, 1836. His parents were Lucien Peyre Ferry, son of a French immigrant and a Michigan pioneer, and Caroline Bourie, also a French descendant and once a president of the Fort Wayne Pioneer Society. Ferry's father died at the age of 32; his mother lived to be 100. (Note: There's an account that erroneously states Ferry's parents died when he was only 7 years old, though this statement is disproved by multiple other sources.)

Ferry received education both at home and in one of the first commercial schools established in the U.S., in Indianapolis. To pay for his education, he worked in a printing office. In addition, he learned Morse code, and from 1851 to 1852 was in charge of the Fort Wayne telegraph office. Later he worked as a clerk in a local store.

For some time, he lived with his uncle in Illinois while he tried studying law, but he didn't like it and returned to Fort Wayne. There he worked as a cashier in the office of the Toledo & Western Railroad.

== Career in Portland, Oregon ==
In 1858, Ferry headed to Washington State, exploring the U.S. for a place where a Puget Sound "metropolis" could be built. On his way, he visited Portland, Oregon, where he settled for about seventeen years.

In Portland, Ferry worked in a wholesale store as a bookkeeper, and later was employed by Hummiston & Company as a partner in the brokerage and banking business. After a while, he was chosen as treasurer of Portland, which by that time had started to grow into a big city. Ferry was in charge of the city's finances for four years. After leaving the position, he started investing in real estate, and simultaneously working for several life, fire, marine, and accident insurance companies as a general agent.

== Tacoma, Washington ==
In 1868, Ferry and his in-laws bought a piece of land on the east shore of Puget Sound, northeast of Olympia. The place they believed to have potential started to develop, and in 1873, the family came there to settle. Ferry, along with his father-in-law General Matthew Morton McCarver, was credited for giving it the name Tacoma.

In Tacoma, Ferry kept investing in real-estate, accumulating considerable property. A patriot of the city, he dedicated most of his time to social and administrative improvements. Aside from being invested in the city's development on the national level, Ferry was interested in its internal establishment, creating parks, sidewalks, and the whole city's layout. On May 14, 1883, he donated a half-acre plot of land that later became Ferry Park. In 1902 he ordered 5 statues including a sphinx, 2 griffins, and one titled the Lioness and Her Cubs.

Through the efforts of Ferry and his father-in-law, Tacoma became the western terminus of the newly built Northern Pacific Railroad. However, later, due to the failing economy and the panic it caused, the railroad company closed. Ferry tried to bring the business back by working as a chief clerk, cashier, salesman, bookkeeper, and other positions at both the Northern Pacific Railroad Company and the Tacoma Land Company. He didn't have much success, and decided to retire and go to San Francisco. By 1888, as Ferry had expected, business and development in Tacoma improved. However, he wasn't ready to return home yet.

=== Travels and foundation of the Ferry Museum ===
Travelling through Europe, Ferry visited the Paris Exposition as the Washington Territory representative, though his personal agenda was to gather relics and works of art and bring them home to make Tacoma "the center of art in the northwest." Before his return to Tacoma in 1893, he lived in Geneva, Switzerland, collecting art pieces.

Ferry donated his collection of art and historic relics to Tacoma, and on June 16, 1893, it was officially registered as the Ferry Museum of Art. William B. Blackwell, Henry Drum, Clinton P. Ferry, James G. Swan, and Samuel Collyer were listed as trustees.

A collaboration between the Tacoma Academy of Sciences, the Tacoma Art League (later Tacoma Art Museum), and the Washington State Historical Society, the Ferry Museum opened on October 28, 1893, in the new Tacoma county courthouse. It moved to another site on June 25, 1895. Providing the resources to study local and worldwide history, geography, and culture, the museum's collection consisted of native and natural history showpieces, architectural casts, paintings, copies of European pottery, a collection of photographs and etchings, historical books, and an ax used to erect the first house in Tacoma. Besides displays, museum provided free art classes once a week.

In 1911, the museum, in association with the Washington State Historical Society, moved its collections to the Tacoma City Hall and the Pierce County courthouse. Afterwards, it was moved to the Washington State Historical Society building. Keeping the relationship tight, in 1931 the Ferry Museum made a big donation to the Society, which included the Historical Building south wing, the site for additional construction, a museum collection valued at approximately $100,000 ($2,644,000 in 2020 dollars (Note: The approximate value converted to 2020 dollars, based on a standard adjustment of the 1913 dollar value using the Consumer Price Index as calculated by United States Department of Labor.)), and a $10,000 ($264,000) transfer of the Frank B. Cole Endowment Fund, the income of which was to be spent only on the museum.

The first building that the Ferry Museum owned itself was erected in 1915, with money provided by Ferry's estate after his death and funds donated by other citizens.

Formation and early years of the Ferry Museum

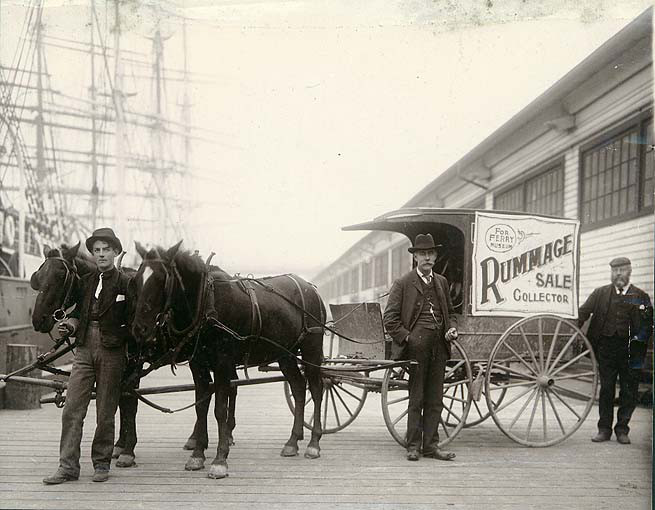
Rummage sale collector for the Ferry Museum, Tacoma, Washington, ca 1898

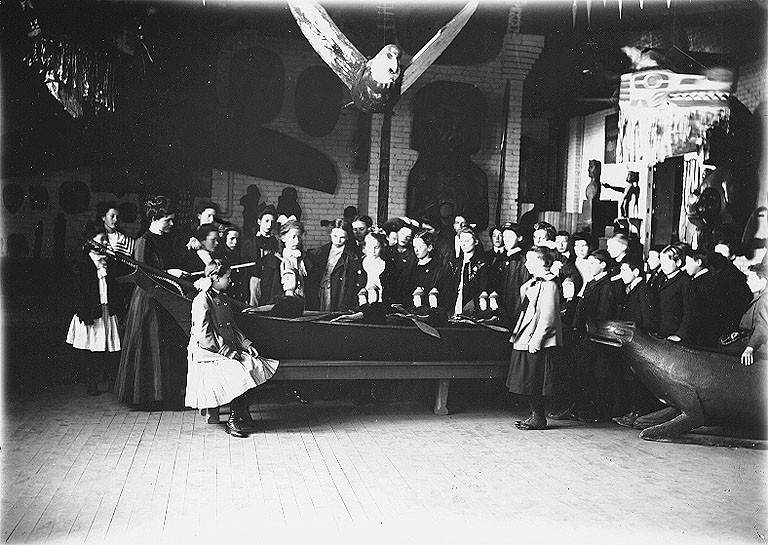
Interior of museum showing Northwest coast Native American artifacts, Washington, ca 1905

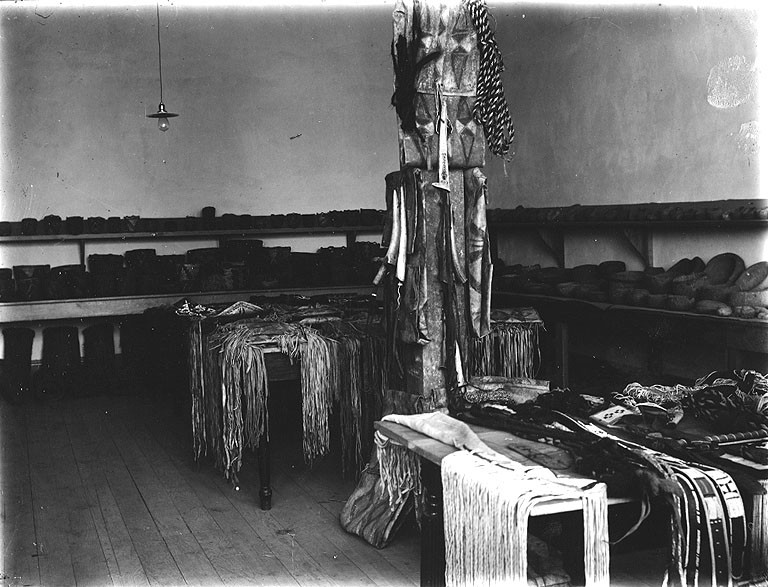
Interior of Ferry Museum showing Native American artifacts, Tacoma, Washington, ca 1911

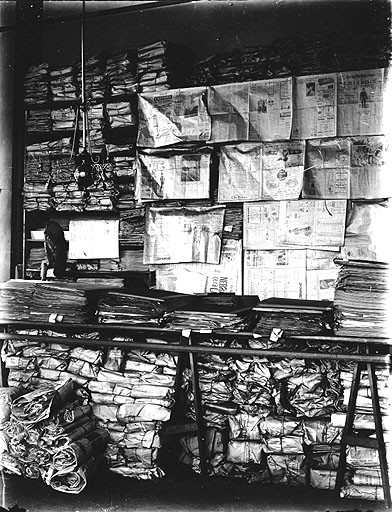
Interior of Ferry Museum showing shelves with papers and newspapers, Tacoma, Washington, ca 1911

== Secondary positions and political views ==
In the course of his life, Ferry had always been an adherent of Democracy. However, after the events leading to the American Civil War in 1861 he changed his mind and started supporting Republicanism and Lincoln's party.

Ferry's memberships and secondary positions included: president of the City Art Association, a member of the Independent Order of Odd Fellows, a Mason of high standing with the 32nd degree of Scottish Rite, a member of the Shrine, and a Knight Templar (a title he earned during service to the office of the Governor of Washington, Elisha P. Ferry, who was his uncle).

== Personal life ==
In 1862 according to one book and 1868 according to another, Ferry married Mary Ann Buckalew, the stepdaughter of General Matthew Morton McCarver. She died in 1874, leaving Ferry a daughter, May. He married for a second time to Eveline Trafton and had a son, Clinton Trafton Peyre Ferry; however, the couple later separated.

Due to his affection for the city, Ferry was often called "Tacoma" Ferry and "The Duke of Tacoma." During his travels, as he collected materials and wrote for magazines, he always used Tacoma letterhead, and he thought of Tacoma as of his only home.

== Death ==
On July 31, 1909, Clinton P. Ferry died of "an attack of dilation of the arterion" in San Diego, California, at the age of 73. His body was brought to Tacoma for burial.

Among other services, there was an eloquent tribute at the regular Order of the Eastern Star meeting in the Masonic temple. The remembrance speech contained the bright moments of his life and his contributions to the society, city, and country.

=== Inheritance ===
Ferry ordered to convert the value of his estate, which was about $60,000 ($1,586,000) into cash and divide it into 100 shares. He left nearly half of the shares to the Ferry Museum. His son, Clinton Ferry, received 14 shares, his daughter May, 8 shares, and his mother, Caroline P. Ferry, 10 shares. The rest of the shares, including diamonds, rings, and other personal valuables, he gave away to various relatives and friends.

== See also ==
- Tacoma, Washington
- Morton M. McCarver
- Elisha P. Ferry
- Henry Drum
- James G. Swan

== Literature cited ==
"CPI Inflation Calculator", Bureau of Labor Statistics, Washington: United States Department of Labor
Scripps, Edward, ed. (August 2, 1909), "Col. Ferry, Tacoma's best friend, dead", The Tacoma Times, Tacoma: E. W. Scripps Company, p. 5, ISSN 2158-4729, LCCN sn88085187, OCLC 17347623
Scripps, Edward, ed. (August 7, 1909), "Bulk of Ferry estate left to museum", The Tacoma Times, Tacoma: E. W. Scripps Company, p. 3, ISSN 2158-4729, LCCN sn88085187, OCLC 17347623
Stanford, Scott, ed. (March 20, 1912), "Five generations in this remarkable family", Fort Wayne Daily News, Wheeling: Ogden Newspapers, p. 4, ISSN 2572-2352, LCCN 82015310, OCLC 15667648
Stanford, Scott, ed. (January 22, 1915), "Passes away at 100 years", The Fort Wayne Sentinel, Wheeling: Ogden Newspapers, pp. 1, 2, ISSN 2572-2352, LCCN 82015310, OCLC 15667648
Skufca, Sherry, ed. (January 23, 1915), "Oldest woman in northern half of the state is dead", Fort Wayne Journal-Gazette, Fort Wayne: The Journal Gazette Co., p. 13, ISSN 2641-4120, LCCN 2019218564, OCLC 1052623743
Stanford, Scott, ed. (April 22, 1916), "The only authentic picture of Old Fort Wayne is unerthed in War Department", The Fort Wayne News, Wheeling: Ogden Newspapers, p. 12, ISSN 2572-2352, LCCN 82015310, OCLC 15667648
Bonney, William Pierce (1927), Hanford, Cornelius (ed.), History of Pierce County, Chicago: Pioneer Historical Publishing Company, LCCN 95109999, OCLC 10442109
Brock, Amber (November 30, 2018), Rousso, Nick (ed.), "Ferry Museum of Art opens in the Pierce County Courthouse in Tacoma on October 28, 1893.", HistoryLink, Seattle: History Ink, OCLC 47099920
Clevinger, Woodrow; Johnson, Claudius O.; Smith, Herndon; Gunther, Erna (January 1, 1942), Jensen, Merrill (ed.), "Washington State Historical Society News", Pacific Northwest Quarterly, 33 (1), Seattle: University of Washington: 117–120, ISSN 0030-8803, JSTOR 40486551, OCLC 2392232
Gunther, Erna (January 1, 1945), Gates, Charles M. (ed.), "Museums and the Teaching of History", Pacific Northwest Quarterly, 36 (1), Seattle: University of Washington: 79–80, ISSN 0030-8803, JSTOR 40486693, OCLC 2392232
Murry, Mary (August 11, 1909), Scripps, Edward (ed.), "Honor memory of Col. C. P. Ferry", The Tacoma Times, Tacoma: E. W. Scripps Company, p. 5, ISSN 2158-4729, LCCN sn88085187, OCLC 17347623
Prosser, William Farrand (1903), Lewis, Edward Gardner (ed.), A history of the Puget Sound country, its resources, its commerce and its people, New York City: Edward Gardner Lewis, LCCN 05013767
