= Guilfoil =

Guilfoil is a surname. Notable people with the surname include:

- Dwight D. Guilfoil Jr. (1922–1989), American businessman
- Kelly (née Guilfoil) Craft (born 1962), United States Ambassador to the United Nations and United States Ambassador to Canada
- O. D. Guilfoil (1863–1955), American politician
- Tyler Guilfoil (born 2000), American baseball player

== See also ==
- Guilfoile
