= 1889 Washington gubernatorial election =

- October 1, 1889
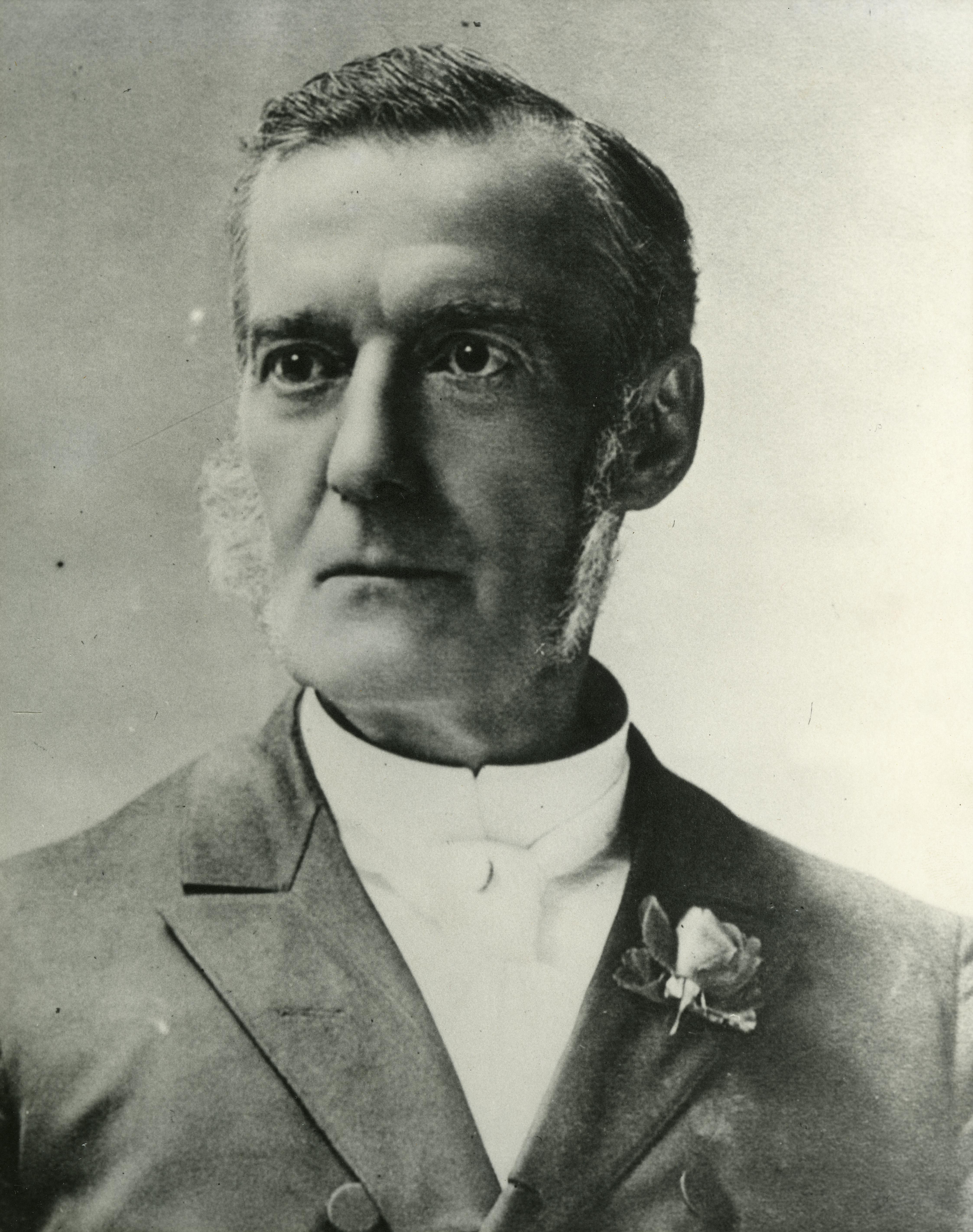

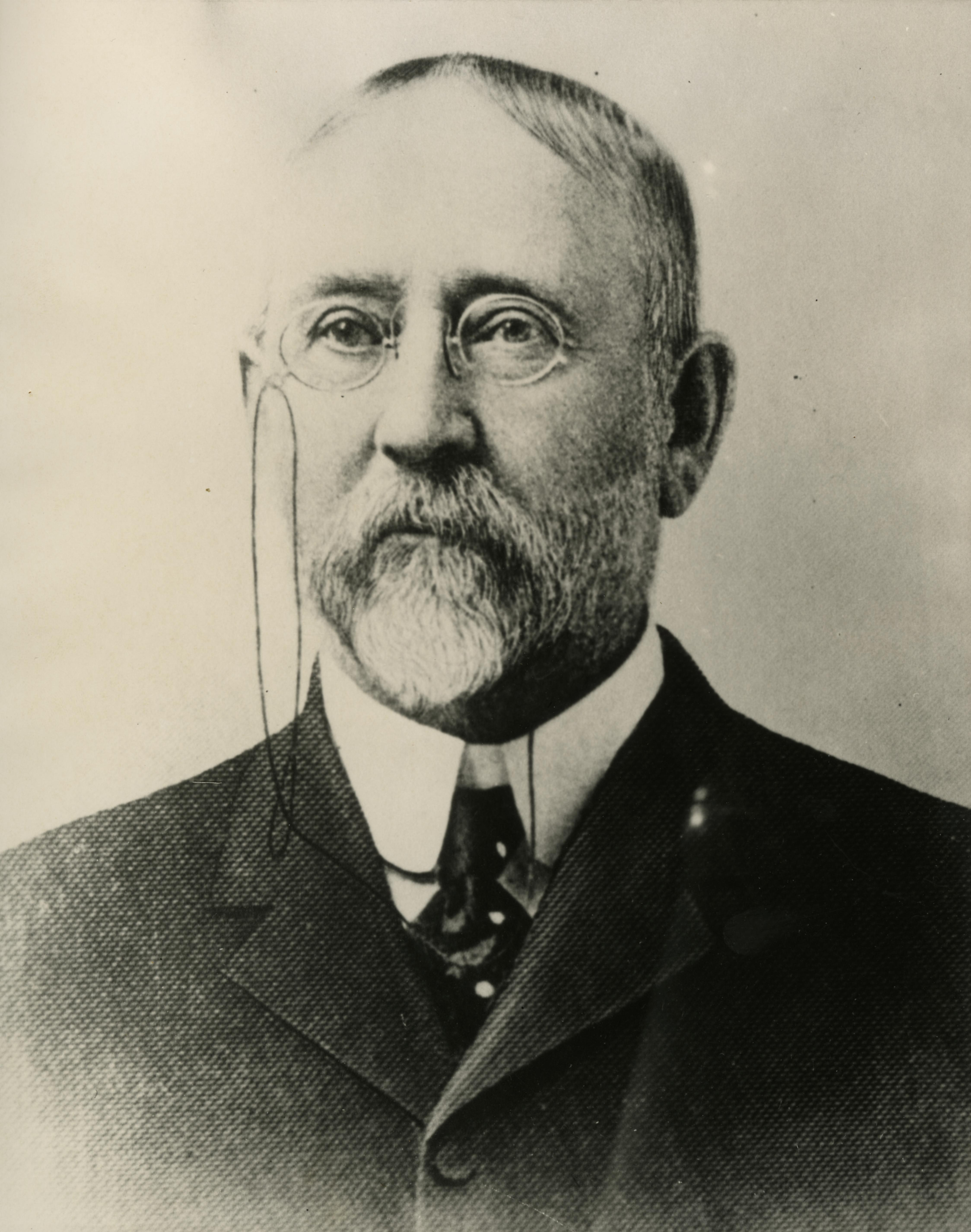
Nominee	Elisha P. Ferry	Eugene Semple
Party	Republican	Democratic
Popular vote	33,711	24,732
Percentage	57.67%	42.31%
- County results Ferry: 50–60% 60–70% 70–80% Semple: 50–60% 70–80%
Governor of Washington Territory before election
Miles Conway Moore
Republican
Governor of Washington
Elisha P. Ferry
Republican

The 1889 Washington gubernatorial election took place on October 1, 1889, to elect the first Governor of Washington shortly before it was admitted as a U.S. state. Both candidates, Republican Elisha P. Ferry and Democrat Eugene Semple, previously served as Territorial Governor, a position appointed by the President of the United States.

Ferry won the election by nearly 9,000 votes out of 58,000 cast, and took office in Olympia on November 18, 1889, a week after President Benjamin Harrison signed Washington's statehood into law. This was the only election in Washington's history in which King County did not cast the most votes of any county.

== General election ==
=== Results ===
1889 Washington gubernatorial election
Party	Candidate	Votes	%
Republican	Elisha P. Ferry	33,711	57.67%
Democratic	Eugene Semple	24,732	42.31%
	Scattering	11	0.02%
Majority		8,979	15.36%
Total votes		58,454	100.00%
Republican hold			

=== Results by county ===
County	Elisha P. Ferry Republican		Eugene Semple Democratic		Scattering Write-in		Margin		Total votes cast
County	#	%	#	%	#	%	#	%	Total votes cast
Adams	260	64.84%	141	35.16%	0	0.00%	119	29.68%	401
Asotin	171	57.77%	125	42.23%	0	0.00%	46	15.54%	296
Chehalis	897	59.33%	615	40.67%	0	0.00%	282	18.65%	1,512
Clallam	222	48.90%	232	51.10%	0	0.00%	-10	-2.20%	454
Clark	1,216	63.73%	692	36.27%	0	0.00%	524	27.46%	1,908
Columbia	666	50.68%	648	49.32%	0	0.00%	18	1.37%	1,314
Cowlitz	663	65.13%	355	34.87%	0	0.00%	308	30.26%	1,018
Douglas	353	57.12%	265	42.88%	0	0.00%	88	14.24%	618
Franklin	38	29.92%	89	70.08%	0	0.00%	-51	-40.16%	127
Garfield	517	55.29%	418	44.71%	0	0.00%	99	10.59%	935
Island	180	64.29%	100	35.71%	0	0.00%	80	28.57%	280
Jefferson	867	57.72%	633	42.14%	2	0.13%	234	15.58%	1,502
King	4,319	55.96%	3,398	44.03%	1	0.01%	921	11.93%	7,718
Kitsap	619	67.80%	289	31.65%	5	0.55%	330	36.14%	913
Kittitas	1,339	53.62%	1,158	46.38%	0	0.00%	181	7.25%	2,497
Klickitat	686	64.23%	382	35.77%	0	0.00%	304	28.46%	1,068
Lewis	1,219	58.41%	868	41.59%	0	0.00%	351	16.82%	2,087
Lincoln	1,104	56.13%	863	43.87%	0	0.00%	241	12.25%	1,967
Mason	322	51.44%	304	48.56%	0	0.00%	18	2.88%	626
Okanogan	322	60.41%	211	39.59%	0	0.00%	111	20.83%	533
Pacific	494	76.71%	150	23.29%	0	0.00%	344	53.42%	644
Pierce	4,362	54.72%	3,608	45.26%	1	0.01%	754	9.46%	7,971
San Juan	264	71.74%	104	28.26%	0	0.00%	160	43.48%	368
Skagit	949	62.64%	566	37.36%	0	0.00%	383	25.28%	1,515
Skamania	62	46.27%	72	53.73%	0	0.00%	-10	-7.46%	134
Snohomish	880	57.18%	659	42.82%	0	0.00%	221	14.36%	1,539
Spokane	3,256	58.88%	2,272	41.08%	2	0.04%	984	17.79%	5,530
Stevens	460	56.79%	350	43.21%	0	0.00%	110	13.58%	810
Thurston	1,067	59.54%	725	40.46%	0	0.00%	342	19.08%	1,792
Wahkiakum	284	65.59%	149	34.41%	0	0.00%	135	31.18%	433
Walla Walla	1,433	54.72%	1,186	45.28%	0	0.00%	247	9.43%	2,619
Whatcom	1,534	67.40%	742	32.60%	0	0.00%	792	34.80%	2,276
Whitman	2,149	53.82%	1,844	46.18%	0	0.00%	305	7.64%	3,993
Yakima	537	50.85%	519	49.15%	0	0.00%	18	1.70%	1,056
Totals	33,711	57.67%	24,732	42.31%	11	0.02%	8,979	15.36%	58,454
