= Senator Drum =

Senator Drum may refer to:

- Augustus Drum (1815–1858), Pennsylvania State Senate
- Henry Drum (1857–1950), Washington State Senate
