= Guilfoile =

Guilfoile is a surname. Notable people with the surname include:

- Bill Guilfoile (1931–2016), American public relations executive
- Kevin Guilfoile (born 1968), American novelist, essayist, and humorist

== See also ==
- Guilfoil
- Guilfoyle
