= Eugene Semple =

13th Territorial Governor of Washington

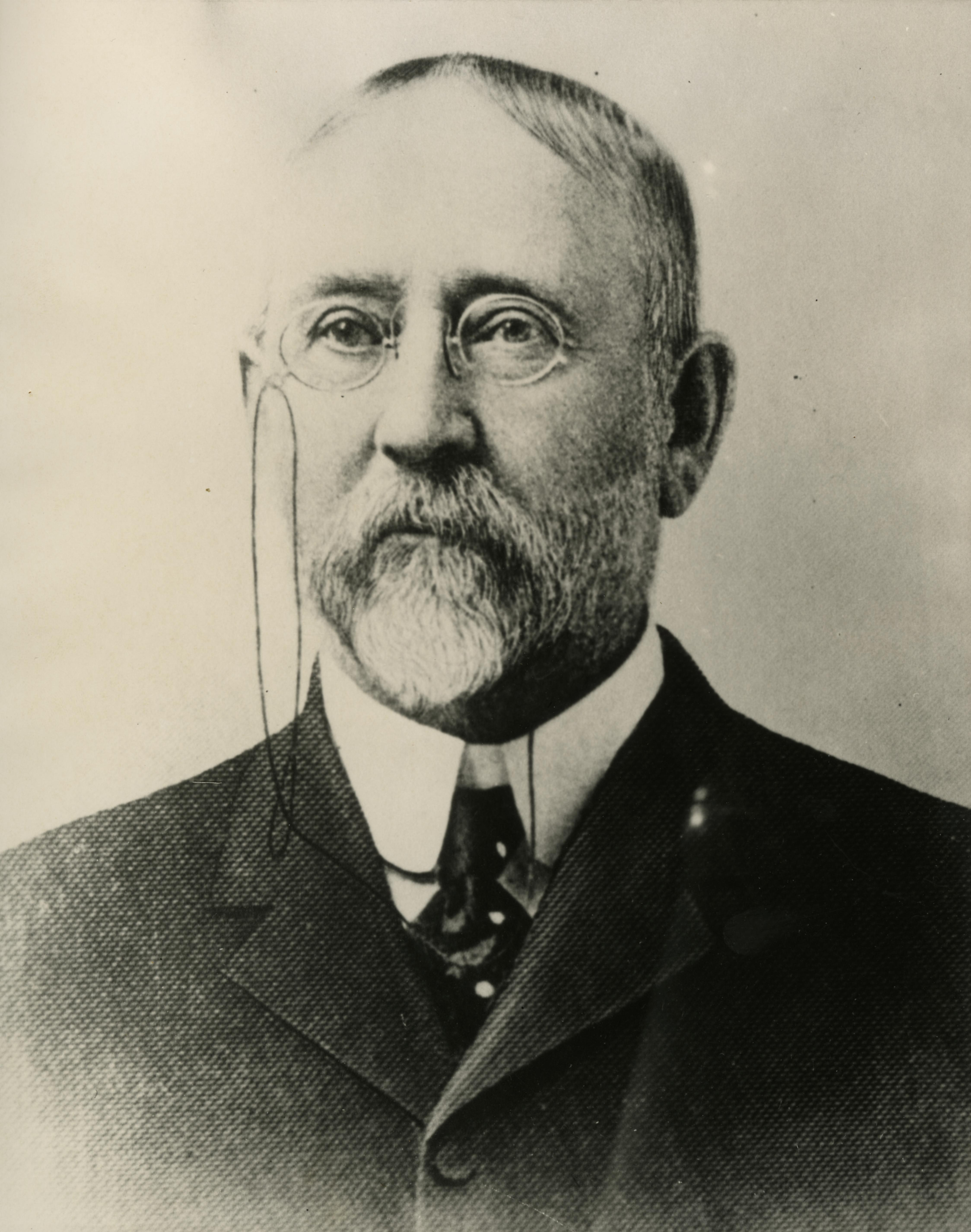

13th Governor of Washington Territory
- In office April 9, 1887 – April 9, 1889
- Appointed by: Grover Cleveland
- Preceded by: Watson C. Squire
- Succeeded by: Miles Conway Moore

Personal details
- Born: June 12, 1840 Bogotá, Colombia
- Died: August 28, 1908 (aged 68) San Diego, California, U.S.
- Party: Democratic
- Spouse: Ruth A. Lownsdale
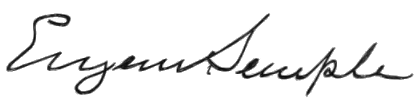
- Signature

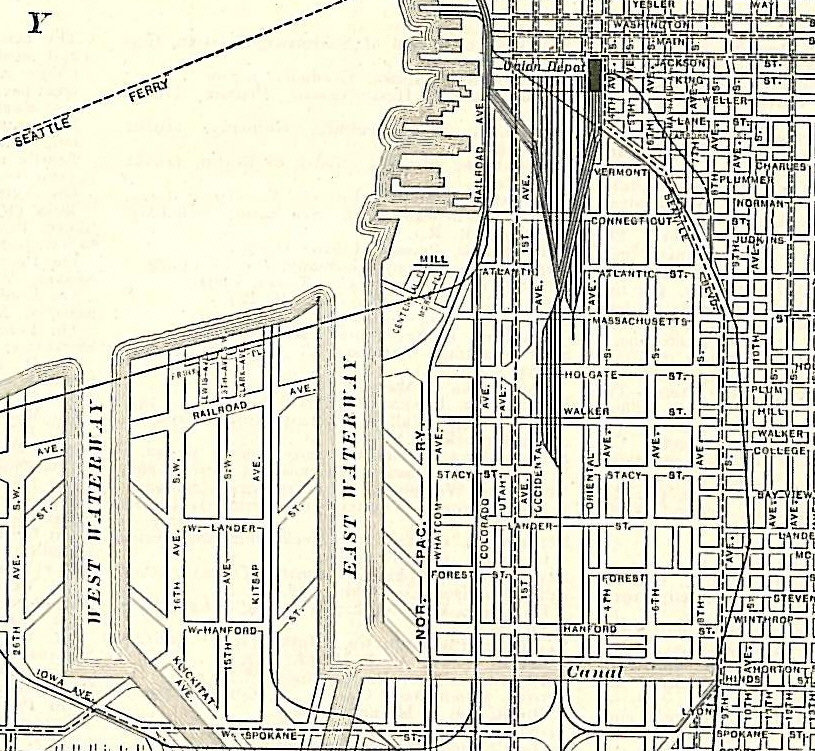
This detail from a 1911 map shows the Seattle's Industrial District (after the construction of Harbor Island). A portion of Semple's attempted canal can be seen at lower right, running east–west; north of that can be seen the large city blocks that characterize the former tidelands.

Eugene Semple (June 12, 1840 – August 28, 1908) was an American politician who served as the 13th governor of Washington Territory and the unsuccessful Democratic candidate to be the first governor of Washington State.

== Early life ==
Eugene Semple was born in Bogotá, Colombia, on June 12, 1840, to then minister to the Republic of New Granada, James Semple. The older Semple later served as chief justice to the Illinois Supreme Court and as U.S. Senator. The younger Semple received his education in Illinois before attending law school at St. Louis Law School. In 1864, Semple relocated to Portland, Oregon, where he was editor of the Oregon Herald and practiced law. He was the editor from 1869 until 1873, and in 1872 he became state printer for Oregon. In 1870, he married Daniel H. Lownsdale's daughter Ruth. After Semple quit the state printer job in 1874, the family relocated to Vancouver, Washington, across the Columbia River from Portland. Semple was in the lumber business there before relocating to Seattle.

== Washington ==
President Grover Cleveland appointed Semple as the Governor of Washington Territory in 1887, where he served for one term until April 1889. After Washington became a state in November of that year, Semple campaigned as the Democratic candidate to be the first Governor of the State of Washington, however he lost to the Republican Elisha P. Ferry.

In 1893, he successfully advocated a bill in the Washington State legislature to facilitate a means of financing privately owned canals by allowing them to sell reclaimed tidelands. With $500,000 of financing, he himself soon attempted such a canal connecting Elliott Bay to Lake Washington by cutting through Seattle's Beacon Hill: a more southerly route than the Lake Washington Ship Canal that was favored by Judge Thomas Burke and others associated with the Great Northern Railway, and which was ultimately built.

Work began July 29, 1895. Within 10 months nearly 100 acres (0.40 km^{2}) of tide flats had been filled. At that time, Burke managed to get a court injunction challenging the constitutionality of the 1893 law. A December 1898 decision went in Semple's favor, but the delay had put his company into financial difficulties. Semple scored some other legal victories and did well with the state government, but Burke ultimately won. Semple's activities affected railroad lands, giving Burke further opportunities for injunctions; Burke won over the Seattle city government (and ultimately the federal government) to the northern canal route. By May 1904, Semple's incomplete project was dead. The former Elliott Bay tidelands filled in by his attempt at building a canal soon became the basis of Seattle's Industrial District.

Some opponents of the project considered Semple's canal project a complete boondoggle. The Seattle Mail and Herald wrote in an unsigned article published June 8, 1904, "It is named the Seattle and Lake Washington Waterway Company, but its promoters never for a moment intended to create a waterway between Seattle's harbor and Lake Washington. The very name of it is a fraud and was created with intent to deceive. Under the guise of building a canal, it only aimed to fool the land owners into letting it disfigure the landscape, while it took dirt enough from them at condemnation prices to fill in the tide lands, for which service it is allowed over 18 cents per square yard and is secured by a preferred lien upon the land it fills."

Party political offices
First	Democratic nominee for Governor of Washington; 1889	Succeeded by Henry J. Snively
Political offices
Preceded by Watson C. Squire	Governor of Washington Territory; 1887–1889	Succeeded by Miles Conway Moore
