= John S. Baker =

American politician

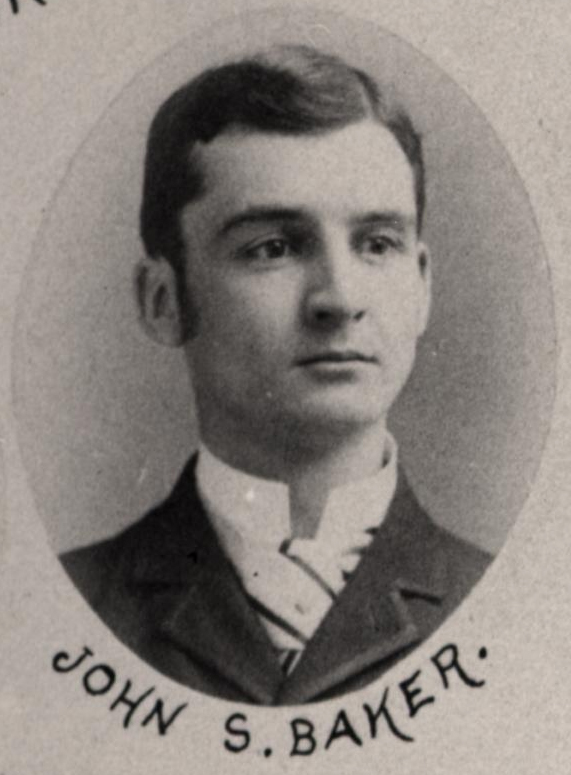
- Baker in 1891

Member of the Washington State Senate
- In office January 7, 1891 – January 9, 1893
- Preceded by: Samuel Vestal
- Succeeded by: Louis Foss
- Constituency: 22nd
- In office November 6, 1889 – January 7, 1891
- Preceded by: Constituency established
- Succeeded by: N. H. Owings
- Constituency: 18th

Personal details
- Born: John Sherman Baker; November 21, 1861 Cleveland, Ohio, U.S.
- Died: April 6, 1955 (aged 93) Tacoma, Washington, U.S.
- Party: Republican
- Occupation: Financier

John Sherman Baker (November 21, 1861 – April 6, 1955) was an American politician in the state of Washington. He served in the Washington State Senate from 1889 to 1893.

== Biography ==
John S. Baker was born in Cleveland on November 21, 1861.

He died in Tacoma on April 6, 1955.
