= Elisha P. Ferry =

1st governor of Washington

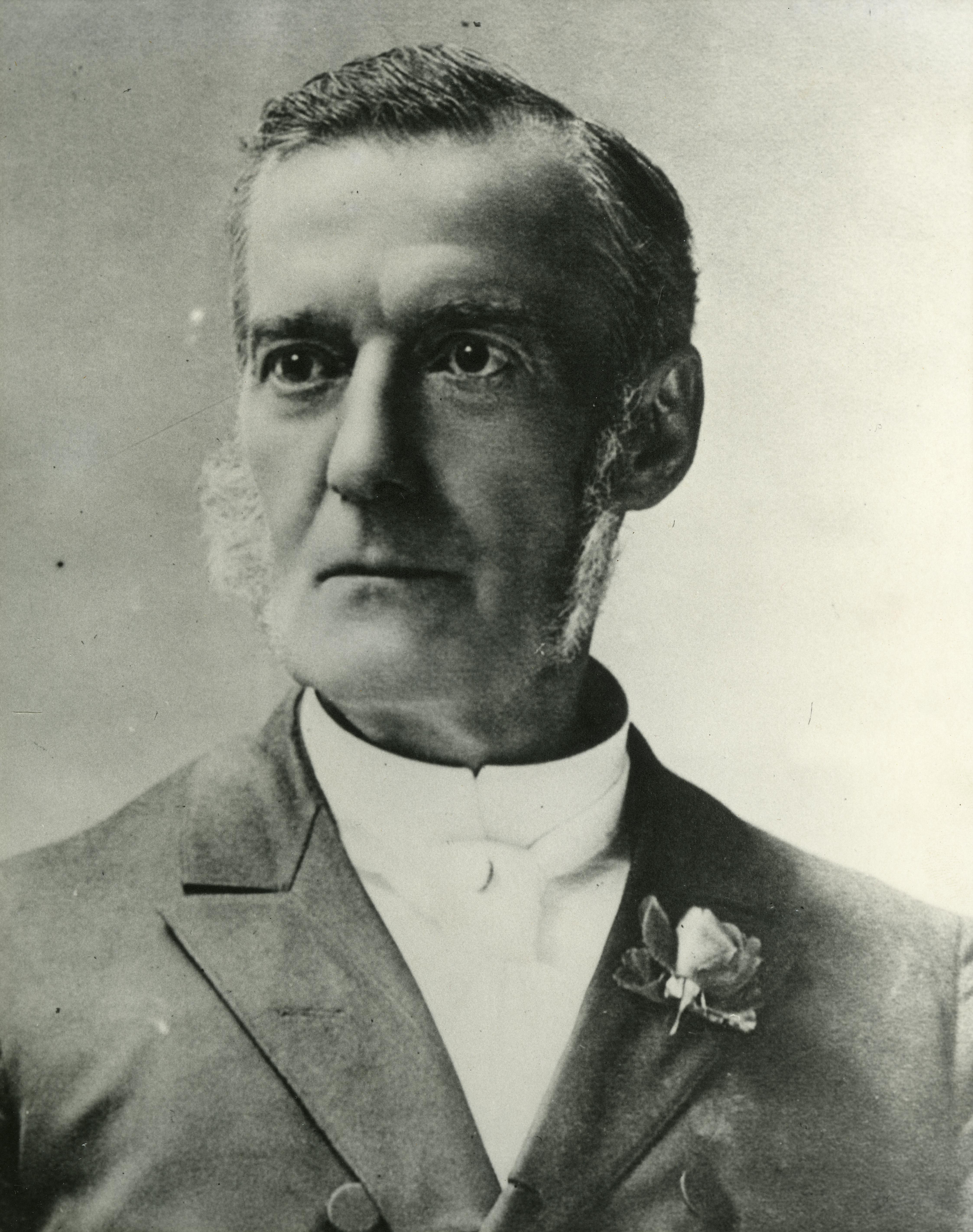

1st Governor of Washington
- In office November 11, 1889 – January 11, 1893
- Lieutenant: Charles E. Laughton
- Preceded by: Miles Conway Moore as Territorial Governor
- Succeeded by: John McGraw

10th Governor of Washington Territory
- In office April 26, 1872 – November 1, 1880
- Preceded by: Edward S. Salomon
- Succeeded by: William A. Newell

Personal details
- Born: Elisha Peyre Ferry; August 9, 1825 Monroe County, Michigan Territory, U.S.
- Died: October 14, 1895 (aged 70) Seattle, Washington, U.S.
- Party: Republican
- Spouse: Sarah Brown Kellog (m. 1850)
- Children: 5
- Relatives: Clinton P. Ferry (nephew)
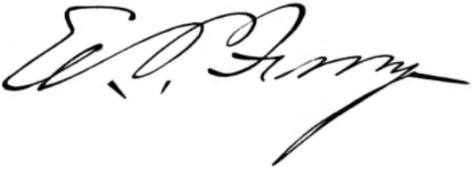
- Signature

Elisha Peyre Ferry (August 9, 1825 – October 14, 1895) was an American lawyer and politician who served as the first governor of Washington from 1889 to 1893. Ferry was a Republican who had twice been Governor of Washington Territory, the only one to serve two terms. On Washington's admission as a state on November 11, 1889, he became its inaugural governor, serving one term, stepping down in 1893 because of failing health.

== Early life and education ==
Elisha Peyre Ferry was born in 1825 in Monroe County in the Michigan Territory, south of Detroit. His parents were attorney Peter Ferry and Clarissa (Peyre) Ferry. They soon moved west to the small town of Waukegan, Illinois, where his father served as a judge.

Elisha graduated early from high school. He studied at Fort Wayne Law School, passing the bar examination at age twenty. Ferry had a successful practice as a lawyer in Waukegan for the next twenty-three years.

== Career ==
Ferry became the presidential elector of Illinois in 1852. He was elected as the first mayor of Waukegan in 1859, winning by a big majority. In 1862 he was a delegate at the Illinois State Constitutional Convention. During the American Civil War, Ferry joined the Union Army, helping to organize the Illinois regiment. He became friends with Ulysses S. Grant and Abraham Lincoln.

After the war, in 1869 President Grant appointed Ferry to the position of surveyor general of the rapidly developing Washington Territory, and Ferry and his family moved to Olympia, Washington, the newly designated state capital. In 1872 Grant appointed him as Territorial Governor and, after the end of his four-year term, reappointed him to the same position. Both as Surveyor and Governor, Ferry was closely involved with the building of the Northern Pacific Railway, and took a personal hand in planning the extension from Tacoma to Olympia.

As governor, Ferry was successful in putting the territory on a sound financial footing, by pressuring various counties to pay their taxes. His successor took office in a state that was almost debt-free. He also regulated the rail fares, and centralized the penal system to a state rather than a county basis.

=== Governor of Washington ===
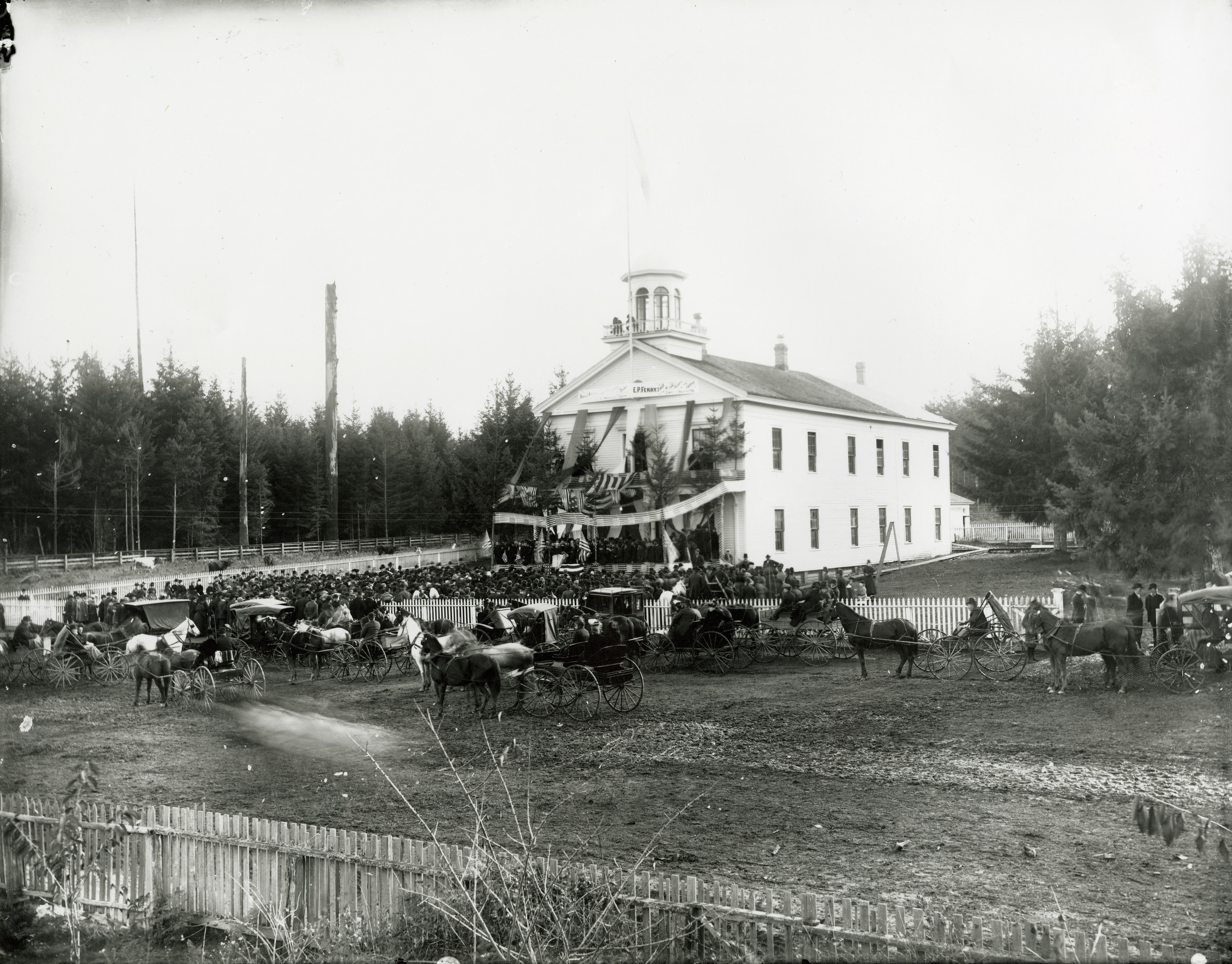
Inauguration at the Territorial Capitol Building, Nov. 18, 1889.

After a break from politics, working in Seattle in law and banking, Ferry was nominated as Republican candidate for the state governor, when Washington was granted statehood on November 11, 1889. He defeated the Democrat Eugene Semple, gaining 58 percent of the vote.

In his first summer, Ferry had to oversee reconstruction of three major cities that had been largely destroyed by fire: Seattle, Ellensburg, and Spokane Falls. The prompt replacing of timber buildings with brick and stone gave reassurance to the increasing numbers of residents moving into the state, some of them interested in acquiring public land. Ferry tried to manage the debate between supporters of business, wanting to privatize land (mainly people in the West of the state), and those who favored full public ownership (mainly in the East). The commission he appointed failed to reach a conclusion in the allotted time. Some critics believed that the administration was in the pocket of the corporations.

The same inference was drawn when Ferry called on the National Guard to put down a miners' strike. Following a costly fire, a local mining company had decided to cut expenses by replacing white mineworkers with black workers at lower wages. The longer the strike lasted, the more the employers saw the advantage of using black labor, and this became their standard policy.

His name is commemorated in Ferry County, named for him in 1899. He is also the namesake of Mount Ferry in the Olympic Mountains.

== Personal life ==
In 1850, Ferry married Sarah Brown Kellog (1827–1912). They had five children together.

All their children were given the middle name Peyre, which was his mother's maiden name, and is of French origin. French Canadian colonists were the first Europeans to settle in the Detroit area, on both sides of the Detroit River.

The Ferry family lived according to strict religious rules, and belonged to the Episcopal Church. In the state's capital Olympia, Ferry and his family were prominent members of St. John's Episcopal Church, where they were active both in church leadership and organization. Ferry was noted for his high ethical standards, both in his professional life and in the community.

Ferry also was a member of the Masonic Fraternity, which flourished in the nineteenth century in the United States. He served as Grand Master in 1878. He was a founding member of the Seattle Scottish Rite and held the rank of a Thirty-second degree Scottish Rite Mason.

After a decline in health, Ferry resigned from office. Two years later, he died on board a steamer in Puget Sound. His illness was likely a serious respiratory disease.

Party political offices
First	Republican nominee for Governor of Washington; 1889	Succeeded by John McGraw
