= Watson C. Squire =

12th Territorial Governor of Washington

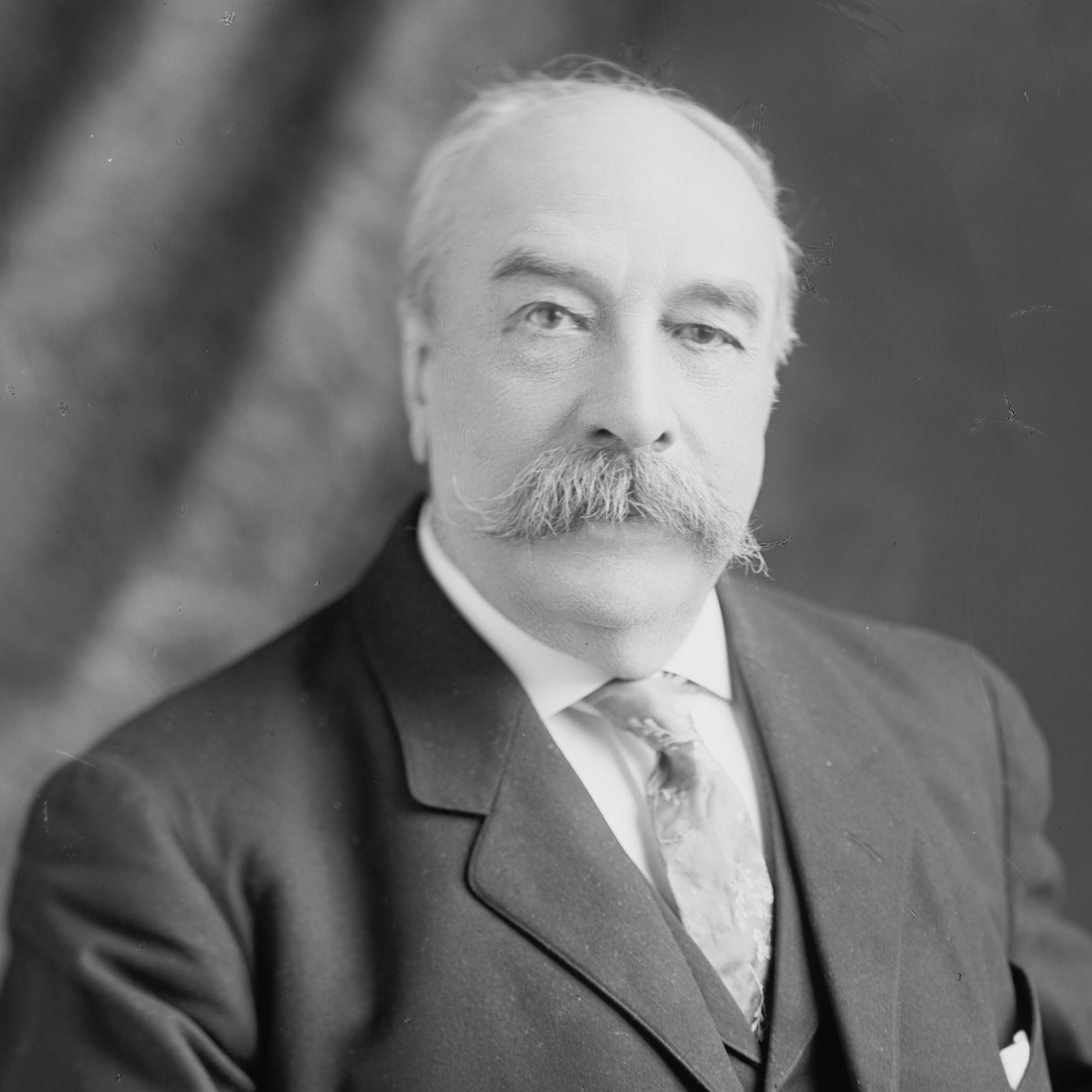

United States Senator from Washington
- In office November 20, 1889 – March 3, 1897
- Preceded by: Position established
- Succeeded by: George Turner

12th Governor of Washington Territory
- In office July 2, 1884 – April 9, 1887
- Appointed by: Chester A. Arthur
- Preceded by: William A. Newell
- Succeeded by: Eugene Semple

Personal details
- Born: Watson Carvosso Squire; May 18, 1838 Cape Vincent, New York, U.S.
- Died: June 7, 1926 (aged 88) Seattle, Washington, U.S.
- Party: Republican

Watson Carvosso Squire (May 18, 1838 – June 7, 1926) was an American Civil War veteran, twelfth governor of Washington Territory, and United States Senator from the state of Washington.

== Biography ==
Born in Cape Vincent, New York, Squire attended the public schools, Falley Seminary (in Fulton, New York) and Fairfield Seminary (Herkimer County, New York). He graduated from Wesleyan University in 1859 and was principal of the Moravia Institute.

== Career ==
During the Civil War, Squire enlisted in Company F, Nineteenth Regiment, New York Volunteer Infantry, in 1861; he was promoted to the rank of first lieutenant, and was mustered out the same year. He graduated from Cleveland Law School in 1862 and was admitted to the bar the same year, commencing practice in Cleveland, Ohio.

He rejoined the Union Army, soon thereafter, when the Union called for more men. Upon raising and organizing the 7th Independent Company of the Ohio Sharpshooters, Squire was commissioned a captain in 1862. He served with the Seventh Ohio Sharpshooters until 1865. During the Civil War, Squire participated in the battles of Nashville, Chickamauga, Resaca, and Missionary Ridge. During the latter campaign, "Squire served as judge advocate of the general courts martial. Later Squire was made judge advocate of the district of Tennessee," with headquarters in Nashville. "He served on the staff of Major General Rousseau as judge advocate and also under Major General Thomas during the siege and battle of Nashville." In 1865, he was discharged with the rank of captain and was subsequently Brevetted major, lieutenant colonel, and colonel.

From 1865 to 1879, Squire was employed with the Remington Arms Company as secretary, treasurer, and manager and purchased large holdings in the Territory of Washington in 1876. He married Ida Remington, daughter of Philo Remington, on December 23, 1868, and they had four children, Philo Remington, Shirley Herbert, Adine, and Marjorie.

Squire moved to Seattle in 1879 and was Governor of the Territory of Washington from 1884 to 1887. As governor, Squire confronted the difficult challenge of maintaining law and order during the anti-Chinese riots in Seattle and Tacoma. These riots began in 1885 and peaked on February 8, 1886. At that time, Squire declared martial law and began a system of military rule until order was restored. "Soon after President Cleveland issued a proclamation calling for the restoration of order, and when that was ignored, Federal troops were ordered into Seattle." Squire withdrew martial law on February 22, 1886, but by then most of the Chinese residents already had been expelled from the Territory, put on a ship, and sent to San Francisco. Subsequently, at the request of the U.S. State Department, Governor Squire investigated the losses of property by the Chinese residents of Tacoma, Seattle, and the surrounding area.

Upon the admission of Washington as a State into the Union in 1889, Squire was elected as a Republican to the U.S. Senate on a strong anti-Chinese platform. He was reelected in 1891 and served from November 20, 1889, to March 4, 1897. He was an unsuccessful candidate for reelection in 1897. While in the Senate, he was chairman of the Committee on Coast Defenses (Fifty-second and Fifty-fourth Congresses) and a member of the Committee on Transportation Routes to the Seaboard (Fifty-second Congress). He retired from the practice of law and devoted his time to the management of his properties in Seattle; he was organizer and president of the Union Trust Co. and the Squire Investment Co.

== Death ==
Squire died in Seattle, aged 88, and is interred at Evergreen - Washelli Memorial Park, Washelli Cemetery, Seattle.

== See also ==
U.S. Senate
| Preceded by New seat | U.S. senator (Class 3) from Washington; 1889–1897; Served alongside: John B. Allen, John L. Wilson | Succeeded by George Turner |
Political offices
| Preceded by William Augustus Newell | Governor of Washington Territory; 1884–1887 | Succeeded by Eugene Semple |
