= L. F. Thompson =

American politician

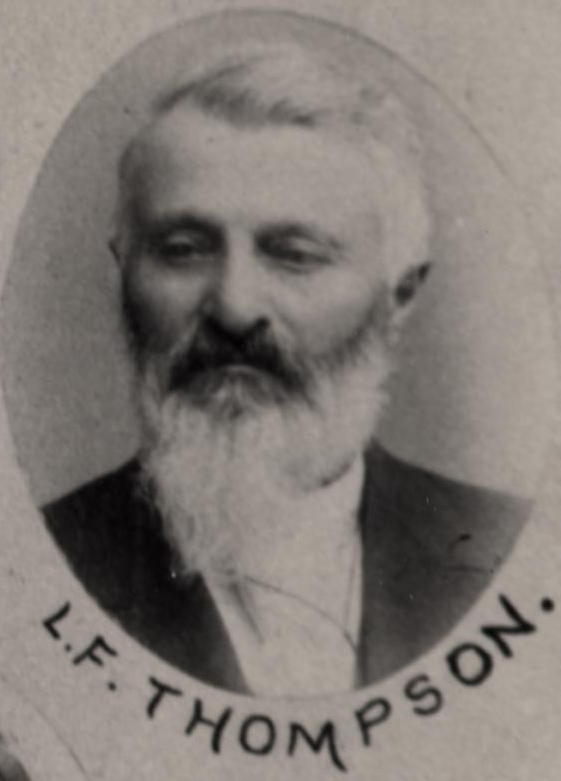
- Thompson in 1891

Member of the Washington State Senate
- In office January 7, 1891 – January 9, 1893
- Preceded by: O. D. Guilfoil; J. H. Jones; John R. Kinnear; William V. Rinehart; Wm. D. Wood
- Succeeded by: W. P. Sergeant
- Constituency: 19th
- In office November 6, 1889 – January 7, 1891
- Preceded by: Constituency established
- Succeeded by: N. H. Owings
- Constituency: 18th

Personal details
- Born: Levant Frederick Thompson; December 26, 1827 near Jamestown, New York, U.S.
- Died: May 27, 1894 (aged 66) Donald, Washington, U.S.
- Party: Republican

Levant Frederick Thompson (December 6, 1827 – May 27, 1894) was a pioneer, hop grower, banker, and American politician in the state of Washington. He served in the Washington State Senate from 1889 to 1893 (1889–91 for district 18, 1891–93 for district 19).

Levant Frederick Thompson was born Dec. 6, 1827 in Jamestown, New York. He was the fourth child of Harvey Thompson and Laura Cole, and the only son. After realizing he did not have the means to attend college, Levant left home in 1848 to "go west" and seek his fortune. He made his way from Jamestown to Placerville, California, working various jobs to "increase the contents of his purse". He traveled by steamboat, train, stage, team & wagon, horseback, and on foot. Levant came to Pierce County, Washington Territory in the early 1850s. He was the youngest man to serve in the first territorial legislature and later was the oldest state senator after statehood. He was elected to the state senate in the fall of 1889 to represent Pierce County. Levant was to serve with the Indian Department during one of his lean periods. He was the incorporator of the Merchants National Bank of Tacoma and served as its director. He was a director of the Washington National Bank and became president of the Farmers and Merchants Bank of King County.
