= Rix Mills, Ohio =

Unincorporated community in Ohio, U.S.

Coordinates: 39°55′27″N 81°44′46″W

Rix Mills is an unincorporated community in Muskingum County, in the U.S. state of Ohio.

== History ==
The community was named after Edmond Rix, the proprietor of a local mill. A former variant name was Rixville. Rixville was laid out in 1854. A post office called Rixs Mills was established in 1846. On 20 April 1858, land was acquired for a school in Rix Mills. The post office was renamed Rix Mills in 1892 and closed in 1902. The community has hosted several stores and a church, which to this day serves as a center of worship and community activities.

== Notable person ==
Miles Conway Moore, 14th Governor of Washington Territory, was born at Rix Mills in 1845.
