= Samuel Vestal =

American politician

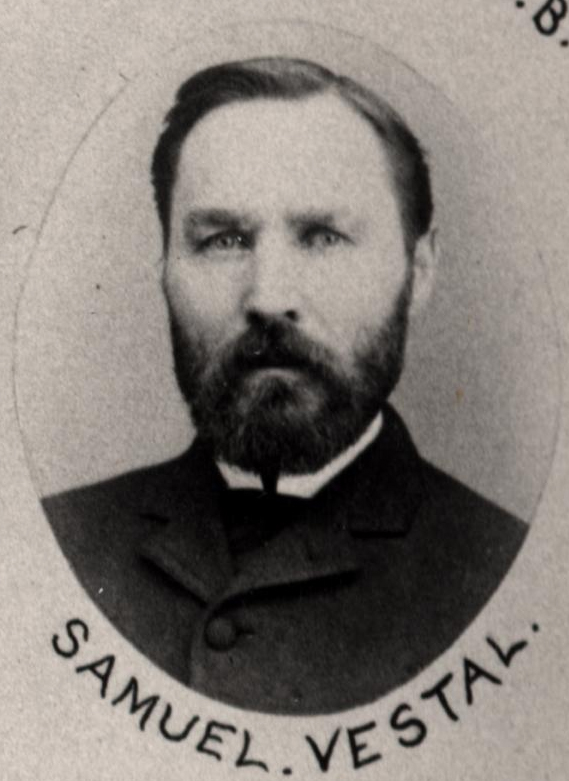
- Vestal in 1891

Member of the Washington State Senate
- In office January 7, 1891 – January 9, 1893
- Preceded by: Constituency established
- Succeeded by: John E. McManus
- Constituency: 31st
- In office November 6, 1889 – January 7, 1891
- Preceded by: Constituency established
- Succeeded by: John S. Baker
- Constituency: 22nd

Personal details
- Born: November 16, 1844 Clinton County, Ohio, U.S.
- Died: January 9, 1928 (aged 83) Snohomish, Washington, U.S.
- Party: Republican

Samuel Vestal (November 16, 1844 – January 9, 1928) was an American politician in the state of Washington. He served in the Washington State Senate from 1889 to 1893.
