= N. H. Owings =

American politician

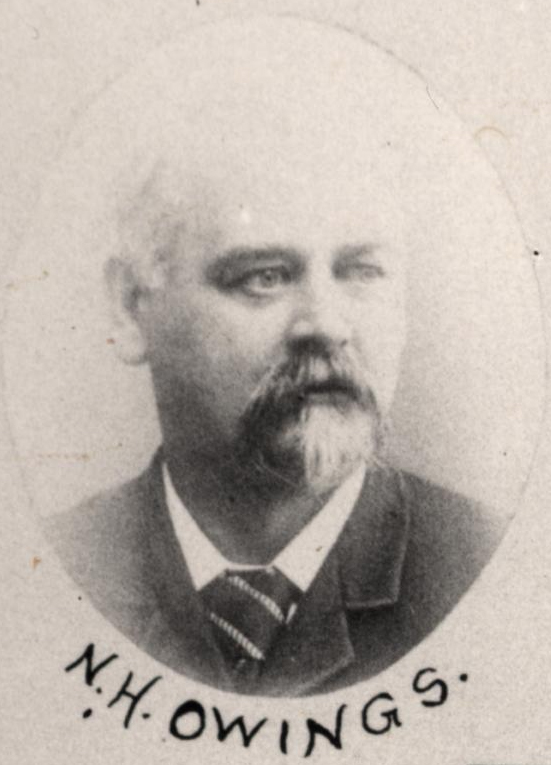
- Owings in 1891

Member of the Washington State Senate
- In office January 7, 1891 – January 9, 1893
- Preceded by: John S. Baker; Henry Drum; L. F. Thompson
- Succeeded by: J. C. Horr
- Constituency: 18th
- In office November 6, 1889 – January 7, 1891
- Preceded by: Constituency established
- Succeeded by: Henry C. Cooper
- Constituency: 16th

Personal details
- Born: December 21, 1836 Indianapolis, Indiana, U.S.
- Died: February 5, 1903 (aged 66) Tumwater, Washington, U.S.
- Party: Republican

Nicholas H. Owings (December 21, 1836 – February 5, 1903) was an American politician in the state of Washington. He served in the Washington State Senate from 1889 to 1893 (1889–91 for district 16, 1891–93 for district 18). He was a member of the Republican party.
