= Miles Conway Moore =

14th Territorial Governor of Washington

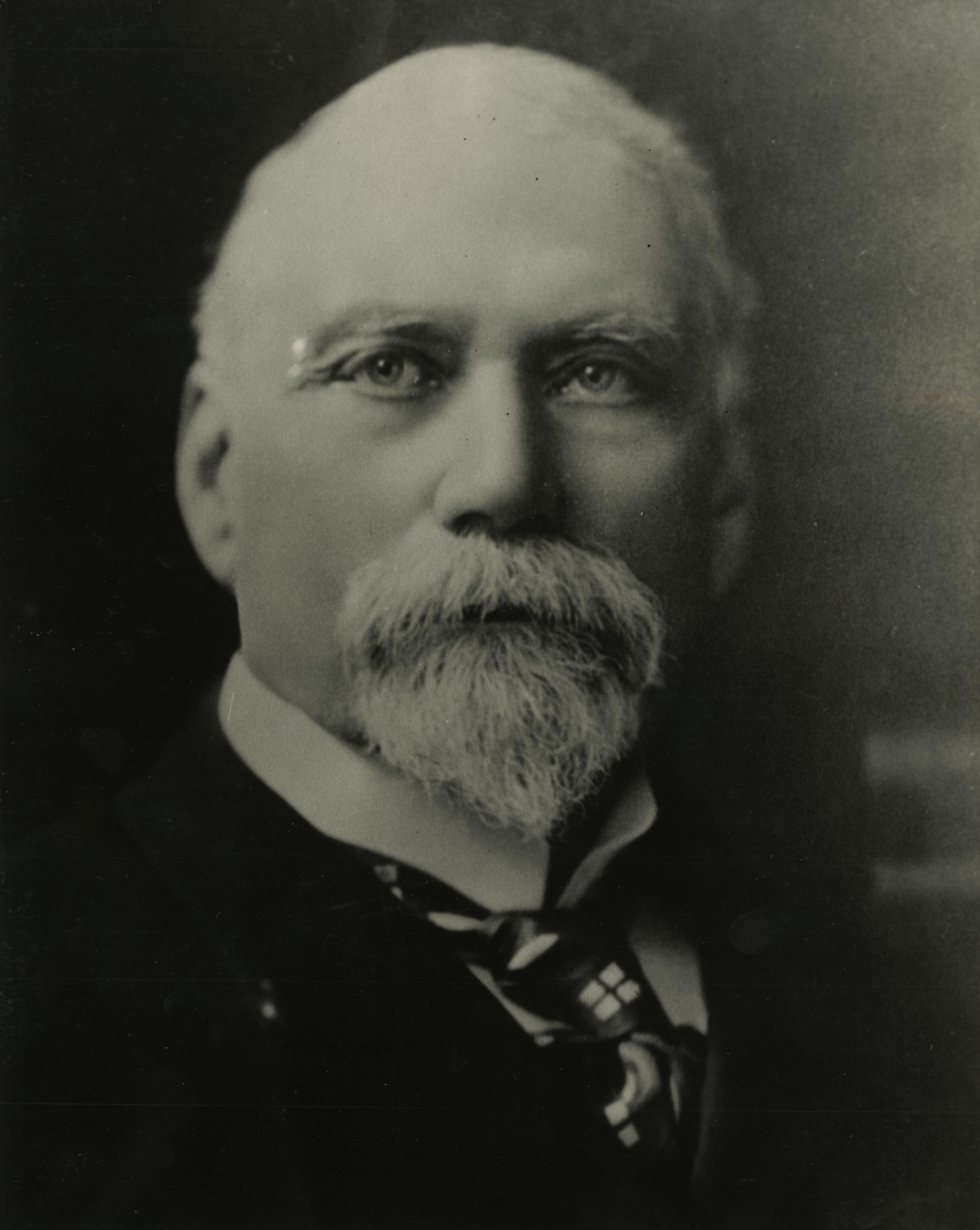

14th Governor of Washington Territory
- In office April 9, 1889 – November 11, 1889
- Appointed by: Benjamin Harrison
- Preceded by: Eugene Semple
- Succeeded by: Elisha P. Ferry as state Governor

Personal details
- Born: April 17, 1845 Rix Mills, Ohio, US
- Died: December 18, 1919 (aged 74) Walla Walla, Washington, US
- Party: Republican

Miles Conway Moore (April 17, 1845 – December 18, 1919) was an American politician who served as the 14th and last Territorial Governor of Washington Territory. He served seven months in office as governor, his two-year term ending prematurely when Washington attained statehood in November 1889.

== Biography ==
Born in 1845, in Rix Mills, Ohio, Moore moved to Wisconsin with his parents in 1857 and attended the Bronson Institute in Point Bluff, Wisconsin.

== Career ==
In 1863, Moore moved to Blackfoot, Montana and then to Walla Walla, Washington. Arriving penniless, he took a job as a clerk in a general store. In 1869, he partnered with H. E. Johnson and Company to form Paine Brothers and Moore, where he worked until 1877 as a dealer of general merchandise and farm supplies. He married Mary Elizabeth "Molly" Baker on March 26, 1873, and the couple had three sons, Frank Allen, Walter Baker, and Robert L.

Moore served two terms as a member of the Walla Walla City Council, 1877 and 1878. He was elected to the office of Mayor of Walla Walla in 1877.

In March 1889, Moore was appointed by President Benjamin Harrison as the final Governor of Washington Territory. Taking office in April 1889, he dealt with major fire disasters in Seattle, Spokane, and Ellensburg while preparing for the transition from territory to statehood on November 11, 1889.

Moore served as vice-president and president of the Baker-Boyer National Bank, and three years on the executive council of the American Bankers Association. In 1913, he was elected president of the board of overseers for Whitman College in Walla Walla.

== Death ==
Moore died December 18, 1919, in Walla Walla and is interred at Mountain View Cemetery, Walla Walla, Washington.

Political offices
Preceded by Eugene Semple	Governor of Washington Territory; 1889	Succeeded by Elisha P. Ferry as state Governor
