= O. D. Guilfoil =

American politician

Member of the Washington Senate from the 19th district
- In office November 6, 1889 – January 7, 1891
- Preceded by: Constituency established
- Succeeded by: L. F. Thompson

Personal details
- Born: Oscar Daniel Guilfoil; July 8, 1863 Rhinebeck, New York, U.S.
- Died: December 23, 1955 (aged 92) Ogdensburg, New York, U.S.
- Party: Republican

Oscar Daniel Guilfoil Sr. (July 8, 1863 – December 23, 1955) was an American politician in the state of Washington. He served in the Washington State Senate from 1889 to 1891. He died at a hospital in Ogdensburg, New York in 1955, where he had lived the last 10 years of his life. His obituary in The Post-Standard erroneously stated his age at death as 100, as his family stated that his birth date was unknown. He was buried in Rhinebeck.
