= J. H. Jones (Washington politician) =

American politician

Member of the Washington Senate from the 19th district
- In office November 6, 1889 – January 7, 1891
- Preceded by: Constituency established
- Succeeded by: L. F. Thompson

Personal details
- Born: January 1857 England, United Kingdom
- Died: July 23, 1934 (aged 77) Cinebar, Washington, U.S.
- Party: Republican
- Occupation: coal miner, dairyman

John H. Jones (January 1857 – July 23, 1934) was an American politician in the state of Washington. He served in the Washington State Senate from 1889 to 1891.
