= Guilfoyle =

Guilfoyle is an Irish surname. It originates from Irish Gaelic Mac Giolla Phoil, meaning "son (or descendant) of the follower of St. Paul". They were once a chief clan in Kings County, now known as County Offaly.

The surname may refer to:

- Brendan Guilfoyle (born 1984), Irish rugby league player
- George Henry Guilfoyle (1913–1991), American prelate of the Roman Catholic Church who served as Bishop of Camden
- Kimberly Guilfoyle (born 1969), American cable news personality
- Margaret Guilfoyle (1926–2020), British-born Australian Senator
- Merlin Guilfoyle (1908–1981), American prelate of the Roman Catholic Church who served as Bishop of Stockton
- Paul Guilfoyle (born 1949), American television and film actor
- Paul Guilfoyle (actor born in 1902) (1902–1961), American stage, film, and television actor
- Richard Thomas Guilfoyle (1892–1957), third Roman Catholic Bishop of Altoona
- Ronan Guilfoyle (born 1958), Irish jazz musician
- Tony Guilfoyle (born 1960), Irish actor
- William Guilfoyle (1840–1912), Australian landscape gardener and botanist
