= John R. Kinnear =

American politician

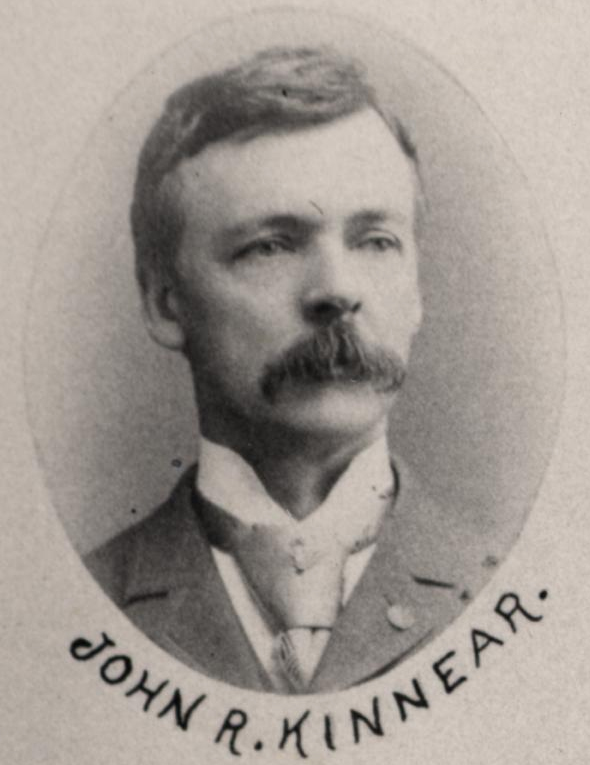
- Kinnear in 1891

Member of the Washington State Senate
- In office January 7, 1891 – January 14, 1895
- Preceded by: Constituency established
- Succeeded by: J. W. Range
- Constituency: 28th
- In office November 6, 1889 – January 7, 1891
- Preceded by: Constituency established
- Succeeded by: L. F. Thompson
- Constituency: 19th

Personal details
- Born: John Ritchey Kinnear; July 26, 1842 West Point, Indiana, U.S.
- Died: March 31, 1912 (aged 69) Seattle, Washington, U.S.
- Party: Republican

John Ritchey Kinnear (July 26, 1842 – March 31, 1912) was a politician in the state of Washington. He served in the Washington State Senate from 1889 to 1895.

He died at his home in Seattle on March 31, 1912.
