= Henry Drum =

American politician

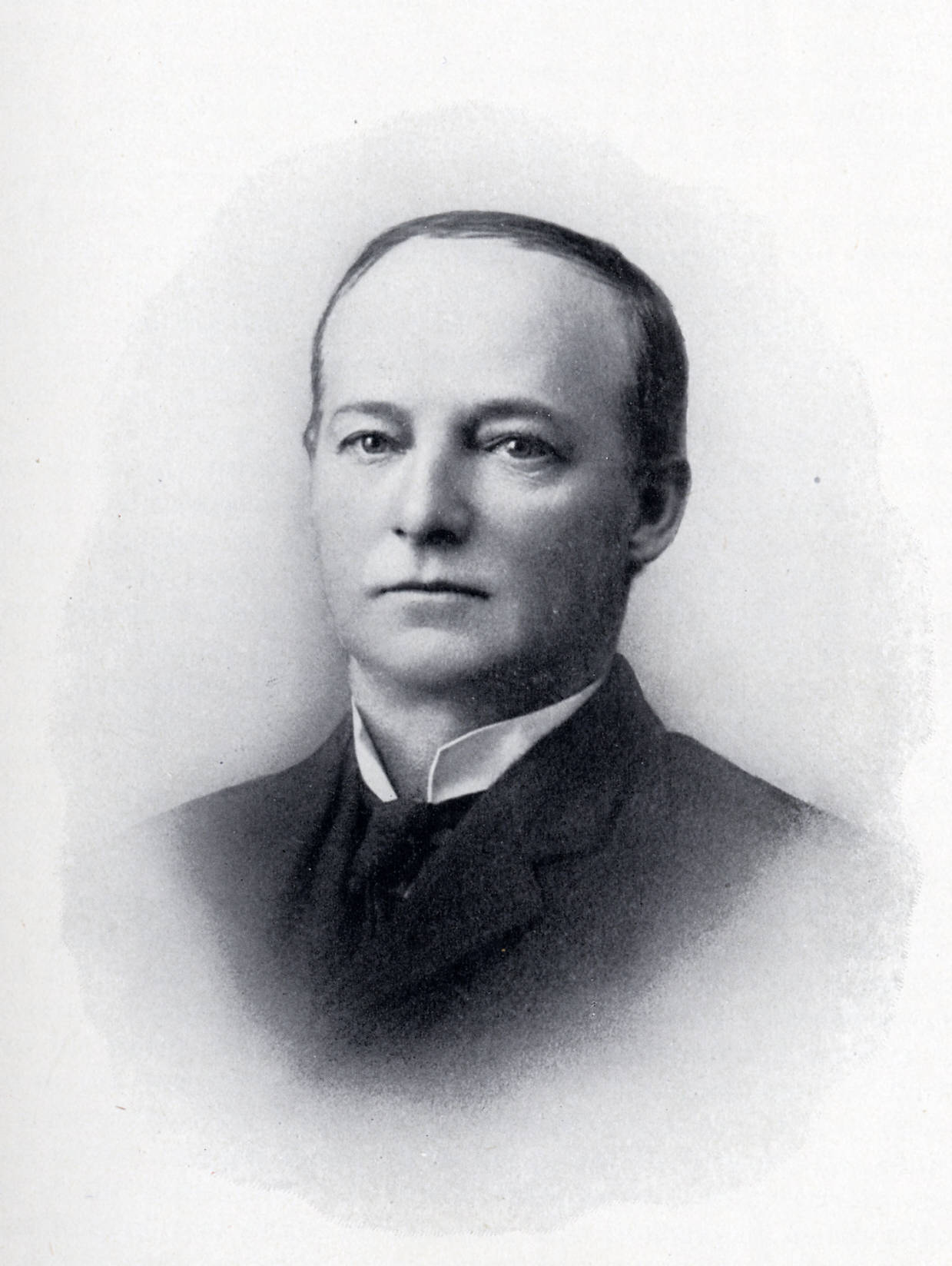

Member of the Washington State Senate
- In office January 7, 1891 – January 9, 1893
- Preceded by: Henry Landes
- Succeeded by: John G. Campbell
- Constituency: 21st
- In office November 6, 1889 – January 7, 1891
- Preceded by: Constituency established
- Succeeded by: N. H. Owings
- Constituency: 18th

Personal details
- Born: November 21, 1857 Girard, Illinois, United States
- Died: March 19, 1950 (aged 92) Tacoma, Washington, United States
- Party: Democratic
- Spouse: Jessie M. Thompson (m. 1884)
- Children: 5
- Occupation: Businessman, politician
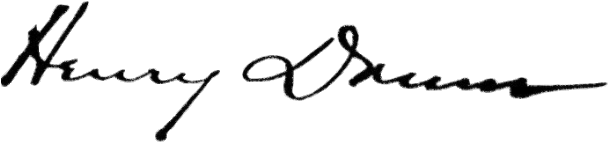
- Signature

Henry Drum (November 21, 1857 – March 19, 1950) was an American politician in the state of Washington. He served in the Washington State Senate from 1889 to 1893 (1889–91 for District 18, 1891–93 for District 21).

== Biography ==
Henry Drum was born in Girard, Illinois on November 21, 1857.

He married Jessie M. Thompson in 1884, and they had five children.

He worked as a teacher in Nebraska before becoming a banker in Tacoma, Washington. He also worked in insurance, and held interests in oyster beds.

He died in Tacoma on March 19, 1950.
