= List of elections in 1932 =

The following elections occurred in the year 1932.

== Asia ==
- 1932 Japanese general election
- May 1932 Hong Kong sanitary board election
- November 1932 Hong Kong sanitary board election
- 1932 Persian legislative election

== Europe ==
- 1932 Belgian general election
- 1932 Catalan regional election
- 1932 Danish Folketing election
- 1932 Estonian parliamentary election
- 1932 Estonian constitutional referendum
- 1932 Faroese general election
- 1932 French legislative election
- 1932 German presidential election
- 1932 Greek legislative election
- 1932 Greek Senate election
- 1932 Irish general election
- July 1932 German federal election
- 1932 Liechtenstein general election
- 1932 Maltese general election
- 1932 Newfoundland general election
- November 1932 German federal election
- 1932 Romanian legislative election
- 1932 Saar parliamentary election
- 1932 San Marino general election
- 1932 Swedish general election

=== Denmark ===
- 1932 Danish Folketing election
- 1932 Danish Landsting election

=== Greece ===
- 1932 Greek Senate election
- 1932 Greek legislative election

=== Germany ===
- 1932 German presidential election
- July 1932 German federal election
- November 1932 German federal election

=== United Kingdom ===
- 1932 Cardiganshire by-election
- 1932 Croydon South by-election
- 1932 Dulwich by-election
- 1932 Dunbartonshire by-election
- 1932 Eastbourne by-election
- 1932 Henley by-election
- 1932 Montrose Burghs by-election
- 1932 North Cornwall by-election
- 1932 Richmond (Surrey) by-election
- 1932 St Marylebone by-election
- 1932 Twickenham by-election
- 1932 Wakefield by-election
- 1932 Wednesbury by-election
- 1932 Westminster Abbey by-election

== North America ==
=== Canada ===
- 1932 Edmonton municipal election
- 1932 Manitoba general election
- 1932 Newfoundland general election
- 1932 Ottawa municipal election
- 1932 Toronto municipal election

=== United States ===
- 1932 New York state election
- 1932 United States elections
- 1932 United States presidential election

==== United States lieutenant gubernatorial ====
- 1932 Connecticut lieutenant gubernatorial election
- 1932 Illinois lieutenant gubernatorial election
- 1932 Louisiana lieutenant gubernatorial election
- 1932 Minnesota lieutenant gubernatorial election
- 1932 Missouri lieutenant gubernatorial election
- 1932 Nebraska lieutenant gubernatorial election
- 1932 Texas lieutenant gubernatorial election
- 1932 Wisconsin lieutenant gubernatorial election

==== United States gubernatorial ====
- 1932 Arizona gubernatorial election
- 1932 Arkansas gubernatorial election
- 1932 Colorado gubernatorial election
- 1932 Connecticut gubernatorial election
- 1932 Delaware gubernatorial election
- 1932 Florida gubernatorial election
- 1932 Georgia gubernatorial election
- 1932 Idaho gubernatorial election
- 1932 Illinois gubernatorial election
- 1932 Indiana gubernatorial election
- 1932 Iowa gubernatorial election
- 1932 Kansas gubernatorial election
- 1932 Louisiana gubernatorial election
- 1932 Maine gubernatorial election
- 1932 Massachusetts gubernatorial election
- 1932 Michigan gubernatorial election
- 1932 Minnesota gubernatorial election
- 1932 Missouri gubernatorial election
- 1932 Montana gubernatorial election
- 1932 Nebraska gubernatorial election
- 1932 New Hampshire gubernatorial election
- 1932 New Mexico gubernatorial election
- 1932 New York gubernatorial election
- 1932 North Carolina gubernatorial election
- 1932 North Dakota gubernatorial election
- 1932 Ohio gubernatorial election
- 1932 Rhode Island gubernatorial election
- 1932 Tennessee gubernatorial election
- 1932 Texas gubernatorial election
- 1932 United States gubernatorial elections
- 1932 Utah gubernatorial election
- 1932 Vermont gubernatorial election
- 1932 Washington gubernatorial election
- 1932 West Virginia gubernatorial election
- 1932 Wisconsin gubernatorial election
- 1932 Wyoming gubernatorial special election

==== United States House of Representatives ====
- 1932 United States House of Representatives elections
- 1932 United States House of Representatives elections in California
- 1932 United States House of Representatives elections in South Carolina

==== United States Senate ====
- 1932 United States Senate elections
- 1932 United States Senate election in Arizona
- 1932 United States Senate election in Arkansas
- 1932 United States Senate election in California
- 1932 United States Senate elections in Colorado
- 1932 United States Senate election in Connecticut
- 1932 United States Senate election in Florida
- 1932 United States Senate election in Idaho
- 1932 United States Senate election in Illinois
- 1932 United States Senate election in Indiana
- 1932 United States Senate election in Iowa
- 1932 United States Senate election in Kansas
- 1932 United States Senate election in Kentucky
- 1932 United States Senate election in Louisiana
- 1932 United States Senate election in Maryland
- 1932 United States Senate election in Missouri
- 1932 United States Senate election in Louisiana
- 1932 United States Senate election in Maryland
- 1932 United States Senate election in Missouri
- 1932 United States Senate election in New Hampshire
- 1932 United States Senate special election in New Jersey
- 1932 United States Senate election in New York
- 1932 United States Senate election in North Carolina
- 1932 United States Senate election in North Dakota
- 1932 United States Senate election in Ohio
- 1932 United States Senate election in Oklahoma
- 1932 United States Senate election in Pennsylvania
- 1932 United States Senate election in South Carolina
- 1932 United States Senate election in South Dakota
- 1932 United States Senate election in Vermont
- 1932 United States Senate election in Washington
- 1932 United States Senate election in Wisconsin

==== United States mayoral elections ====
- 1932 Auburn, Alabama municipal elections
- 1932 New York City special mayoral election
- 1932 San Diego mayoral election

== South America ==
- 1932 Chilean presidential election
- 1932 Costa Rican general election
- 1932 Ecuadorian presidential election
- 1932 Honduran general election
- 1932 Nicaraguan general election
- 1932 Panamanian general election
- 1932 Salvadoran legislative election
- 1932 Uruguayan general election

== Oceania ==
- 1932 Motueka by-election
- 1932 Southern Maori by-election

=== Australia ===
- 1932 East Sydney by-election
- 1932 Leichhardt state by-election
- 1932 New South Wales state election
- 1932 Queensland state election
- 1932 Roebourne state by-election
- 1932 Victorian state election

== See also ==
- Category:1932 elections
