= 1932 United States gubernatorial elections =

| ← 1931 | November 8, 1932; September 12, 1932 (ME) | 1933 → |

35 governorships (Note: Including a special election in Wyoming.)
| | Majority party | Minority party |
|---|---|---|
| Party | Democratic | Republican |
| Seats before | 27 | 19 |
| Seats after | 38 | 8 |
| Seat change | ▲11 | ▼11 |
| Seats up | 18 | 16 |
| Seats won | 29 | 5 |
| | Third party |
| Party | Farmer–Labor |
| Seats before | 1 |
| Seats after | 1 |
| Seat change | Steady |
| Seats up | 1 |
| Seats won | 1 |
- Democratic gain Democratic hold Republican gain Republican hold Farmer–Labor hold

United States gubernatorial elections were held in 1932, in 35 states, concurrent with the House, Senate elections and presidential election, on November 8, 1932. Elections took place on September 12 in Maine.

== Results ==
| State | Incumbent | Party | Status | Opposing candidates |
|---|---|---|---|---|
| Arizona | George W. P. Hunt | Democratic | Defeated in Democratic primary, Democratic victory | Benjamin Baker Moeur (Democratic) 63.22% J. C. "Jack" Kinney (Republican) 35.43% Lawrence McGivern (Socialist) 0.69% Andrew Bettwy (Arizona Progressive Democrat) 0.49% Martin Gehon (Communist) 0.17% |
| Arkansas | Junius Marion Futrell | Democratic | Re-elected, 90.39% | J. O. Livesay (Republican) 8.91% Scattering 0.70% |
| Colorado | Billy Adams | Democratic | Retired, Democratic victory | Edwin Carl Johnson (Democratic) 57.23% James D. Parriott (Republican) 40.78% Morton Alexander (Socialist) 1.39% William Penn Collins (Farmer Labor) 0.38% William R. Dietrich (Communist) 0.23% |
| Connecticut | Wilbur L. Cross | Democratic | Re-elected, 48.44% | John H. Trumbull (Republican) 46.62% Jasper McLevy (Socialist) 3.47% Albert Levitt (Independent Republican) 0.86% Michael P. O'Lean (Socialist Labor) 0.39% Isadore Wofsy (Communist) 0.23% |
| Delaware | C. Douglass Buck | Republican | Re-elected, 54.23% | Landreth L. Layton (Democratic) 44.88% Fred W. Whiteside (Socialist) 0.79%: Thomas (Communist) 0.11% |
| Florida | Doyle E. Carlton | Democratic | Term-limited, Democratic victory | David Sholtz (Democratic) 66.62% W. J. Howey (Republican) 33.38% |
| Georgia | Richard Russell Jr. | Democratic | Retired to run for U.S. senator, Democratic victory | Eugene Talmadge (Democratic) 100.00% (Democratic primary results); Eugene Talmadge 42.02% (264); Hosea Abit Nix 28.38% (94); Thomas W. Hardwick 12.73% (30); John N. Holder 7.11% (10); H. B. Edwards 4.66% (8); John I. Kelly 4.37% (4); Scattering 0.73% |
| Idaho | C. Ben Ross | Democratic | Re-elected, 61.73% | Byron Defenbach (Republican) 36.44% Scattering 1.84% |
| Illinois | Louis Lincoln Emmerson | Republican | Retired, Democratic victory | Henry Horner (Democratic) 57.62% Len Small (Republican) 40.71% Roy E. Burt (Socialist) 1.18% Leondies McDonald (Communist) 0.37% J. E. Procum (Socialist Labor) 0.09% W. W. O'Brien (Independent) 0.04% |
| Indiana | Harry G. Leslie | Republican | Term-limited, Democratic victory | Paul V. McNutt (Democratic) 55.02% Raymond S. Springer (Republican) 42.75% Powers Hapgood (Socialist) 1.20% F. W. Lough (Prohibition) 0.59% Ward B. Hiner (National) 0.20% Theodore Luesse (Communist) 0.14% Charley Lynch (Socialist Labor) 0.12% |
| Iowa | Dan W. Turner | Republican | Defeated, 47.23% | Clyde L. Herring (Democratic) 52.77% |
| Kansas | Harry H. Woodring | Democratic | Defeated, 34.12% | Alfred M. Landon (Republican) 34.82% John R. Brinkley (Independent) 30.58% H. M. Perkins (Socialist) 0.49% |
| Maine (held September 12, 1932) | William Tudor Gardiner | Republican | Retired, Democratic victory | Louis J. Brann (Democratic) 50.25% Burleigh Martin (Republican) 49.28% Frank H. Maxfield (Socialist) 0.47% |
| Massachusetts | Joseph B. Ely | Democratic | Re-elected, 52.76% | William S. Youngman (Republican) 45.03% Alfred B. Lewis (Socialist) 1.57% John J. Ballam (Communist) 0.39% Charles S. Oram (Socialist Labor) 0.24% Scattering 0.01% |
| Michigan | Wilber M. Brucker | Republican | Defeated, 43.12% | William A. Comstock (Democratic) 54.92% John Panzer (Socialist) 1.24% William Reynolds (Communist) 0.49% Charles Elwood Holmes (Prohibition) 0.13% Robert Fraser (Socialist Labor) 0.07% Albert T. Renner (Proletarian) 0.02% |
| Minnesota | Floyd B. Olson | Farmer-Labor | Re-elected, 50.57% | Earle Brown (Republican) 32.34% John E. Regan (Democratic) 16.44% William Schneiderman (Communist) 0.47% John P. Johnson (Industrial) 0.18% |
| Missouri | Henry S. Caulfield | Republican | Term-limited, Democratic victory | Guy Brasfield Park (Democratic) 60.17% Edward H. Winter (Republican) 39.10% Louis Martin Wolf (Socialist) 0.68% Owen W. Penney (Communist) 0.03% William Wesley Cox (Socialist Labor) 0.02% |
| Montana | John E. Erickson | Democratic | Re-elected, 48.50% | Frank A. Hazelbaker (Republican) 46.73% Chris Yegen (Socialist) 2.92% Rodney Salisbury (Communist) 0.93% W. R. Duncan (Liberty) 0.93% |
| Nebraska | Charles W. Bryan | Democratic | Re-elected, 52.53% | Dwight P. Griswold (Republican) 46.28% John M. Paul (Socialist) 1.19% |
| New Hampshire | John Gilbert Winant | Republican | Re-elected, 54.20% | Henri Ledoux (Democratic) 45.42% Frank T. Butler (Socialist) 0.27% William J. Wilgus Jr. (Communist) 0.12% |
| New Mexico | Arthur Seligman | Democratic | Re-elected, 54.82% | Richard C. Dillon (Republican) 44.19% E. E. Frost (Socialist) 0.70% Thomas C. Cullender (Liberty) 0.23% W. F. Richardson (Communist) 0.07% |
| New York | Franklin D. Roosevelt | Democratic | Retired to run for U.S. President, Democratic victory | Herbert H. Lehman (Democratic) 56.69% William J. Donovan (Republican) 38.62% Louis Waldman (Socialist) 2.0% John F. Vichert (Law Preservation) 1.78% Israel Amter (Communist) 0.56% Aaron M. Orange (Socialist Labor) 0.15% |
| North Carolina | Oliver Max Gardner | Democratic | Term-limited, Democratic victory | John C. B. Ehringhaus (Democratic) 70.07% Clifford C. Frazier (Republican) 29.93% |
| North Dakota | George F. Shafer | Republican | Retired to run for U.S. Senate, Republican victory | William Langer (Republican) 54.75% Herbert C. Depuy (Democratic) 44.97% Andrew Omholt (Communist) 0.28% |
| Ohio | George White | Democratic | Re-elected, 52.82% | David S. Ingalls (Republican) 44.85% Joseph W. Sharts (Socialist) 1.26% Aaron S. Watkins (Prohibition) 0.76% John Marshall (Communist) 0.25% William Woodhouse (Socialist Labor) 0.07% |
| Rhode Island | Norman S. Case | Republican | Defeated, 43.50% | Theodore F. Green (Democratic) 55.20% Frederick W. Hurst (Socialist) 0.73% James P. Reid (Communist) 0.21% Roscoe W. Phillips (Prohibition) 0.19% Charles F. Bishop (Socialist Labor) 0.17% |
| South Dakota | Warren E. Green | Republican | Defeated, 42.40% | Tom Berry (Democratic) 55.63% H. O. Stevens (Liberty) 1.75% Helen Tangen (Independent) 0.22% |
| Tennessee | Henry Hollis Horton | Democratic | Retired, Democratic victory | Hill McAlister (Democratic) 42.75% John McCall (Republican) 29.79% Lewis S. Pope (Independent) 27.05% John H. Compton (Independent) 0.32% Charles R. Marlow (Independent) 0.09% |
| Texas | Ross S. Sterling | Democratic | Defeated in Democratic primary, Democratic victory | Miriam A. Ferguson (Democratic) 61.98% Orville Bullington (Republican) 37.68% George C. Edwards (Socialist) 0.22% George W. Armstrong (Jacksonian) 0.09% Philip L. Howe (Communist) 0.02% Otho L. Heitt (Liberty) 0.02% |
| Utah | George Dern | Democratic | Retired, Democratic victory | Henry H. Blood (Democratic) 56.39% William W. Seegmiller (Republican) 41.76% A. L. Porter (Socialist) 1.36% Marvin P. Bales (Communist) 0.49% |
| Vermont | Stanley Calef Wilson | Republican | Re-elected, 61.69% | James Patrick Leamy (Democratic) 37.20% Frederick W. Suitor (Socialist) 1.09% Scattering 0.02% |
| Washington | Roland H. Hartley | Republican | Defeated in Republican primary, Democratic victory | Clarence D. Martin (Democratic) 57.29% John Arthur Gellatly (Republican) 33.75% Luvern Clyde Hicks (Liberty) 6.79% John F. McKay (Socialist) 1.63% Fred E. Walker (Communist) 0.41% Edward Kriz (Socialist Labor) 0.07% Maslen Meade (Independent) 0.06% |
| West Virginia | William G. Conley | Republican | Term-limited, Democratic victory | Herman G. Kump (Democratic) 53.77% T. C. Townsend (Republican) 45.80% J. H. Snider (Socialist) 0.37% Miles Stone (Communist) 0.06% |
| Wisconsin | Philip La Follette | Republican | Defeated in Republican primary, Democratic victory | Albert George Schmedeman (Democratic) 52.48% Walter J. Kohler Sr. (Republican) 41.87% Frank B. Metcalfe (Socialist) 5.07% William C. Dean (Prohibition) 0.28% Fred B. Blair (Communist) 0.26% Joseph Ehrhardt (Socialist Labor) 0.04% Scattering 0.01% |
| Wyoming (special election) | Alonzo M. Clark | Republican | Defeated in Republican primary, Democratic victory | Leslie A. Miller (Democratic) 50.85% Harry R. Weston (Republican) 47.22% A. O. Blow (Socialist) 1.74% Merton Willer (Communist) 0.19% |

== See also ==
- 1932 United States elections
  - 1932 United States presidential election
  - 1932 United States Senate elections
  - 1932 United States House of Representatives elections
