= 1920 Washington gubernatorial election =

- November 2, 1920
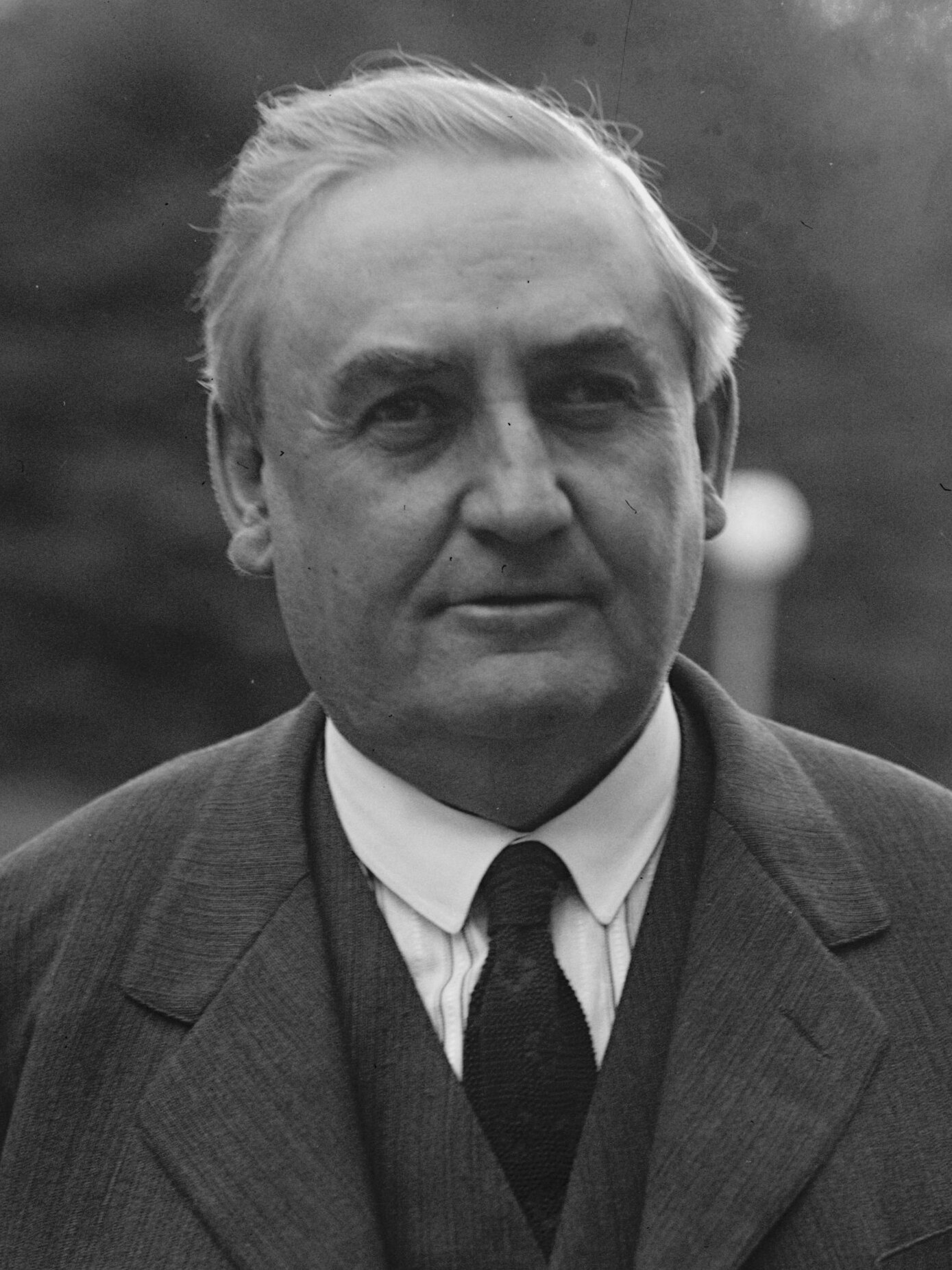

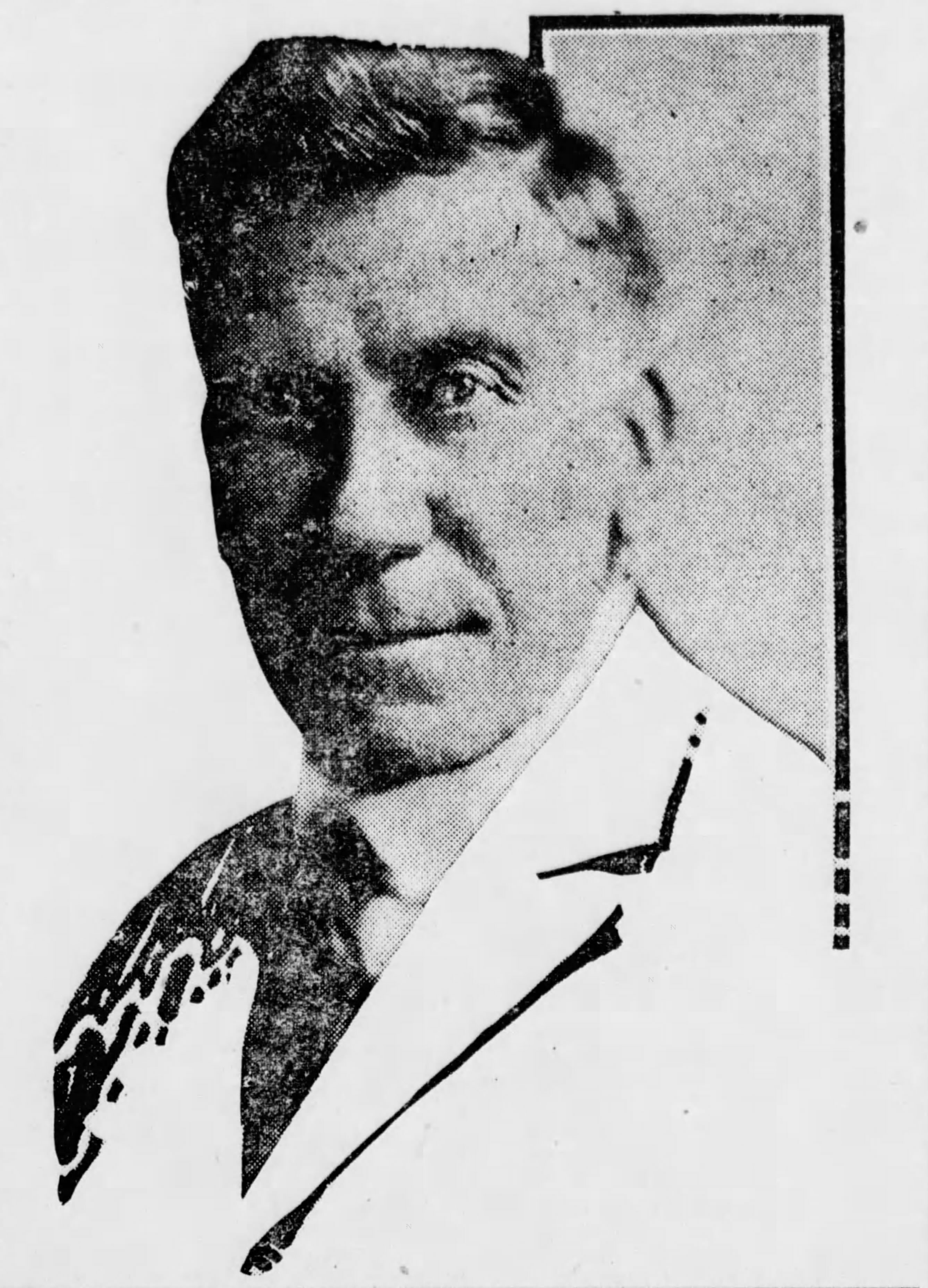

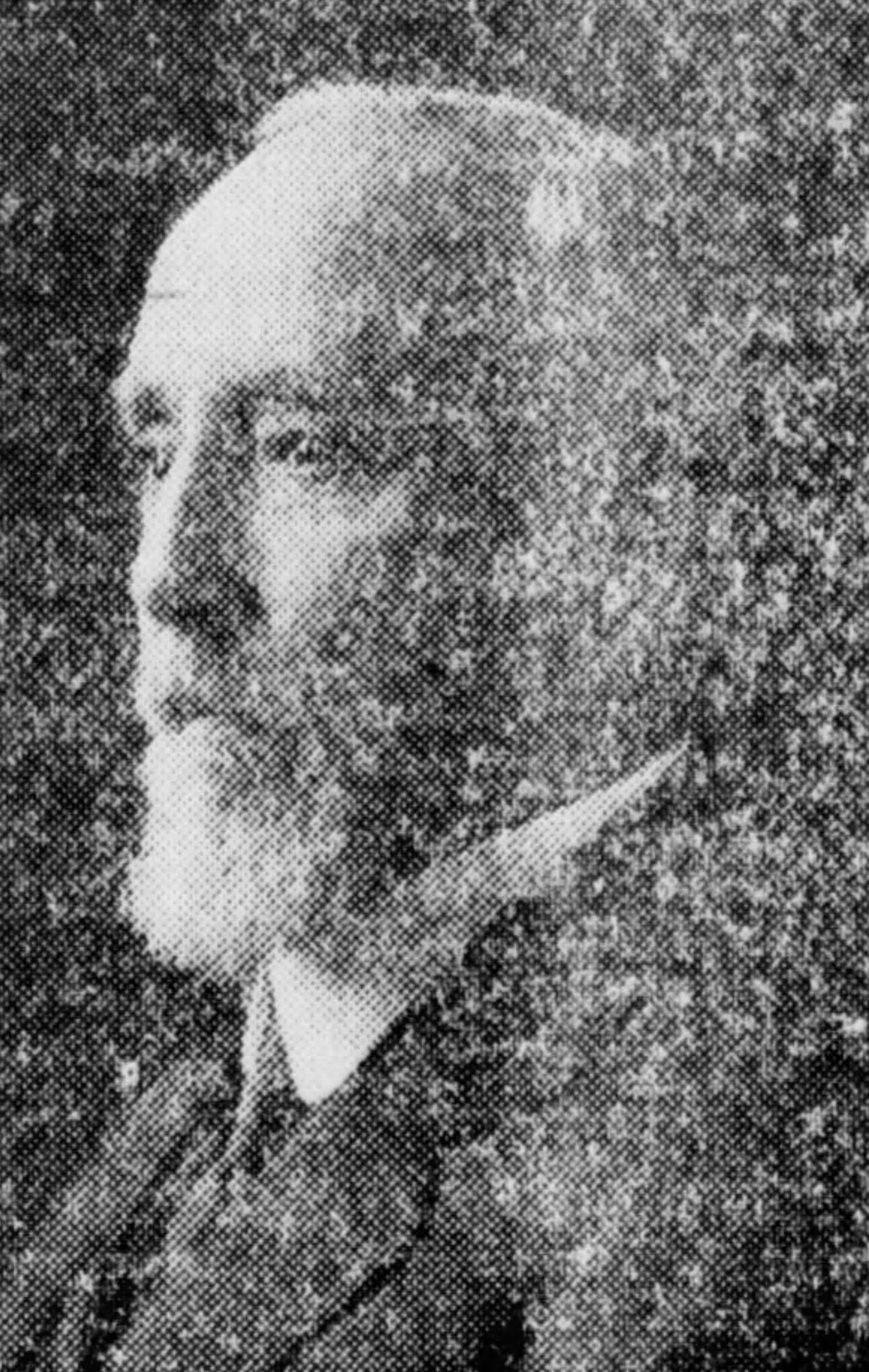
Nominee	Louis F. Hart	Robert Bridges	William Wilson Black
Party	Republican	Farmer–Labor	Democratic
Popular vote	210,662	121,371	66,079
Percentage	52.74%	30.39%	16.54%
- County results Hart: 30–40% 40–50% 50–60% 60–70% Bridges: 40–50%
Governor before election
Louis F. Hart
Republican
Elected Governor
Louis F. Hart
Republican

The 1920 Washington gubernatorial election was held on November 2, 1920. Incumbent Republican Louis F. Hart defeated Farmer–Labor nominee Robert Bridges with 52.74% of the vote.

== Primary election ==
Primary elections were held on September 9, 1920. Washington abandoned its form of ranked choice voting in primary elections after 1916, switching to the traditional first-past-the-post voting for primaries starting in 1918.

=== Republican party ===
==== Candidates ====
- Louis F. Hart, incumbent Governor
- Roland H. Hartley, former State Representative
- George B. Lamping, State Senator
- Edwin T. Coman
- John Arthur Gellatly, State Senator
- John Stringer
- Anna MacEachern

==== Results ====
Republican primary results
Party	Candidate	Votes	%
Republican	Louis F. Hart (incumbent)	64,751	31.60%
Republican	Roland H. Hartley	56,219	27.44%
Republican	George B. Lamping	35,857	17.50%
Republican	Edwin T. Coman	20,438	9.97%
Republican	John A. Gellatly	19,612	9.57%
Republican	John Stringer	4,688	2.29%
Republican	Anna MacEachern	3,332	1.63%
Total votes		204,897	100.00%

=== Democratic party ===
==== Candidates ====
- William Wilson Black
- Edward T. Mathes
- A. E. Judd
- I. G. O'Harra

==== Results ====
Democratic primary results
Party	Candidate	Votes	%
Democratic	William Wilson Black	9,735	42.79%
Democratic	Edward T. Mathes	6,061	26.64%
Democratic	A. E. Judd	4,542	19.96%
Democratic	I. G. O'Harra	2,414	10.61%
Total votes		22,752	100.00%

== General election ==
=== Candidates ===
Major party candidates

- Louis F. Hart, Republican
- William Wilson Black, Democratic

Other candidates

- Robert Bridges, Farmer–Labor
- David Burgess, Socialist Labor

=== Results ===
1920 Washington gubernatorial election
Party	Candidate	Votes	%	±%
Republican	Louis F. Hart (incumbent)	210,662	52.74%	+8.30%
Farmer–Labor	Robert Bridges	121,371	30.39%	
Democratic	William Wilson Black	66,079	16.54%	−31.56%
Socialist Labor	David Burgess	1,296	0.32%	+0.16%
Majority		89,291	22.36%	
Total votes		399,408	100.00%	
Republican hold		Swing	+26.02%	

=== Results by county ===
County	Louis F. Hart Republican		Robert Bridges Farmer-Labor		W. W. Black Democratic		David Burgess Socialist Labor		Margin		Total votes cast
County	#	%	#	%	#	%	#	%	#	%	Total votes cast
Adams	1,418	63.22%	403	17.97%	413	18.41%	9	0.40%	1,005 (Note: Hart's margin over Black)	44.81%	2,243
Asotin	1.283	69.28%	139	7.51%	421	22.73%	9	0.49%	862	46.54%	1,852
Benton	1,956	50.82%	1,395	36.24%	493	12.81%	5	0.13%	561	14.58%	3,849
Chelan	3,736	56.39%	1,508	22.76%	1,369	20.66%	12	0.18%	2,228	33.63%	6,625
Clallam	1,648	47.48%	1,380	39.76%	429	12.36%	14	0.40%	268	7.72%	3,471
Clark	4,591	50.81%	2,650	29.33%	1,768	19.57%	27	0.30%	1,941	21.48%	9,036
Columbia	1,501	69.49%	226	10.46%	428	19.81%	5	0.23%	1,073	49.68%	2,160
Cowlitz	2,239	61.36%	865	23.71%	538	14.74%	7	0.19%	1,374	37.65%	3,649
Douglas	1,492	54.99%	328	12.09%	886	32.66%	7	0.26%	606	22.34%	2,713
Ferry	511	37.68%	402	29.65%	437	32.23%	6	0.44%	74	5.46%	1,356
Franklin	771	40.37%	784	41.05%	350	18.32%	5	0.26%	-13	-0.68%	1,910
Garfield	845	64.60%	186	14.22%	274	20.95%	3	0.23%	571	43.65%	1,308
Grant	1,234	51.83%	454	19.07%	689	28.94%	4	0.17%	545	22.89%	2,381
Grays Harbor	6,475	54.65%	3,619	30.55%	1,735	14.64%	19	0.16%	2,856	24.11%	11,848
Island	824	47.30%	663	38.06%	254	14.58%	1	0.06%	161	9.24%	1,742
Jefferson	1,063	57.65%	498	27.01%	278	15.08%	5	0.27%	565	30.64%	1,844
King	53,081	49.19%	39,034	36.17%	15,292	14.17%	500	0.46%	14,047	13.02%	107,907
Kitsap	4,287	42.35%	4,838	47.79%	981	9.69%	17	0.17%	-551	-5.44%	10,123
Kittitas	2,820	52.27%	1,846	34.22%	716	13.27%	13	0.24%	974	18.05%	5,395
Klickitat	1,633	58.36%	672	24.02%	487	17.41%	6	0.21%	961	34.35%	2,798
Lewis	6,342	56.28%	3,670	32.57%	1,245	11.05%	12	0.11%	2,672	23.71%	11,269
Lincoln	2,787	60.21%	325	7.02%	1,507	32.56%	10	0.22%	1,280	27.65%	4,629
Mason	926	52.17%	550	30.99%	294	16.56%	5	0.28%	376	21.18%	1,775
Okanogan	2,789	55.08%	1,263	24.94%	990	19.55%	22	0.43%	1,526	30.13%	5,064
Pacific	2,647	67.29%	710	18.05%	562	14.29%	15	0.38%	1,937	49.24%	3,934
Pend Oreille	1,065	54.36%	361	18.43%	523	26.70%	10	0.51%	542	27.67%	1,959
Pierce	21,440	50.39%	15,442	36.29%	5,528	12.99%	142	0.33%	5,998	14.10%	42,552
San Juan	800	64.78%	285	23.08%	145	11.74%	5	0.40%	515	41.70%	1,235
Skagit	4,925	46.70%	4,124	39.10%	1,476	13.99%	22	0.21%	801	7.59%	10,547
Skamania	421	55.39%	193	25.39%	141	18.55%	5	0.66%	228	30.00%	760
Snohomish	9,383	45.37%	7,915	38.27%	3,353	16.21%	31	0.15%	1,468	7.10%	20,682
Spokane	24,328	56.86%	6,890	16.10%	11,391	26.62%	176	0.41%	12,937	30.24%	42,785
Stevens	2,985	51.02%	1,490	25.47%	1,353	23.12%	23	0.39%	1,495	25.55%	5,851
Thurston	3,994	53.37%	2,617	34.97%	851	11.37%	22	0.29%	1,377	18.40%	7,484
Wahkiakum	492	60.82%	192	23.73%	108	13.35%	17	2.10%	300	37.08%	809
Walla Walla	5,986	68.74%	881	10.12%	1,818	20.88%	23	0.26%	4,168	47.86%	8,708
Whatcom	8,209	51.73%	6,022	37.95%	1,609	10.14%	30	0.19%	2,187	13.78%	15,870
Whitman	6,499	66.55%	899	9.21%	2,352	24.08%	16	0.16%	4,147	42.46%	9,766
Yakima	11,236	57.56%	5,652	28.96%	2,595	13.29%	36	0.18%	5,584	28.61%	19,519
Totals	210,662	52.74%	121,371	30.39%	66,079	16.54%	1,296	0.32%	89,291	22.39%	399,408

==== Counties that flipped from Democratic to Republican ====
- Adams
- Asotin
- Benton
- Chelan
- Columbia
- Douglas
- Ferry
- Garfield
- Grant
- Grays Harbor
- Island
- King
- Kittitas
- Klickitat
- Lewis
- Lincoln
- Mason
- Okanogan
- Pend Oreille
- Pierce
- Skagit
- Snohomish
- Spokane
- Stevens
- Walla Walla
- Whitman
- Yakima

==== Counties that flipped from Democratic to Farmer-Labor ====
- Franklin

==== Counties that flipped from Republican to Farmer-Labor ====
- Kitsap
