= 1933 United States elections =

- ← 1931 1932 1933 1934 1935 →

1933 United States elections included:

- Mayoral elections
  - 1933 Boston mayoral election
  - 1933 Cleveland mayoral election
  - 1933 Los Angeles mayoral election
  - 1933 Manchester, New Hampshire mayoral election
  - 1933 New York City mayoral election
  - 1933 Pittsburgh mayoral election
- Council, aldermanic and borough elections
  - 1933 Chicago aldermanic election
  - 1933 New York City aldermanic election
  - 1933 New York City aldermanic presidential election
  - 1933 New York City borough president elections

== See also ==
- 1933 United States House of Representatives elections
- 1933 United States Senate elections
- 1933 United States gubernatorial elections
