= 1935 New York City aldermanic election =

- November 5, 1935

All 65 seats to the New York City Board of Aldermen 33 seats needed for a majority
	Majority party	Minority party
Party	Democratic	Republican
Seats before	49	16
Seats won	62	3
Seat change	▲13	▼13

Elections were held to fill the 65 seats of the New York City Board of Aldermen on November 5, 1935. They would be the final elections to the Board of Aldermen, which would be abolished in 1937 in favor of the New York City Council, which was elected via borough-based proportional representation (single transferable voting).

Democrats gained 13 seats compared to the 1933 result. They recovered from Republican-Fusion advances in 1933. Republicans received only three seats, two in Manhattan and one in Brooklyn, despite receiving substantial votes across the city. Democrats won 95 percent of the seats on the Board of Aldermen with only 67 percent of the vote. Such a disproportionate result led to electoral reform. Thomas J. Curran of Manhattan was chosen as the minority leader.
