= 1928 Washington gubernatorial election =

- November 6, 1928
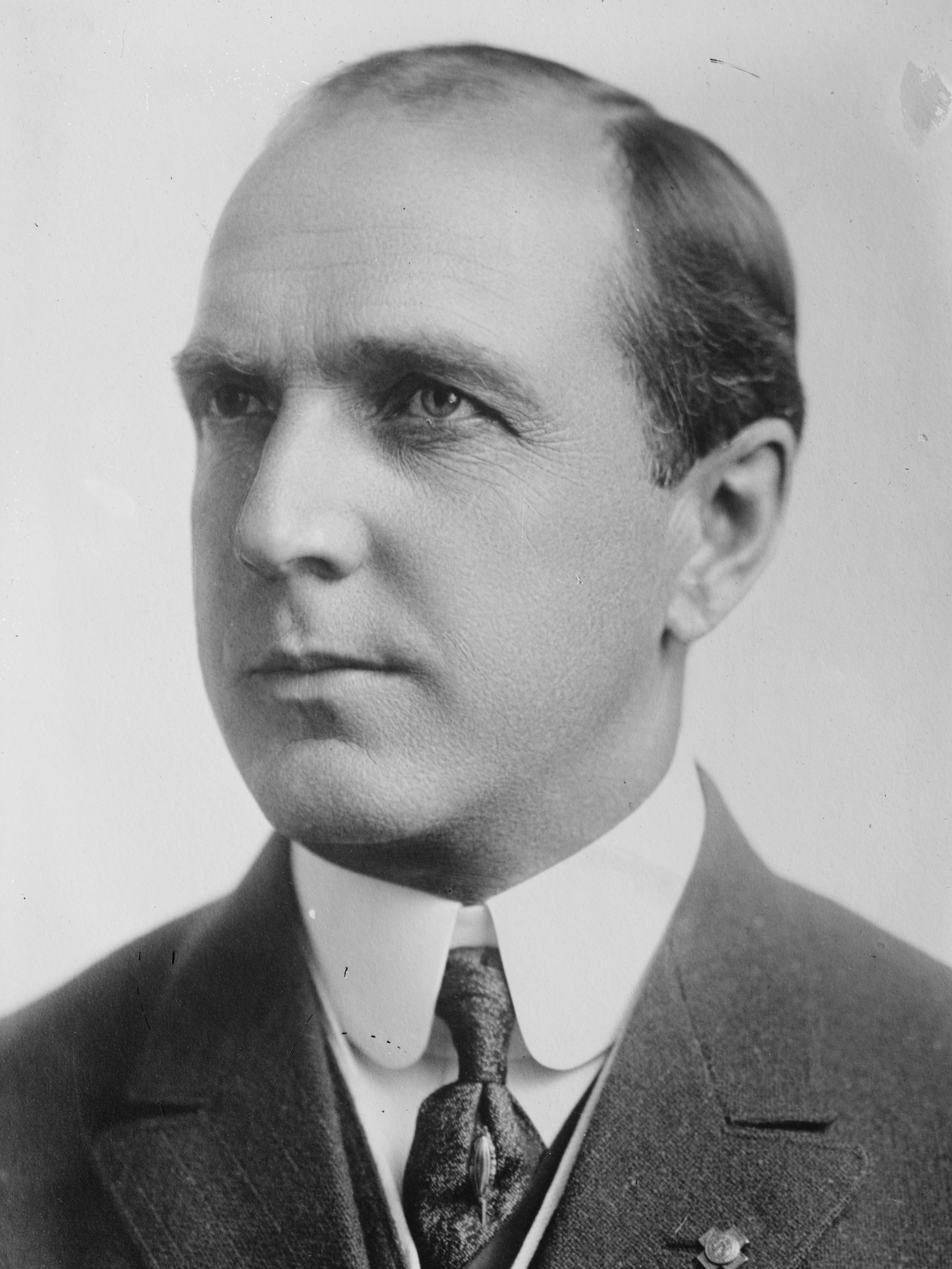

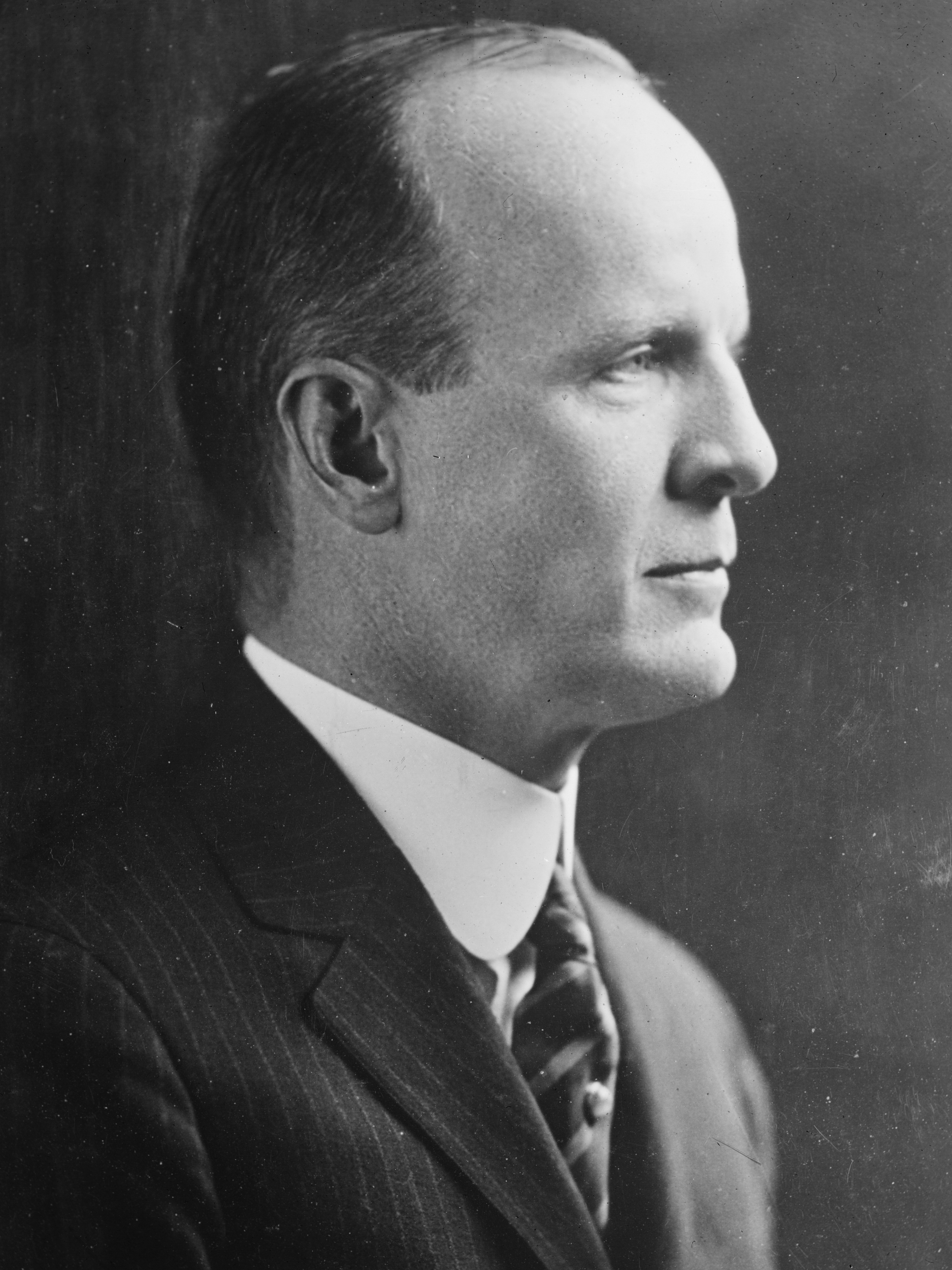
Nominee	Roland H. Hartley	Scott Bullitt
Party	Republican	Democratic
Popular vote	281,991	214,334
Percentage	56.21%	42.73%
- County results Hartley: 50–60% 60–70% 70–80% Bullitt: 50–60% 60–70%
Governor before election
Roland H. Hartley
Republican
Elected Governor
Roland H. Hartley
Republican

The 1928 Washington gubernatorial election was held on November 6, 1928. Incumbent Republican Roland H. Hartley defeated Democratic nominee A. Scott Bullitt with 56.22% of the vote. This was the last gubernatorial election until 1980 in which a Republican carried Franklin County, Mason County, and Pierce County.

== Primary election ==
Primary elections were held on September 11, 1928.

=== Republican party ===
==== Candidates ====
- Roland H. Hartley, incumbent governor
- E. L. French
- Claude G. Bannick

==== Results ====
Republican primary results
Party	Candidate	Votes	%
Republican	Roland H. Hartley (incumbent)	143,505	51.04%
Republican	E. L. French	124,312	44.21%
Republican	Claude G. Bannick	13,346	4.75%
Total votes		281,163	100.00%

=== Democratic party ===
==== Candidates ====
- Scott Bullitt, attorney from Seattle
- Stephen James Chadwick, former Associate Justice of the Washington Supreme Court
- C. L. McKenzie
- George F. Cotterill, former mayor of Seattle

==== Results ====
Democratic primary results
Party	Candidate	Votes	%
Democratic	Scott Bullitt	20,239	51.76%
Democratic	Stephen James Chadwick	13,804	35.30%
Democratic	C. L. McKenzie	2,967	7.59%
Democratic	George F. Cotterill	2,092	5.35%
Total votes		39,102	100.00%

== General election ==
=== Candidates ===
Major party candidates

- Roland H. Hartley, Republican
- Scott Bullitt, Democratic

Other candidates

- James F. Stark, Socialist Labor
- Walter Price, Socialist
- Aaron Fyslerman, Workers

=== Results ===
1928 Washington gubernatorial election
Party	Candidate	Votes	%	±%
Republican	Roland H. Hartley (incumbent)	281,991	56.22%	−0.19%
Democratic	Scott Bullitt	214,334	42.73%	+10.33%
Socialist Labor	James F. Stark	3,343	0.67%	+0.47%
Socialist	Walter Price	1,262	0.25%	+0.02%
Workers	Aaron Fyslerman	698	0.14%	
Majority		67,657	13.49%	
Total votes		501,648	100.00	
Republican hold		Swing	-10.52%	

=== Results by county ===
County	Roland H. Hartley Republican		Scott Bullitt Democratic		James F. Stark Socialist Labor		Walter Price Socialist		Aaron Fyslerman Workers		Margin		Total votes cast
County	#	%	#	%	#	%	#	%	#	%	#	%	Total votes cast
Adams	1,235	54.36%	1,031	45.38%	4	0.18%	1	0.04%	1	0.04%	204	8.98%	2,272
Asotin	1,835	69.56%	797	30.21%	4	0.15%	1	0.04%	1	0.04%	1,038	39.35%	2,638
Benton	2,393	63.32%	1,354	35.83%	9	0.24%	19	0.50%	4	0.11%	1,039	27.49%	3,779
Chelan	5,503	55.28%	4,419	44.39%	16	0.16%	14	0.14%	2	0.02%	1,084	10.89%	9,954
Clallam	2,752	53.13%	2,411	46.54%	6	0.12%	7	0.14%	4	0.08%	341	6.58%	5,180
Clark	6,235	50.38%	6,024	48.67%	48	0.39%	45	0.36%	24	0.19%	211	1.70%	12,376
Columbia	1,437	68.82%	644	30.84%	1	0.05%	5	0.24%	1	0.05%	793	37.98%	2,088
Cowlitz	4,024	46.43%	4,588	52.94%	8	0.09%	24	0.28%	22	0.25%	-564	-6.51%	8,666
Douglas	1,410	52.42%	1,262	46.91%	7	0.26%	10	0.37%	1	0.04%	148	5.50%	2,690
Ferry	735	51.54%	677	47.48%	6	0.42%	7	0.49%	1	0.07%	58	4.07%	1,426
Franklin	1,237	57.91%	883	41.34%	6	0.28%	8	0.37%	2	0.09%	354	16.57%	2,136
Garfield	1,008	70.54%	421	29.46%	0	0.00%	0	0.00%	0	0.00%	587	41.08%	1,429
Grant	1,265	60.64%	810	38.83%	2	0.10%	8	0.38%	1	0.05%	455	21.81%	2,086
Grays Harbor	6,952	42.26%	9,352	56.85%	29	0.18%	50	0.30%	67	0.41%	-2,400	-14.59%	16,450
Island	1,214	56.62%	902	42.07%	4	0.19%	17	0.79%	7	0.33%	312	14.55%	2,144
Jefferson	1,242	53.70%	1,060	45.83%	4	0.17%	4	0.17%	3	0.13%	182	7.87%	2,313
King	78,626	53.49%	65,686	44.68%	2,080	1.41%	367	0.25%	242	0.16%	12,940	8.80%	147,001
Kitsap	5,333	51.10%	5,003	47.94%	43	0.41%	35	0.34%	23	0.22%	330	3.16%	10,437
Kittitas	1,971	36.26%	3,425	63.02%	6	0.11%	18	0.33%	15	0.28%	-1,454	-26.75%	5,435
Klickitat	1,906	63.15%	1,083	35.88%	5	0.17%	20	0.66%	4	0.13%	823	27.27%	3,018
Lewis	6,289	48.04%	6,726	51.38%	21	0.16%	26	0.20%	29	0.22%	-437	-3.34%	13,091
Lincoln	2,795	61.27%	1,754	38.45%	7	0.15%	4	0.09%	2	0.04%	1,041	22.82%	4,562
Mason	1,424	50.78%	1,363	48.61%	7	0.25%	9	0.32%	1	0.04%	61	2.18%	2,804
Okanogan	2,706	53.22%	2,361	46.43%	9	0.18%	8	0.16%	1	0.02%	345	6.78%	5,085
Pacific	2,808	57.27%	2,067	42.16%	5	0.10%	3	0.06%	20	0.41%	741	15.11%	4,903
Pend Oreille	1,403	69.42%	606	29.99%	3	0.15%	8	0.40%	1	0.05%	797	39.44%	2,021
Pierce	33,347	61.31%	20,588	37.85%	262	0.48%	120	0.22%	70	0.13%	12,759	23.46%	54,387
San Juan	649	54.08%	546	45.50%	1	0.08%	3	0.25%	1	0.08%	103	8.58%	1,200
Skagit	6,389	55.80%	4,971	43.41%	31	0.27%	22	0.19%	37	0.32%	1,418	12.38%	11,450
Skamania	652	58.79%	439	39.59%	1	0.09%	12	1.08%	5	0.45%	213	19.21%	1,109
Snohomish	13,559	55.40%	10,550	43.11%	259	1.06%	83	0.34%	22	0.09%	3,009	12.30%	24,473
Spokane	33,441	61.56%	20,614	37.95%	135	0.25%	94	0.17%	36	0.07%	12,827	23.61%	54,320
Stevens	4,350	71.84%	1,668	27.55%	8	0.13%	16	0.26%	13	0.21%	2,682	44.29%	6,055
Thurston	5,938	56.96%	4,433	42.53%	13	0.12%	33	0.32%	7	0.07%	1,505	14.44%	10,424
Wahkiakum	668	69.66%	279	29.09%	5	0.52%	7	0.73%	0	0.00%	389	40.56%	959
Walla Walla	5,716	58.47%	4,047	41.40%	8	0.08%	4	0.04%	1	0.01%	1,669	17.07%	9,776
Whatcom	12,107	64.01%	6,535	34.55%	190	1.00%	65	0.34%	17	0.09%	5,572	29.46%	18,914
Whitman	7,127	70.70%	2,921	28.98%	15	0.15%	16	0.16%	1	0.01%	4,206	41.73%	10,080
Yakima	12,310	54.67%	10,034	44.56%	95	0.42%	69	0.31%	9	0.04%	2,276	10.11%	22,517
Totals	281,991	56.21%	214,334	42.73%	3,363	0.67%	1,262	0.25%	698	0.14%	67,657	13.49%	501,648

==== Counties that flipped from Democratic to Republican ====
- Adams
- Douglas
- Ferry
- Franklin

==== Counties that flipped from Republican to Democratic ====
- Cowlitz
- Grays Harbor
- Kittitas
- Lewis
