= 1936 Washington gubernatorial election =

- November 3, 1936
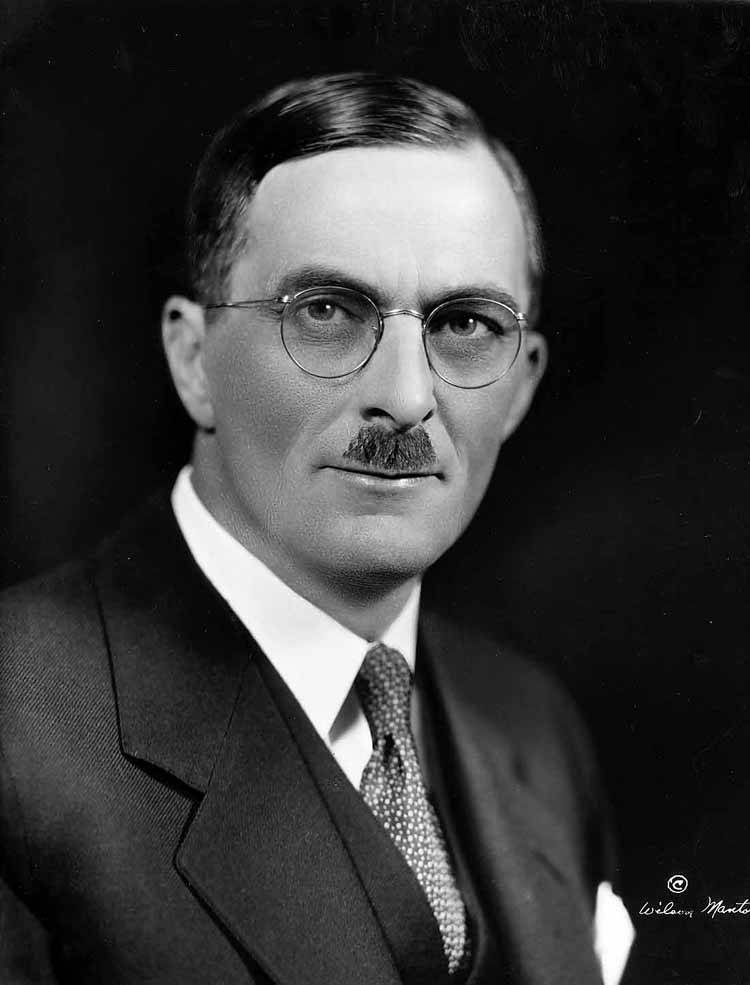

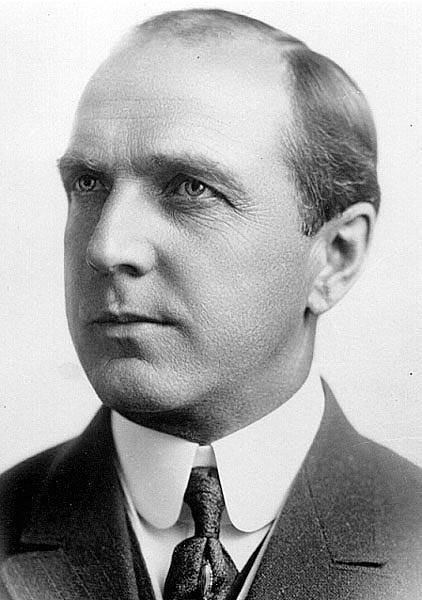
Nominee	Clarence D. Martin	Roland H. Hartley
Party	Democratic	Republican
Popular vote	466,550	189,141
Percentage	69.36%	28.12%
- County results Martin: 50–60% 60–70% 70–80% 80–90%
Governor before election
Clarence D. Martin
Democratic
Elected Governor
Clarence D. Martin
Democratic

The 1936 Washington gubernatorial election was held on November 3, 1936. Incumbent Democrat Clarence D. Martin defeated Republican nominee Roland H. Hartley with 69.36% of the vote.

Martin's popular vote share is the largest achieved by any gubernatorial candidate in Washington. This is the most recent gubernatorial election in which a candidate swept every county in the state. As of 2020, this is also the most recent election in which a Democrat has carried Adams County and Columbia County. Additionally, Chelan County, Garfield County, Lincoln County, San Juan County, Walla Walla County, and Whitman County would not vote Democratic again until 1988.

== Primary election ==
The primary election was held on September 8, 1936. Washington adopted a blanket primary starting with the 1936 elections. All candidates appeared on the same ballot, with the highest candidate for each party becoming that party's nominee. This system was eventually ruled unconstitutional in the early 2000s.

=== Candidates ===
- Erle J. Barnes (R)
- James W. Bryan (R)
- Otto A. Case (D), Washington State Treasurer
- Frank W. Harris (R)
- Roland H. Hartley (R), former Governor
- Ralph Horr (R), former U.S. Representative
- A. E. Judd (D)
- Eugene J. A. Lord (D)
- Clarence D. Martin (D), incumbent Governor
- Walter F. Meier (R)
- John Calvin Richards (R)
- Roscoe A. Seeds (D)
- H. G. Stevenson (D)
- John C. Stevenson (D), radio announcer and candidate for U.S. Senate in 1934

=== Results ===
Blanket primary results
Party	Candidate	Votes	%
Democratic	Clarence D. Martin (incumbent)	166,313	33.05%
Democratic	John C. Stevenson	129,388	25.71%
Democratic	Otto A. Case	86,752	17.24%
Republican	Roland H. Hartley	59,371	11.80%
Republican	Walter F. Meier	23,892	4.75%
Democratic	H. G. Stevenson	13,556	2.69%
Republican	Ralph Horr	13,023	2.59%
Democratic	A. E. Judd	3,582	0.71%
Democratic	Eugene J. A. Lord	2,356	0.47%
Republican	John Calvin Richards	1,588	0.32%
Republican	Erle J. Barnes	1,052	0.21%
Republican	Frank W. Harris	888	0.18%
Democratic	Roscoe A. Seeds	752	0.15%
Democratic	James W. Bryan	684	0.14%
Total votes		503,197	100.00%

== General election ==
=== Candidates ===
Major party candidates

- Clarence D. Martin, Democratic
- Roland H. Hartley, Republican

Other candidates

- Ove M. Nelson, Union
- John F. McKay, Socialist
- William Morley Bouck, Farmer–Labor
- Malcolm M. Moore, Christian
- Harold P. Brockway, Communist
- Eugene V. Solie, Socialist Labor

=== Results ===
1936 Washington gubernatorial election
Party	Candidate	Votes	%	±%
Democratic	Clarence D. Martin (incumbent)	466,550	69.36%	+12.07%
Republican	Roland H. Hartley	189,141	28.12%	−5.63%
Union	Ove M. Nelson	6,349	0.94%	
Socialist	John F. McKay	4,221	0.63%	−1.00%
Farmer–Labor	William Morley Bouck	1,994	0.30%	
Christian	Malcolm M. Moore	1,947	0.29%	
Communist	Harold P. Brockway	1,939	0.29%	−0.12%
Socialist Labor	Eugene V. Solie	466	0.07%	+0.00%
Majority		277,409	41.24%	
Total votes		672,607	100.00%	
Democratic hold		Swing	+17.70%	

=== Results by county ===
County	Clarence D. Martin Democratic		Roland H. Hartley Republican		Ove M. Nelson Union		John F. McKay Socialist		All Others Various		Margin		Total votes cast
County	#	%	#	%	#	%	#	%	#	%	#	%	Total votes cast
Adams	2,008	76.18%	611	23.18%	8	0.30%	4	0.15%	5	0.19%	1,397	53.00%	2,636
Asotin	2,178	66.30%	1,009	30.72%	74	2.25%	15	0.46%	9	0.27%	1,169	35.59%	3,285
Benton	2,470	56.82%	1,716	39.48%	131	3.01%	13	0.30%	17	0.39%	754	17.35%	4,347
Chelan	8,624	65.21%	4,441	33.58%	70	0.53%	29	0.22%	60	0.45%	4,183	31.63%	13,224
Clallam	5,521	66.95%	2,335	28.32%	289	3.50%	18	0.22%	83	1.01%	3,186	38.64%	8,246
Clark	13,360	74.93%	3,950	22.15%	273	1.53%	128	0.72%	120	0.67%	9,410	52.77%	17,831
Columbia	1,267	54.26%	970	41.54%	79	3.38%	7	0.30%	12	0.51%	297	12.72%	2,335
Cowlitz	10,393	75.21%	2,995	21.67%	224	1.62%	105	0.76%	101	0.73%	7,398	53.54%	13,818
Douglas	2,303	68.62%	988	29.44%	28	0.83%	25	0.74%	12	0.36%	1,315	39.18%	3,356
Ferry	1,090	73.60%	366	24.71%	13	0.88%	10	0.68%	2	0.14%	724	48.89%	1,481
Franklin	1,780	70.08%	670	26.38%	54	2.13%	15	0.59%	21	0.83%	1,110	43.70%	2,540
Garfield	926	57.48%	674	41.84%	10	0.62%	0	0.00%	1	0.06%	252	15.64%	1,611
Grant	4,158	84.12%	735	14.87%	16	0.32%	22	0.45%	12	0.24%	3,423	69.25%	4,943
Grays Harbor	17,053	81.08%	3,430	16.31%	368	1.75%	51	0.24%	130	0.62%	13,623	64.77%	21,032
Island	1,814	66.40%	798	29.21%	36	1.32%	14	0.51%	70	2.56%	1,016	37.19%	2,732
Jefferson	2,307	68.42%	1,013	30.04%	18	0.53%	10	0.30%	24	0.71%	1,294	38.37%	3,372
King	135,740	66.75%	63,857	31.40%	659	0.32%	1,350	0.66%	1,746	0.86%	71,883	35.35%	203,352
Kitsap	12,389	76.96%	3,255	20.22%	105	0.65%	41	0.25%	308	1.91%	9,134	56.74%	16,098
Kittitas	4,654	65.84%	2,314	32.73%	66	0.93%	25	0.35%	10	0.14%	2,340	33.10%	7,069
Klickitat	2,613	69.94%	1,043	27.92%	48	1.28%	9	0.24%	23	0.62%	1,570	42.02%	3,736
Lewis	10,663	65.45%	4,957	30.43%	298	1.83%	57	0.35%	317	1.95%	5,706	35.02%	16,292
Lincoln	3,582	71.80%	1,355	27.16%	25	0.50%	11	0.22%	16	0.32%	2,227	44.64%	4,989
Mason	3,110	73.25%	925	21.79%	129	3.04%	19	0.45%	63	1.48%	2,185	51.46%	4,246
Okanogan	5,447	65.05%	2,598	31.02%	272	3.25%	20	0.24%	37	0.44%	2,849	34.02%	8,374
Pacific	4,466	71.71%	1,607	25.80%	55	0.88%	13	0.21%	87	1.40%	2,859	45.91%	6,228
Pend Oreille	1,718	63.00%	941	34.51%	20	0.73%	22	0.81%	26	0.95%	777	28.49%	2,727
Pierce	51,299	76.32%	13,853	20.61%	557	0.83%	334	0.50%	1,170	1.74%	37,446	55.71%	67,213
San Juan	856	55.19%	623	40.17%	54	3.48%	3	0.19%	15	0.97%	233	15.02%	1,551
Skagit	10,313	67.15%	4,669	30.40%	127	0.83%	24	0.16%	225	1.47%	5,644	36.75%	15,358
Skamania	1,649	75.92%	493	22.70%	12	0.55%	9	0.41%	9	0.41%	1,156	53.22%	2,172
Snohomish	25,499	73.56%	8,143	23.49%	269	0.78%	251	0.72%	503	1.45%	17,356	50.07%	34,665
Spokane	48,823	70.95%	17,939	26.07%	476	0.69%	973	1.41%	605	0.88%	30,884	44.88%	68,816
Stevens	4,543	66.42%	2,101	30.72%	87	1.27%	70	1.02%	39	0.57%	2,442	35.70%	6,840
Thurston	11,629	75.56%	3,333	21.66%	227	1.47%	62	0.40%	140	0.91%	8,296	53.90%	15,391
Wahkiakum	1,083	70.32%	425	27.60%	22	1.43%	4	0.26%	6	0.39%	658	42.73%	1,540
Walla Walla	6,388	55.86%	4,723	41.30%	277	2.42%	26	0.23%	21	0.18%	1,665	14.56%	11,435
Whatcom	17,253	69.45%	6,968	28.05%	147	0.59%	299	1.20%	174	0.70%	10,285	41.40%	24,841
Whitman	7,794	66.23%	3,854	32.75%	58	0.49%	44	0.37%	18	0.15%	3,940	33.48%	11,768
Yakima	17,787	57.16%	12,464	40.06%	668	2.15%	89	0.29%	109	0.35%	5,323	17.11%	31,117
Totals	466,550	69.36%	189,141	28.12%	6,349	0.94%	4,221	0.63%	6,346	0.94%	277,409	41.24%	672,607

==== Counties that flipped from Republican to Democratic ====
- Chelan
- Skamania
