= 1934 United States elections =

- ← 1932 1933 1934 1935 1936 → Midterm elections
- Election day: November 6
- Incumbent president: ▌Franklin D. Roosevelt (D)
- Next Congress: 74th

Senate elections
- Overall control: Democratic hold
- Seats contested: 36 of 96 seats (32 Class 1 seats + 5 special elections)
- Net seat change: Democratic +9
- 1934 Senate election results Democratic gain Democratic hold Republican hold Progressive gain Farmer–Labor hold No election

House elections
- Overall control: Democratic hold
- Seats contested: All 435 voting seats
- Net seat change: Democratic +9
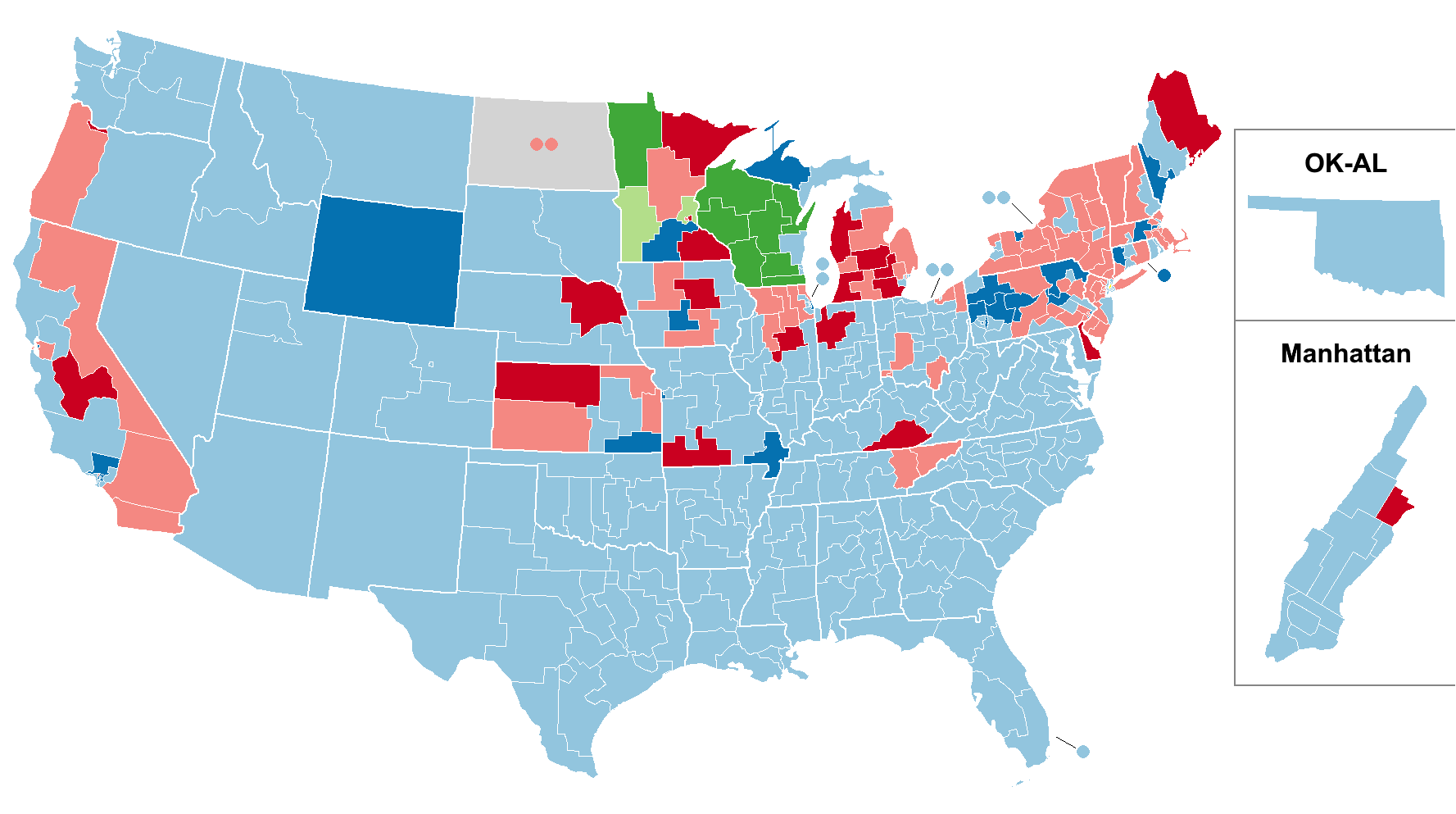
- 1934 House of Representatives election results Democratic gain Democratic hold Republican gain Republican hold Third party gain Third party hold

Gubernatorial elections
- Seats contested: 34
- Net seat change: Democratic +1
- 1934 gubernatorial election results Democratic gain Democratic hold Republican gain Republican hold Progressive gain Farmer–Labor hold

Elections were held on November 6, 1934. The election took place in the middle of Democratic President Franklin D. Roosevelt's first term, during the Great Depression. In a historic midterm election, the Democrats built on the majorities in both houses of Congress they had won in the previous two elections.

In the House of Representatives, Roosevelt's party gained nine seats, mostly from the Republican Party. The Democrats also gained nine seats in the U.S. Senate, thereby winning a supermajority. A Progressive also unseated a Republican in the Senate. This marked the first of three times that an incumbent president's party did not experience a net loss of seats in both houses of Congress in a midterm election, followed by 1998 and 2002. It is also the only one of the three where an incumbent president's party simultaneously did not experience a net loss of governorships. The feat of a Democratic president seeing net gains in the governorships in a midterm would not be observed again until 2022. This was also the last midterm until 2022 in which the president's party did not lose any state legislative chambers.

The election was perhaps the most successful midterm of the 20th century for the party in control of the presidency. Despite opposition from Republicans, business organizations such as the United States Chamber of Commerce, and disaffected Democrats who formed the American Liberty League, Roosevelt's New Deal policies were bolstered and his New Deal coalition was solidified. The election was critical in re-centering the Democratic Party in Northern, urban areas, as opposed to the party's traditional base in the South. Conservative Republicans also suffered major losses across the country. Future president Harry S. Truman won election as senator from Missouri during this election.

Also in 1934, Nebraska held a referendum on switching from a bicameral legislature, to a non-partisan unicameral one, which voters approved. With the referendum passing, it marked the first time in over 100 years that a state had a unicameral legislature, and Nebraska continues to be the only state with one.

== See also ==
- 1934 United States House of Representatives elections
- 1934 United States Senate elections
- 1934 United States gubernatorial elections
- Kelayres massacre
