= W. Lon Johnson =

9th Lieutenant Governor of Washington

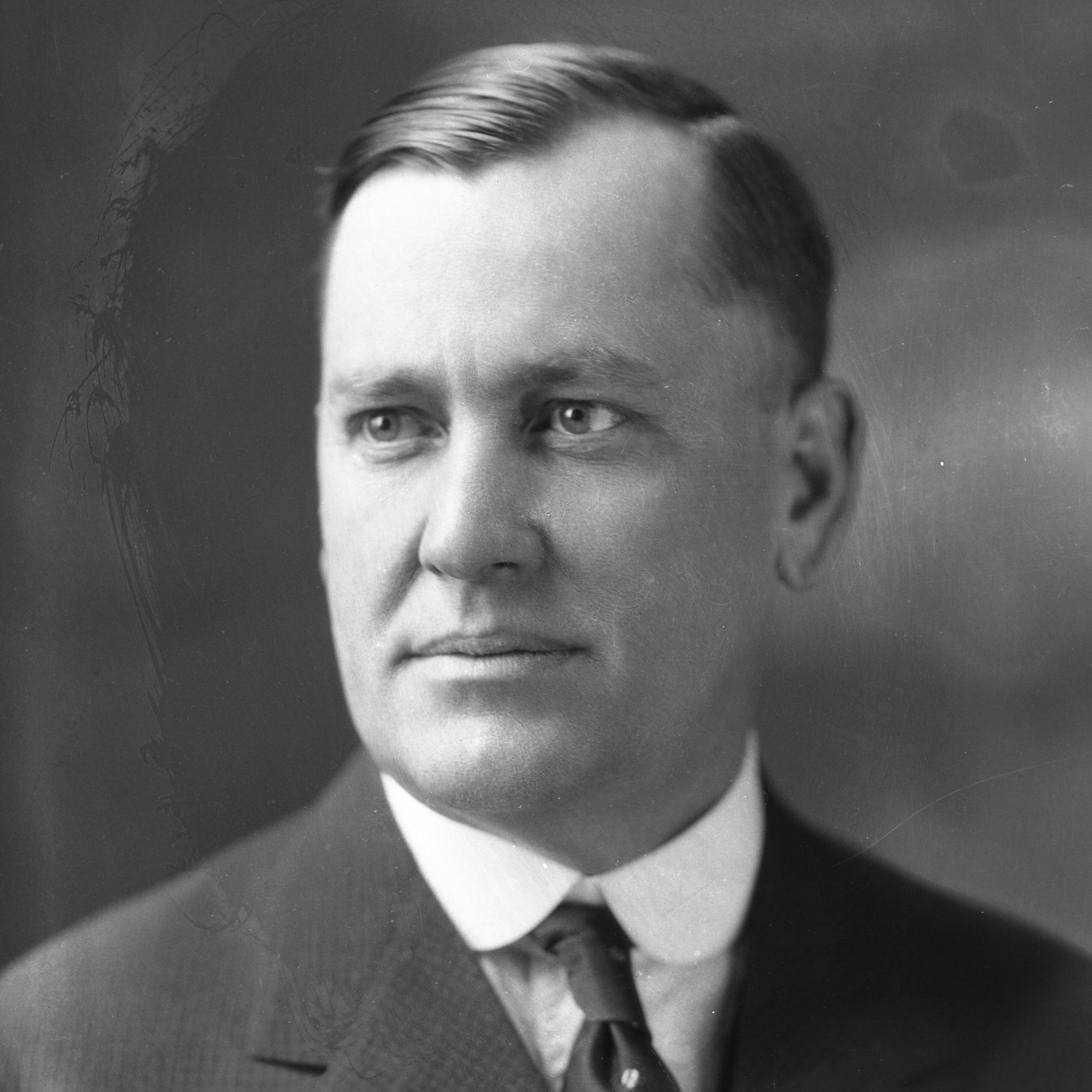
- Johnson c. 1923

9th Lieutenant Governor of Washington
- In office January 14, 1925 – January 16, 1929
- Governor: Roland H. Hartley
- Preceded by: William J. Coyle
- Succeeded by: John Arthur Gellatly

Personal details
- Born: November 11, 1882; Ozark Mountains, Missouri, U.S.
- Died: July 5, 1967 (aged 84); Colville, Washington, U.S.
- Political party: Republican

William Lon Johnson (November 11, 1882 – July 5, 1967) was a Republican politician from the U.S. state of Washington. Johnson was elected to the Washington State Senate from Stevens and Pend Oreille Counties, 1919–1924. He served as the ninth Lieutenant Governor of Washington for one term, and then was elected Superior Court Judge.

== Sources ==
- "Lieutenant Governors of the state of Washington". State of Washington. Archived from the original on December 19, 2012.

Political offices
Preceded by William J. Coyle	Lieutenant Governor of Washington; 1925–1929	Succeeded by John A. Gellatly
