= 1932 Estonian constitutional referendum =

| 13–15 August 1932 |

Results
| Choice | Votes | % |
|---|---|---|
| Yes | 333,979 | 49.17% |
| No | 345,212 | 50.83% |
| Valid votes | 679,191 | 98.11% |
| Invalid or blank votes | 13,111 | 1.89% |
| Total votes | 692,302 | 100.00% |
| Registered voters/turnout | 765,002 | 90.5% |

A constitutional referendum was held in Estonia between 13 and 15 August 1932. The new constitution proposed by Parliament was rejected by 50.8% of voters, with a turnout of 90.5%.

== Results ==
| Choice | Votes | % |
|---|---|---|
| For | 333,979 | 49.2 |
| Against | 345,212 | 50.8 |
| Invalid/blank votes | 13,111 | – |
| Total | 692,302 | 100 |
| Registered voters/turnout | 765,002 | 90.5 |
Source: Nohlen & Stöver
