= 1932 Texas lieutenant gubernatorial election =

- November 8, 1932

Nominee	Edgar E. Witt	James W. Bass
Party	Democratic	Republican
Popular vote	770,565	66,349
Percentage	91.81%	7.91%
Lieutenant Governor before election
Edgar E. Witt
Democratic
Elected Lieutenant Governor
Edgar E. Witt
Democratic

The 1932 Texas lieutenant gubernatorial election was held on November 8, 1932, in order to elect the lieutenant governor of Texas. Incumbent Democratic lieutenant governor Edgar E. Witt defeated Republican nominee James W. Bass.

== General election ==
On election day, November 8, 1932, incumbent Democratic lieutenant governor Edgar E. Witt won re-election by a margin of 704,216 votes against his opponent Republican nominee James W. Bass, thereby retaining Democratic control over the office of lieutenant governor. Witt was sworn in for his second term on January 17, 1933.

=== Results ===
Texas lieutenant gubernatorial election, 1932
Party	Candidate	Votes	%
Democratic	Edgar E. Witt (incumbent)	770,565	91.81
Republican	James W. Bass	66,349	7.91
	Scattering	2,399	0.28
Total votes		839,313	100.00
Democratic hold			
