= 1932 Washington gubernatorial election =

- November 8, 1932
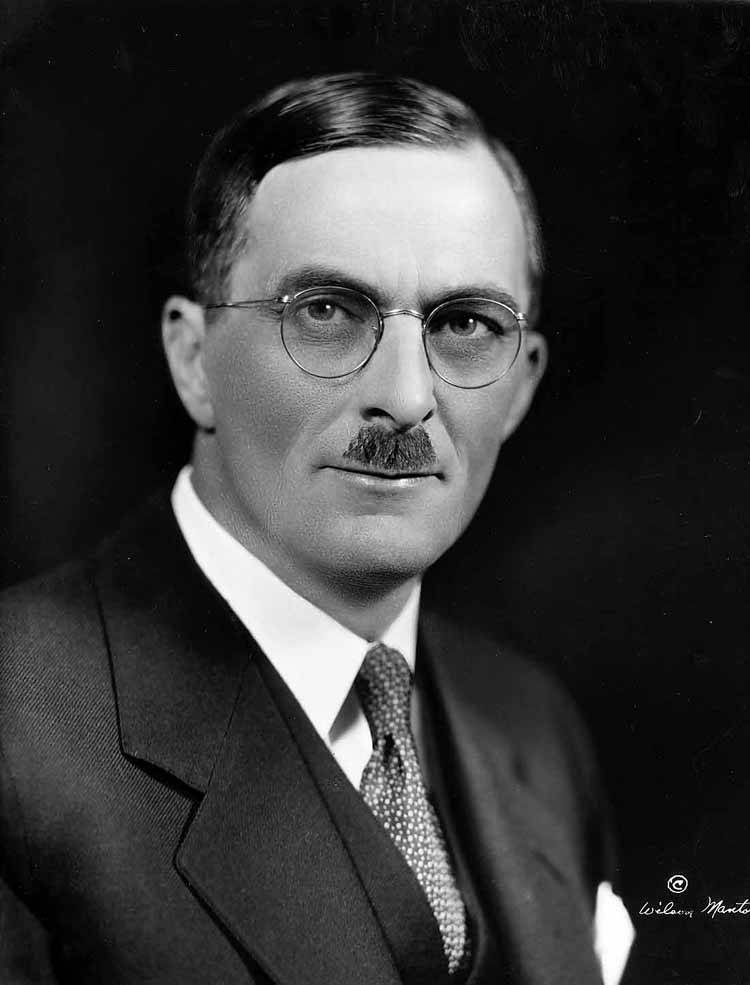

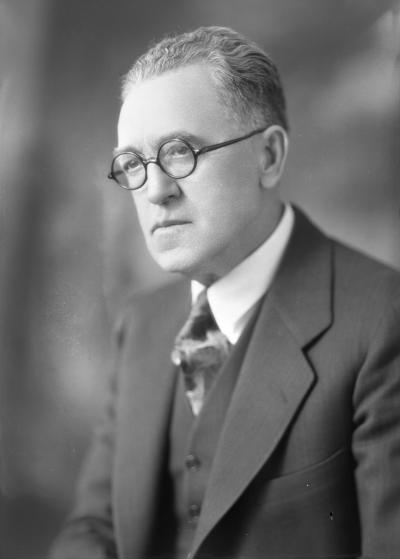

Nominee	Clarence D. Martin	John Arthur Gellatly	Luvern Clyde Hicks
Party	Democratic	Republican	Liberty
Popular vote	352,215	207,497	41,710
Percentage	57.29%	33.75%	6.78%
- County results Martin: 30–40% 40–50% 50–60% 60–70% 70–80% Gellatly: 40–50% 50–60%
Governor before election
Roland H. Hartley
Republican
Elected Governor
Clarence D. Martin
Democratic

The 1932 Washington gubernatorial election was held on November 8, 1932. Democratic nominee Clarence D. Martin defeated Republican nominee John Arthur Gellatly with 57.29% of the vote.

Martin was the first Democrat elected governor of Washington with an absolute majority. He was also the first Democratic gubernatorial candidate in Washington to ever win Pacific County and San Juan County and the first since 1892 to win Jefferson County. Additionally, Clallam County, Clark County, Kitsap County, Thurston County, Wahkiakum County, and Whatcom County voted Democratic for the first time since 1896. (Note: The Democratic nominee in 1896 was primarily the Populist nominee, the two parties having run a fusion ticket in that election.)

== Primary election ==
Primary elections were held on September 13, 1932.

=== Republican party ===
==== Candidates ====
- Glen S. Corkery
- John Arthur Gellatly, incumbent Lieutenant Governor
- Roland H. Hartley, incumbent Governor
- M. G. Tennent
- Dell W. Thomas

==== Results ====
Results by county Gellatly: 40–50%; 50–60%; 60–70%; 70–80%; Hartley: 40–50%; 50–60%; 70–80%

Republican primary results
Party	Candidate	Votes	%
Republican	John Arthur Gellatly	119,015	54.52%
Republican	Roland H. Hartley (incumbent)	68,718	31.48%
Republican	M. G. Tennent	18,393	8.43%
Republican	Dell W. Thomas	7,439	3.41%
Republican	Glen S. Corkery	4,723	2.16%
Total votes		218,288	100.00%

=== Democratic party ===
==== Candidates ====
- Clarence D. Martin, Mayor of Cheney
- Frank R. Nicholas
- William Harrison Pemberton, former Associate Justice of the Washington Supreme Court
- Lewis B. Schwellenbach, attorney

==== Results ====
Results by county Martin: 30–40%; 40–50%; 50–60%; 60–70%; 70–80%; 80–90%; Pemberton: 30–40%; 40–50%; 50–60%; Schwellenbach: 40–50%; 50–60%; Tie: 30–40%

Democratic primary results
Party	Candidate	Votes	%
Democratic	Clarence D. Martin	67,168	36.32%
Democratic	William Harrison Pemberton	57,124	30.89%
Democratic	Lewis B. Schwellenbach	55,094	29.79%
Democratic	Frank R. Nicholas	5,557	3.00%
Total votes		184,943	100.00%

== General election ==
=== Candidates ===
Major party candidates

- Clarence D. Martin, Democratic
- John Arthur Gellatly, Republican

Other candidates

- Luvern Clyde Hicks, Liberty
- John F. McKay, Socialist
- Fred E. Walker, Communist
- Edward Kriz, Socialist Labor
- Maslen Meade, Independent

=== Results ===
1932 Washington gubernatorial election
Party	Candidate	Votes	%	±%
Democratic	Clarence D. Martin	352,215	57.29%	+14.57%
Republican	John Arthur Gellatly	207,497	33.75%	−22.46%
Liberty	Luvern Clyde Hicks	41,710	6.78%	
Socialist	John F. McKay	9,987	1.62%	+1.37%
Communist	Fred E. Walker	2,532	0.41%	+0.27%
Socialist Labor	Edward Kriz	449	0.07%	−0.60%
Independent	Maslen Meade	378	0.06%	
Majority		144,718	23.54%	
Total votes		614,768	100.00%	
Democratic gain from Republican		Swing	+37.03%	

=== Results by county ===
County	Clarence D. Martin Democratic		John A. Gellatly Republican		L. C. Hicks Liberty		John F. McKay Socialist		All Others Various		Margin		Total votes cast
County	#	%	#	%	#	%	#	%	#	%	#	%	Total votes cast
Adams	1,811	74.34%	613	25.16%	4	0.16%	7	0.29%	1	0.04%	1,198	49.18%	2,436
Asotin	2,147	70.37%	867	28.42%	13	0.43%	21	0.69%	3	0.10%	1,280	41.95%	3,051
Benton	2,978	64.61%	1,492	32.37%	112	2.43%	23	0.50%	4	0.09%	1,486	32.24%	4,609
Chelan	6,467	45.87%	6,673	47.33%	910	6.45%	34	0.24%	14	0.10%	-206	-1.46%	14,098
Clallam	3,612	47.87%	2,058	27.27%	1,798	23.83%	27	0.36%	51	0.68%	1,554	20.59%	7,546
Clark	8,615	56.99%	5,291	35.00%	1,040	6.88%	125	0.83%	45	0.30%	3,324	21.99%	15,116
Columbia	1,489	64.18%	797	34.35%	11	0.47%	23	0.99%	0	0.00%	692	29.83%	2,320
Cowlitz	3,858	34.77%	3,404	30.67%	3,754	33.83%	44	0.40%	37	0.33%	104 (Note: Martin's margin over Hicks)	0.94%	11,097
Douglas	1,822	53.68%	1,391	40.98%	150	4.42%	26	0.77%	5	0.15%	431	12.70%	3,394
Ferry	1,087	74.20%	333	22.73%	27	1.84%	15	1.02%	3	0.20%	754	51.47%	1,465
Franklin	1,715	68.82%	742	29.78%	8	0.32%	18	0.72%	9	0.36%	973	39.04%	2,492
Garfield	869	58.01%	559	37.32%	66	4.41%	2	0.13%	2	0.13%	310	20.69%	1,498
Grant	1,505	61.93%	776	31.93%	129	5.31%	17	0.70%	3	0.12%	729	30.00%	2,430
Grays Harbor	9,010	48.62%	5,100	27.52%	4,141	22.35%	41	0.22%	238	1.28%	3,910	21.10%	18,530
Island	1,551	57.94%	811	30.30%	280	10.46%	25	0.93%	10	0.37%	740	27.64%	2,677
Jefferson	1,660	50.52%	1,222	37.19%	380	11.56%	18	0.55%	6	0.18%	438	13.33%	3,286
King	104,156	56.92%	68,629	37.50%	4,905	2.68%	4,347	2.38%	960	0.52%	35,527	19.41%	182,997
Kitsap	9,538	67.33%	4,083	28.82%	377	2.66%	119	0.84%	49	0.35%	5,455	38.51%	14,166
Kittitas	4,293	63.74%	1,952	28.98%	340	5.05%	108	1.60%	42	0.62%	2,341	34.76%	6,735
Klickitat	1,937	52.76%	1,642	44.73%	24	0.65%	37	1.01%	31	0.84%	295	8.04%	3,671
Lewis	7,728	48.82%	4,644	29.34%	3,380	21.35%	26	0.16%	52	0.33%	3,084	19.48%	15,830
Lincoln	3,094	66.81%	1,485	32.07%	17	0.37%	34	0.73%	1	0.02%	1,609	34.74%	4,631
Mason	2,023	51.87%	1,018	26.10%	843	21.62%	11	0.28%	5	0.13%	1,005	25.77%	3,900
Okanogan	3,763	53.42%	2,688	38.16%	541	7.68%	46	0.65%	6	0.09%	1,075	15.26%	7,044
Pacific	2,815	49.68%	1,941	34.26%	832	14.68%	21	0.37%	57	1.01%	874	15.43%	5,666
Pend Oreille	2,017	72.95%	674	24.38%	8	0.29%	59	2.13%	7	0.25%	1,343	48.57%	2,765
Pierce	35,693	55.00%	20,244	31.19%	7,656	11.80%	1,030	1.59%	273	0.42%	15,449	23.81%	64,896
San Juan	694	47.37%	689	47.03%	74	5.05%	6	0.41%	2	0.14%	5	0.34%	1,465
Skagit	8,012	57.52%	4,784	34.35%	621	4.46%	74	0.53%	437	3.14%	3,228	23.18%	13,928
Skamania	651	44.87%	762	52.52%	20	1.38%	13	0.90%	5	0.34%	-111	-7.65%	1,451
Snohomish	17,818	57.45%	9,928	32.01%	2,212	7.13%	876	2.82%	182	0.59%	7,890	25.44%	31,016
Spokane	45,993	70.45%	17,219	26.38%	266	0.41%	1,617	2.48%	187	0.29%	28,774	44.08%	65,282
Stevens	4,853	68.83%	1,898	26.92%	88	1.25%	186	2.64%	26	0.37%	2,955	41.91%	7,051
Thurston	5,312	38.38%	4,172	30.14%	4,202	30.36%	30	0.22%	124	0.90%	1,110	8.02%	13,840
Wahkiakum	517	38.27%	510	37.75%	304	22.50%	6	0.44%	14	1.04%	7	0.52%	1,351
Walla Walla	5,975	55.92%	4,615	43.20%	18	0.17%	69	0.65%	7	0.07%	1,360	12.73%	10,684
Whatcom	11,201	50.05%	9,675	43.23%	552	2.47%	566	2.53%	386	1.72%	1,526	6.82%	22,380
Whitman	7,303	66.12%	3,626	32.83%	12	0.11%	97	0.88%	7	0.06%	3,677	33.29%	11,045
Yakima	16,633	61.77%	8,490	31.53%	1,595	5.92%	143	0.53%	68	0.25%	8,143	30.24%	26,929
Totals	352,215	57.29%	207,497	33.75%	41,710	6.78%	9,987	1.62%	3,359	0.55%	144,718	23.54%	614,768

==== Counties that flipped from Republican to Democratic ====
- Adams
- Asotin
- Benton
- Clallam
- Clark
- Columbia
- Douglas
- Ferry
- Franklin
- Garfield
- Grant
- Island
- Jefferson
- King
- Kitsap
- Klickitat
- Lincoln
- Mason
- Okanogan
- Pacific
- Pend Oreille
- Pierce
- San Juan
- Skagit
- Snohomish
- Spokane
- Stevens
- Thurston
- Wahkiakum
- Walla Walla
- Whatcom
- Whitman
- Yakima
