= John Arthur Gellatly =

10th Lieutenant Governor of Washington

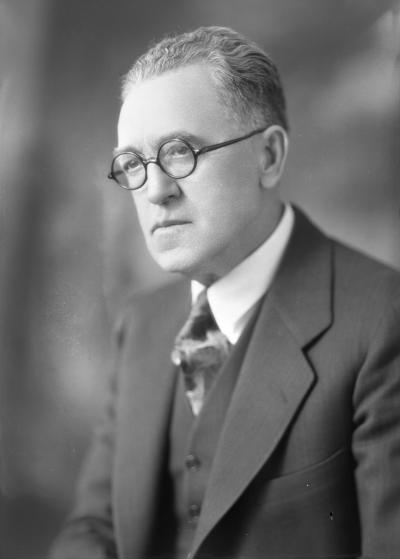
- Gellatly in 1931

10th Lieutenant Governor of Washington
- In office January 16, 1929 – January 11, 1933
- Governor: Roland H. Hartley
- Preceded by: W. Lon Johnson
- Succeeded by: Victor A. Meyers

Member of the Washington House of Representatives from the 56th district
- In office January 13, 1919 – January 10, 1921
- Preceded by: S. A. Pool
- Succeeded by: E. M. Gillette

Personal details
- Born: July 6, 1869 Grass Valley, California, U.S.
- Died: July 18, 1963 (aged 94) Wenatchee, Washington, U.S.
- Party: Republican

John Arthur Gellatly (July 6, 1869 – July 18, 1963) was an American Republican politician from the U.S. state of Washington. He served as the tenth lieutenant governor of Washington and four-term mayor of Wenatchee, Washington.

Gellatly and his family arrived in Wenatchee on October 1, 1900, to start over from a bankruptcy in Benton County, Oregon. Gellatly, who served two terms (four years) as Benton County Recorder (Auditor), was offered the job of Deputy Auditor of Chelan County, Washington. Among the public offices he held in Wenatchee were County Auditor, City Councilman, president of the Chamber of Commerce, manager of the Wenatchee Reclamation District, and four terms as mayor.

In 1918, Gellatly was elected to the Washington House of Representatives where he served a single term. He ran for Governor of Washington in 1920 and placed fifth in the race. In 1928, he ran for and won the office of Lieutenant Governor of Washington. In 1932, he ran for governor and lost to Clarence D. Martin. In 1958, he published a book entitled A History of Wenatchee: The Apple Capital of the World.

Party political offices
Preceded by Roland H. Hartley	Republican nominee for Governor of Washington; 1932	Succeeded by Roland H. Hartley
Political offices
Preceded by W. Lon Johnson	Lieutenant Governor of Washington; 1929–1933	Succeeded by Victor A. Meyers
