= 1932 Louisiana lieutenant gubernatorial election =

- April 19, 1932
Nominee	John B. Fournet
Party	Democratic
Popular vote	110,036
Percentage	99.99%
- Parish results Fournet: 90–100%
Lieutenant Governor before election
Alvin Olin King (Acting)
Democratic
Elected Lieutenant Governor
John B. Fournet
Democratic

The 1932 Louisiana lieutenant gubernatorial election was held on April 19, 1932, in order to elect the lieutenant governor of Louisiana. Democratic nominee and incumbent speaker of the Louisiana House of Representatives John B. Fournet won the election as he ran unopposed.

== General election ==
On election day, April 19, 1932, Democratic nominee John B. Fournet won the election with 110,036 votes as he ran unopposed, thereby retaining Democratic control over the office of lieutenant governor. Fournet was sworn in as the 35th lieutenant governor of Louisiana on May 17, 1932.

=== Results ===
Louisiana lieutenant gubernatorial election, 1932
Party	Candidate	Votes	%
Democratic	John B. Fournet	110,036	99.99
Write-in		13	0.01
Total votes		110,049	100.00
Democratic hold			
