= 1933 New York City aldermanic election =

- November 7, 1933

All 65 seats to the New York City Board of Aldermen 33 seats needed for a majority
	Majority party	Minority party
Party	Democratic	Republican
Seats before	64	1
Seats won	48	17
Seat change	▼16	▲16

Elections were held on November 7, 1933, to fill the 65 seats of the New York City Board of Aldermen. Having been hitherto relegated to one seat held by Joseph Clarke of the 3rd district, Republicans were able to win 17 seats.
