= Clarence D. Martin =

11th governor of Washington, U.S.

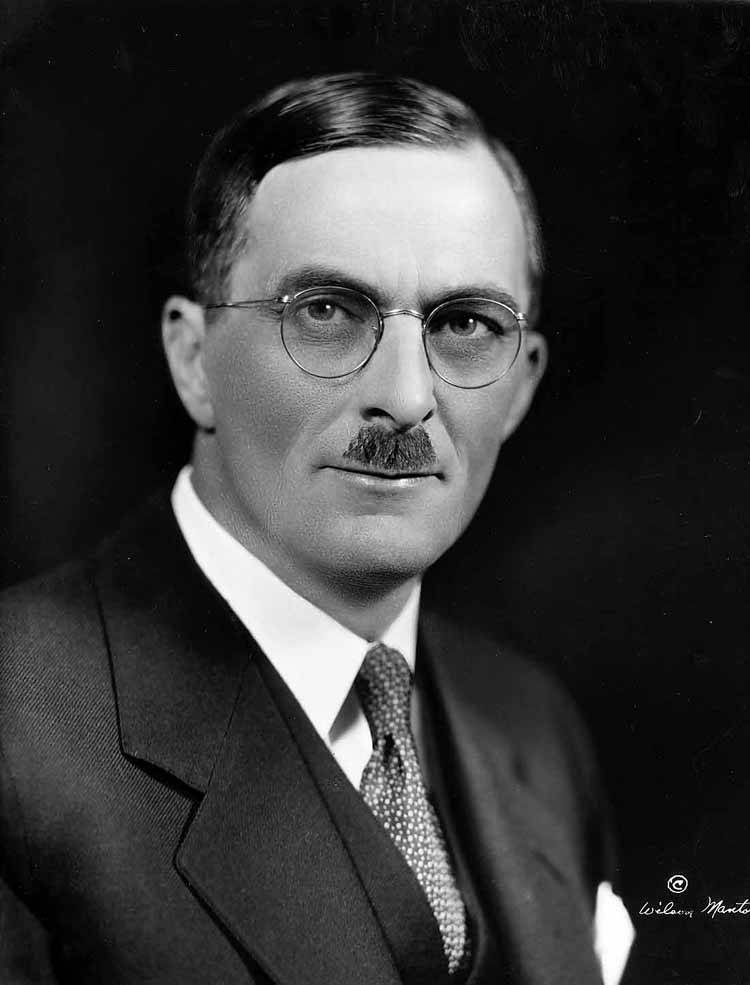

11th Governor of Washington
- In office January 11, 1933 – January 15, 1941
- Lieutenant: Victor A. Meyers
- Preceded by: Roland H. Hartley
- Succeeded by: Arthur B. Langlie

Member of the Washington House of Representatives from the 5th district
- In office February 28, 1944 – January 8, 1945
- Preceded by: Donald B. Miller
- Succeeded by: George H. Johnston

1st Mayor of Cheney, Washington
- In office April 1, 1928 – April 1, 1936
- Preceded by: Office established
- Succeeded by: William Thomas "Tom" Trulove

Personal details
- Born: Clarence Daniel Martin; June 29, 1886 Cheney, Washington Territory, U.S.
- Died: August 11, 1955 (aged 69) Cheney, Washington, U.S.
- Party: Democratic
- Spouses: Margaret Mulligan (m. 1907; div. 1943) Merle L. Lewis (m. 1944; div. 1946) Lou Eckhart (m. 1951)
- Children: 3
- Education: University of Washington (BA)

Clarence Daniel Martin (June 29, 1886 – August 11, 1955) was an American politician who served as the 11th governor of Washington from 1933 to 1941. A member of the Democratic Party, he was appointed to fill a vacancy in the Washington House of Representatives in 1944 and was the first governor born in the territory of the state.

Martin was born and raised in Cheney in the Washington Territory. He graduated from the University of Washington in Seattle in 1906, and joined his father in running the Cheney Grain and Milling Company. From 1928 to 1936 Martin was the mayor of Cheney. While still in office, he ran for and was elected in 1932 as governor of the state of Washington. He was known as the "people's governor" for his strict frugality in government spending, but he also oversaw large economic projects, such as the Grand Coulee Dam, to put people to work during the Great Depression.

He married Margaret Mulligan of Spokane in 1907, and they had three sons. Martin died in 1955 at the age of 69 and is buried at the Fairmount Memorial Park in Spokane.

Martin Stadium and Academic Center, the football stadium at Washington State University in Pullman, was named in his honor at its opening in 1972.

== Early life, education, and early career ==
He was born in Cheney, Washington to Francies M. and Philena Martin, who migrated to eastern Washington from Ohio by way of Portland in the early 1880s. Martin was educated in the Cheney public schools. He graduated from the State Normal School at Cheney in 1903, and completed additional studies at the University of Washington in Seattle, graduating with a BA degree in 1906.

After leaving the university, he joined his wheat-farming father in founding the family business, the F. M. Martin Grain and Milling Company in Cheney. Upon his father's death in 1925, Martin assumed the role of president and general manager of the company. He served in this position until early 1943, when the mill was sold to the National Biscuit Company.

== Early political career ==
Martin's interest in politics first developed in his hometown, leading to his election to the city council in 1915. Following his local involvement, he went on to serve as the mayor of Cheney from 1928 until he was eventually elected as governor. Additionally, during this time, he held the position of chairman of the state Democratic committee.

== Governor of Washington (1933–1941) ==
Martin was elected Governor of Washington in November 1932, in the Democratic landslide which virtually replaced most Republicans in state political offices. He was the first native son to be elected to the state's highest office, an honor of which he was extremely proud. Given the dire economic circumstances and the crisis atmosphere of the early 1930s, Martin's first gubernatorial campaign was remarkable in its moderation. There was no demagoguery, no personalities, no threats, no condemnations and no bitter attacks.

His platform was based on providing unemployment relief and tax reform; he vowed "to return the state government to the service and benefit of the people." By the end of the campaign, he had made 750 speeches and traveled 40,000 miles, but as he said, he "gave away no cigars, kissed no babies and promised no jobs." (Steward, Edgar I. Washington, Northwest Frontier, Vol. II, New York: Lewis Historical Publications, Co., 1957, pp. 296–97). Both in the primary and general elections, Martin's opponents charged him with trying to buy the gubernatorial office. Martin rebutted these accusations by pointing out that he was using his own money for the campaign and therefore would have obligations to no one. His electoral majority was larger than that gained by President Franklin D. Roosevelt in Washington. This ensured that he was not accused of winning the office on the presidential coattails.

=== First term: 1933–1937 ===
Martin took office in January 1933. His first term was controversial, and he was criticized for both his political appointments and his relief programs. Martin alienated hard-core Democrats of the state with the appointment of a number of Republicans to high state offices, many of whom were holdovers from the previous administration of Governor Roland H. Hartley. In justifying his appointment policy, Martin remarked: "I did not get all of my majority from Democrats and I think both parties should be represented." (Spokesman Review, April 19, 1933 p. 3) Martin recognized the need to set aside partisan politics to effectively combat the Depression.

When Martin took office in January 1933, the Great Depression was at its height. In his first inaugural message, Governor Martin acknowledged the severity of the economic crisis. But he recounted the natural and human resources of the state and concluded that "surely, with such resources at hand, we need only the spirit to seek, the determination to build, the genius to create, and the readiness to cooperate toward a common development." He believed it was the primary duty of government to promote the common good; state government must promote constructive, although perhaps unpopular programs, and the people must accept the necessary sacrifices. Martin advocated abandonment of traditional approaches to problem-solving when those approaches proved inadequate. His call for state government action anticipated a similar call on the national level by President Roosevelt.

Those first few months in office were a time of intense activity. Martin proposed increased economy of government through the elimination of waste and the reduction of state employees' salaries; Martin later proposed and the Legislature endorsed a salary reduction of from 10 to 25 percent of all state employees. Martin planned to shift the relief burden from the nearly bankrupt county and local agencies to the state government. He recommended a $10,000,000 bond issue which was to be used to fund employment on minor public works projects. The Legislature approved this bond issue and relief measures were soon forthcoming. He then proposed a complete restructuring of the tax system. In the November 1932 election, the people of the state had affirmed a 40-mill limit on property taxes. This ceiling on the property tax made new sources on tax revenue necessary. Martin proposed a sales tax as a short term, stop-gap measure; he believed that this sales tax would ultimately be replaced by a form of business and occupation tax. The business and occupation tax was enacted during the twenty-third legislative session, but was declared unconstitutional by the State Supreme Court in September, 1933, after a long and bitter struggle. Washington was one forward a contributory system of old-age insurance. Washington was one of the firsts of the northwestern states to enter the field of old-age insurance when the Legislature passed the social security measure in February, 1933. Although the 1933 Legislature failed to provide adequate funding for the pension program, it did establish a needed precedent. In 1935, the Legislature provided additional funds for the program.

Governor Martin advocated a number of urgent projects in his first inaugural address. He proposed restructuring of the state banking laws to prevent future closures. Education was a particularly important part of the Governor's program. He proposed that the state assume 50 percent of the funding burden of the public school system to insure the continued quality and equality of education. He recommended an "open door" policy at the university level for all Washington high school graduates to promote equality of opportunity for higher education. With respect to mortgage debts, Martin believed that some modification of the foreclosure procedure should be enacted to provide a "breathing spell" for those farmers and homeowners threatened with the loss of their property. (Martin, Clarence D. First Inaugural Message, 1933. Olympia, Washington: Jay Tomas Printer, 1933)

Martin's first months in office paralleled the feverish activity of the new federal administration. He initiated many programs to fight the depression in the state. An active and constructive fight against the depression characterized his administration, a sharp contrast to the passive acknowledgement shown by the Hartley regime. Martin sought to create jobs rather than provide handouts for the citizens of the state. The Grand Coulee Dam project, initiated early in 1933, was one of the major job-creating projects. In March 1933, the state legislature, at the prodding of the governor, created the Columbia Basin Commission; in June 1933, $377,000 of the ten million dollar bond issue was appropriated for the dam to show the federal government that the state was serious about the project. Roosevelt set aside 63 million dollars for construction of the low dam at Grand Coulee. Governor Martin was on hand for the ground-breaking ceremonies in September, 1933, and he poured the first bucket of cement in December, 1935. Roosevelt approved construction of the high dam with hydroelectric generating capacity in June, 1935, and by the end of Martin's second term Grand Coulee Dam was producing electricity. In the long run Grand Coulee Dam provided electricity for industry and home, as well as irrigation water for the Columbia Basin. Its short-term benefits were equally important for the state. The project provided immediate employment for thousands left jobless in the wake of the Great Depression. Other significant construction projects during Martin's administration eased the burden of unemployment in the state. Both the Lake Washington Floating Bridge and the ill-fated Tacoma Narrows Bridge were completed in 1940 and provided necessary public service as well as jobs for many unemployed. The ambitious project to harness the Columbia River with the Bonneville Dam also provided both electricity and jobs.

The accomplishments of Martin's administration were not limited to physical construction projects. His keen interest in education insured the continued funding and development of the public school system in the state at a time when local agencies were unable to provide adequate monies and the system's continuation was in grave danger. Martin also maintained his commitment to higher education. Despite financial hard times for the state, Martin supported an extensive building program at Washington State College, a program facilitated by Martin's respect for and friendship with President E. O. Holland. Martin's administration also reorganized the state's highway system providing miles of new and improved roads as well as many new jobs. He also directed the reorganization of the State Highway Patrol. With the end of prohibition the state of Washington secured much needed revenue by organizing and operating the retail liquor business. The liquor control system established by the Martin administration is still with us today. His dealings with the federal government, although strained at times, secured for the state a substantial portion of the New Deal aid necessary for economic reconstruction.

=== Second term: 1937–1941 ===
Governor Martin was re-elected in 1936, soundly defeating former Governor Hartley. His majority in 1936, which was greater than that of his first election and again larger than President Roosevelt's statewide vote, reflected the popular confidence in his administration. His second term continued the sound fiscal practices and businesslike government he had initiated in 1933. He sought an unprecedented third term in 1940, but was defeated in the primary by former Senator C. C. Dill, who, although supported by Martin in the general election, was defeated in an exceedingly close contest by Republican Arthur B. Langlie.

== Late political career ==
Martin's political career and aspirations did not end with his tenure as governor. In February, 1944, Governor Martin was appointed to fill a vacancy in the state House of Representatives from the Fifth District and served a special session. In 1948 he again sought election to the state's highest office but was defeated in the primary. He was reelected to the Cheney City Council in 1950.

== Personal life ==
Martin married Margaret Mulligan on July 18, 1907. They had three sons: William F., Clarence D., Jr. and Frank M. He and his wife were divorced in August 1943. Martin remarried in April 1944, and with his new bride, the former Merle L. Lewis of Spokane, left Cheney and settled in southern California, but were divorced in March 1946. Martin married his third wife, Lou Eckhart, in December 1951, and they lived in Cheney until his death on August 11, 1955.

== Civic life ==
Martin's public commitment to the welfare of the state's citizens is documented by the deeds of his administration, but his private actions also reveal a man of generosity and compassion. Martin personally aided a number of worthy young men with their college educations, as well as providing scholarship funds for his alma mater, the newly named Eastern Washington College of Education at Cheney. He continued his interest in debate and public speaking, activities at which he excelled in college, by sponsoring an annual oratorical contest in Cheney. He took a personal interest in the case of a child of twelve who killed an Asotin sheriff during a robbery. With Martin's aid, the youngster was rehabilitated and went on to lead a productive life. Martin also used his financial resources to benefit the citizens of his home town. Earlier, while Mayor of Cheney, Martin donated the city's street lighting system in the memory of his father.

== Martin Stadium ==
Martin Stadium and Academic Center, an outdoor athletic stadium at Washington State University in Pullman, is named for him. His middle son Dan (Clarence D. Martin, Jr., 1916–1976), made a sizable donation to the project in January 1972.

== Legacy ==
Philosophically and politically Martin was a conservative Democrat who, while governor, placed the welfare of the people of the state above party politics. His tenure as governor reflected the sound business and financial practices which guided his entire life. He tempered fiscal conservatism with humanitarian concern for those suffering under the height of the depression. When Martin left office there was still unemployment and economic distress, but the state had weathered the worst years of the depression. One historian records that when Martin left office "the state was solvent, the radical left-wing groups had been kept in check, and there had been no compromise with Socialistic panaceas." Upon his death the Spokesman Review editorialized that "He served the state well throughout eight critical years of its history." In the opinion of many, he was the best governor the state had ever had.

== See also ==
- List of governors of Washington

Party political offices
Preceded by A. Scott Bullitt	Democratic nominee for Governor of Washington; 1932, 1936	Succeeded by Clarence Dill
Political offices
Preceded by Roland H. Hartley	Governor of Washington; 1933–1941	Succeeded by Arthur B. Langlie
