= 1933 United States gubernatorial elections =

- November 7, 1933

1 governorship
	Majority party	Minority party
Party	Democratic	Republican
Seats before	38	8
Seats after	38	8
Seat change	Steady	Steady
Seats up	1	0
Seats won	1	0
- Democratic hold

United States gubernatorial elections were held in 1933, in the state of Virginia. Virginia holds its gubernatorial elections in odd numbered years, every 4 years, following the United States presidential election year.

== Race summary ==
=== Results ===
State	Incumbent	Party	First elected	Result	Candidates
Virginia	John Garland Pollard	Democratic	1929	Incumbent term-limited. New governor elected. Democratic hold.	✓ George Campbell Peery (Democratic) 73.74%; Fred W. McWane (Republican) 24.24%; Andrew J. Dunning (Prohibition) 0.67%; George C. White (Socialist) 0.67%; John Moffett Robinson (Independent) 0.53%; W. A. Rowe (Independent) 0.16%
