= 1932 New York gubernatorial election =

- November 8, 1932
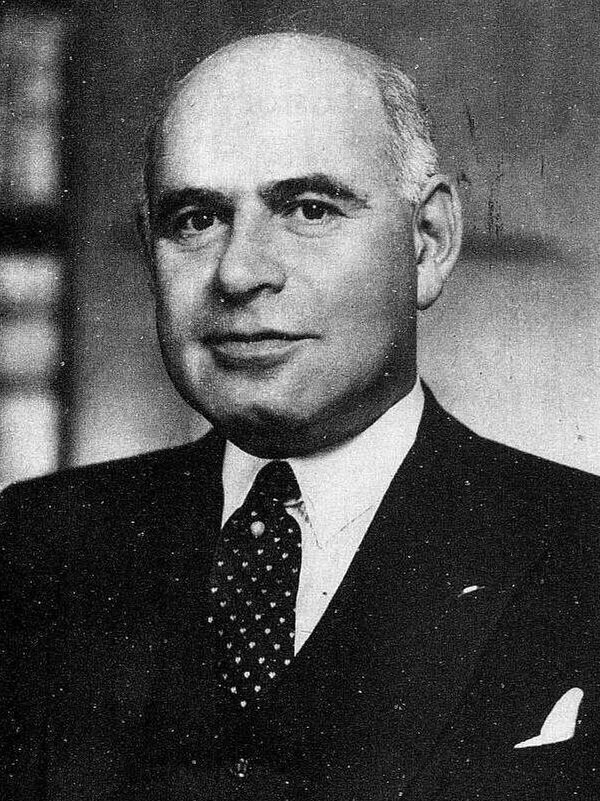

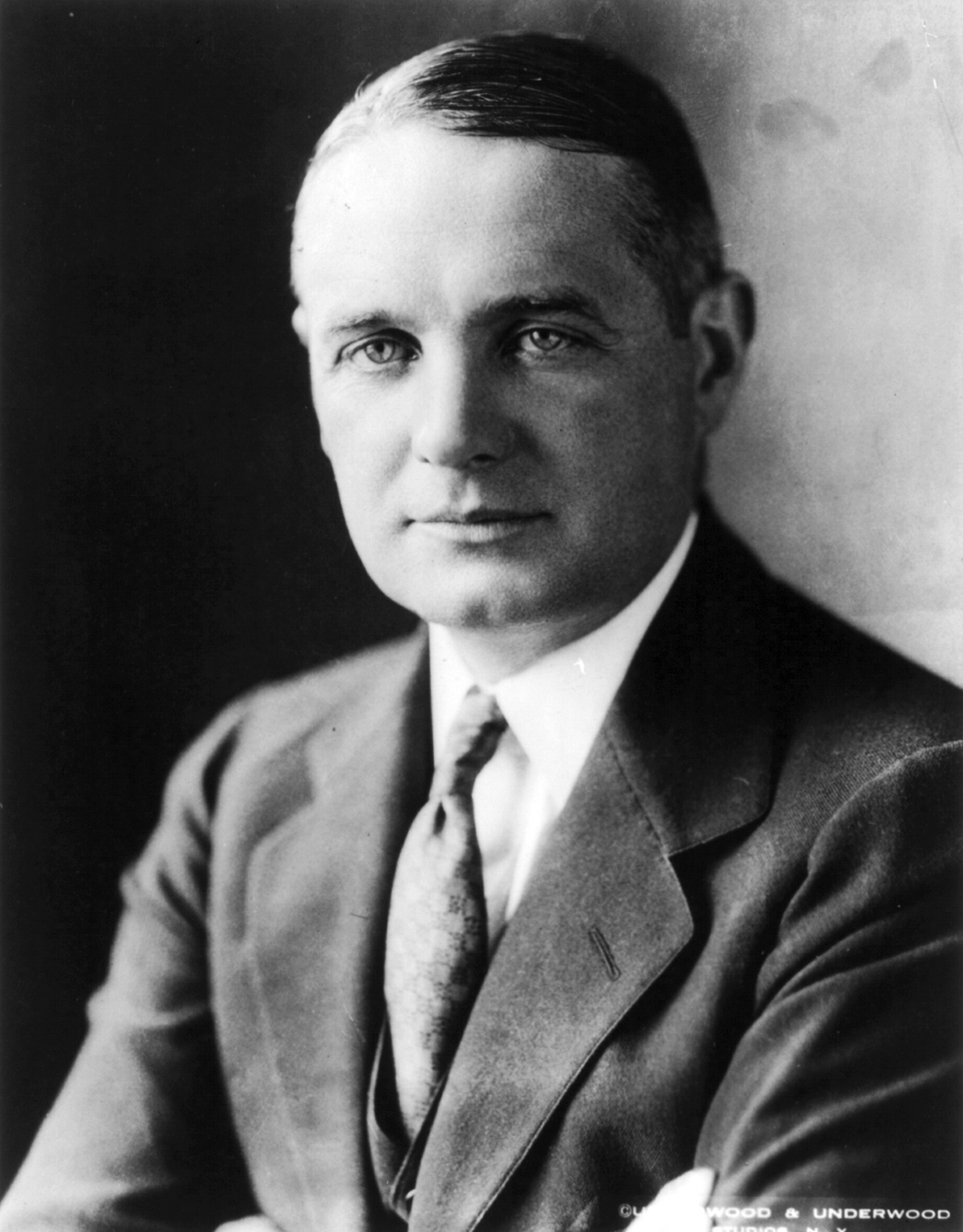
Nominee	Herbert H. Lehman	William J. Donovan
Party	Democratic	Republican
Popular vote	2,659,519	1,812,080
Percentage	56.69%	38.62%
- County results Lehman: 40–50% 50–60% 60–70% 70–80% Donovan: 40–50% 50–60% 60–70%
Governor before election
Franklin D. Roosevelt
Democratic
Elected Governor
Herbert H. Lehman
Democratic

The 1932 New York gubernatorial election was held on November 8, 1932, to elect the Governor of New York. Incumbent Governor Franklin D. Roosevelt did not seek reelection, and instead successfully ran for President. Democrat Herbert H. Lehman ran for the open seat and won in the general election.

== General election ==
=== Candidates ===
- William J. Donovan, former Assistant Attorney General for the Antitrust Division (Republican)
- Louis Waldman, (Socialist) Crosswaith however declined, instead running for Congress in Harlem, and Charles W. Noonan was substituted on the ticket.
- Herbert H. Lehman, Lieutenant Governor of New York (Democratic)
- Israel Amter, (Communist)
- John F. Vichert, (Law Preservation)
- Aaron M. Orange, (Socialist Labor)

=== Results ===
1932 New York gubernatorial election
Party	Candidate	Votes	%	±%
Democratic	Herbert H. Lehman	2,659,519	56.69%	
Republican	William J. Donovan	1,812,080	38.62%	
Socialist	Louis Waldman	102,959	2.19%	
Law Preservation	John F. Vichert	83,452	1.78%	
Communist	Israel Amter	26,407	0.56%	
Socialist Labor	Aaron M. Orange	7,233	0.15%	
Total votes		4,691,650	100.00%	

== See also ==
- 1932 New York state election
- New York gubernatorial elections
