= 1932 Utah gubernatorial election =

- November 8, 1932
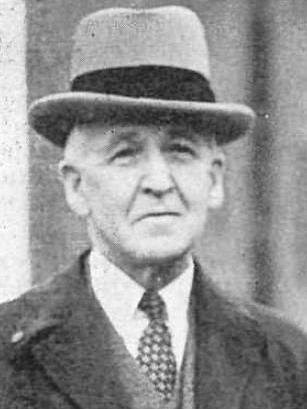

Nominee	Henry H. Blood	William W. Seegmiller
Party	Democratic	Republican
Popular vote	116,031	85,913
Percentage	56.39%	41.76%
- County results Blood: 40–50% 50–60% 60–70% Seegmiller: 50–60% 60–70% 70–80% 80–90%
Governor before election
George Dern
Democratic
Elected Governor
Henry H. Blood
Democratic

The 1932 Utah gubernatorial election was held on November 8, 1932. Democratic nominee Henry H. Blood defeated Republican nominee William W. Seegmiller with 56.39% of the vote.

== General election ==
=== Candidates ===
Major party candidates

- Henry H. Blood, Democratic
- William W. Seegmiller, Republican

Other candidates

- A. L. Porter, Socialist
- Marvin P. Bales, Communist

=== Results ===
1932 Utah gubernatorial election
Party	Candidate	Votes	%	±%
Democratic	Henry H. Blood	116,031	56.39%	−2.10%
Republican	William W. Seegmiller	85,913	41.76%	+0.67%
Socialist	A. L. Porter	2,797	1.36%	+0.94%
Communist	Marvin P. Bales	1,010	0.49%	
Total votes		205,751	100.00%	
Majority		30,118	14.64%	
Democratic hold		Swing	-2.78%	

=== Results by county ===
County	Henry H. Blood Democratic		William W. Seegmiller Republican		A. L. Porter Socialist		Marvin P. Bales Communist		Margin		Total votes cast
County	#	%	#	%	#	%	#	%	#	%	Total votes cast
Beaver	993	45.18%	1,197	54.46%	8	0.36%	0	0.00%	-204	-9.28%	2,198
Box Elder	3,731	54.11%	3,110	45.11%	50	0.73%	4	0.06%	621	9.01%	6,895
Cache	6,842	59.68%	4,570	39.86%	42	0.37%	10	0.09%	2,272	19.82%	11,464
Carbon	3,979	64.46%	2,020	32.72%	167	2.71%	7	0.11%	1,959	31.73%	6,173
Daggett	78	46.71%	88	52.69%	1	0.60%	0	0.00%	-10	-5.99%	167
Davis	3,064	55.01%	2,460	44.17%	36	0.65%	10	0.18%	604	10.84%	5,570
Duchesne	1,518	49.92%	1,412	46.43%	108	3.55%	3	0.10%	106	3.49%	3,041
Emery	1,229	43.60%	1,459	51.76%	129	4.58%	2	0.07%	-230	-8.16%	2,819
Garfield	325	19.87%	1,298	79.34%	13	0.79%	0	0.00%	-973	-59.47%	1,636
Grand	488	61.46%	294	37.03%	12	1.51%	0	0.00%	194	24.43%	794
Iron	1,405	44.35%	1,597	50.41%	166	5.24%	0	0.00%	-192	-6.06%	3,168
Juab	1,944	59.83%	1,267	39.00%	38	1.17%	0	0.00%	677	20.84%	3,249
Kane	143	16.61%	714	82.93%	4	0.46%	0	0.00%	-571	-66.32%	861
Millard	1,651	42.99%	2,146	55.89%	42	1.09%	1	0.03%	-495	-12.89%	3,840
Morgan	546	46.79%	615	52.70%	6	0.51%	0	0.00%	-69	-5.91%	1,167
Piute	331	38.62%	511	59.63%	15	1.75%	0	0.00%	-180	-21.00%	857
Rich	379	43.66%	486	55.99%	3	0.35%	0	0.00%	-107	-12.33%	868
Salt Lake	49,614	60.68%	30,591	37.41%	764	0.93%	798	0.98%	19,023	23.26%	81,767
San Juan	559	60.63%	356	38.61%	6	0.65%	1	0.11%	203	22.02%	922
Sanpete	3,303	48.16%	3,486	50.82%	69	1.01%	1	0.01%	-183	-2.67%	6,859
Sevier	2,045	45.06%	2,455	54.10%	37	0.82%	1	0.02%	-410	-9.03%	4,538
Summit	1,963	55.88%	1,489	42.39%	57	1.62%	4	0.11%	474	13.49%	3,513
Tooele	1,844	55.59%	1,439	43.38%	31	0.93%	3	0.09%	405	12.21%	3,317
Uintah	1,832	57.29%	1,326	41.46%	37	1.16%	3	0.09%	506	15.82%	3,198
Utah	12,101	59.24%	7,965	38.99%	260	1.27%	101	0.49%	4,136	20.25%	20,427
Wasatch	1,026	47.63%	1,119	51.95%	9	0.42%	0	0.00%	-93	-4.32%	2,154
Washington	1,443	47.99%	1,552	51.61%	11	0.37%	1	0.03%	-109	-3.62%	3,007
Wayne	246	30.83%	548	68.67%	4	0.50%	0	0.00%	-302	-37.84%	798
Weber	11,409	55.70%	8,343	40.73%	672	3.28%	60	0.29%	3,066	14.97%	20,484
Total	116,031	56.39%	85,913	41.76%	2,797	1.36%	1,010	0.49%	30,118	14.64%	205,751

==== Counties that flipped from Republican to Democratic ====
- Uintah
- Weber

==== Counties that flipped from Democratic to Republican ====
- Beaver
- Millard
- Morgan
- Sanpete
- Wasatch
