= Roland H. Hartley =

10th governor of Washington

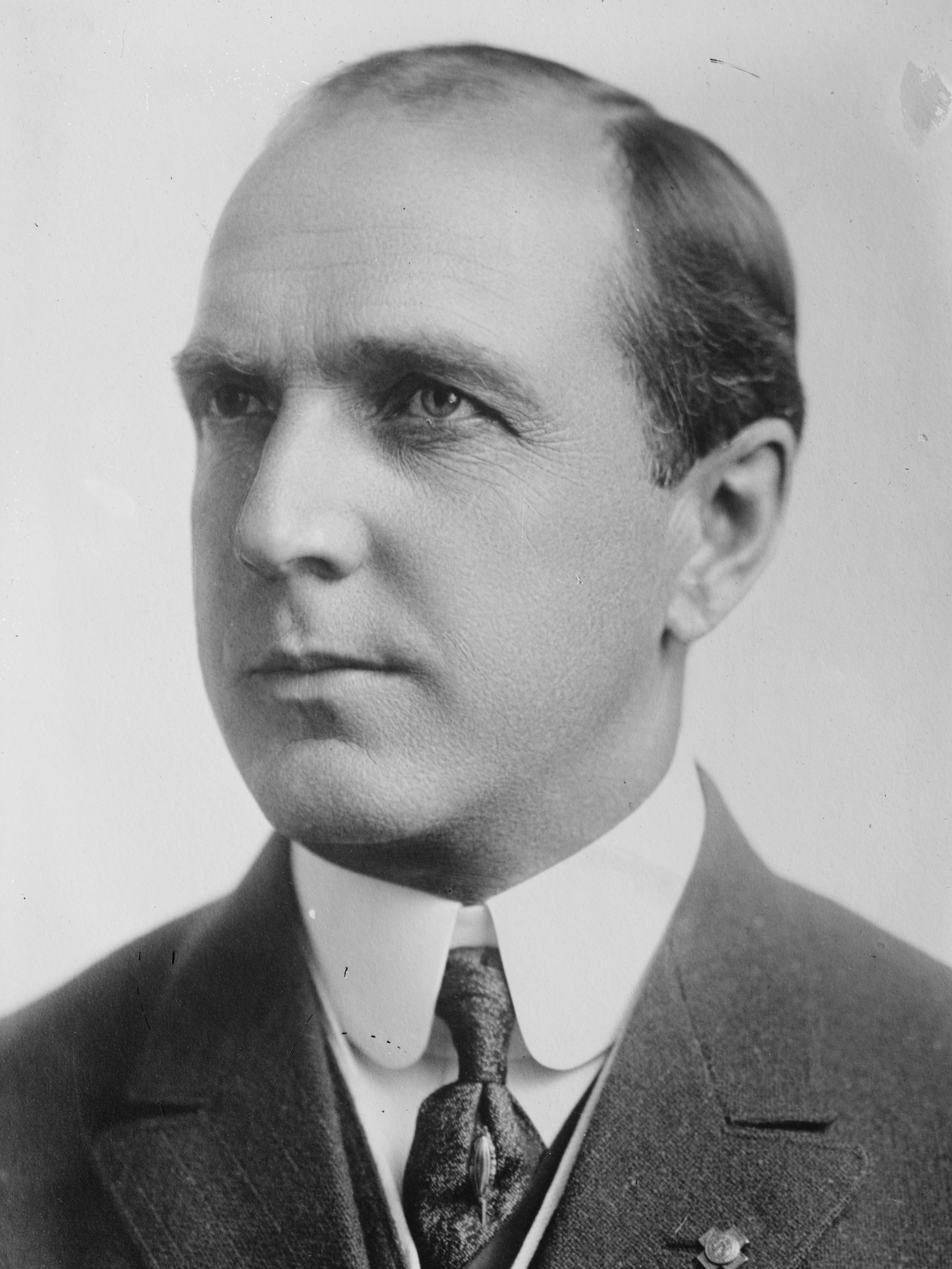

10th Governor of Washington
- In office January 14, 1925 – January 11, 1933
- Lieutenant: W. Lon Johnson; John Arthur Gellatly
- Preceded by: Louis F. Hart
- Succeeded by: Clarence D. Martin

Member of the Washington House of Representatives from the 48th district
- In office January 11, 1915 – January 8, 1917
- Preceded by: Fred K. Overman
- Succeeded by: S. Frank Spencer

13th Mayor of Everett, Washington
- In office January 1, 1910 – January 1, 1912
- Preceded by: Newton Jones
- Succeeded by: Richard B. Hassell

Personal details
- Born: Roland Hill Hartley; June 26, 1864 Shogomoc, Colony of New Brunswick, British North America
- Died: September 21, 1952 (aged 88) Seattle, Washington, U.S.
- Party: Republican

Roland Hill Hartley (June 26, 1864 – September 21, 1952) was a Canadian-American politician who served as the tenth governor of Washington from 1925 to 1933. A member of the Republican Party, he was defeated for a third term during the Great Depression and was succeeded by Democrat Clarence D. Martin in 1933.

Born in New Brunswick, Canada, he moved to Minnesota in the United States as a young man and entered the timber industry. In 1902 he moved to Everett, Washington, where he ultimately had interests in several timber companies and a tugboat company.

In 1910 he entered electoral politics, serving one term as mayor of Everett. Later he was elected to the State House, where he served one term.

== Early life ==
Hartley, the eighth of twelve children, was born at Shogomoc in the British colony of New Brunswick on June 26, 1864. (It became the Province of New Brunswick after Canadian Confederation in 1867). He was the son of Rev. Edward Hartley and Rebecca Barker (Whitehead) Hartley.

Hartley moved to Minnesota about 1878, joining older brothers Wilder, Benjamin, and Guilford in Brainerd, Minnesota.

== Career ==
=== Business ===
After moving to Minnesota, he worked summers on bonanza farms in Dakota Territory and winters in the logging industry. He later relocated to Minneapolis, finding work as a bookkeeper for Clough Brothers Lumber Company.

In 1888, he married Nina M. Clough, daughter of David Clough, cementing his ties to Clough Brothers. The couple had three children, Edward, David, and Mary.

Hartley rose to become manager and then Vice President of Clough Brothers. His father-in-law was elected Governor of Minnesota in 1895, and in 1897 Hartley began serving as his private secretary. During the Spanish–American War of 1898, he additionally served as the Governor's representative and staff aide to the Minnesota National Guard, acquiring the honorific title of Colonel.

In 1900, David Clough moved to Everett, Washington to establish a new sawmill. Hartley, in turn, managed development of the new Cass Lake, Minnesota townsite for his older brother Guildford Hartley.

Hartley rejoined his father-in-law in Everett in 1902, eventually assuming roles as either manager or owner of Hartley and Lovejoy Logging Company, the Clark-Nickerson Lumber Company, the Everett Logging Company, the Clough-Hartley Mill, and Everett City Tug Boat Company.

=== Politics ===
Hartley had joined the Republican Party. He was elected mayor of Everett, Washington, serving one term from 1910 to 1912. He was next elected in 1914 to the Washington House of Representatives, serving from 1915 to 1917.

Hartley was elected, in 1925, as tenth governor of Washington. His father-in-law David Clough arranged to have the gavel used for his swearing-in as governor of Minnesota to be the one used for the swearing-in of his son-in-law Hartley as governor in Washington.

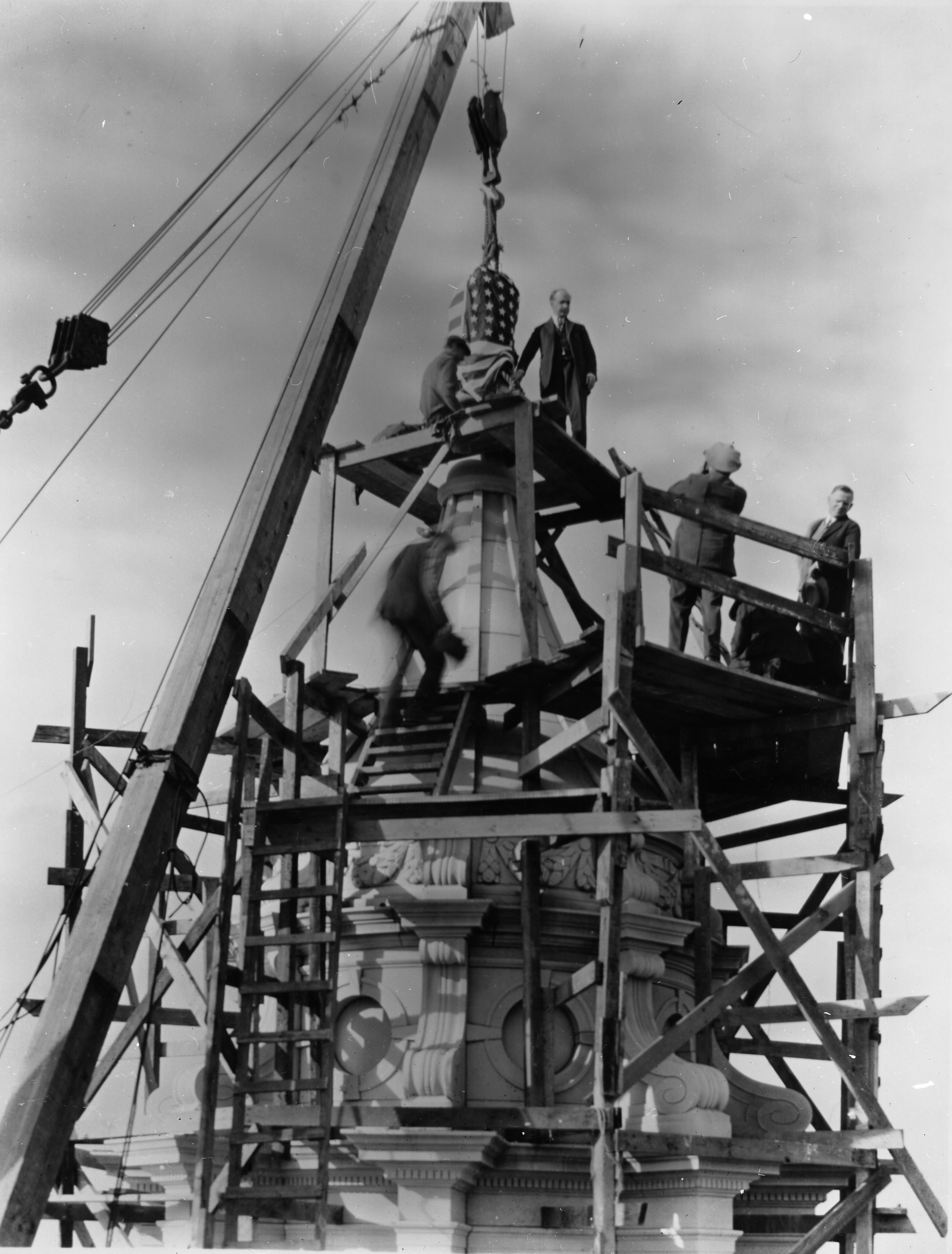
Hartley atop Legislative Building installation, October 13, 1926.

Hartley's major accomplishments during his governorship were the creation of a centralized state highway department and passage of new state timber laws.

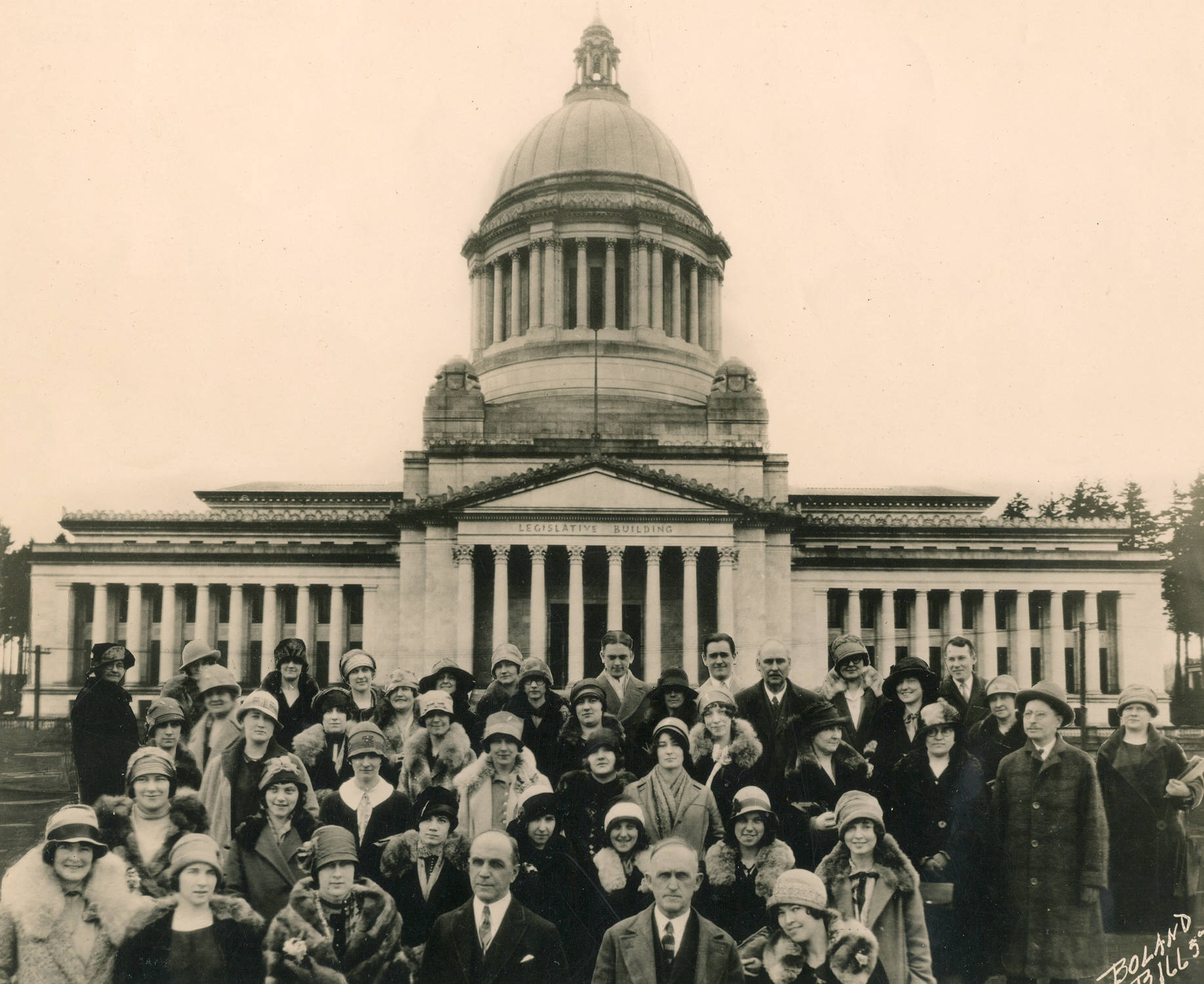
Hartley (left front row) with 30 members of the Tacoma Young Business Women's Club in front of the newly built Washington State Capitol, March 1927.

In 1925, he vetoed House Bill 131, which would have created a separate state prison for women. The bill had passed the legislature under the sponsorship of Belle Reeves (D-Chelan County) and Mabel Ingersoll Miller (R-Snohomish County). In his veto message, Hartley wrote that if the bill

is to provide an institution in which the state is to undertake the moral and physical regeneration of hapless and fallen women, the effort is futile and the undertaking doomed to failure before it is begun. Morality cannot be legislated, nor is there any escape from the truth of the saying, "Protect a fool against his follies and you populate the world with fools."

Hartley was the first Washington Republican governor to serve two terms and to run for a third. He lost the Republican primary to lieutenant governor John Arthur Gellatly and was succeeded by Clarence D. Martin.

== Death ==
Hartley died in Seattle, Washington, on September 21, 1952. He is interred at Evergreen Cemetery (Everett, Washington).

== See also ==
- List of mayors of Everett, Washington
- List of United States governors born outside the United States
- Roland Hartley House, his former home in Everett, Washington, now listed on the National Register of Historic Places

Party political offices
Preceded by Louis F. Hart	Republican nominee for Governor of Washington; 1924, 1928	Succeeded by John Arthur Gellatly
Preceded by John Arthur Gellatly	Republican nominee for Governor of Washington; 1936	Succeeded by Arthur B. Langlie
Political offices
Preceded by Louis F. Hart	Governor of Washington; 1925–1933	Succeeded by Clarence D. Martin
