= List of elections in 1934 =

The following elections occurred in the year 1934.

== Africa ==
- 1934 Southern Rhodesian general election
- 1934 Southern Rhodesian sweepstakes referendum
- 1934 South-West African legislative election

== Asia ==
- 1934 Afghan parliamentary election
- 1934 Iraqi parliamentary election
- 1934 Philippine Constitutional Convention election
- 1934 Philippine House of Representatives elections
- 1934 Philippine Senate elections

== Europe ==
- 1934 Catalan local elections
- 1934 Czechoslovak presidential election
- 1934 Icelandic parliamentary election
- 1934 Irish local elections
- 1934 Italian general election
- 1934 Luxembourg general election
- 1934 Norwegian local elections
- 1934 Portuguese legislative election

=== Germany ===
- 1934 German referendum

=== United Kingdom ===
- 1934 Basingstoke by-election
- 1934 Cambridge by-election
- 1934 Combined Scottish Universities by-election
- 1934 Fermanagh and Tyrone by-election
- 1934 Hammersmith North by-election
- 1934 Hemsworth by-election
- 1934 Lambeth North by-election
- 1934 Lowestoft by-election
- 1934 Merthyr by-election
- 1934 Monmouth by-election
- 1934 Portsmouth North by-election
- 1934 Putney by-election
- 1934 Rushcliffe by-election
- 1934 Swindon by-election
- 1934 Twickenham by-election
- 1934 Upton by-election
- 1934 Weston-super-Mare by-election
- 1934 United Kingdom local elections

==== United Kingdom local ====
===== English local =====
- 1934 Bermondsey Borough election
- 1934 Southwark Borough election

== North America ==
- 1934 Costa Rican parliamentary election
- 1934 Honduran legislative election
- 1934 Mexican general election
- 1934 Nicaraguan parliamentary election

=== Canada ===
- 1934 Edmonton municipal election
- 1934 Ontario general election
- 1934 Ottawa municipal election
- 1934 Saskatchewan general election
- 1934 Toronto municipal election
- 1934 Yukon general election

=== Caribbean ===
- 1934 Dominican Republic general election

=== United States ===
- 1934 New York state election
- 1934 United States elections

==== United States lieutenant gubernatorial ====
- 1934 California lieutenant gubernatorial election
- 1934 Connecticut lieutenant gubernatorial election
- 1934 Minnesota lieutenant gubernatorial election
- 1934 Nebraska lieutenant gubernatorial election
- 1934 Texas lieutenant gubernatorial election
- 1934 Wisconsin lieutenant gubernatorial election

==== United States gubernatorial ====
- 1934 Alabama gubernatorial election
- 1934 Arizona gubernatorial election
- 1934 Arkansas gubernatorial election
- 1934 California gubernatorial election
- 1934 Colorado gubernatorial election
- 1934 Connecticut gubernatorial election
- 1934 Georgia gubernatorial election
- 1934 Idaho gubernatorial election
- 1934 Iowa gubernatorial election
- 1934 Kansas gubernatorial election
- 1934 Maine gubernatorial election
- 1934 Maryland gubernatorial election
- 1934 Massachusetts gubernatorial election
- 1934 Michigan gubernatorial election
- 1934 Minnesota gubernatorial election
- 1934 Nebraska gubernatorial election
- 1934 Nevada gubernatorial election
- 1934 New Hampshire gubernatorial election
- 1934 New Jersey gubernatorial election
- 1934 New Mexico gubernatorial election
- 1934 New York gubernatorial election
- 1934 North Dakota gubernatorial election
- 1934 Ohio gubernatorial election
- 1934 Oklahoma gubernatorial election
- 1934 Oregon gubernatorial election
- 1934 Pennsylvania gubernatorial election
- 1934 Rhode Island gubernatorial election
- 1934 South Carolina gubernatorial election
- 1934 South Dakota gubernatorial election
- 1934 Tennessee gubernatorial election
- 1934 Texas gubernatorial election
- 1934 United States gubernatorial elections
- 1934 Vermont gubernatorial election
- 1934 Wisconsin gubernatorial election
- 1934 Wyoming gubernatorial election

==== United States House of Representatives ====
- 1934 United States House of Representatives elections
- 1934 United States House of Representatives elections in California
- 1934 United States House of Representatives elections in South Carolina

==== United States Senate ====
- 1934 United States Senate elections
- 1934 United States Senate election in Arizona
- 1934 United States Senate election in California
- 1934 United States Senate election in Connecticut
- 1934 United States Senate election in Delaware
- 1934 United States Senate election in Florida
- 1934 United States Senate election in Indiana
- 1934 United States Senate election in Maine
- 1934 United States Senate election in Maryland
- 1934 United States Senate election in Massachusetts
- 1934 United States Senate election in Michigan
- 1934 United States Senate election in Minnesota
- 1934 United States Senate election in Mississippi
- 1934 United States Senate election in Missouri
- 1934 United States Senate election in Montana
- 1934 United States Senate special election in Montana
- 1934 United States Senate election in Nebraska
- 1934 United States Senate election in New Jersey
- 1934 United States Senate election in New York
- 1934 United States Senate election in North Dakota
- 1934 United States Senate election in Ohio
- 1934 United States Senate election in Pennsylvania
- 1934 United States Senate election in Tennessee
- 1934 United States Senate special election in Tennessee
- 1934 United States Senate election in Texas
- 1934 United States Senate election in Vermont
- 1934 United States Senate special election in Vermont
- 1934 United States Senate election in Virginia
- 1934 United States Senate election in Washington
- 1934 United States Senate election in Wisconsin
- 1934 United States Senate elections in Wyoming

==== United States mayoral elections ====
- 1934 Evansville mayoral election
- 1934 New Orleans mayoral election

== South America ==
- 1934 Argentine legislative election
- 1934 Bolivian general election
- 1934 Brazilian legislative election
- 1934 Brazilian presidential election
- 1934 Colombian presidential election
- 1934 Uruguayan parliamentary election
- 1934 Uruguayan constitutional referendum

== Oceania ==
=== Australia ===
- 1934 Australian federal election
- 1934 Gloucester state by-election
- 1934 Hamilton state by-election
- 1934 Leichhardt state by-election
- 1934 Tasmanian state election

== See also ==
- Category:1934 elections
