= 1934 United States gubernatorial elections =

- November 6, 1934; September 10, 1934 (ME)

34 governorships
	Majority party	Minority party
Party	Democratic	Republican
Seats before	37	9 (Note: Horace Griggs Prall (R) succeeded New Jersey Governor A. Harry Moore (D) who resigned to take a seat in the U.S. Senate in January 1935.)
Seats after	38	8
Seat change	▲1	▼1
Seats up	24	8
Seats won	25	7
	Third party	Fourth party
Party	Farmer–Labor	Progressive
Seats before	1	0
Seats after	1	1
Seat change	Steady	▲1
Seats up	1	0
Seats won	1	1
	Fifth party
Party	Independent
Seats before	1
Seats after	0
Seat change	▼1
Seats up	1
Seats won	0
- Democratic gain Democratic hold Republican gain Republican hold Farmer–Labor hold Progressive gain

United States gubernatorial elections were held in 1934, in 34 states, concurrent with the House and Senate elections, on November 6, 1934. Elections took place on September 10 in Maine.

== Results ==
State	Incumbent	Party	Status	Opposing candidates
Alabama	Benjamin M. Miller	Democratic	Term-limited, Democratic victory	Bibb Graves (Democratic) 86.93% Edmund H. Dryer (Republican) 12.67% Arlie Barber (Socialist) 0.25% J. M. Davis (Communist) 0.15%
Arizona	Benjamin Baker Moeur	Democratic	Re-elected, 59.65%	Thomas Maddock (Republican) 38.15% Lawrence McGivern (Socialist) 1.83% Clay Naff (Communist) 0.36%
Arkansas	Junius Marion Futrell	Democratic	Re-elected, 89.19%	G. C. Ledbetter (Republican) 9.44% J. Russell Butler (Socialist) 1.37%
California	Frank F. Merriam	Republican	Re-elected, 48.87%	Upton Sinclair (Democratic) 37.75% Raymond L. Haight (Progressive) 12.99% Sam Darcy (Communist) 0.25% Milen C. Dempster (Socialist) 0.13% Scattering 0.01%
Colorado	Edwin Carl Johnson	Democratic	Re-elected, 58.11%	Nate C. Warren (Republican) 39.91% Paul S. McCormick (Socialist) 1.31% Paul W. Hipp (Prohibition) 0.35% P. C. Feste (Communist) 0.32%
Connecticut	Wilbur L. Cross	Democratic	Re-elected, 46.71%	Hugh Meade Alcorn (Republican) 45.16% Jasper McLevy (Socialist) 6.96% Alvin M. Gully (Socialist Labor) 0.68% William E. Hogan (Independent Citizens) 0.26% Isadore Wofsy (Communist) 0.23%
Georgia	Eugene Talmadge	Democratic	Re-elected, 100.00%	(Democratic primary results); Eugene Talmadge 65.95% Claude Pittman 32.18% Ed Gilliam 1.88%
Idaho	C. Ben Ross	Democratic	Re-elected, 54.58%	Frank L. Stephan (Republican) 44.26% Allen F. Adams (Socialist) 0.68% T. H. Darrow (Commonwealth Prohibition) 0.48%
Iowa	Clyde L. Herring	Democratic	Re-elected, 51.75%	Dan W. Turner (Republican) 43.55% Wallace M. Short (Farmer Labor) 4.09% L. J. U. Smay (Prohibition) 0.24% Arthur W. Saarman (Socialist) 0.21% Ira R. Meade (Communist) 0.17%
Kansas	Alfred M. Landon	Republican	Re-elected, 53.51%	Omar B. Ketchum (Democratic) 45.63% George M. Whiteside (Socialist) 0.86%
Maine (held, 10 September 1934)	Louis J. Brann	Democratic	Re-elected, 53.99%	Alfred K. Ames (Republican) 45.90% Harry Warsaw (Communist) 0.11%
Maryland	Albert C. Ritchie	Democratic	Defeated, 48.32%	Harry Whinna Nice (Republican) 49.52% Broadus Mitchell (Socialist) 1.32% William A. Gillespe (Independent) 0.55% Bernard Ades (Communist) 0.15% Harry B. Galantian (Labor) 0.14%
Massachusetts	Joseph B. Ely	Democratic	Retired, Democratic victory	James Michael Curley (Democratic) 49.65% Gaspar G. Bacon (Republican) 42.30% Frank A. Goodwin (Equal Tax) 6.35% Alfred B. Lewis (Socialist) 0.83% John W. Aiken (Socialist Labor) 0.39% Edward Rand Stevens (Communist) 0.28% Freeman W. Follett (Prohibition) 0.20%
Michigan	William Comstock	Democratic	Defeated in Democratic primary, Republican victory	Frank D. Fitzgerald (Republican) 52.41% Arthur J. Lacy (Democratic) 45.84% Arthur E. Larsen (Socialist) 0.95% Raymond Anderson (Communist) 0.46% Donald D. Alderdyce (Farmer Labor) 0.17% Scattering 0.17%
Minnesota	Floyd B. Olson	Farmer-Labor	Re-elected, 44.61%	Martin A. Nelson (Republican) 37.72% John E. Regan (Democratic) 16.84% Arthur C. Townley (Independent) 0.42% Samuel K. Davis (Communist) 0.41% ()
Nebraska	Charles W. Bryan	Democratic	Retired to run for U.S. Senate, Democratic victory	Roy Cochran (Democratic) 50.84% Dwight P. Griswold (Republican) 47.73% Ralph W. Madison (Independent) 0.83% John J. Schefcik (Independent) 0.60%
Nevada	Morley Griswold	Republican	Defeated, 34.52%	Richard Kirman (Democratic) 53.94% Lindley C. Branson (Independent) 11.54%
New Hampshire	John Gilbert Winant	Republican	Retired, Republican victory	H. Styles Bridges (Republican) 50.55% John L. Sullivan (Democratic) 49.16% Eli Bourdon (Socialist) 0.16% Elba K. Chase (Communist) 0.14%
New Jersey	A. Harry Moore	Democratic	Term-limited, Republican victory	Harold Giles Hoffman (Republican) 49.90% William L. Dill (Democratic) 49.00% Herman F. Niessner (Socialist) 0.64% Morris M. Brown (Communist) 0.21% Leslie E. Molineaux (Prohibition) 0.11% George E. Bopp (Socialist Labor) 0.08% Charles H. Ingersoll (Independent) 0.04%
New Mexico	Andrew W. Hockenhull	Democratic	Retired, Democratic victory	Clyde Tingley (Democratic) 51.90% Jaffa Miller (Republican) 47.60% E. E. Frost (Socialist) 0.42% Philip Howe (Communist) 0.09%
New York	Herbert H. Lehman	Democratic	Re-elected, 57.77%	Robert Moses (Republican) 36.57% Charles Solomon (Socialist) 3.32% Israel Amter (Communist) 1.20% William Frederick Varney (Law Preservation) 0.54% John F. Hylan (Recovery) (write-in) 0.41% Aaron M. Orange (Socialist Labor) 0.19%
North Dakota	Ole H. Olson	Republican	Retired to run for Lieutenant Governor, Democratic victory	Thomas H. Moodie (Democratic) 52.98% Lydia Cady Langer (Republican) 46.61% Pat J. Barrett (Communist) 0.41%
Ohio	George White	Democratic	Retired to run for U.S. Senate, Democratic victory	Martin L. Davey (Democratic) 51.13% Clarence J. Brown (Republican) 48.14% I. O. Ford (Communist) 0.73%
Oklahoma	William H. Murray	Democratic	Term-limited, Democratic victory	Ernest W. Marland (Democratic) 58.25% William B. Pine (Republican) 38.81% S. P. Green (Socialist) 2.66% Francis M. Simpson (Independent) 0.23% Scattering 0.05%
Oregon	Julius L. Meier	Independent	Retired, Democratic victory	Charles H. Martin (Democratic) 38.57% Peter C. Zimmerman (Independent) 31.57% Joe E. Dunne (Republican) 28.73% Harry J. Correll (Independent) 0.49% Abraham M. Silverman (Independent) 0.46% Hank E. Wirth (Independent) 0.18%
Pennsylvania	Gifford Pinchot	Republican	Retired, Democratic victory	George H. Earle (Democratic) 50.04% William A. Schnader (Republican) 47.79% Jesse H. Holmes (Socialist) 1.44% Herbert T. Ames (Prohibition) 0.46% Emmett Patrick Cush (Communist) 0.19% Bess Gyekis (Industrial Labor) 0.08%
Rhode Island	Theodore F. Green	Democratic	Re-elected, 56.62%	Luke H. Callan (Republican) 42.44% Joseph M. Coldwell (Socialist) 0.94%
South Carolina	Ibra Charles Blackwood	Democratic	Term-limited, Democratic victory	Olin Johnston (Democratic) 100.00% (Democratic primary run-off results); Olin Johnston 56.20% Coleman L. Blease 43.80%
South Dakota	Tom Berry	Democratic	Re-elected, 58.60%	William C. Allen (Republican) 40.65% Knute Walstad (Independent) 0.75%
Tennessee	Hill McAlister	Democratic	Re-elected, 61.78%	Lewis S. Pope (Independent) 38.22%
Texas	Miriam A. Ferguson	Democratic	Retired, Democratic victory	James V. Allred (Democratic) 96.44% D. E. W aggoner (Republican) 3.08% George C. Edwards (Socialist) 0.42% Enoch Hardaway (Communist) 0.06%
Vermont	Stanley C. Wilson	Republican	Retired, Republican victory	Charles Manley Smith (Republican) 57.26% James Patrick Leamy (Democratic) 42.13% John G. Hutton (Socialist) 0.47% Thomas Alexander Boyd (Communist) 0.14%
Wisconsin	Albert George Schmedeman	Democratic	Defeated, 37.69%	Philip La Follette (Progressive) 39.12% Howard T. Greene (Republican) 18.14% George A. Nelson (Socialist) 4.68% Morris Childs (Ind. Communist) 0.26% Thomas W. North (Ind. Prohibition) 0.09% Joseph Ehrhardt (Ind. Socialist Labor) 0.04%
Wyoming	Leslie A. Miller	Democratic	Re-elected, 57.91%	Alonzo M. Clark (Republican) 41.37% Louis Sky (Socialist) 0.56% Merton Willer (Communist) 0.17%

== See also ==
- 1934 United States elections
  - 1934 United States Senate elections
  - 1934 United States House of Representatives elections
