= James G. Connolly =

American politician from Rhode Island (1886–1952)

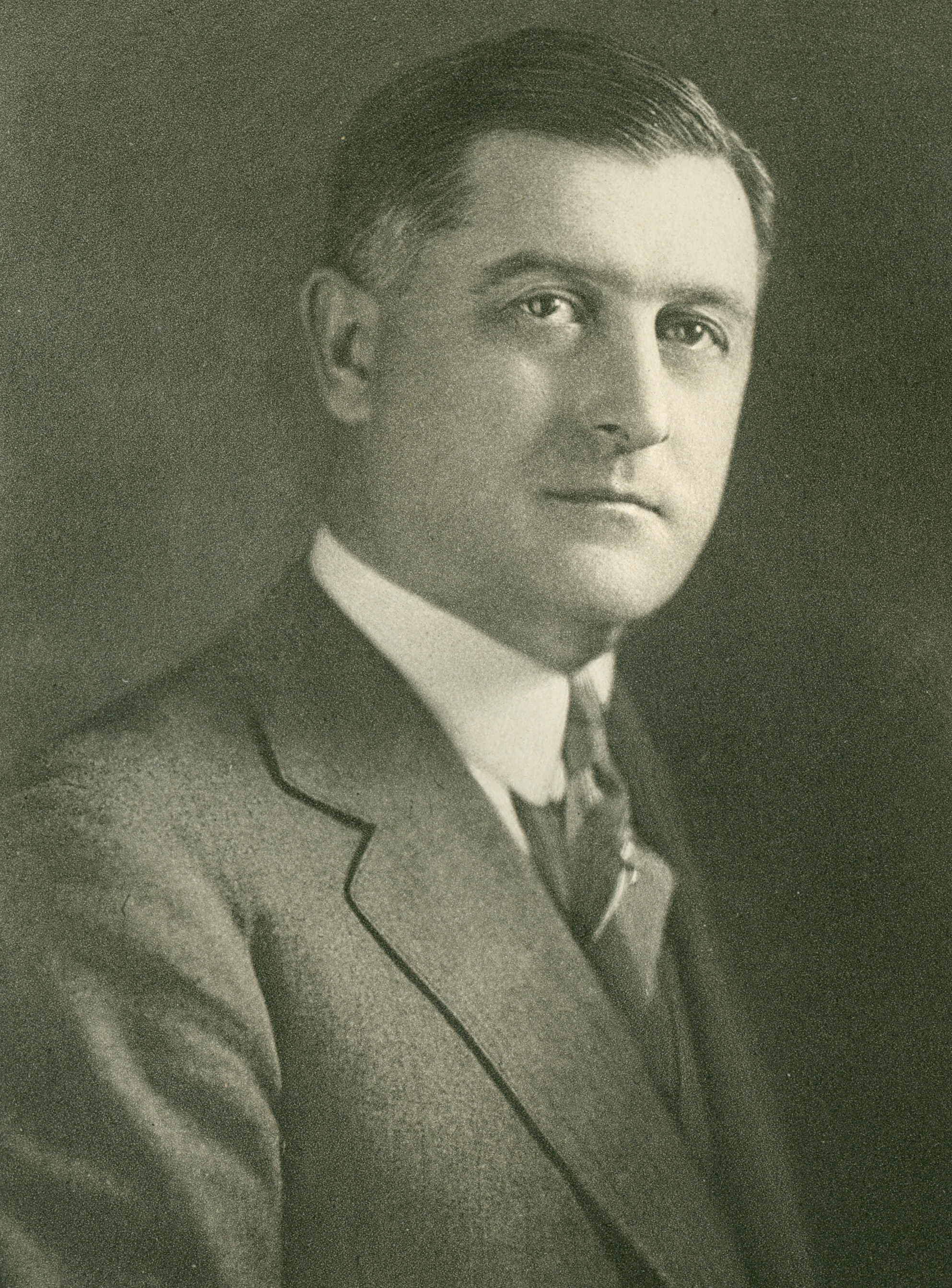

49th Lieutenant Governor of Rhode Island
- In office January 3, 1929 – January 3, 1933
- Governor: Norman S. Case
- Preceded by: Norman S. Case
- Succeeded by: Robert E. Quinn

Personal details
- Born: March 28, 1886 River Point, Rhode Island, U.S.
- Died: August 31, 1952 (aged 66) Digby, Nova Scotia, Canada
- Party: Republican
- Education: Brown University & Harvard Law School

James Greenan Connolly (March 28, 1886 – August 31, 1952) was an American politician who served as the 49th Lieutenant Governor of Rhode Island as a member of the Republican Party from 1929 to 1933.

To date, Connolly is the last Republican to be elected Lieutenant Governor of Rhode Island for more than one term.

== Early life ==
James G. Connolly was born in River Point, Rhode Island on March 28, 1886. After graduating from Brown University in 1909 and Harvard Law School in 1912, he became a lawyer.

== Political career ==
James G. Connolly was first elected to office as Lieutenant Governor of Rhode Island alongside Governor Norman S. Case on November 6, 1928, winning with 51.49% of the vote. He took office on January 3, 1929, and the duo were re-elected on November 4, 1930 with 50.53% of the vote. In their bid for a third term on November 8, 1932, the pair struck short with only 43.50% of the vote, losing the election. Connolly completed his second term on January 3, 1933, and was succeeded by newly elected democrat Robert E. Quinn.

== Later life and death ==
Upon reaching the end of his term after his election loss on January 3, 1933, James G. Connolly retired from politics. Connolly died in Digby, Nova Scotia, Canada, on August 31, 1952. He lies buried at Saint Francis Cemetery in Pawtucket, Rhode Island.

== See also ==
- List of lieutenant governors of Rhode Island

Political offices
| Preceded by Norman S. Case | Lieutenant Governor of Rhode Island; 1929-1933 | Succeeded by Robert E. Quinn |
