= 1936 United States Senate election in Kansas =

- November 3, 1936
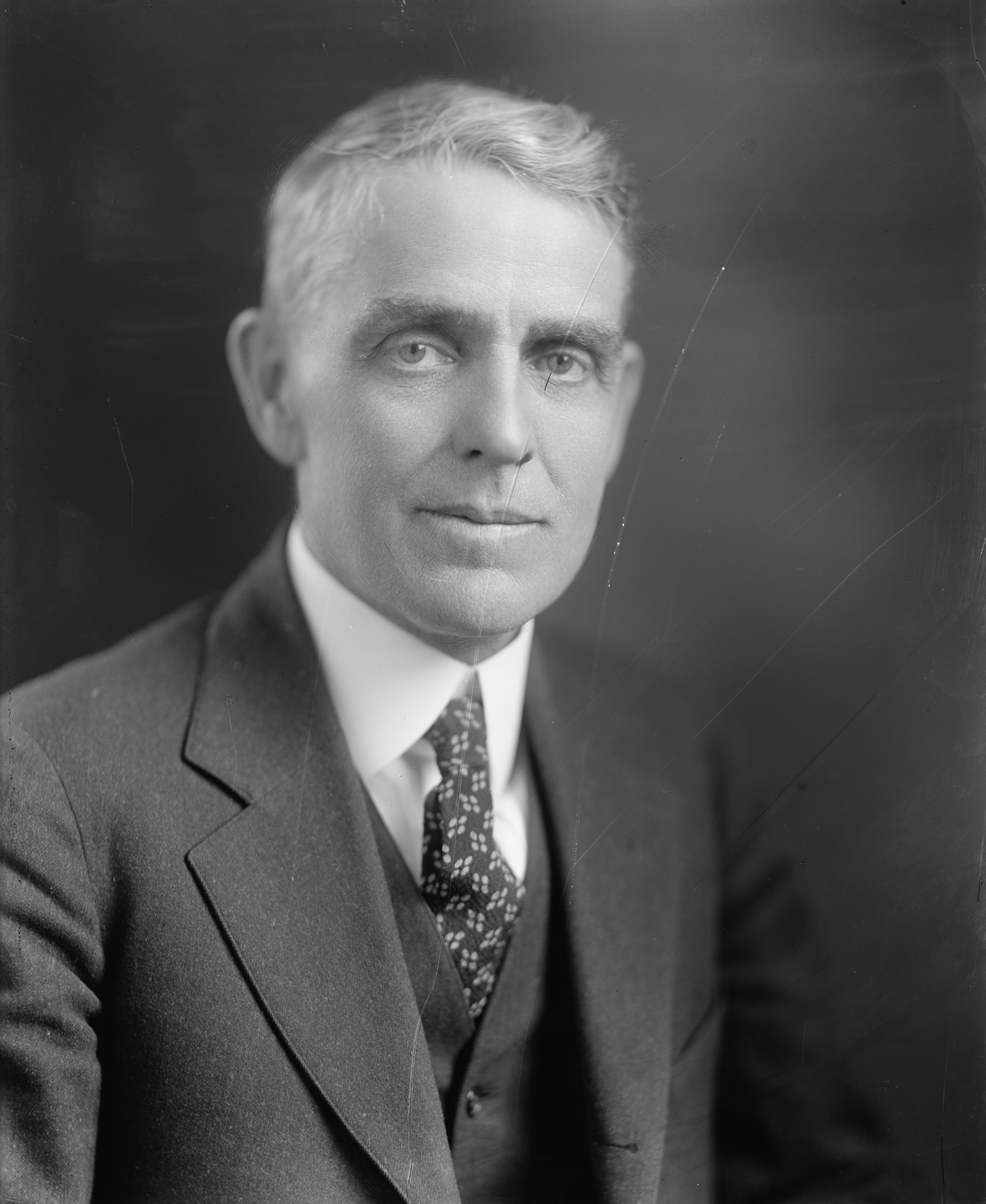

Nominee	Arthur Capper	Omar B. Ketchum
Party	Republican	Democratic
Popular vote	417,873	386,685
Percentage	51.63%	47.78%
- County results Capper: 40–50% 50–60% 60–70% Ketchum: 40–50% 50–60% 60–70%
U.S. senator before election
Arthur Capper
Republican
Elected U.S. Senator
Arthur Capper
Republican

The 1936 United States Senate election in Kansas took place on November 3, 1936. Incumbent Republican Senator Arthur Capper ran for re-election to a fourth term. He was challenged by former Wichita Mayor Omar Ketchum, the 1934 Democratic nominee for Governor. Even though Kansas Governor Alf Landon was the Republican nominee against President Franklin D. Roosevelt in the 1936 presidential election, Roosevelt won Kansas by a wide margin over Landon, and Capper only narrowly defeated Ketchum.

== Democratic primary ==
=== Candidates ===
- Omar B. Ketchum, former Mayor of Wichita, 1934 Democratic nominee for Governor
- Dempster O. Potts, Wichita attorney
- Robert George, Lebo stockman
- John H. Arnett, 1934 Democratic nominee for Kansas's 1st congressional district

=== Results ===
Democratic primary results
Party	Candidate	Votes	%
Democratic	Omar B. Ketchum	103,083	68.08%
Democratic	Dempster O. Potts	31,717	20.95%
Democratic	Robert George	10,170	6.72%
Democratic	John H. Arnett	6,451	4.26%
Total votes		151,421	100.00%

== Republican primary ==
=== Candidates ===
- Arthur Capper, incumbent U.S. Senator
- H. L. Stout, Fort Scott real estate dealer
- Walter C. Neibarger, publisher of the Tonganoxie Mirror

=== Results ===
Republican primary results
Party	Candidate	Votes	%
Republican	Arthur Capper (inc.)	200,643	76.05%
Republican	H. L. Stout	32,691	12.39%
Republican	Walter C. Neibarger	30,508	11.56%
Total votes		263,842	100.00%

== General election ==
=== Results ===
1936 United States Senate election in Kansas
Party	Candidate	Votes	%	±%
Republican	Arthur Capper (inc.)	417,873	51.00%	−10.09%
Democratic	Omar B. Ketchum	396,685	48.41%	+9.51%
Socialist	T. C. Hager	4,775	0.58%	—
Write-in		35	0.00%	—
Majority		21,188	2.59%	−19.60%
Total votes		819,368	100.00%	
Republican hold				

== See also ==
- 1936 United States Senate elections
