= 1934 Texas lieutenant gubernatorial election =

- November 6, 1934
Nominee	Walter Frank Woodul
Party	Democratic
Popular vote	428,393
Percentage	96.73%
Lieutenant Governor before election
Edgar E. Witt
Democratic
Elected Lieutenant Governor
Walter Frank Woodul
Democratic

The 1934 Texas lieutenant gubernatorial election was held on November 6, 1934, in order to elect the lieutenant governor of Texas. Democratic nominee and incumbent member of the Texas Senate Walter Frank Woodul defeated Republican nominee Lester Gunst and Socialist nominee E. M. Lane.

== General election ==
On election day, November 6, 1934, Democratic nominee Walter Frank Woodul won the election by a margin of 416,018 votes against his foremost opponent Republican nominee Lester Gunst, thereby retaining Democratic control over the office of lieutenant governor. Woodul was sworn in as the 30th lieutenant governor of Texas on January 15, 1935.

=== Results ===
Texas lieutenant gubernatorial election, 1934
Party	Candidate	Votes	%
Democratic	Walter Frank Woodul	428,393	96.73
Republican	Lester Gunst	12,375	2.79
Socialist	E. M. Lane	1,807	0.41
	Scattering	299	0.07
Total votes		442,874	100.00
Democratic hold			
