= Edward Roscoe Meek =

American judge

Senior Judge of the United States District Court for the Northern District of Texas
- In office December 31, 1935 – April 10, 1939

Judge of the United States District Court for the Northern District of Texas
- In office July 13, 1898 – December 31, 1935
- Appointed by: William McKinley
- Preceded by: Seat established by 30 Stat. 240
- Succeeded by: Thomas Whitfield Davidson

Personal details
- Born: Edward Roscoe Meek; December 23, 1865 Davenport, Iowa, U.S.
- Died: April 10, 1939 (aged 73) Santa Monica, California, U.S.
- Education: University of Iowa (A.B., A.M.); University of Iowa College of Law (LL.B.)

Edward Roscoe Meek (December 23, 1865 – April 10, 1939) was a United States district judge of the United States District Court for the Northern District of Texas.

== Education and career ==
Born in Davenport, Iowa, Meek received an Artium Baccalaureus degree from the University of Iowa in 1887, a Bachelor of Laws from the University of Iowa College of Law in 1889, and an Artium Magister degree from the University of Iowa in 1891. He was in private practice in Fort Worth, Texas from 1889 to 1898.

== Federal judicial service ==
Meek received a recess appointment from President William McKinley on July 13, 1898, to the United States District Court for the Northern District of Texas, to a new seat authorized by 30 Stat. 240. He was nominated to the same position by President McKinley on December 13, 1898. He was confirmed by the United States Senate on February 15, 1899, and received his commission the same day. He assumed senior status on December 31, 1935. His service terminated on April 10, 1939, due to his death in Santa Monica, California. Meek was McKinley's longest serving judicial appointee and the last in active service.

== See also ==
- List of United States federal judges by longevity of service

== Sources ==
Legal offices
Preceded by Seat established by 30 Stat. 240	Judge of the United States District Court for the Northern District of Texas; 1898–1935	Succeeded by Thomas Whitfield Davidson
