= Barry Miller (politician) =

American politician (1864–1933)

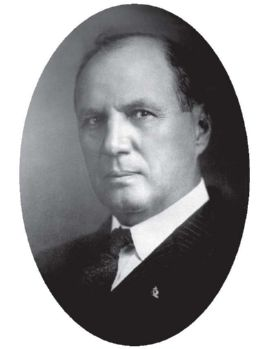

28th Lieutenant Governor of Texas
- In office January 20, 1925 – January 20, 1931
- Governor: Miriam A. Ferguson; Dan Moody
- Preceded by: Thomas Whitfield Davidson
- Succeeded by: Edgar E. Witt

Member of the Texas House of Representatives from the 44th district
- In office January 9, 1917 – January 9, 1923

Member of the Texas Senate from the 6th district
- In office January 10, 1899 – January 13, 1903
- Preceded by: Oliver P. Bowser
- Succeeded by: William Cooper McKamy

Personal details
- Born: December 25, 1864 Barnwell, South Carolina, C.S.
- Died: June 20, 1933 (aged 68) Dallas County, Texas, U.S.
- Party: Democratic
- Spouse: Minerva Hortense Miller (m. 1885)

Barry Miller (December 25, 1864 – June 20, 1933) was an American politician who was the 28th lieutenant governor of Texas from 1925 to 1931, serving under governors Miriam A. Ferguson and Dan Moody. A member of the Democratic Party, he served in the Texas Senate from 1899 to 1903 and the Texas House of Representatives from 1917 to 1923.

== Early life ==
Miller was born on December 25, 1864, in Barnwell, South Carolina, the son of Dr. Thomas Johnson Miller and Rachel Barry. After his father, a physician educated at the Medical College of Philadelphia and a medical officer in the Carolina Dragoons, was killed in the American Civil War, Miller left for Washington, D.C. As a young boy, Miller worked there as a printer's devil for the Washington Post, and later worked as a page in the United States Senate, meeting many national leaders of the era. Eventually, Miller traveled west to Dallas, where he studied law in the firm of Robertson & Coke. Miller met Minerva Hortense Miller, daughter of prominent early Dallasite William Brown Miller, at Dallas' inaugural debutante ball, the Idlewild Ball, in 1883. Barry Miller married Minnie Miller (no relation) in 1885, eventually residing at his wife's family home, now called Millermore.

== Political career ==
Miller was a lawyer and was elected as a Democratic Texas state Senator in 1899 representing Dallas County. He served four terms and was chosen President Pro Tempore of the Senate in the Twenty-seventh Legislature.

Miller served as campaign manager for U.S. Senator Charles A. Culberson, and was elected to the Texas Senate in 1898 to support Culberson's candidacy. As a State Senator in 1901, Miller authored and sponsored Senate Concurrent Resolution 10, which made the bluebonnet the Texas State flower. He did so as a gesture of respect to the wife of longtime Texas lawyer, Sawnie Robertson, in whose firm Miller read law when he first came to Texas. Mrs. Robertson had always remarked that the bluebonnet was her favorite flower. In 1911, he was appointed a Judge of the Criminal District Court in Dallas County and Miller was reelected in 1915. In 1916, Miller was elected to a vacant State Representative seat in Dallas as a Democrat. Miller was a vocal opponent of the Ku Klux Klan. He was also an early opponent of women's suffrage in Texas. However, he changed his mind when the Dallas Equal Suffrage Association (DESA) provided over 10,000 signatures from Dallas women supporting suffrage. He even became the chair of the woman suffrage caucus.

Defeated for reelection in 1922, Miller ran for Lieutenant Governor along with other Anti-Klan candidates, Miriam A. Ferguson for Governor and Dan Moody for Attorney General in 1924 and the ticket was overwhelmingly elected in the Democratic Party primary run-off. Miller was re-elected as Lieutenant Governor in 1926 and 1928, and to date, is one of only three men to ever be elected to three terms as Lieutenant Governor of Texas.

In 1930, Miller was an unsuccessful candidate for Governor of Texas, losing the Democratic nomination in a very crowded field to Houston oilman Ross Sterling.

Miller died on June 20, 1933, at Millermore in Dallas County, and is buried in the Miller family cemetery in Dallas.

Party political offices
Preceded by Thomas Whitfield Davidson	Democratic nominee for Lieutenant Governor of Texas; 1924, 1926, 1928	Succeeded by Edgar E. Witt
Texas Senate
Preceded by O. P. Bowser	Texas State Senator from District 6 (Dallas); 1899 - 1903	Succeeded by W. C. McKamy
Texas House of Representatives
Preceded by Dwight Lewelling	Member of the Texas House of Representatives from District 44 (Dallas); 1917-1923	Succeeded by unknown
Political offices
Preceded by Thomas Whitfield Davidson	Lieutenant Governor of Texas; 1925–1931	Succeeded by Edgar E. Witt
