= 1954 United States Senate election in Rhode Island =

- November 2, 1954
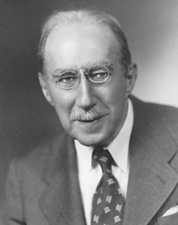

Nominee	Theodore F. Green	Walter I. Sundlun
Party	Democratic	Republican
Popular vote	193,654	132,970
Percentage	59.29%	40.71%
- Green: 50–60% 60–70% Sundlun: 50–60% 60–70%
U.S. senator before election
Theodore F. Green
Democratic
Elected U.S. Senator
Theodore F. Green
Democratic

The 1954 United States Senate election in Rhode Island took place on November 2, 1954. Incumbent Democratic U.S. Senator Theodore F. Green was re-elected to a fourth term in office.

== Primary elections ==
The Democratic primary was held on September 20, 1954, and the Republican primary was held on September 29, 1954.

=== Democratic primary ===
==== Candidate ====
- Theodore F. Green, incumbent U.S. Senator

==== Results ====
Democratic primary results
Party	Candidate	Votes	%
Democratic	Theodore F. Green (incumbent)	unopposed	

=== Republican primary ===
==== Candidate ====
- Walter I. Sundlun, attorney

==== Results ====
Republican primary results
Party	Candidate	Votes	%
Republican	Walter I. Sundlun	unopposed	

== General election ==
=== Results ===
General election results
Party	Candidate	Votes	%
Democratic	Theodore F. Green (incumbent)	193,654	59.29
Republican	Walter I. Sundlun	132,970	40.71
Majority		60,684	18.58
Turnout		326,624	
Democratic hold			

== Bibliography ==
- Congressional Elections, 1946-1996. Washington, D.C.: Congressional Quarterly Inc. 1998. ISBN 1-56802-248-4.
- Official Count of the Ballots Cast for United States Senator, Representatives in Congress, General Officers, and Senators and Representatives in the General Assembly etc (PDF). Board of Elections of Rhode Island. 1954.
