= 1934 Southern Rhodesian sweepstakes referendum =

← 1922	28 February 1934	1953 →

Are you in favour of sweepstakes under strict legislative control being permitted to operate in Southern Rhodesia?
For	82.46%
Against	17.54%

"If sweepstakes be legalised, are you in favour of (a) Management by the Government direct? or (b) Management by a special authority under Government licence?
Government	70.11%
Special authority	28.89%

In February 1934, the voters of Southern Rhodesia voted in a referendum to permit the running of sweepstakes gambling "under strict legislative control", managed by the government of the colony.

== Background ==
The Lotteries Prohibition Act 1891 made lotteries illegal in Southern Rhodesia, but it became increasingly common for Rhodesians to participate in sweepstakes conducted outside the colony and it was felt among the political class that a measure of reform on the issue was overdue. The case for legalising sweepstakes had been raised in the Southern Rhodesia Assembly from 1928, and in the general election of 1933 the Reform Party stated in its manifesto that it would submit the issue to a referendum should it be elected.

== Arrangements ==
No specific act was passed to authorise the referendum; instead the Government Statistician was instructed to conduct the ballot, which was conducted entirely through postal voting with no polling stations being open. All those registered to vote were sent a ballot paper at the beginning of February, with a calendar month to respond (the ballot closed on 28 February). There were two separate issues on the ballot paper, which read:

1. Are you in favour of sweepstakes under strict legislative control being permitted to operate in Southern Rhodesia?

2. If sweepstakes be legalised, are you in favour of –

(a) Management by the Government direct?

or

(b) Management by a special authority under Government licence?

== Results ==
There were 28,216 ballot papers dispatched, of which 20,550 were returned, making a turnout of 72.8%. The majority in favour of legalising sweepstakes was an overwhelming one of more than four to one. The voters then approved management by the Government direct, by a slightly more than two-thirds majority, although the Statistician discounted some 1,036 votes on the second question who had given contradictory answers "which made it impossible to determine what their views on management were". 203 ballot papers were blank on the second question.

Following the result of the referendum, the House of Assembly passed the State Lotteries Act on 14 May 1935 which legalised sweepstakes under Government control.

First question	Votes	%
In favour of sweepstakes	16,946	82.5
Against sweepstakes	3,604	17.5
Second question	Votes	%
In favour of management by Government	13,539	70.1
In favour of management by special authority	5,772	29.9

=== Question 1 ===
Electoral district	Papers dispatched	Valid votes	Turnout %	In favour	%	Against	%
Bulawayo Central	2,058	1,370	66.6	1,198	87.4	172	12.6
Bulawayo North	2,027	1,445	71.3	1,066	73.8	379	26.2
Bulawayo South	1,343	850	63.3	723	85.1	127	14.9
Charter	687	475	69.1	382	80.4	93	19.6
Eastern	941	698	74.2	541	77.5	157	22.5
Gatooma	851	665	78.1	581	87.4	84	12.6
Gwanda	851	665	72.8	464	87.9	64	12.1
Gwelo	1,068	776	72.7	674	86.9	102	13.1
Hartley	633	525	82.9	429	81.7	96	18.3
Insiza	722	550	76.2	482	87.6	68	12.4
Inyati	791	566	71.6	483	85.3	83	14.7
Lomagundi	840	665	79.2	504	75.8	161	24.2
Marandellas	825	640	77.6	517	80.8	123	19.2
Matopo	952	726	76.3	617	85.0	109	15.0
Mazoe	901	703	78.0	581	82.6	122	17.4
Que Que	829	636	76.7	583	91.7	53	8.3
Raylton	1,259	849	67.4	757	89.2	92	10.8
Salisbury Central	2,290	1,601	69.9	1,359	84.9	242	15.1
Salisbury District	996	781	78.4	584	74.8	197	25.2
Salisbury North	2,043	1,501	73.5	1,027	68.4	474	31.6
Salisbury South	1,258	843	67.0	742	88.0	101	12.0
Selukwe	835	681	81.6	598	87.8	83	12.2
Umtali North	908	672	74.0	521	77.5	151	22.5
Umtali South	802	580	72.3	523	90.2	57	9.8
Victoria	1,024	715	69.8	537	75.1	178	24.9
Wankie	708	509	71.9	473	92.9	36	7.1

=== Question 2 ===
Electoral district	Contradictory votes	Blank votes	Government management	%	Special authority	%
Bulawayo Central	49	7	782	59.5	532	40.5
Bulawayo North	50	9	933	67.3	453	32.7
Bulawayo South	20	5	502	60.8	323	39.2
Charter	47	13	357	86.0	58	14.0
Eastern	62	18	477	77.2	141	22.8
Gatooma	29	4	478	75.6	154	24.4
Gwanda	18	7	377	75.0	126	25.0
Gwelo	50	2	554	76.5	170	23.5
Hartley	29	7	377	77.1	112	22.9
Insiza	30	8	414	80.9	98	19.1
Inyati	26	4	369	68.8	167	31.2
Lomagundi	41	8	423	68.7	193	31.3
Marandellas	40	11	457	77.6	132	22.4
Matopo	32	9	398	58.1	287	41.9
Mazoe	32	12	485	73.6	174	26.4
Que Que	39	1	394	66.1	202	33.9
Raylton	37	3	491	60.7	318	39.3
Salisbury Central	53	14	978	63.8	556	36.2
Salisbury District	50	9	543	75.2	179	24.8
Salisbury North	72	10	1,022	72.0	397	28.0
Salisbury South	37	8	539	67.5	259	32.5
Selukwe	36	4	514	80.2	127	19.8
Umtali North	40	9	443	71.1	180	28.9
Umtali South	24	4	413	74.8	139	25.2
Victoria	67	14	495	78.1	139	21.9
Wankie	26	3	324	67.5	156	32.5
