= 1953 Southern Rhodesian federation referendum =

- 9 April 1953

Results
Choice	Votes	%
Yes	25,570	63.45%
No	14,729	36.55%
Valid votes	40,299	99.27%
Invalid or blank votes	295	0.73%
Total votes	40,594	100.00%
Registered voters/turnout	49,068	82.73%

A referendum on the formation of the Federation of Rhodesia and Nyasaland was held in Southern Rhodesia on 9 April 1953. The proposal was approved by 63.45% of voters.

== Results ==
Choice	Votes	%
For	25,570	63.45
Against	14,729	36.55
Invalid/blank votes	295	–
Total	40,594	100
Registered voters/turnout	49,068	82.73
Source: Direct Democracy
