= 1934 Nicaraguan parliamentary election =

Parliamentary elections were held in Nicaragua on 7 October 1934 to elect half of the seats in the Chamber of Deputies and one-third of the seats in the Senate of the National Congress.

== Results ==
Party	Seats	
Party	Chamber	Senate
Liberal Party	30	17
Conservative Party	13	7
Total	43	24
Source: Political Handbook of the World
