= Walter Frank Woodul =

American politician

Walter Frank Woodul (September 25, 1892 – October 1, 1984) was an American politician who was an early proponent of a state highway system. He served as the 30th lieutenant governor of Texas from 1935 to 1939, under Governor James V. Allred.

Party political offices
Preceded by Edgar E. Witt	Democratic nominee for Lieutenant Governor of Texas; 1934, 1936	Succeeded by Coke R. Stevenson
Texas House of Representatives
Preceded by Asher Smith	Member of the Texas House of Representatives from District 79 (Laredo); 1917	Succeeded by Edwin Augustus Atlee, Jr.
Texas Senate
Preceded by James W. Hall	Texas State Senator from District 16 (Laredo); 1929–1935	Succeeded by Weaver Moore
Political offices
Preceded by Edgar E. Witt	Lieutenant Governor of Texas; 1935–1939	Succeeded by Coke R. Stevenson
