= 1928 Rhode Island gubernatorial election =

- November 6, 1928
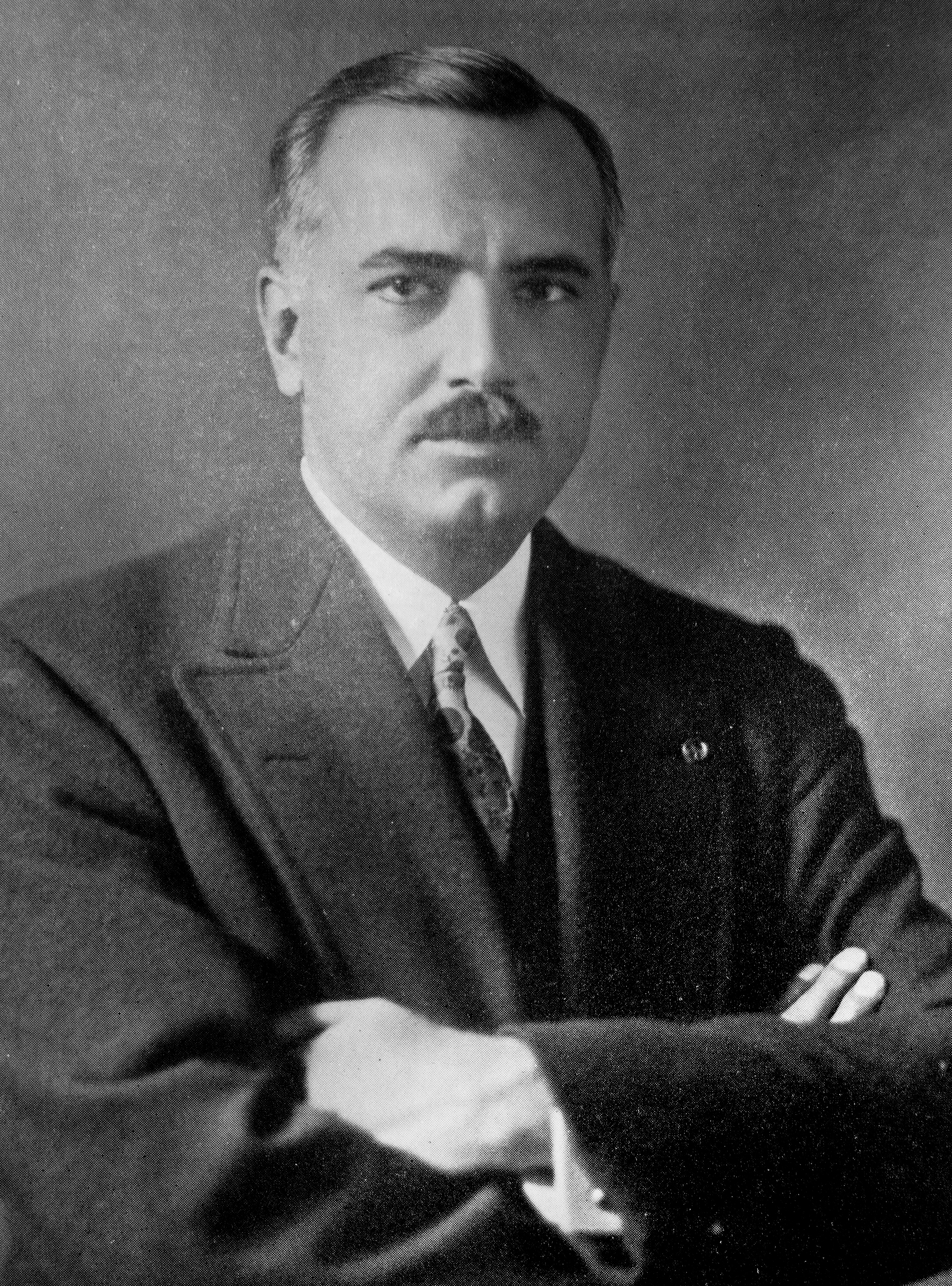

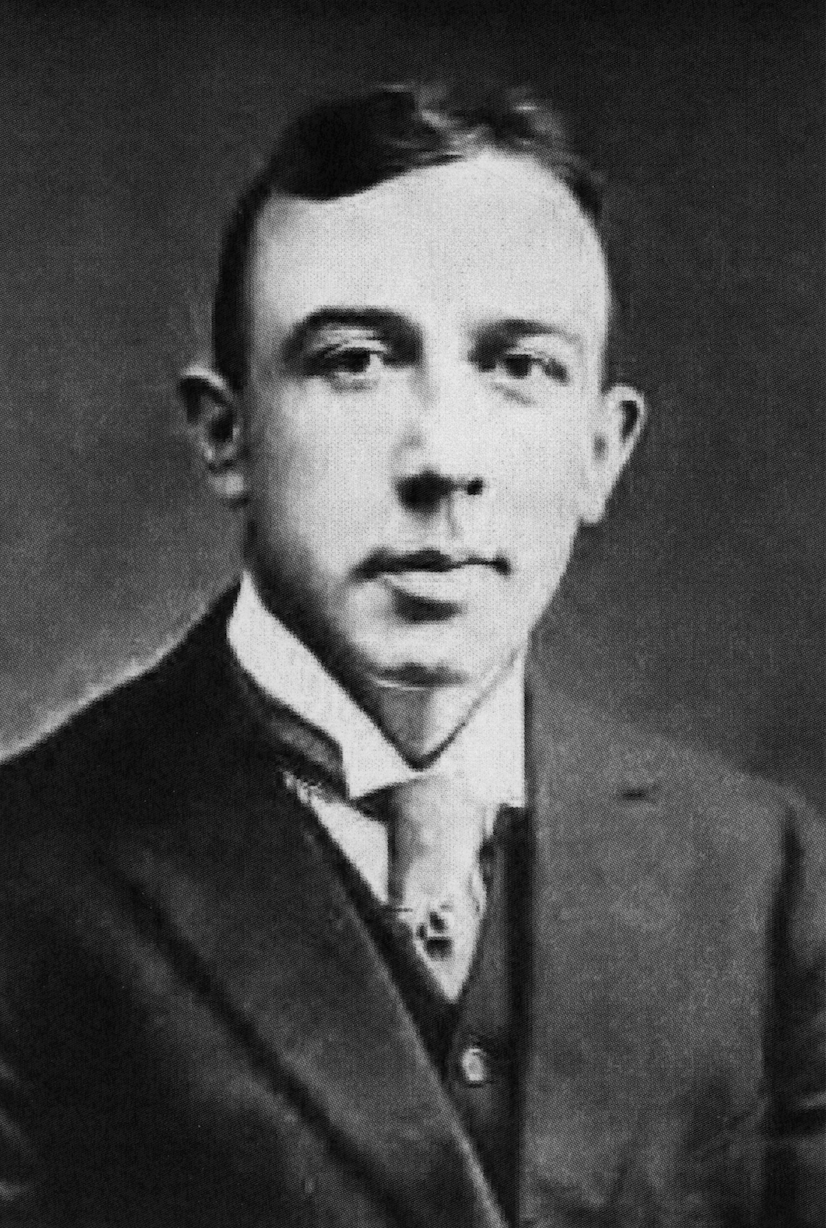
Nominee	Norman S. Case	Alberic A. Archambault
Party	Republican	Democratic
Popular vote	121,748	113,594
Percentage	51.59%	48.13%
- Case: 50–60% 60–70% 70–80% 80–90% Archambault: 50–60% 60–70%
Governor before election
Norman S. Case
Republican
Elected Governor
Norman S. Case
Republican

The 1928 Rhode Island gubernatorial election was held on November 6, 1928. Incumbent Republican Norman S. Case defeated Democratic nominee Alberic A. Archambault with 51.59% of the vote.

== General election ==
=== Candidates ===
Major party candidates

- Norman S. Case, Republican
- Alberic A. Archambault, Democratic

Other candidates

- Charles F. Bishop, Socialist Labor
- Edward W. Theinert, Workers

=== Results ===
1928 Rhode Island gubernatorial election
Party	Candidate	Votes	%	±%
Republican	Norman S. Case (incumbent)	121,748	51.59%	
Democratic	Alberic A. Archambault	113,594	48.13%	
Socialist Labor	Charles F. Bishop	388	0.16%	
Workers	Edward W. Theinert	275	0.12%	
Majority		8,154		
Turnout				
Republican hold		Swing		
