= 1934 Afghan parliamentary election =

- May 1934

All 111 seats in the House of the People

Parliamentary elections were held in Afghanistan in May 1934. The proclamation for elections was issued by king Zahir Shah on 16 February, and the newly elected House of the People was inaugurated on 21 June.

== Electoral system ==
The bicameral parliament consisted of a 111-member House of the People, whose members were elected for three-year terms, and a House of the Notables, whose members were appointed by the king. Of the 111 seats in the House of the People, Kabul elected 26, Kandahar 16, Eastern Province 15, Qataghan and Badakshan 14, Herat 12, Mazar 11, Southern Province 9, Maimana 5 and Farah 3.

Suffrage was granted to men aged over 20, while candidates were required to be literate and aged 25–70. Civil servants were not able to stand for election. In order to vote, voters were required to travel to provincial cities where a public discussion would take place on the candidates. The electoral law required candidates to be elected by "general consent", or if there was a lack of consensus, by plurality vote.

== Results ==
23 of the incumbent members were re-elected.
