= 1932 Rhode Island gubernatorial election =

- November 8, 1932
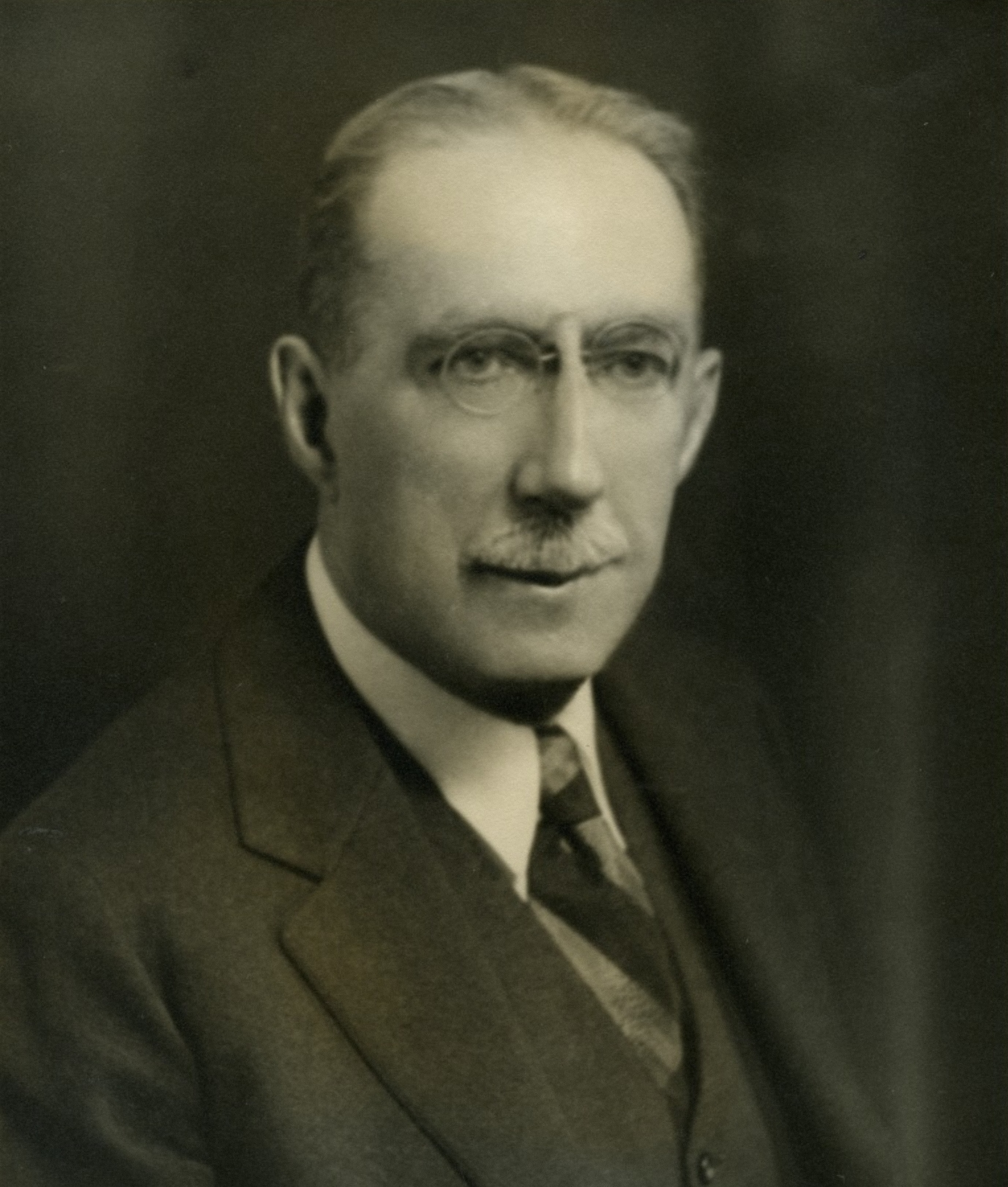

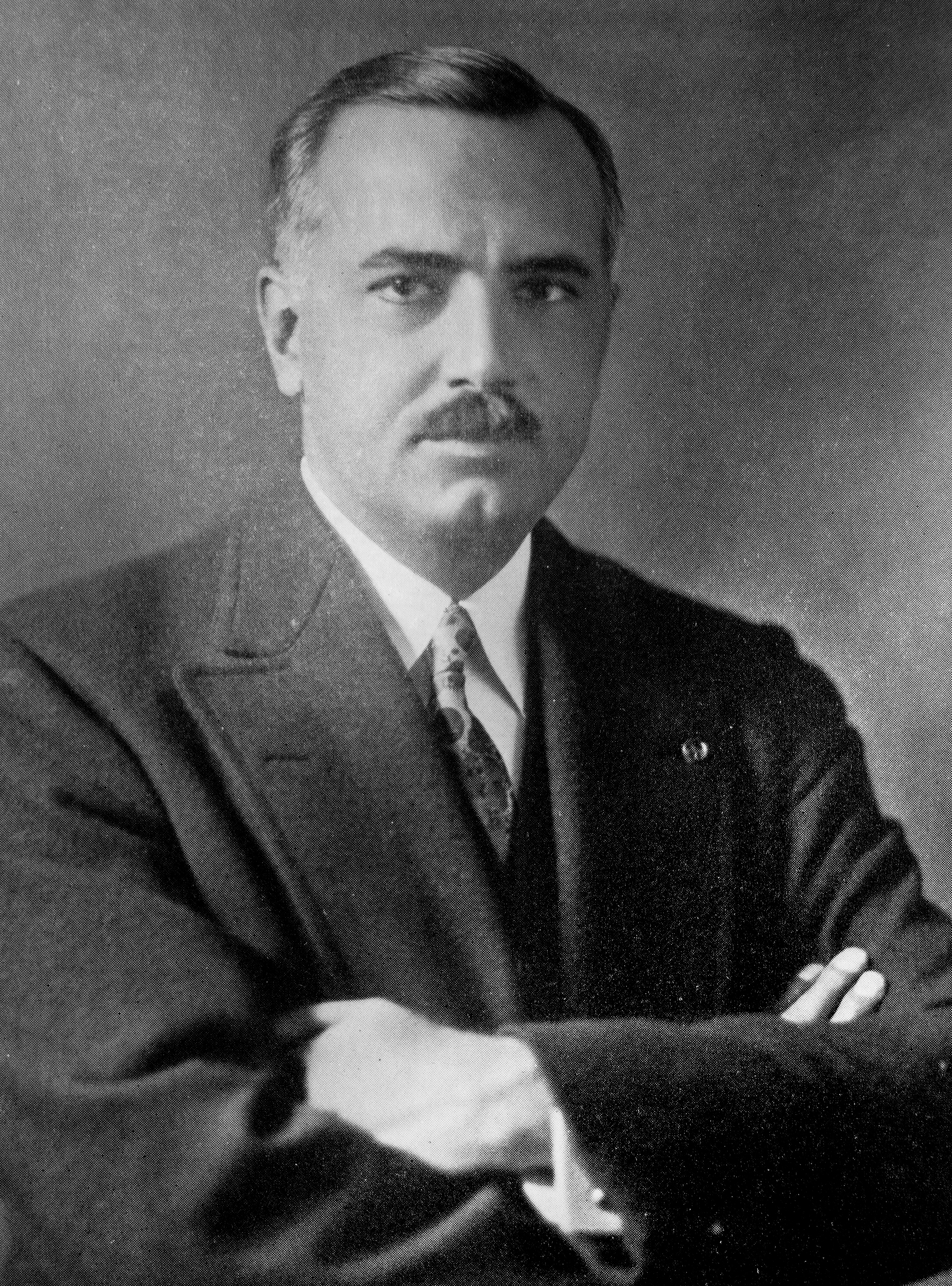
| Nominee | Theodore F. Green | Norman S. Case |
| Party | Democratic | Republican |
| Popular vote | 146,474 | 115,438 |
| Percentage | 55.20% | 43.50% |
- Green: 50–60% 60–70% Case: 50–60% 60–70% 70–80%
Governor before election
Norman S. Case
Republican
Elected Governor
Theodore F. Green
Democratic

The 1932 Rhode Island gubernatorial election was held on November 8, 1932. Democratic nominee Theodore F. Green defeated incumbent Republican Norman S. Case with 55.20% of the vote.

== General election ==
=== Candidates ===
Major party candidates

- Theodore F. Green, Democratic
- Norman S. Case, Republican

Other candidates

- Frederick W. Hurst, Socialist
- James P. Reid, Communist
- Roscoe W. Phillips, Prohibition
- Charles F. Bishop, Socialist Labor

=== Results ===
1932 Rhode Island gubernatorial election
| Party | Candidate | Votes | % | ±% |
|---|---|---|---|---|
| Democratic | Theodore F. Green | 146,474 | 55.20% | |
| Republican | Norman S. Case (incumbent) | 115,438 | 43.50% | |
| Socialist | Frederick W. Hurst | 1,949 | 0.73% | |
| Communist | James P. Reid | 549 | 0.21% | |
| Prohibition | Roscoe W. Phillips | 503 | 0.19% | |
| Socialist Labor | Charles F. Bishop | 441 | 0.17% | |
| Majority | | 31,036 | | |
| Turnout | | | | |
| Democratic gain from Republican | | Swing | | |
