= Norman S. Case =

American politician (1888–1967)

Norman Case
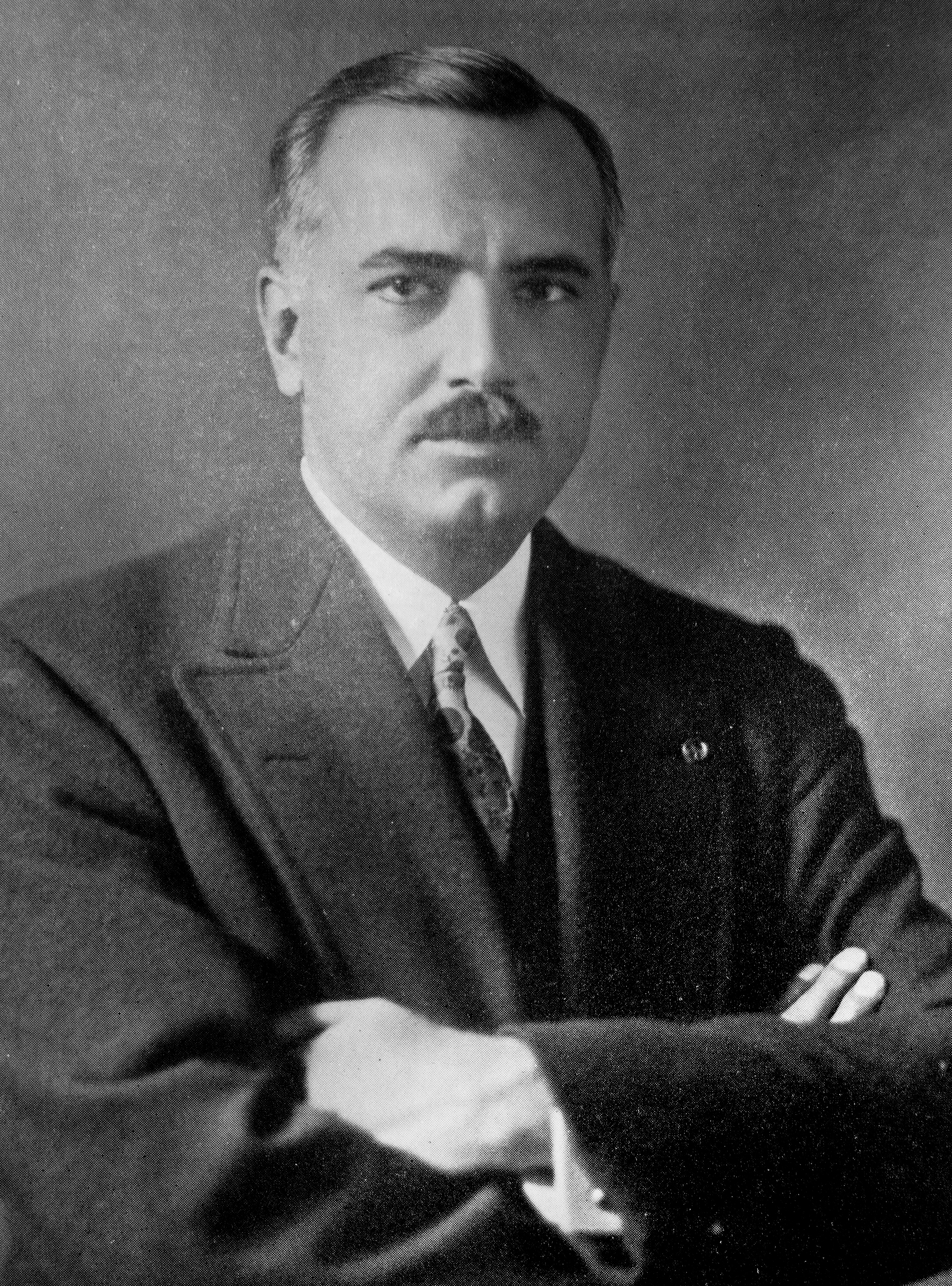

Commissioner of the Federal Communications Commission
- In office July 11, 1934 – June 30, 1945
- President: Franklin D. Roosevelt; Harry S. Truman
- Preceded by: Position established
- Succeeded by: William Wills

Chair of the National Governors Association
- In office July 2, 1930 – April 27, 1932
- Preceded by: George Dern
- Succeeded by: John Garland Pollard

56th Governor of Rhode Island
- In office February 4, 1928 – January 3, 1933
- Lieutenant: James G. Connelly
- Preceded by: Aram J. Pothier
- Succeeded by: Theodore F. Green

Lieutenant Governor of Rhode Island
- In office January 1927 – February 4, 1928
- Governor: Aram J. Pothier
- Preceded by: Nathaniel W. Smith
- Succeeded by: James G. Connelly

Personal details
- Born: Norman Stanley Case; October 11, 1888 Providence, Rhode Island, U.S.
- Died: October 9, 1967 (aged 78) Wakefield, Rhode Island, U.S.
- Resting place: Swan Point Cemetery; Providence, Rhode Island
- Party: Republican
- Spouse: Emma Arnold
- Children: 3
- Education: Brown University (BA); Harvard University; Boston University (LLB)
- Awards: Order of the Black Star
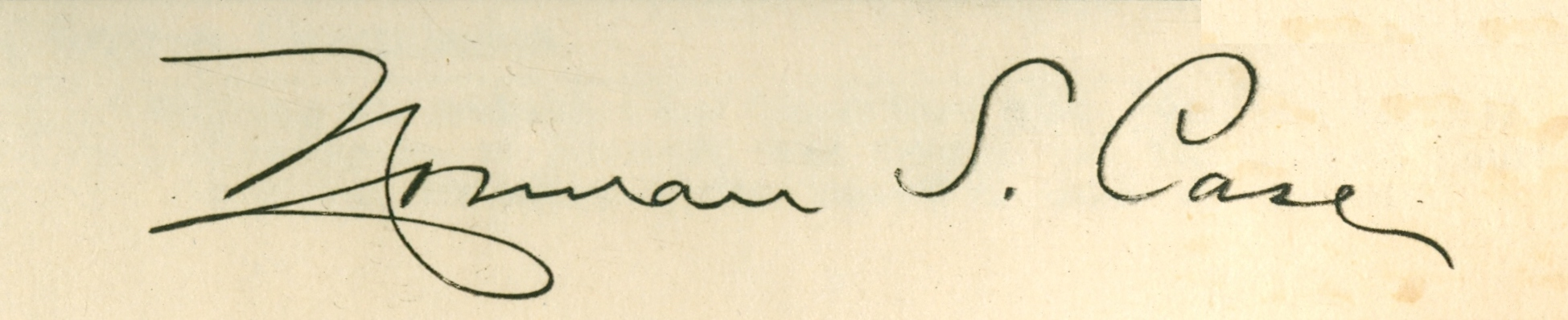
- Signature

Military service
- Allegiance: United States
- Branch/service: Rhode Island National Guard
- Battles/wars: World War I

Norman Stanley Case (October 11, 1888 – October 9, 1967) was an American politician who served as the lieutenant governor of Rhode Island from 1927 to 1928 and the 56th governor of Rhode Island from 1928 to 1933. He also served in the Army during World War I and was the U.S. district attorney for Rhode Island from 1921 to 1926. Case was a member of the Republican Party during his entire time in office. He was a member of the General Society of Mayflower Descendants. He was also an active member of the Freemasons and was a Baptist. He died on October 9, 1967, in Wakefield, Rhode Island, two days shy of his 79th birthday.

== Early life and career ==
Case was born in Providence, Rhode Island, to John Warren Case and Louise Marea (White) Case. He attended Brown University, graduating in 1908, and went on to Harvard Law School. He left Harvard for Boston University Law School, from which he received his law degree in 1912.

Case opened a law practice in Providence and was soon elected to the Providence City Council as a Republican. Case was married on June 28, 1916, to Emma Louise Arnold.

== Military service ==
A member of the Rhode Island National Guard, Case was called to active duty on June 14, 1916 and served on the Mexican border as captain of Troop A of the 1st Cavalry Squadron until the unit was mustered out of Federal service in November. Shortly after the United States entered World War I in April 1917, Captain Case and his troop were mustered into Federal service on July 25. On August 20, Case's troop was re-organized as Company A of the 103d Machine Gun Battalion which was assigned to the 26th Division.

He sailed for Europe on October 2 and served in France with his unit. He was reassigned as Judge Advocate of the 26th Division on January 1, 1918 and as Assistant Provost Marshal for the Services of Supply on February 13. He was reassigned to the administrative section of the Headquarters of the Services of Supply on August 11 and to the supply section on April 20, 1919.

He returned to the United States on July 17, 1919 and was discharged two days later. He was awarded the Order of the Black Star of Benin by the French government in recognition of his service. Case remained a city councilor during his military service.

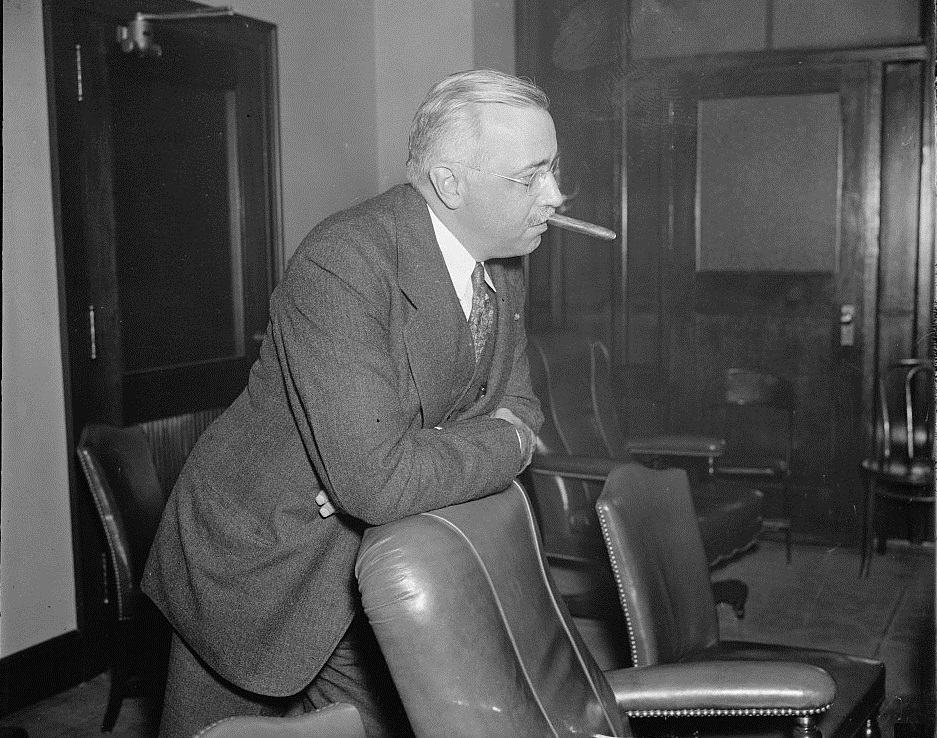
Case during his time with the FCC

After the war, Case became a companion of the Rhode Island Commandery of the Military Order of Foreign Wars.

== Political career ==
US President Warren G. Harding appointed Case US District Attorney for Rhode Island in 1921. Case left the position in 1926 to run for lieutenant governor. He won the election, taking office in 1927. Just over a year later, on February 4, 1928, Governor Aram J. Pothier died in office, making Case acting governor. Case won the governorship in his own right in 1928, and was reelected in 1930.

Case was soundly defeated by T. F. Green in his 1932 bid for re-election. This election marked a tidal shift in Rhode Island politics from being predominantly Republican to being predominantly Democratic.

President Franklin D. Roosevelt appointed Case as one of the initial commissioners of the Federal Communications Commission when the agency was set up in 1934 and reappointed him for a full seven-year term in 1938. In 1945, by-then Senator T. F. Green opposed Case's candidacy for a third term, and President Harry Truman did not renominate him. Case was succeeded on the FCC by former Vermont governor William H. Wills. After leaving the FCC, Case returned to private law practice, joining Frank W. Wozencraft, former general counsel for RCA, in the Washington firm of Case & Wozencraft.

Political offices
| Preceded by Nathaniel W. Smith | Lieutenant Governor of Rhode Island; 1927–1928 | Succeeded by James G. Connelly |
| Preceded by Aram J. Pothier | Governor of Rhode Island; 1928–1933 | Succeeded by Theodore F. Green |
| Preceded by George Dern | Chair of the National Governors Association; 1930–1932 | Succeeded by John Garland Pollard |
Party political offices
| Preceded by Aram J. Pothier | Republican nominee for Governor of Rhode Island; 1928, 1930, 1932 | Succeeded by Luke Callan |
Government offices
| New office | Commissioner of the Federal Communications Commission; 1934–1935 | Succeeded by William Wills |
