= 1934 United Kingdom local elections =

British elections

Local elections were held in London, city borough councils and in Scotland on 1 November 1934. The Labour Party gained many seats in sweeping successes throughout the country. In London, they won 457 seats, which gave them control of 11 councils and enabled them to hold four. In chief provincial boroughs, their net gains numbered 276 and gained 6 councils. There were also Scottish elections in which Labour also won many seats. The gains for Labour came at the expense of the Liberal Party which was by this stage had a declining presence in both national and local elections as well as the Conservative Party.

== Results ==
=== County Councils ===
==== England ====
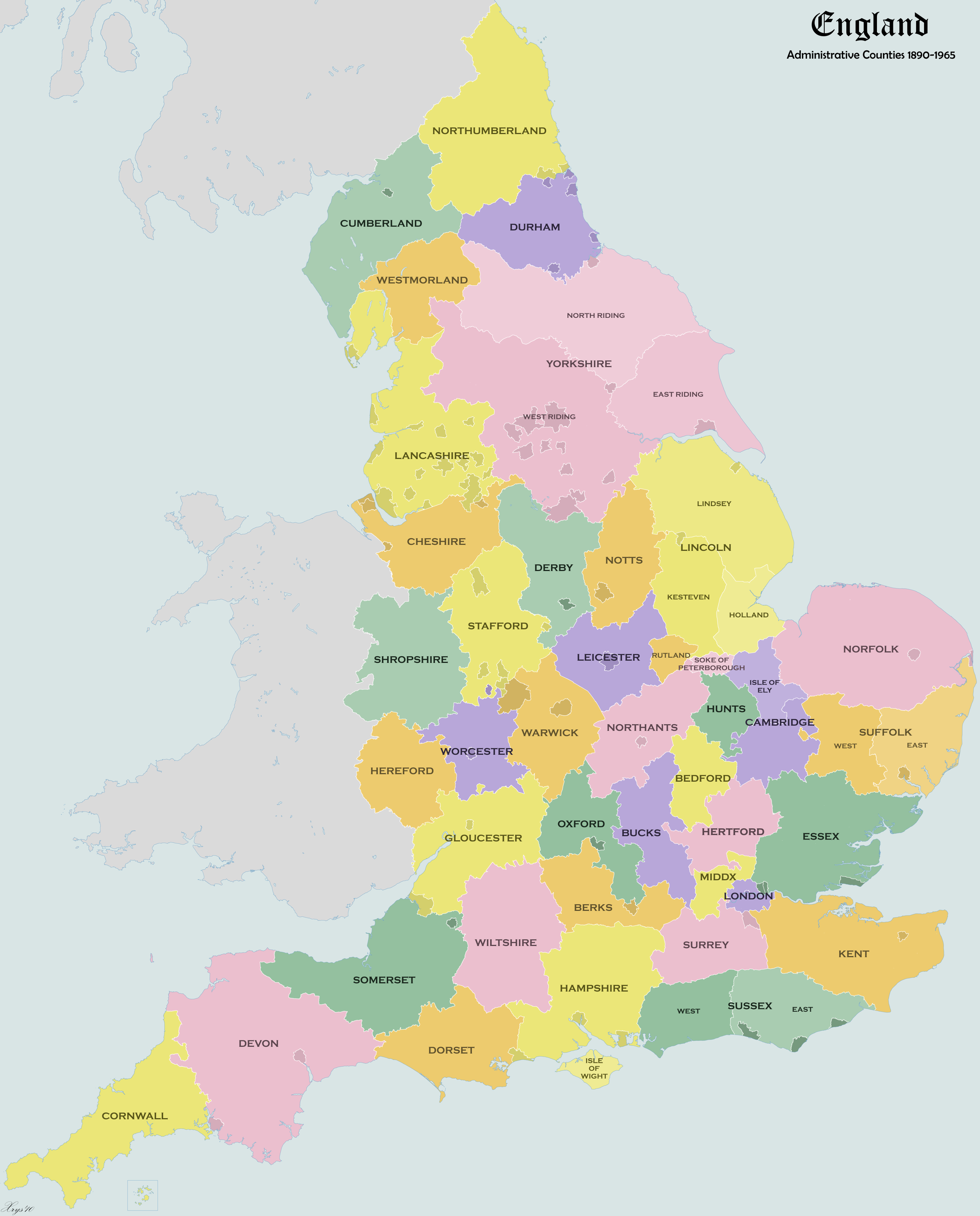
Map of County & Borough Councils in England.

Council	Previous control	Result	Details
Bedfordshire			Details
Berkshire			Details
Buckinghamshire			Details
Cambridgeshire			Details
Cheshire			Details
Cornwall			Details
Cumberland			Details
Derbyshire			Details
Devon			Details
Dorset			Details
Durham			Details
East Suffolk			Details
East Sussex			Details
Essex			Details
Gloucestershire			Details
Hampshire			Details
Herefordshire			Details
Hertfordshire			Details
Holland			Details
Huntingdonshire			Details
Isle of Ely			Details
Kent			Details
Kesteven			Details
Lancashire			Details
Leicestershire			Details
Lindsey			Details
London	Municipal Reform	Labour gain	Details
Middlesex	Middlesex Municipal Alliance	Middlesex Municipal Alliance	Details
Nottinghamshire			Details
East Riding			Details
North Riding			Details
West Riding			Details
West Suffolk			Details
West Sussex			Details
Westmorland			Details
Wiltshire			Details
Worcestershire			Details

==== Wales ====
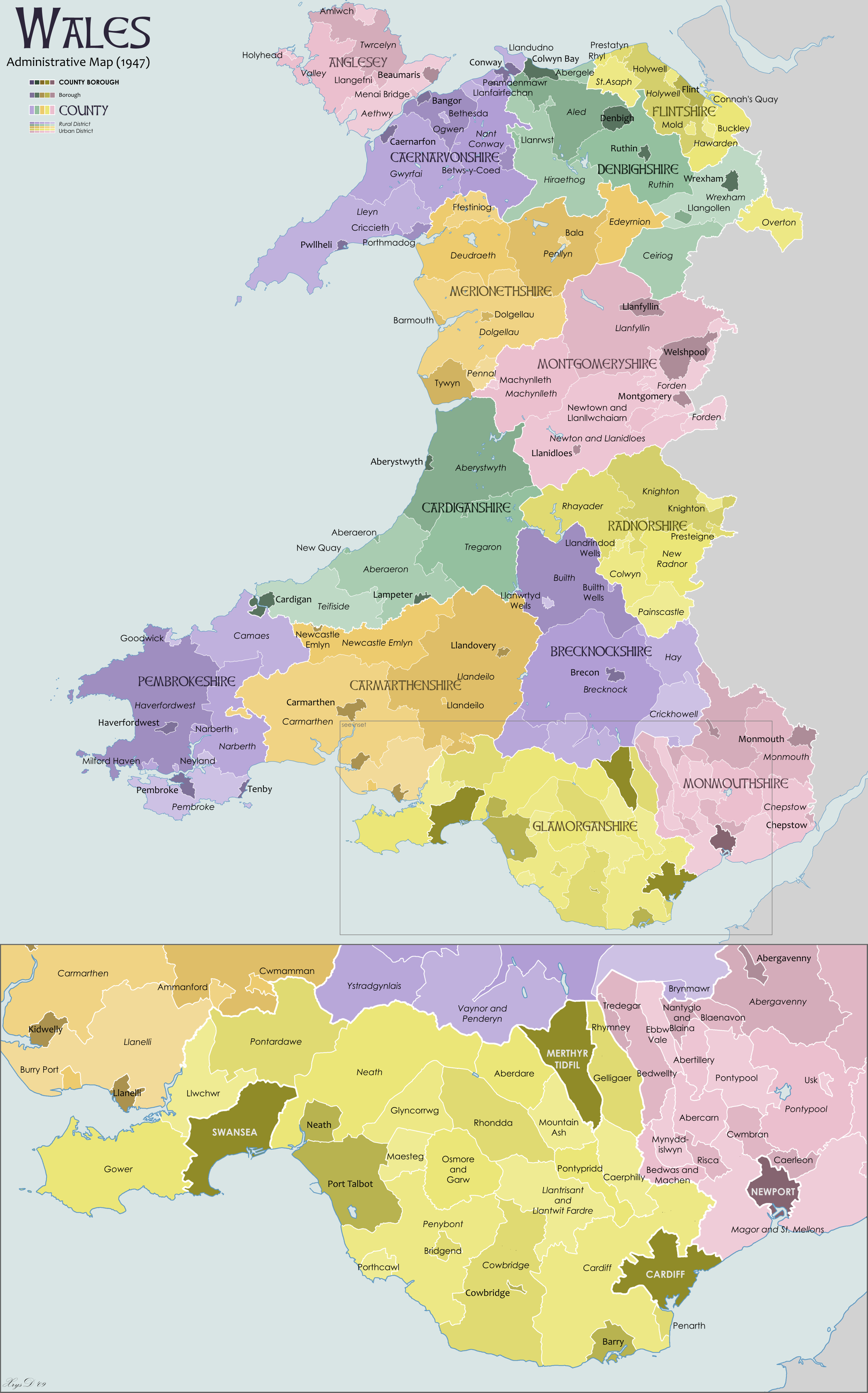
Map of Welsh local government divisions.

Council	Previous control	Result	Details
Anglesey			Details
Brecknockshire			Details
Carnarvonshire			Details
Cardiganshire			Details
Carmarthenshire	Independent	Independent	Details
Denbighshire			Details
Flintshire			Details
Glamorgan			Details
Merionethshire			Details
Monmouthshire			Details
Montgomeryshire			Details
Pembrokeshire			Details
Radnorshire			Details

=== London Metropolitan boroughs ===
Map of the results of the Metropolitan Borough elections.

Council	Previous control	Result	Details
Battersea	Municipal Reform	Labour gain	Details
Bermondsey	Labour	Labour hold	Details
Bethnal Green	Progressive	Labour gain	Details
Camberwell	Municipal Reform	Labour gain	Details
Chelsea	Municipal Reform	Municipal Reform hold	Details
Deptford	Labour	Labour hold	Details
Finsbury	Ratepayers Association	Labour gain	Details
Fulham	Municipal Reform	Labour gain	Details
Greenwich	No overall control	Labour gain	Details
Hackney	Municipal Reform	Labour gain	Details
Hammersmith	Constitutional Ratepayers Association	Constitutional Ratepayers Association hold	Details
Hampstead	Hampstead Municipal Electors' Alliance	Hampstead Municipal Electors' Alliance hold	Details
Holborn	Municipal Reform	Municipal Reform hold	Details
Islington	Municipal Reform	Labour gain	Details
Kensington	Municipal Reform	Municipal Reform hold	Details
Lambeth	Municipal Reform	Municipal Reform hold	Details
Lewisham	Municipal Reform	Municipal Reform hold	Details
Paddington	Municipal Reform	Municipal Reform hold	Details
Poplar	Labour	Labour hold	Details
Shoreditch	People's Party	Labour gain	Details
St Marylebone	Municipal Reform	Municipal Reform hold	Details
St Pancras	Municipal Reform	Municipal Reform hold	Details
Stepney	No overall control	Labour gain	Details
Stoke Newington	Ratepayers Association	Ratepayers Association hold	Details
Southwark	Municipal Reform	Labour gain	Details
Wandsworth	Municipal Reform	Municipal Reform hold	Details
Westminster	Municipal Reform	Municipal Reform hold	Details
Woolwich	Municipal Reform	Labour gain	Details
