= 1930 Rhode Island gubernatorial election =

- November 4, 1930
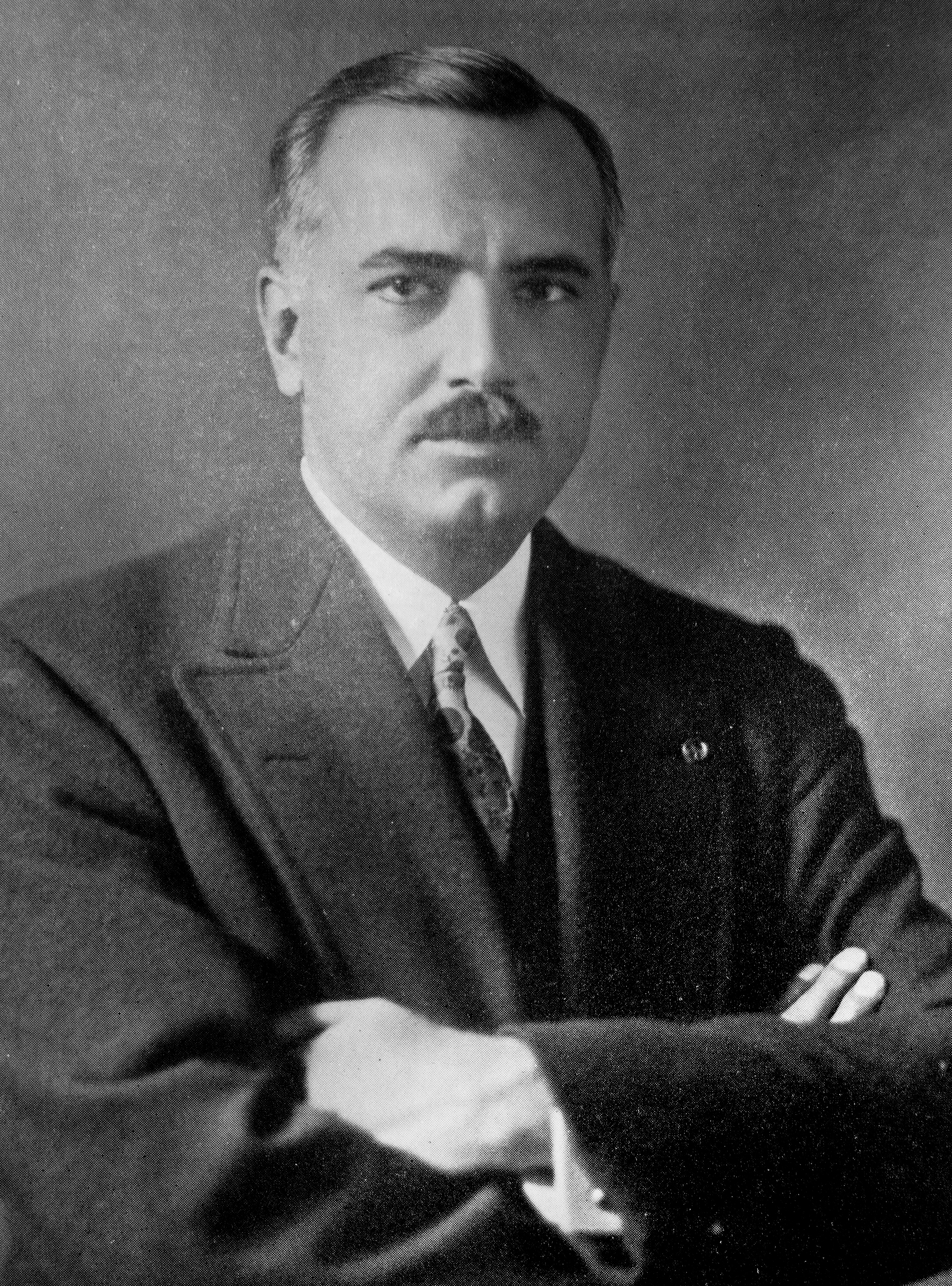

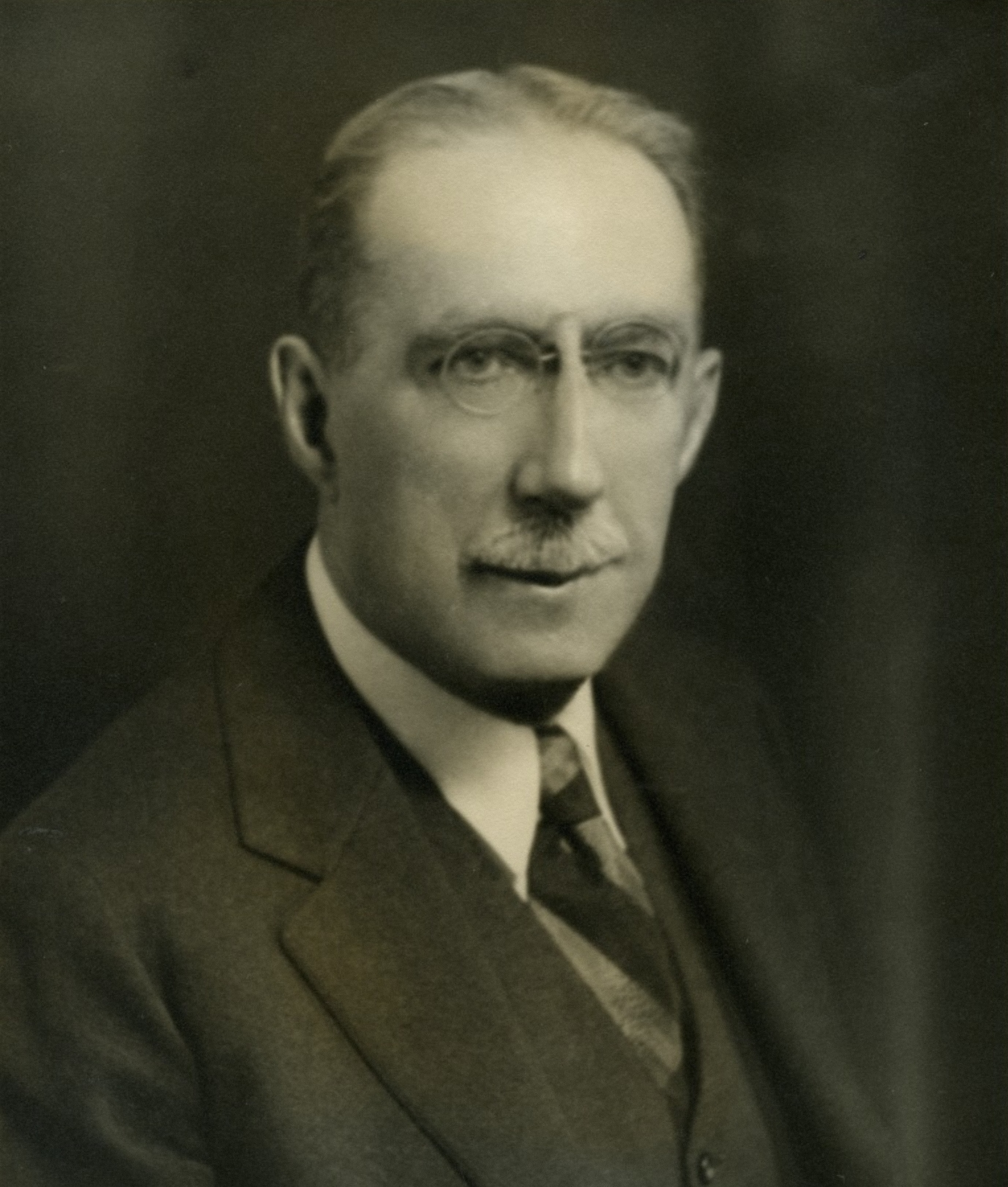
Nominee	Norman S. Case	Theodore F. Green
Party	Republican	Democratic
Popular vote	112,070	108,558
Percentage	50.53%	48.95%
- Case: 40–50% 50–60% 60–70% 70–80% 80–90% >90% Green: 50–60% 60–70%
Governor before election
Norman S. Case
Republican
Elected Governor
Norman S. Case
Republican

The 1930 Rhode Island gubernatorial election was held on November 4, 1930. Incumbent Republican Norman S. Case defeated Democratic nominee Theodore F. Green with 50.53% of the vote.

== General election ==
=== Candidates ===
Major party candidates

- Norman S. Case, Republican
- Theodore F. Green, Democratic

Other candidates

- Charles H. Dana, Socialist

=== Results ===
1930 Rhode Island gubernatorial election
Party	Candidate	Votes	%	±%
Republican	Norman S. Case (incumbent)	112,070	50.53%	
Democratic	Theodore F. Green	108,558	48.95%	
Socialist	Charles H. Dana	1,168	0.53%	
Majority		3,512		
Turnout				
Republican hold		Swing		
