= Edgar E. Witt =

American politician (1876–1965)

Edgar E. Witt (January 28, 1876 – July 11, 1965) was an American lawyer and politician who served as the 29th lieutenant governor of Texas from 1931 to 1935. He also served twice as chairman of the American-Mexican Claims Commission and chief commissioner of the Indian Claims Commission.

== Early life ==
Witt was born on January 28, 1876, in Bell County, Texas to James Monroe and Elizabeth (Simpson) Witt. He attended public schools in Eddy. He attended the University of Texas at Austin, joining the Phi Delta Theta fraternity along with his boyhood friend Tom T. Connally. He graduated in 1900 and graduated from the University of Texas Law School with an LL.B. in 1903. He married Gwynne Johnstone on June 6, 1904. They had no children.

== Legal career and military service ==
Witt joined a law firm in Waco in 1906 and later practiced with his brother, Charles F. Witt, beginning in 1912. He was elected to the Texas House of Representatives in 1914. In 1918, he was commissioned a captain in the United States Army and was sent to Paris, France.

== Political career ==
While Witt was abroad, a vacancy occurred in his home district, Texas Senate, District 11. In absentia, his name was entered as a candidate in the special election, and he won. He served in the Texas Senate until 1930.

Witt was elected Lieutenant Governor of Texas twice, in 1930 and 1932. He served under Governors Ross S. Sterling and Miriam A. "Ma" Ferguson, although Texas lieutenant governors do not run as a ticket with the governor. He ran for governor in 1934, but lost the Democratic primary to James V. Allred.

== Chairman of the Mexican Claims Commission ==
He then resumed the practice of law in Waco. In 1935, President Franklin D. Roosevelt appointed him chairman of the special Mexican Claims Commission. He served until 1938 and was appointed chairman again in 1943. He held the post until 1947. President Harry S. Truman appointed him chief commissioner of the Indian Claims Commission, and Witt served as chair of that commission until his retirement in June 1960.

Witt remained an active member of the Democratic party throughout his life.

== Death ==
Witt died in Austin on July 11, 1965, and was buried in the family plot in Oakwood Cemetery in Waco.

Party political offices
Preceded by Barry Miller	Democratic nominee for Lieutenant Governor of Texas; 1930, 1932	Succeeded by Walter Frank Woodul
Texas House of Representatives
Preceded by William Harmann	Member of the Texas House of Representatives from District 96 (Waco); 1915–1917	Succeeded by unknown
Texas Senate
Preceded by Augustus R. McCollum	Texas State Senator from District 11 (Waco); 1920 - 1930	Succeeded by John Davis
Political offices
Preceded by Barry Miller	Lieutenant Governor of Texas; 1931–1935	Succeeded by Walter Frank Woodul
