= Thomas Maddock's Sons Company =

- U.S. National Register of Historic Places
- New Jersey Register of Historic Places
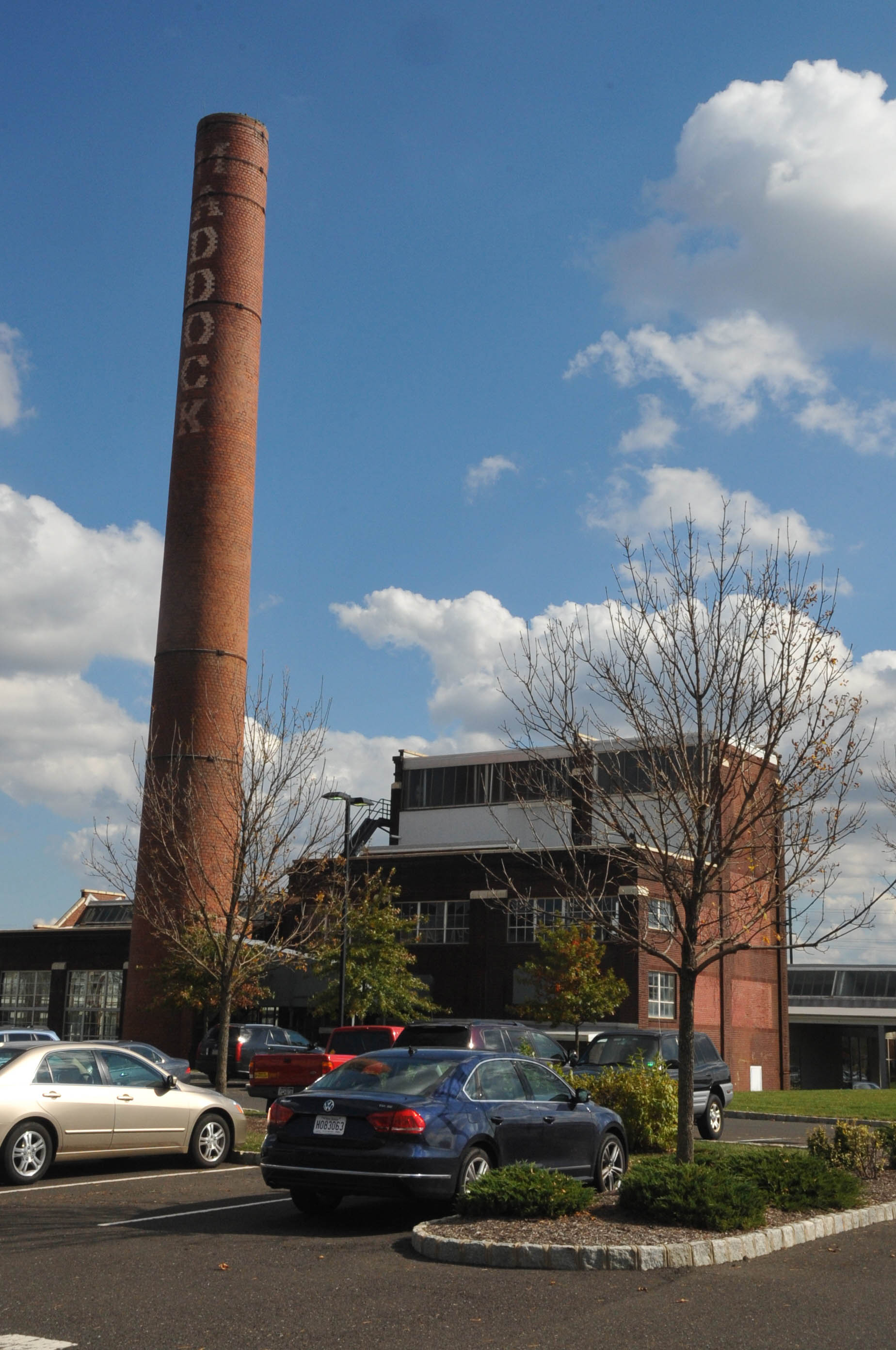

- Location within Mercer County, New Jersey Location within New Jersey Location within the United States
- Location: American Metro Boulevard, Hamilton Township, New Jersey
- Coordinates: 40°15′19.5″N 74°42′23.8″W
- Area: 65 acres (26 ha)
- Built: 1924-1925
- Architect: William E.S. Dyer
- Architectural style: 20th Century Industrial
- NRHP reference No.: 08000178
- NJRHP No.: 4425

Significant dates
- Added to NRHP: March 14, 2008
- Designated NJRHP: January 17, 2008

Thomas Maddock's Sons Company was founded by Thomas Maddock.

== History ==
The firm was originally named 'Millington & Astbury, before Maddock joined it in 1872. It was subsequently renamed 'Millington, Astbury & Maddock the next year. When Millington left, it became Asthury & Maddock, before assuming the name Thomas Maddock & Sons upon the departure of Asthury. The plant is in Hamilton Township, New Jersey. It was built in 1924-25 and manufactured sanitary ware.

Later it was purchased by American Standard in 1929 and production continued until 2002. The site lies adjacent to the Hamilton Train Station on the Northeast Corridor Line. It has been redeveloped as offices and is the centerpiece of transit-oriented development around the station.

The building's original address was 240 Princeton Avenue but now lies on American Metro Boulevard.

== See also ==
- Thomas Maddock
- National Register of Historic Places listings in Mercer County, New Jersey

== Bibliography ==
- Paul, Larry R (2013). From earth to art : the history of the Lamberton Works (PDF). Larry R Paul. "Thomas invented a method of fastening a brass coupling to the china. This made it possible to couple the metal pipe directly to the toilet. Thomas received a patent for the invention on June 29, 1880, and it was universally adopted within a short time."
