= Theodore F. Green =

American politician (1867–1966)

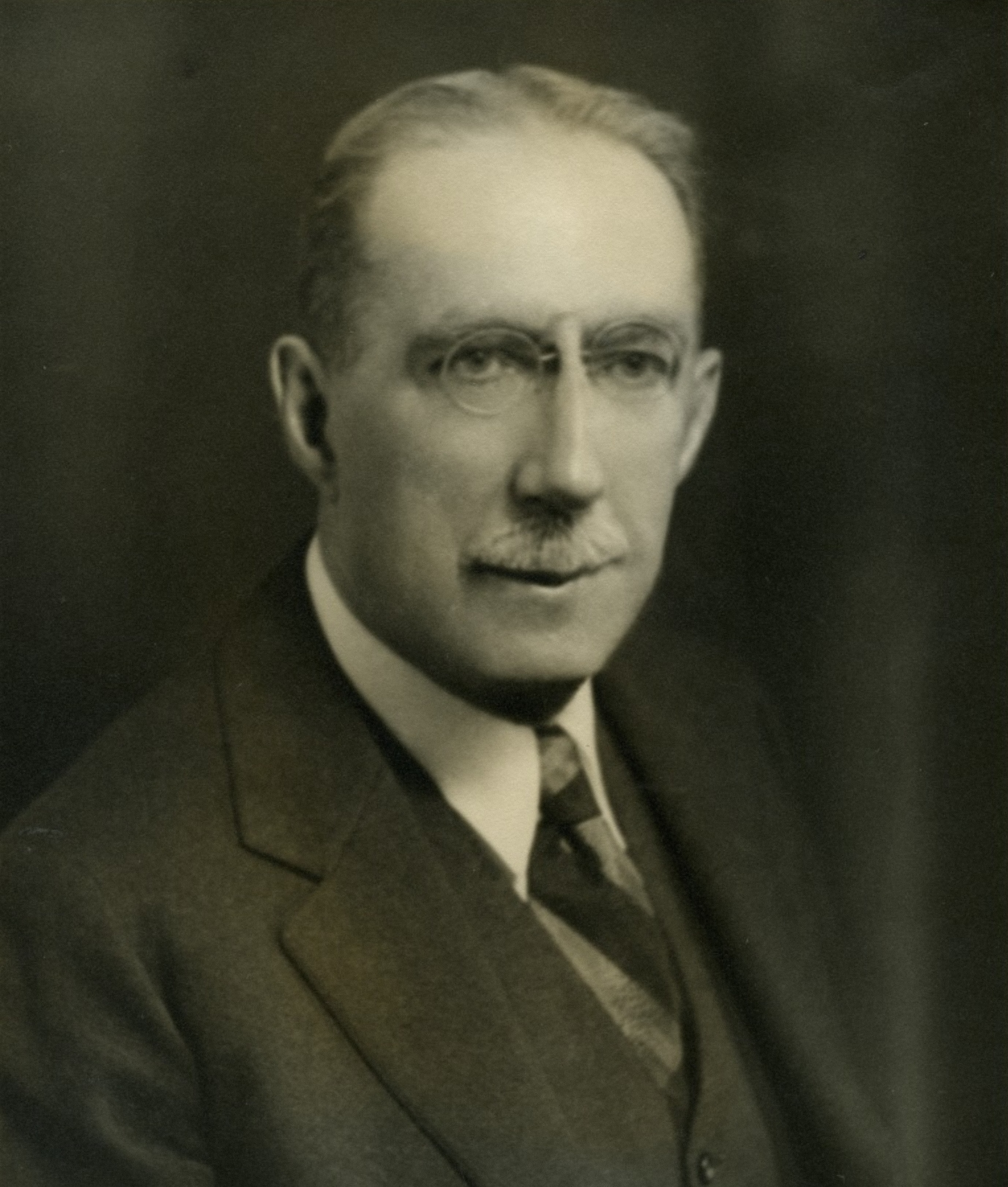

Chair of the Senate Committee on Foreign Relations
- In office January 3, 1957 – January 3, 1959
- Preceded by: Walter F. George
- Succeeded by: J. William Fulbright

United States Senator from Rhode Island
- In office January 3, 1937 – January 3, 1961
- Preceded by: Jesse H. Metcalf
- Succeeded by: Claiborne Pell

57th Governor of Rhode Island
- In office January 3, 1933 – January 5, 1937
- Lieutenant: Robert E. Quinn
- Preceded by: Norman S. Case
- Succeeded by: Robert E. Quinn

Member of the Rhode Island House of Representatives
- In office 1907

Personal details
- Born: Theodore Francis Green; October 2, 1867 Providence, Rhode Island, U.S.
- Died: May 19, 1966 (aged 98) Providence, Rhode Island, U.S.
- Resting place: Swan Point Cemetery, Providence, Rhode Island
- Party: Democratic
- Education: Brown University; Harvard University; University of Bonn; University of Berlin

Military service
- Allegiance: United States; Rhode Island
- Rank: First lieutenant
- Unit: Rhode Island Militia
- Battles/wars: Spanish–American War

Theodore Francis Green (October 2, 1867 – May 19, 1966) was an American politician from Rhode Island. A Democrat, Green served as the 57th governor of Rhode Island (1933–1937) and in the United States Senate (1937–1961). Green was a strong supporter of Wilsonian internationalism during the administrations of Franklin D. Roosevelt and Harry S. Truman. He served as chairman of the Senate Foreign Relations Committee from 1957 to 1959. At the time of his retirement in 1961, he set the record at age 93 of the oldest person to serve in the Senate; the record was subsequently broken by Strom Thurmond.

== Early years ==
Born in Providence, Rhode Island, to Arnold Green, a lawyer, and Cornelia Abby Burges, he graduated from Providence High School in 1883 and Brown University in 1887, receiving a Master of Arts degree from Brown in 1888. He attended Harvard Law School from 1888 to 1890 and studied at the University of Bonn and University of Berlin from 1890 to 1892. A lifelong bachelor, Green devoted himself to the law, politics, and civic, business, and cultural activities. Admitted to the Rhode Island Bar in 1892, he long practiced law, taking time during the Spanish–American War to serve in the Rhode Island Militia as a first lieutenant in command of a provisional infantry company. He served as president of J. P. Coats Company from 1912 to 1923 and Morris Plan Banker's Association from 1900 to 1929.

== Public service ==
Green began his career in public life in 1907 as a member of the Rhode Island House of Representatives. Active in Democratic Party politics as chairman of state committees and a delegate to Democratic National Conventions, he was an unsuccessful candidate for governor (1912, 1928, 1930) and the U.S. House of Representatives (1920). Party loyalty, perseverance, and the Great Depression won him election as governor in 1932. He served two terms (1933–1937).

=== "Bloodless Revolution" ===
Until the 1934 United States elections, the Republican Party dominated the Rhode Island Senate. This resulted in part from the unequal nature of senatorial districts: every municipality in the state was represented by a senator, despite significant imbalances in population between different towns. For example, both the 485 residents of West Greenwich and the 275,000 residents of Providence were represented by one senator each. Republicans won small towns with majority Protestant populations, while Democrats won larger cities with significant immigrant Catholic populations. As a consequence, even when Democrats won the statewide vote, Republicans would win more senatorial districts.

In addition, the Senate held much of the executive and appointment power in the state, such as the power to name judges. This left the state governor oftentimes a figurehead, especially if they were a Democrat. Democrats called this system "feudal" and analogized it to the United Kingdom's rotten boroughs, even though unequally-sized state legislative upper houses were common in the United States prior to the 1964 U.S. Supreme Court decision in Reynolds v. Sims.

The 1934 elections were a national Democratic landslide, with Green winning re-election as governor, and Democrats winning control of the Rhode Island House of Representatives. However, they fell just short of controlling the Rhode Island Senate, winning 20 seats to Republicans' 22. Democrats claimed fraud in two races where Republicans had won. On January 1, 1935, Lt. Gov. Robert E. Quinn refused to allow two Republican senators who were certified as elected to take office. A committee of three senators, two Democrats and one Republican, was appointed to recount the ballots for these two races. Behind closed doors, the committee reviewed the ballots and then unanimously proclaimed the Democrats as the winners.

With the Senate in Democratic control, the General Assembly quickly reorganized state government, vacated the Rhode Island Supreme Court, and purged many Republican-dominated boards and commissions. A Providence Journal editorial likened this incident to a Central American "coup d'etat". However, state Democrats celebrated the incident as overturning a long period of minority rule, and would later refer to it as the "Bloodless Revolution."

=== Senator ===
At the age of 69, Green was elected to the United States Senate in the Democratic landslide of 1936 and served four terms, retiring in 1961. Described as "the president's man", he was loyal to the Democratic presidents with whom he served and, to a larger extent than many other northern Democrats, to President Dwight D. Eisenhower, a Republican. Green vigorously supported domestic New Deal measures, including President Franklin D. Roosevelt's controversial "Court packing" bill in 1937, but that failed. He voted for the wages and hours and low-cost housing bills in 1937, and advocating farm and work relief, he sustained continuing appropriations for New Deal relief measures.

As a senior member of the Senate Foreign Relations Committee, Green took a strong internationalist position in world affairs, especially regarding opposition to Nazi expansion in Europe. Green advocated expansion of the Navy and the Army, revision of the neutrality laws despite isolationist opposition, and passage of the Lend-Lease Bill, which in one of his many radio talks he called "Aid to America".

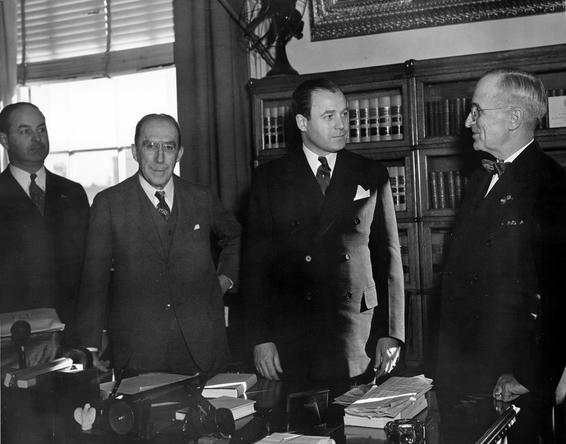
Green with President Harry Truman and U.S. Senator J. Howard McGrath in 1947

During World War II, Green vigorously objected to a proposal to exempt farm workers from the draft as a means to increase agricultural production and secured passage of a law releasing government-owned silver for war purposes. He supported a law providing for absentee voting for servicemen stationed in the United States and headed a Senate committee investigating violations of the Hatch Act.

Throughout his senatorial career, Green supported civil rights legislation. He struggled to enact laws to ban the poll tax, to make lynching a federal crime, and to change Senate rules to make it easier to end filibusters. Consistently working closely with Majority Leader Lyndon B. Johnson, he helped secure eastern liberal support for the Civil Rights Act of 1957. As the nation moved to the right at mid-century, Green retained his liberal faith, voting to uphold President Harry Truman's vetoes of the restrictive McCarran-Walter Immigration Bill of 1952 and the McCarran Internal Security Act of 1950. During the McCarthy controversy, he voted for censure of his Republican colleague Senator Joseph McCarthy.

For 20 of his 24 years in the Senate, Green served on the Foreign Relations Committee, beginning in 1938 and interrupted from 1947 to 1949. An early and steadfast internationalist committed to the United Nations, he stoutly sustained President Truman's Cold War initiatives, including the Truman Doctrine, the Marshall Plan, the North Atlantic Treaty Organization, and intervention in Korea. At the 1952 meeting of the UN General Assembly, to which Truman appointed him as a delegate, Green expressed his faith in the world organization as the "last great hope of mankind." He stood with the minority of 31 senators who by one vote prevented the two-thirds majority necessary to pass an amendment initiated by Senator John W. Bricker to limit the president's powers in foreign policy.

In April 1943, a confidential analysis by British scholar Isaiah Berlin of the Foreign Relations Committee for the British Foreign Office succinctly characterized Green as:

a former Governor of his State, he is, for all his years, a typical "progressive" pro-New Deal businessman. While he is a man of limited intellect, he is right-minded to a degree and a completely reliable ally of the Administration. He is a free trader with a particular hatred of the "Silver Bloc" in the Senate.

Though wary of reductions in foreign aid programs with the coming of the Eisenhower administration, Green was one of the few northern Democrats to support administration measures in the Republican-dominated Senate of the Eighty-third Congress. In the Eighty-fifth Congress (1957–1958), Green served as Chairman of the Foreign Relations Committee. He was a loyal ally of Democratic Majority Leader Lyndon Johnson.

== Death ==
In 1959, with his health failing, the 92-year-old Green resigned his chairmanship; he left the Senate at the conclusion of his term in 1961. Green died in Providence, Rhode Island on May 19, 1966, at the age of 98. He was interred at Swan Point Cemetery in Providence.

== Legacy ==
- Rhode Island's main airport, Rhode Island T. F. Green International Airport (formerly Hillsgrove Airport) in Warwick, is named after him.
- In 2010, activists in the Rhode Island labor movement began a drive to change the name of the airport to "Workers Memorial Airport" due to Green's involvement in the violent suppression of a textile workers' strike in Saylesville, Rhode Island in 1934.
- Two bronze busts of Green (sculpted by Margaret Chambers Gould) are on public display in Rhode Island. One is at Green Airport in Warwick and the other is at the Rhode Island State House in Providence.

Following the death of Fenimore Chatterton of Wyoming on May 9, 1958, Green became the oldest living former US Governor, and the oldest living former US Senator following the death of George Pepper in 1961.

Party political offices
Preceded by Lewis A. Waterman	Democratic nominee for Governor of Rhode Island; 1912	Succeeded by Patrick H. Quinn
Preceded by Alberic A. Archambault	Democratic nominee for Governor of Rhode Island; 1930, 1932, 1934	Succeeded by Robert E. Quinn
Preceded by Peter G. Gerry	Democratic nominee for U.S. Senator from Rhode Island (Class 2); 1936, 1942, 1948, 1954	Succeeded by Claiborne Pell
Political offices
Preceded by Norman S. Case	Governor of Rhode Island; 1933–1937	Succeeded by Robert E. Quinn
Preceded by Walter F. George	Chairman of the Senate Foreign Relations Committee; 1957–1959	Succeeded by J. William Fulbright
U.S. Senate
Preceded by Jesse H. Metcalf	U.S. senator (Class 2) from Rhode Island; January 3, 1937 – January 3, 1961; Served alongside: Peter G. Gerry, J. Howard McGrath, Edward L. Leahy, John O. Pastore	Succeeded by Claiborne Pell
Honorary titles
Preceded by George Pepper	Oldest living U.S. senator May 24, 1961 – May 19, 1966	Succeeded by John Heiskell
