= 1934 New York gubernatorial election =

- November 6, 1934
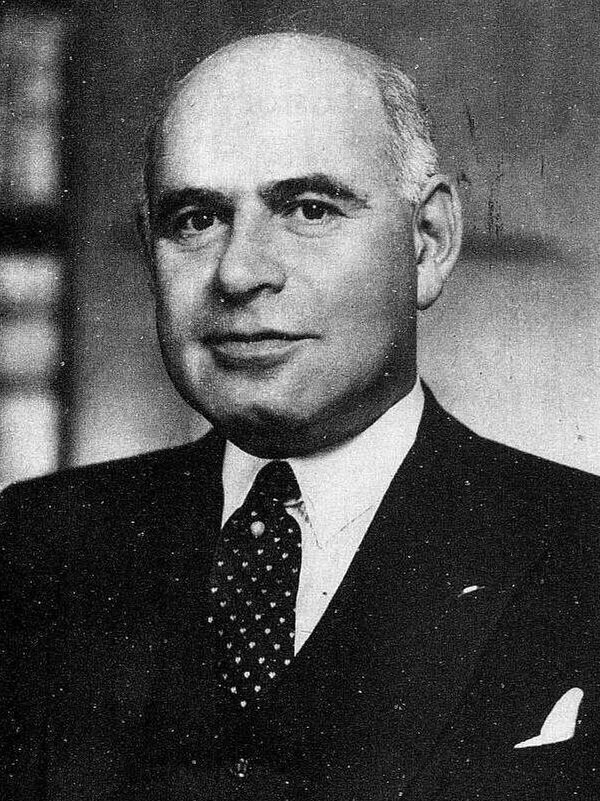

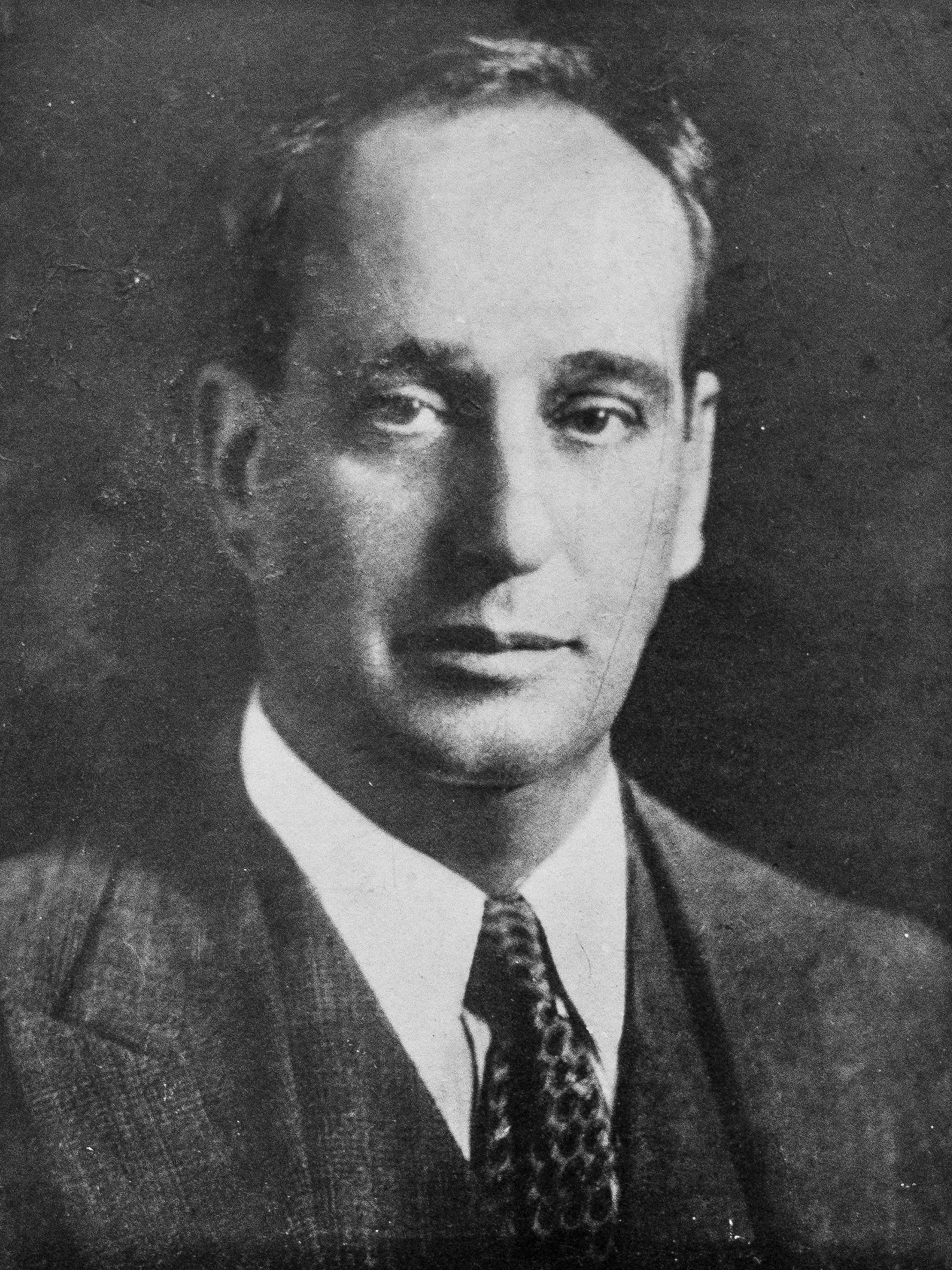
Nominee	Herbert H. Lehman	Robert Moses
Party	Democratic	Republican
Popular vote	2,201,729	1,393,638
Percentage	58.01%	36.72%
- County results Lehman: 40–50% 50–60% 60–70% 70–80% Moses: 40–50% 50–60% 60–70%
Governor before election
Herbert H. Lehman
Democratic
Elected Governor
Herbert H. Lehman
Democratic

The 1934 New York gubernatorial election was held on November 6, 1934, to elect the Governor of New York. Incumbent Democratic governor Herbert H. Lehman ran for re-election, and he defeated Republican Robert Moses in the general election by a landslide.

== Republican nomination ==
=== Candidates ===
- Seabury C. Mastick, state senator from Pleasantville
- Robert Moses, chair of the New York State Council of Parks, commissioner of the New York City Department of Parks and Recreation, and former Secretary of State of New York
- Samuel Seabury, former judge of the New York State Court of Appeals and Democratic nominee for governor in 1916

=== Convention ===
The Republican convention met on September 28 in Rochester. Moses was nominated on the third ballot after a struggle between his supporters and the Suffolk County party machine controlled by W. Kingsland Macy.

== General election ==
=== Candidates ===
- Israel Amter, activist and perennial candidate (Communist)
- Herbert H. Lehman, incumbent governor since 1933 (Democratic)
- Robert Moses, chair of the New York State Council of Parks, commissioner of the New York City Department of Parks and Recreation, and former Secretary of State of New York (Republican)
- Aaron M. Orange (Socialist Labor)
- Charles Solomon, former assemblyman from Brooklyn (Socialist)
- William F. Varney, 1928 Prohibition Party nominee for president of the United States (Law Preservation)

==== Disqualified ====
- John F. Hylan, former mayor of New York City (Recovery)

=== Results ===
1934 New York gubernatorial election
Party	Candidate	Votes	%	±%
Democratic	Herbert H. Lehman	2,201,729	58.01%	▲1.32
Republican	Robert Moses	1,393,638	36.72%	▼1.10
Socialist	Charles Solomon	126,580	3.34%	▲1.15
Communist	Israel Amter	45,878	1.21%	▲0.65
Law Preservation	William F. Varney	20,449	0.54%	▼1.24
Socialist Labor	Aaron M. Orange	7,225	0.19%	▲0.04
Total votes		3,795,499	100.00%	

== See also ==
- 1934 New York state election
- New York gubernatorial elections
