= 1934 Ohio gubernatorial election =

- November 6, 1934
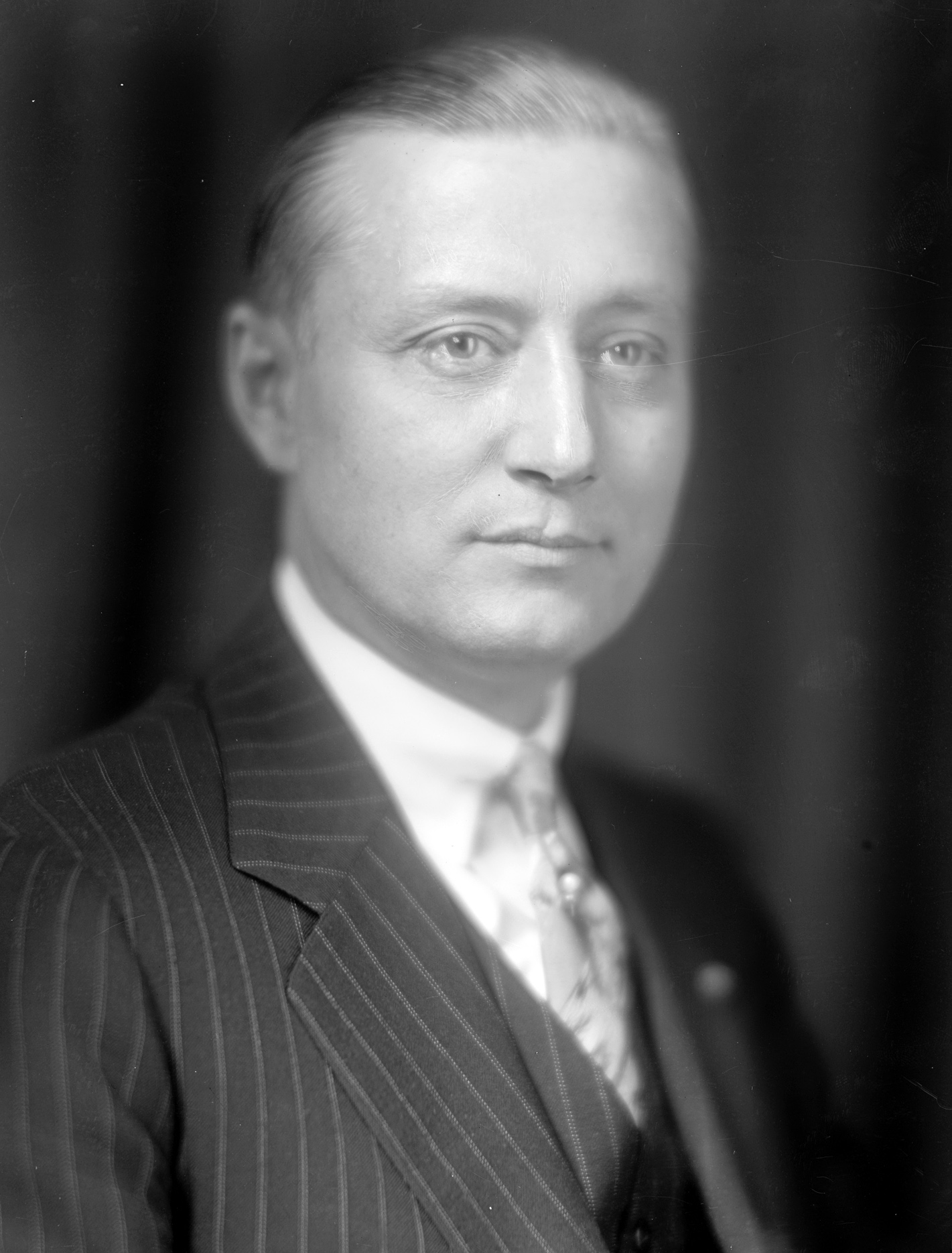

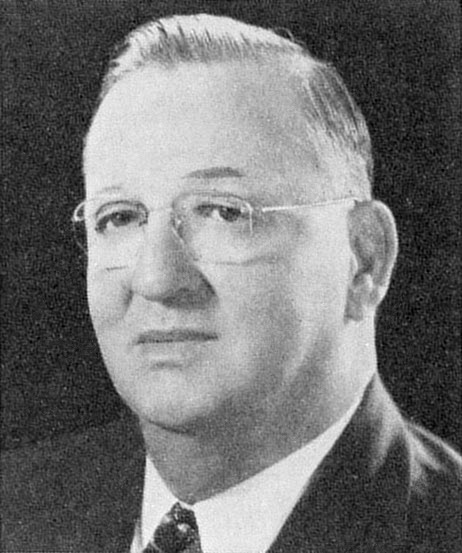
| Nominee | Martin L. Davey | Clarence J. Brown |
| Party | Democratic | Republican |
| Popular vote | 1,118,257 | 1,052,851 |
| Percentage | 51.13% | 48.14% |
- County results Davey: 50–60% 60–70% Brown: 40–50% 50–60% 60–70%
Governor before election
George White
Democratic
Elected Governor
Martin L. Davey
Democratic

The 1934 Ohio gubernatorial election was held on November 6, 1934. Democratic nominee Martin L. Davey defeated Republican nominee Clarence J. Brown with 51.13% of the vote.

== General election ==
=== Candidates ===
Major party candidates

- Martin L. Davey, Democratic
- Clarence J. Brown, Republican

Other candidates

- I. O. Ford, Communist

=== Results ===
1934 Ohio gubernatorial election
| Party | Candidate | Votes | % | ±% |
|---|---|---|---|---|
| Democratic | Martin L. Davey | 1,118,257 | 51.13% | |
| Republican | Clarence J. Brown | 1,052,851 | 48.14% | |
| Communist | I. O. Ford | 15,854 | 0.73% | |
| Majority | | 65,406 | | |
| Turnout | | | | |
| Democratic hold | | Swing | | |
