= 1934 Rhode Island gubernatorial election =

- November 6, 1934
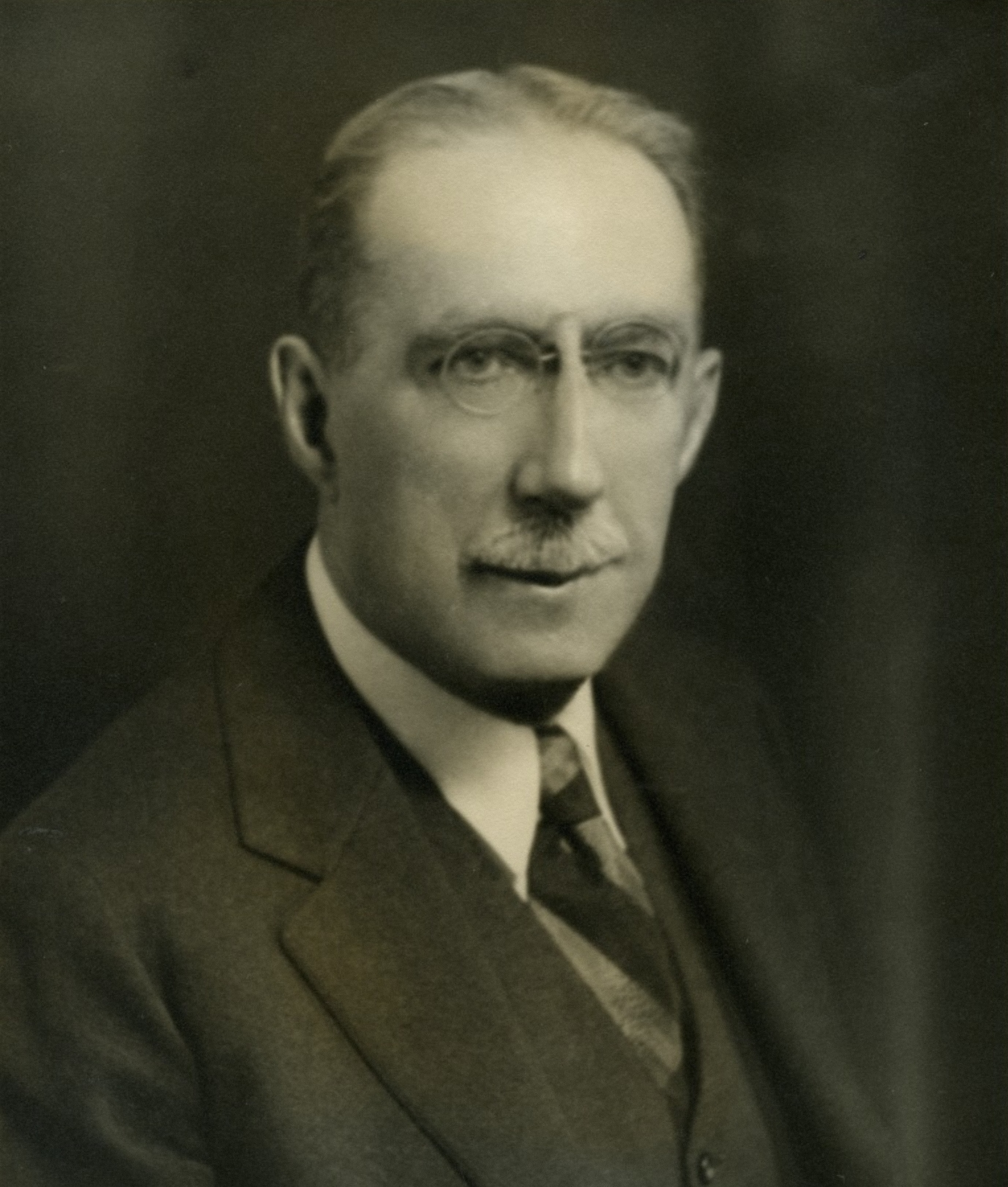

Nominee	Theodore F. Green	Luke H. Callan
Party	Democratic	Republican
Popular vote	140,258	105,139
Percentage	56.62%	42.44%
- Green: 50–60% 60–70% Callan: 50–60% 60–70% 70–80%
Governor before election
Theodore F. Green
Democratic
Elected Governor
Theodore F. Green
Democratic

The 1934 Rhode Island gubernatorial election was held on November 6, 1934. Incumbent Democrat Theodore F. Green defeated Republican nominee Luke H. Callan with 56.62% of the vote.

== General election ==
=== Candidates ===
Major party candidates

- Theodore F. Green, Democratic
- Luke H. Callan, Republican

Other candidates

- Joseph M. Coldwell, Socialist

=== Results ===
1934 Rhode Island gubernatorial election
Party	Candidate	Votes	%	±%
Democratic	Theodore F. Green (incumbent)	140,258	56.62%	
Republican	Luke H. Callan	105,139	42.44%	
Socialist	Joseph M. Coldwell	2,333	0.94%	
Majority		35,119		
Turnout				
Democratic hold		Swing		
