= 1934 Kansas gubernatorial election =

- November 6, 1934
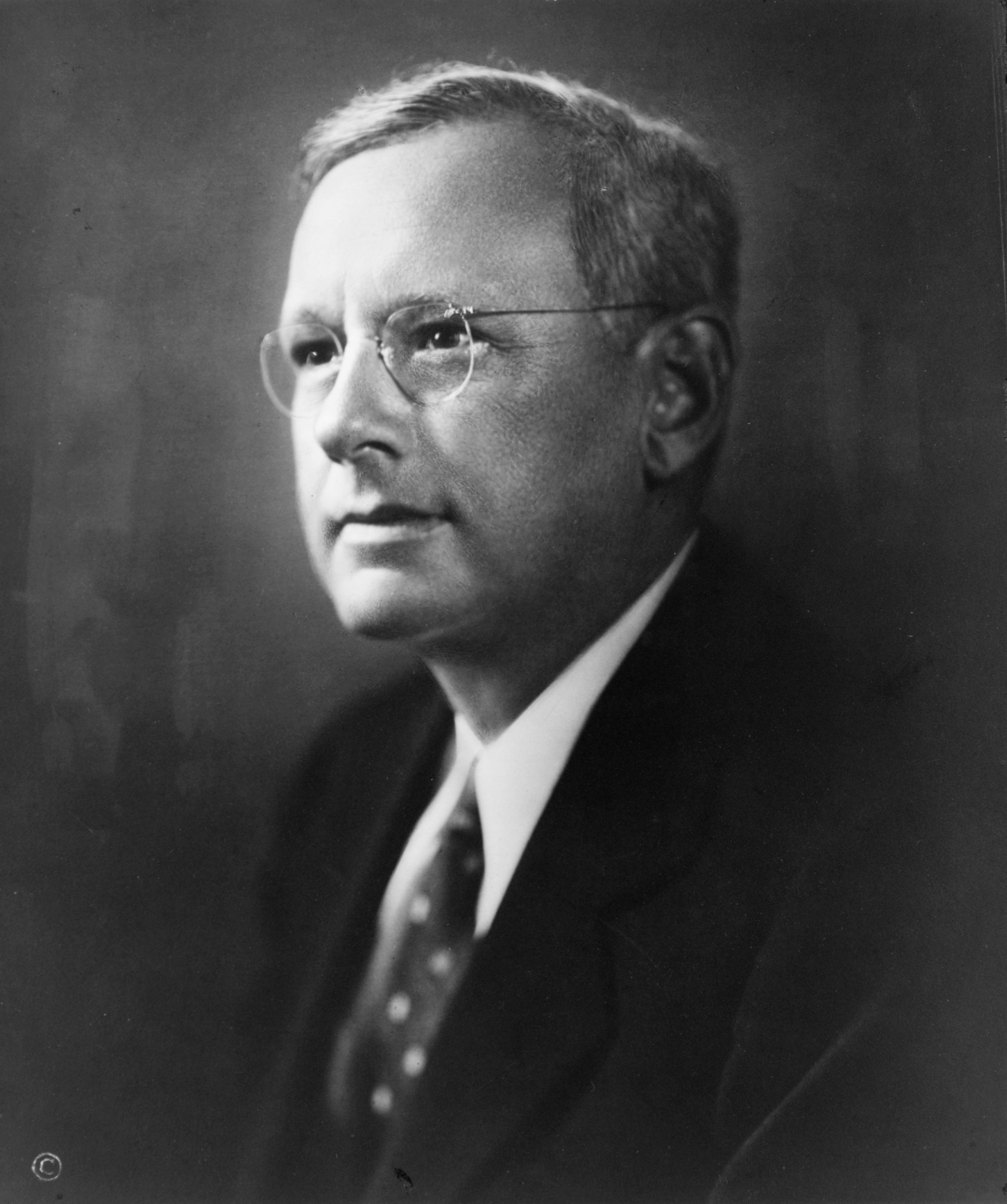

Nominee	Alf Landon	Omar B. Ketchum
Party	Republican	Democratic
Popular vote	422,030	359,877
Percentage	53.51%	45.63%
- County results Landon: 40–50% 50–60% 60–70% Ketchum: 40–50% 50–60% 60–70%
Governor before election
Alf Landon
Republican
Elected Governor
Alf Landon
Republican

The 1934 Kansas gubernatorial election was held on November 6, 1934. Incumbent Republican Alf Landon defeated Democratic nominee Omar B. Ketchum with 53.51% of the vote.

== Primary elections ==
Primary elections were held on August 7, 1934.

=== Democratic primary ===
==== Candidates ====
- Omar B. Ketchum, Mayor of Topeka
- Thurman Hill
- Charles E. Miller
- Kirk Prather
- George E. Rogers
- Walter Eggers

==== Results ====
Democratic primary results
Party	Candidate	Votes	%
Democratic	Omar B. Ketchum	54,486	35.00
Democratic	Thurman Hill	40,307	25.89
Democratic	Charles E. Miller	31,420	20.19
Democratic	Kirk Prather	17,021	10.94
Democratic	George E. Rogers	8,712	5.60
Democratic	Walter Eggers	3,715	2.39
Total votes		155,661	100.00

=== Republican primary ===
==== Candidates ====
- Alf Landon, incumbent Governor
- John R. Brinkley, businessman

==== Results ====
Republican primary results
Party	Candidate	Votes	%
Republican	Alf Landon (incumbent)	234,699	79.90
Republican	John R. Brinkley	59,036	20.10
Total votes		293,735	100.00

== General election ==
=== Candidates ===
Major party candidates

- Alf Landon, Republican
- Omar B. Ketchum, Democratic

Other candidates

- George M. Whiteside, Socialist

=== Results ===
1934 Kansas gubernatorial election
Party	Candidate	Votes	%	±%
Republican	Alf Landon (incumbent)	422,030	53.51%	
Democratic	Omar B. Ketchum	359,877	45.63%	
Socialist	George M. Whiteside	6,744	0.86%	
Majority		62,153		
Turnout				
Republican hold		Swing		
