= 1929 in the United States =

- Decades: 1900s; 1910s; 1920s; 1930s; 1940s
- See also: History of the United States (1918–1945); Timeline of United States history (1900–1929); List of years in the United States

Events from the year 1929 in the United States.

== Incumbents ==
=== Federal government ===
- President:

Calvin Coolidge (R-Massachusetts) (until March 4)
Herbert Hoover (R-California) (starting March 4)

- Vice President:

Charles G. Dawes (R-Illinois) (until March 4)
Charles Curtis (R-Kansas) (starting March 4)

- Chief Justice: William Howard Taft (Ohio)
- Speaker of the House of Representatives: Nicholas Longworth (R-Ohio)
- Senate Majority Leader:

Charles Curtis (R-Kansas) (until March 4)
James Eli Watson (R-Indiana) (starting March 4)

- Congress: 70th (until March 4), 71st (starting March 4)

==== State governments ====
Governors and lieutenant governors

=== Governors ===
- Governor of Alabama: Bibb Graves (Democratic)
- Governor of Arizona: George W. P. Hunt (Democratic) (until January 7), John Calhoun Phillips (Republican) (starting January 7)
- Governor of Arkansas: Harvey Parnell (Democratic)
- Governor of California: Clement C. Young (Republican)
- Governor of Colorado: Billy Adams (Democratic)
- Governor of Connecticut: John H. Trumbull (Republican)
- Governor of Delaware: Robert P. Robinson (Republican) (until January 15), C. Douglass Buck (Republican) (starting January 15)
- Governor of Florida: John W. Martin (Democratic) (until January 8), Doyle E. Carlton (Democratic) (starting January 8)
- Governor of Georgia: Lamartine G. Hardman (Democratic)
- Governor of Idaho: H. C. Baldridge (Republican)
- Governor of Illinois: Len Small (Republican) (until January 14), Louis L. Emmerson (Republican) (starting January 14)
- Governor of Indiana: Edward L. Jackson (Republican) (until January 14), Harry G. Leslie (Republican) (starting January 14)
- Governor of Iowa: John Hammill (Republican)
- Governor of Kansas: Ben S. Paulen (Republican) (until January 14), Clyde M. Reed (Republican) (starting January 14)
- Governor of Kentucky: Flem D. Sampson (Republican)
- Governor of Louisiana: Huey P. Long (Democratic)
- Governor of Maine: Owen Brewster (Republican) (until January 2), William Tudor Gardiner (Republican) (starting January 2)
- Governor of Maryland: Albert C. Ritchie (Democratic)
- Governor of Massachusetts: Alvan T. Fuller (Republican) (until January 3), Frank G. Allen (Republican) (starting January 3)
- Governor of Michigan: Fred W. Green (Republican)
- Governor of Minnesota: Theodore Christianson (Republican)
- Governor of Mississippi: Theodore G. Bilbo (Democratic)
- Governor of Missouri: Samuel Aaron Baker (Republican) (until January 14), Henry S. Caulfield (Republican) (starting January 14)
- Governor of Montana: John E. Erickson (Democratic)
- Governor of Nebraska: Adam McMullen (Republican) (until January 3), Arthur J. Weaver (Republican) (starting January 3)
- Governor of Nevada: Fred B. Balzar (Republican)
- Governor of New Hampshire: Huntley N. Spaulding (Republican) (until January 3), Charles W. Tobey (Republican) (starting January 3)
- Governor of New Jersey: A. Harry Moore (Democratic) (until January 15), Morgan Foster Larson (Republican) (starting January 15)
- Governor of New Mexico: Richard C. Dillon (Republican)
- Governor of New York: Franklin D. Roosevelt (Democratic) (starting January 1)
- Governor of North Carolina: Angus Wilton McLean (Democratic) (until January 11), Oliver Max Gardner (Democratic) (starting January 11)
- Governor of North Dakota: Walter Maddock (Republican) (until January 9), George F. Shafer (Republican) (starting January 9)
- Governor of Ohio: A. Victor Donahey (Democratic) (until January 14), Myers Y. Cooper (Republican) (starting January 14)
- Governor of Oklahoma: Henry S. Johnston (Democratic) (until March 20), William J. Holloway (Democratic) (starting March 20)
- Governor of Oregon: I. L. Patterson (Republican) (until December 22), A. W. Norblad (Republican) (starting December 22)
- Governor of Pennsylvania: John Stuchell Fisher (Republican)
- Governor of Rhode Island: Norman S. Case (Republican)
- Governor of South Carolina: John Gardiner Richards Jr. (Democratic)
- Governor of South Dakota: William J. Bulow (Democratic)
- Governor of Tennessee: Henry Hollis Horton (Democratic)
- Governor of Texas: Dan Moody (Democratic)
- Governor of Utah: George Dern (Democratic)
- Governor of Vermont: John E. Weeks (Republican)
- Governor of Virginia: Harry F. Byrd (Democratic)
- Governor of Washington: Roland H. Hartley (Republican)
- Governor of West Virginia: Howard M. Gore (Republican) (until March 4), William G. Conley (Republican) (starting March 4)
- Governor of Wisconsin: Fred R. Zimmerman (Republican) (until January 7), Walter J. Kohler Sr. (Republican) (starting January 7)
- Governor of Wyoming: Frank C. Emerson (Republican)

=== Lieutenant governors ===
- Lieutenant Governor of Alabama: William C. Davis (Democratic)
- Lieutenant Governor of Arkansas: vacant (until January 14), William Lee Cazort (Democratic) (starting January 14)
- Lieutenant Governor of California: H. L. Carnahan (Republican)
- Lieutenant Governor of Colorado: George Milton Corlett (Republican)
- Lieutenant Governor of Connecticut: J. Edwin Brainard (Republican) (until month and day unknown), Ernest E. Rogers (Republican) (starting month and day unknown)
- Lieutenant Governor of Delaware: James H. Anderson (Republican) (until January 15), James H. Hazel (Republican) (starting January 15)
- Lieutenant Governor of Idaho:
  - until January 7: O. E. Hailey (Republican)
  - January 7-September 30: W. B. Kinne (Republican)
  - September 30-October 25: vacant
  - starting October 25: O. E. Hailey (Republican)
- Lieutenant Governor of Illinois: Fred E. Sterling (Republican)
- Lieutenant Governor of Indiana: F. Harold Van Orman (Republican) (until January 14), Edgar D. Bush (Republican) (starting January 14)
- Lieutenant Governor of Iowa: Arch W. McFarlane (Republican)
- Lieutenant Governor of Kansas: De Lanson Alson Newton Chase (Republican) (until month and day unknown), Jacob W. Graybill (Republican) (starting month and day unknown)
- Lieutenant Governor of Kentucky: James Breathitt Jr. (Democratic)
- Lieutenant Governor of Louisiana: Paul N. Cyr (Democratic)
- Lieutenant Governor of Massachusetts: Frank G. Allen (Republican) (until January 3), William S. Youngman (political party unknown) (starting January 3)
- Lieutenant Governor of Michigan: Luren D. Dickinson (Republican)
- Lieutenant Governor of Minnesota: William I. Nolan (Republican) (until June 25), Charles Edward Adams (Republican) (starting June 25)
- Lieutenant Governor of Mississippi: Bidwell Adam (Democratic)
- Lieutenant Governor of Missouri: Philip Allen Bennett (Republican) (until January 14), Edward Henry Winter (Republican) (starting January 14)
- Lieutenant Governor of Montana: W. S. McCormack (Republican) (until month and day unknown), Frank A. Hazelbaker (Republican) (starting month and day unknown)
- Lieutenant Governor of Nebraska: George A. Williams (Republican)
- Lieutenant Governor of Nevada: Morley Griswold (Republican)
- Lieutenant Governor of New Mexico:
  - until January 1: Edward G. Sargent (Republican)
  - January 1-July: Hugh B. Woodward (Republican)
  - starting July: vacant
- Lieutenant Governor of New York: vacant (until January 1), Herbert H. Lehman (Democratic) (starting January 1)
- Lieutenant Governor of North Carolina: Jacob E. Long (Democratic) (until month and day unknown), Richard T. Fountain (Democratic) (starting month and day unknown)
- Lieutenant Governor of North Dakota: vacant (until January 9), John W. Carr (Republican) (starting January 9)
- Lieutenant Governor of Ohio: George C. Braden (Republican) (until January 14), John T. Brown (Republican) (starting January 14)
- Lieutenant Governor of Oklahoma: William J. Holloway (Democratic) (until March 21), vacant (starting March 21)
- Lieutenant Governor of Pennsylvania: Arthur H. James (Republican)
- Lieutenant Governor of Rhode Island: vacant (until month and day unknown), James G. Connolly (Republican) (starting month and day unknown)
- Lieutenant Governor of South Carolina: Thomas Bothwell Butler (Democratic)
- Lieutenant Governor of South Dakota:
  - until month and day unknown: Hyatt E. Covey (Republican)
  - month and day unknown: Clarence E. Coyne (Republican)
  - starting month and day unknown: John T. Grigsby (Democratic)
- Lieutenant Governor of Tennessee: vacant (until month and day unknown), Sam R. Bratton (Democratic) (starting month and day unknown)
- Lieutenant Governor of Texas: Barry Miller (Democratic)
- Lieutenant Governor of Vermont: vacant (until month and day unknown), Stanley C. Wilson (Republican) (starting month and day unknown)
- Lieutenant Governor of Virginia: Junius Edgar West (Democratic)
- Lieutenant Governor of Washington: W. Lon Johnson (Republican) (until January 16), John Arthur Gellatly (Republican) (starting January 16)
- Lieutenant Governor of Wisconsin: Henry A. Huber (Republican)

== Events ==
=== January–March ===
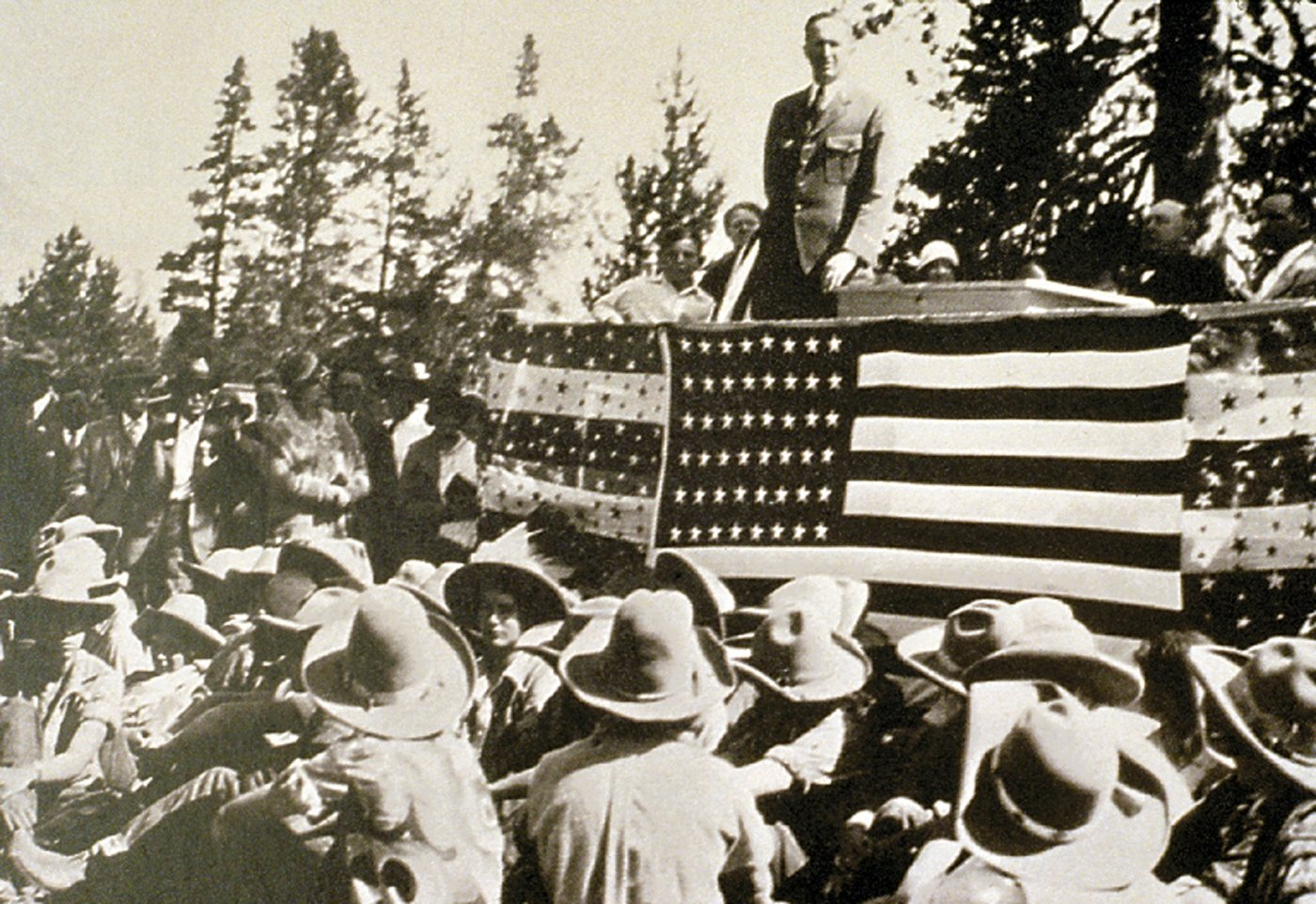
February 26: Grand Teton National Park was dedicated

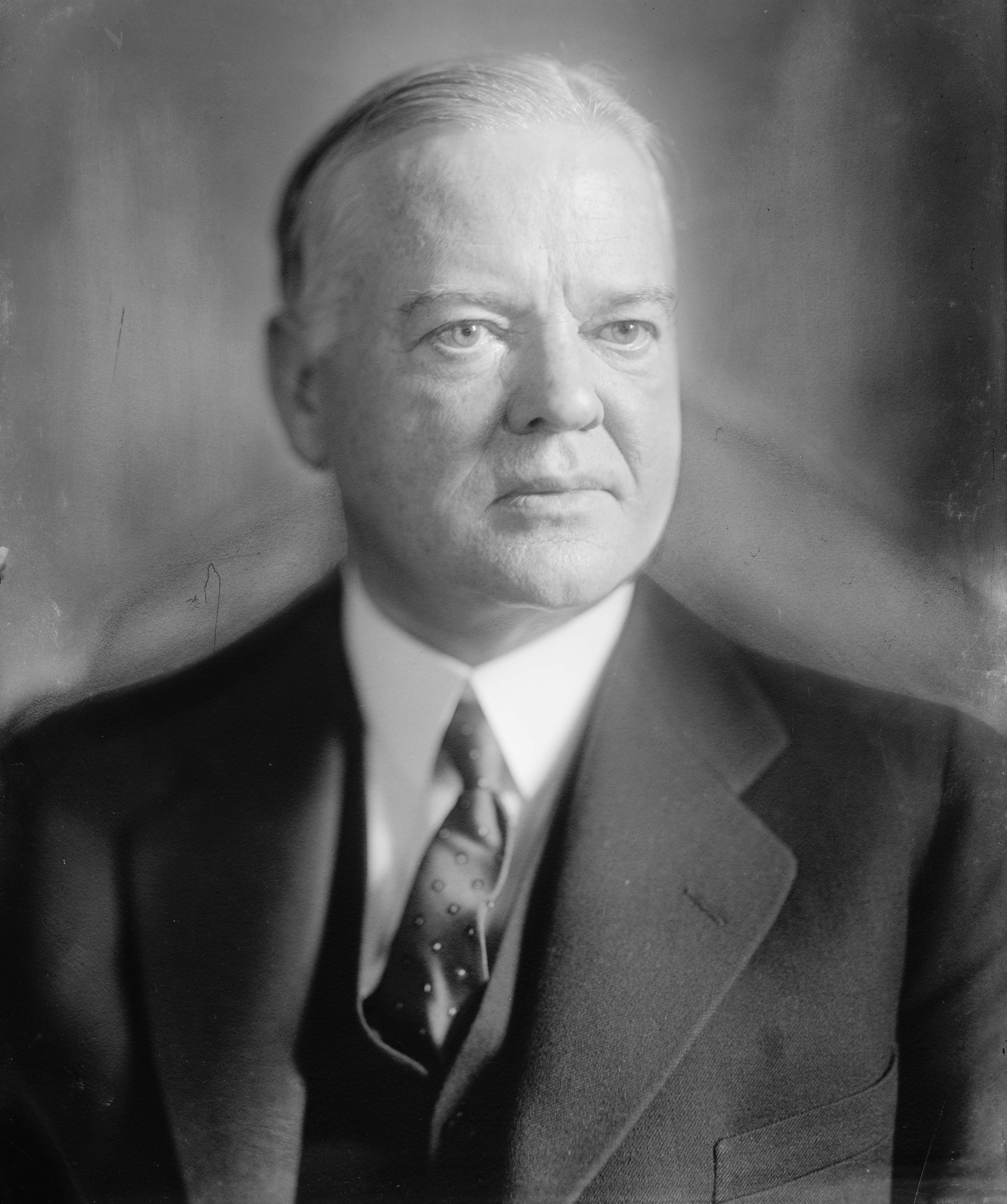
March 4: Herbert Hoover becomes the 31st U.S. president

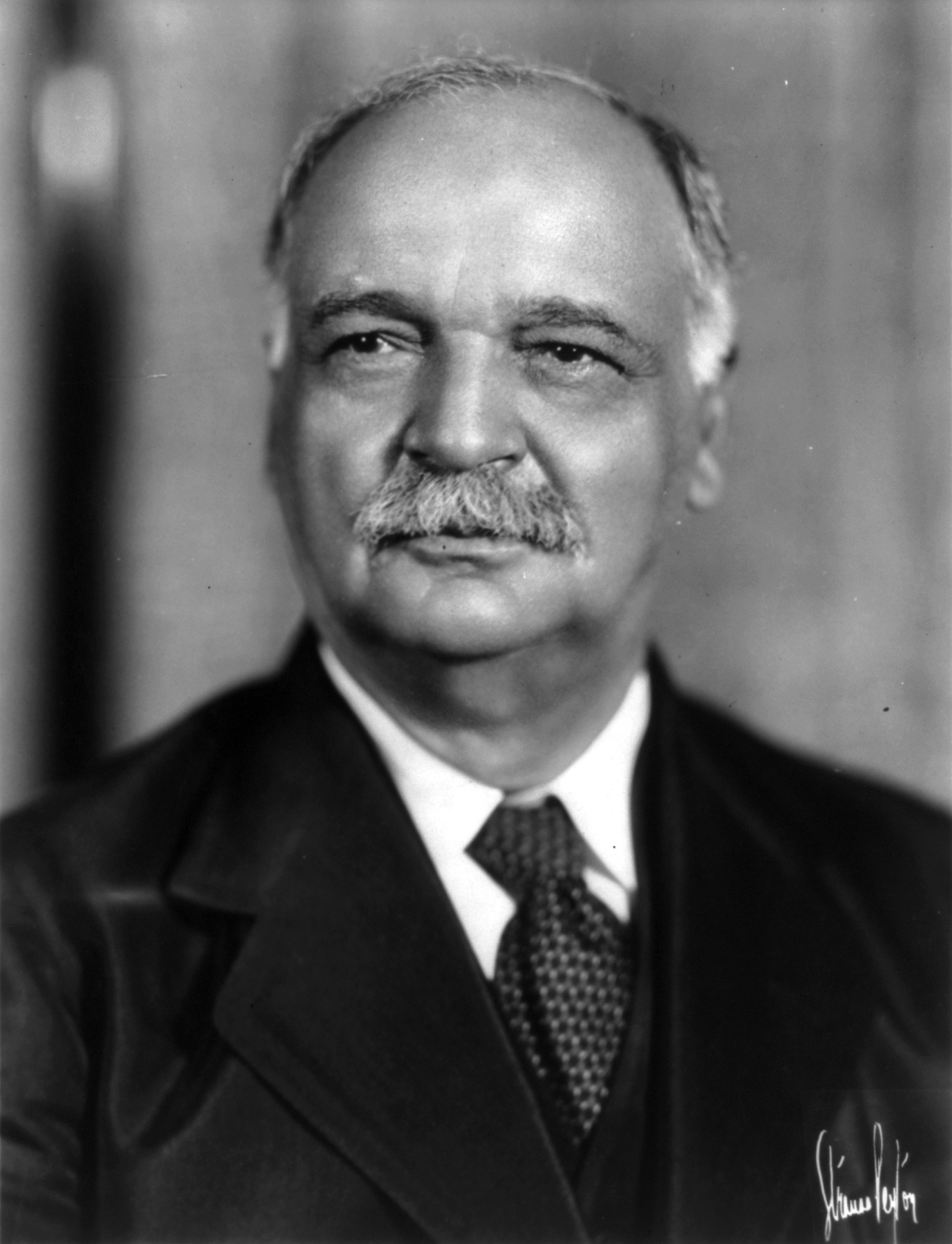
Charles Curtis becomes the 31st U.S. vice president

- January 1 – In college football, California loses to the Georgia Tech Yellow Jackets in the 27th Rose Bowl by a score of 8–7.
- January 29 – The Seeing Eye is established with the mission to train guide dogs to assist the blind, by Dorothy Harrison Eustis and Morris Frank in Nashville, Tennessee.
- February 11 – Eugene O'Neill's Dynamo premieres in New York.
- February 14 – St. Valentine's Day Massacre: Seven gangsters, rivals of Al Capone, are murdered in Chicago.
- February 26 – The Grand Teton National Park in Wyoming is established by Congress.
- March 4 – Herbert Hoover is sworn in as the 31st president of the United States, and Charles Curtis is sworn in as the 31st vice president.
- March 16 – A part-talkie film version of Show Boat, based on Edna Ferber's novel rather than the musical, premieres in Palm Beach (starring Laura La Plante and Joseph Schildkraut). It is critically panned and not successful at the box office.

=== April–June ===
- April 2–6 – The Bombing of Naco by Irish pilot Patrick Murphy, the first aerial assault on the United States by a foreign combatant
- May 13 – The National Crime Syndicate is founded in Atlantic City.
- May 15 – Cleveland Clinic Fire of 1929
  - A leak and explosion of methyl chloride refrigerant in a Cleveland hospital kills one hundred and twenty-eight and becomes regarded as the catalyst for the development of chlorofluorocarbon refrigerants.
- May 16 – The 1st Academy Awards are presented at the Hollywood Roosevelt Hotel in Hollywood, California, with William A. Wellman's Wings winning Academy Award for Best Picture. Joseph W. Farnham wins the only award ever given for Best Writing, Title Writing. Frank Borzage's 7th Heaven received the most nominations with five, while both it and F. W. Murnau's Sunrise jointly received the most awards with three.
- May 17 – Al Capone and his bodyguard are arrested for concealing deadly weapons.
- May 20 – The Wickersham Commission begins its investigation of alcohol prohibition in the United States.
- May 27 – United States v. Schwimmer decided in the Supreme Court affirms that pacifism is sufficient ground to deny an applicant citizenship of the United States.
- June 12 – Lou Hoover has tea at the White House with Jessie De Priest, wife of Oscar De Priest, the first black congressman of the 20th century.
- June 16 – Otto E. Funk, 62, ends his marathon walk (New York City to San Francisco, 4,165 miles in 183 days).
- June 21 – An agreement brokered by U.S. Ambassador Dwight Whitney Morrow ends the Cristero War in Mexico.
- June 27 – The first public demonstration of color television is held, by H. E. Ives and his colleagues at Bell Telephone Laboratories in New York City. The first images are a bouquet of roses and an American flag. A mechanical system is used to transmit 50-line color television images between New York and Washington, D.C.

=== July–September ===
- August 11 – The first Bud Billiken Parade and Picnic, the oldest and largest US African-American parade, is held in Chicago.
- August 19 – The radio comedy show Amos and Andy makes its debut, starring Freeman Gosden and Charles Correll.
- August 31 – The Young Plan, which sets the total World War I reparations owed by Germany at US$26,350,000,000 to be paid over a period of 58½ years, is finalized.
- September 3 – The Dow Jones Industrial Average (DJIA) peaks at 381.17, a height it will not reach again until November 1954.

=== October–December ===
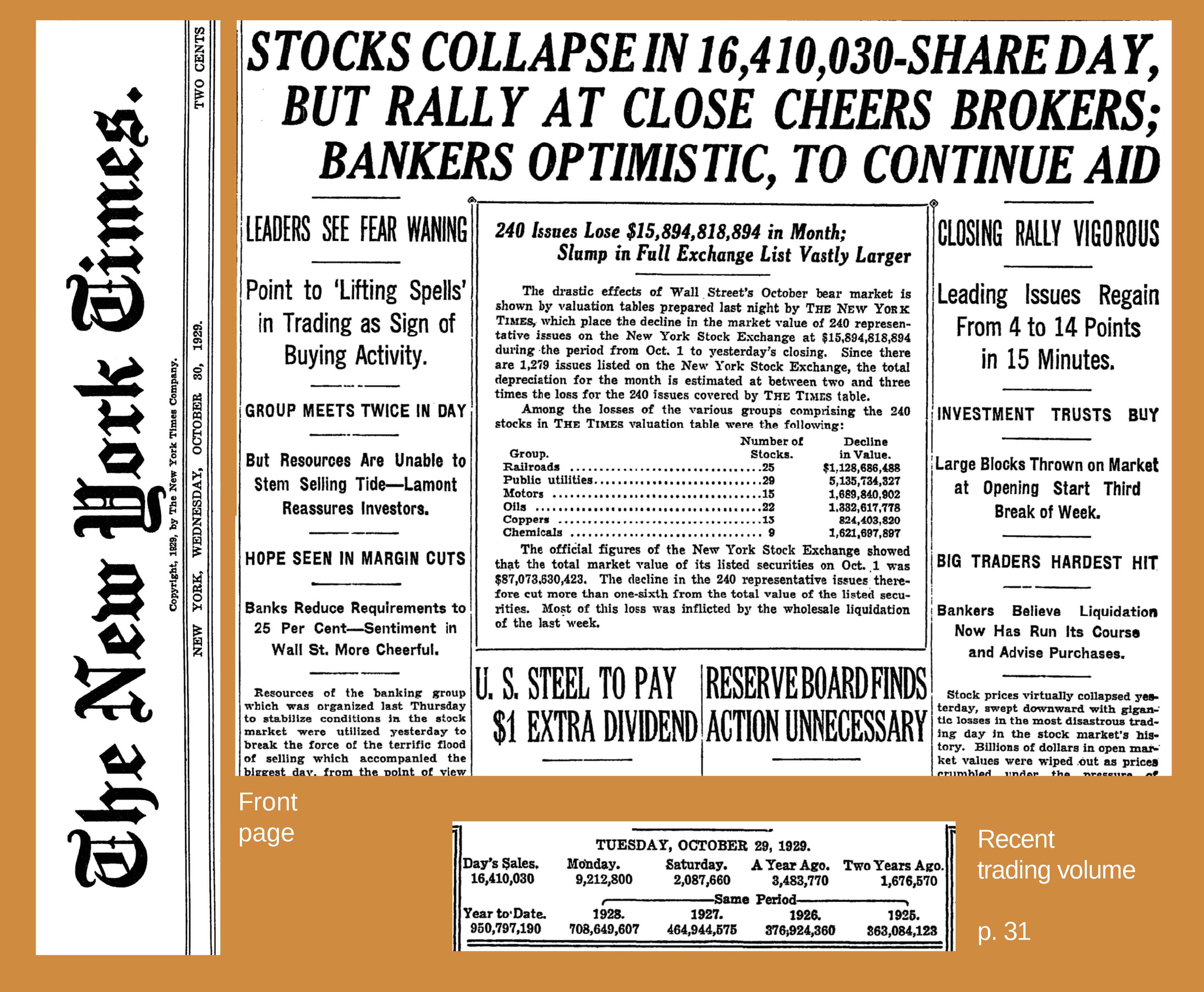
After large market declines on October 28 and 29, The New York Times described the financial community's response to "the most disastrous trading day in the stock market's history". Margin requirements were reduced to 25%, banking leaders expressed assurance of their support, and the sentiment on Wall Street was said to be "more cheerful" after earlier declines.

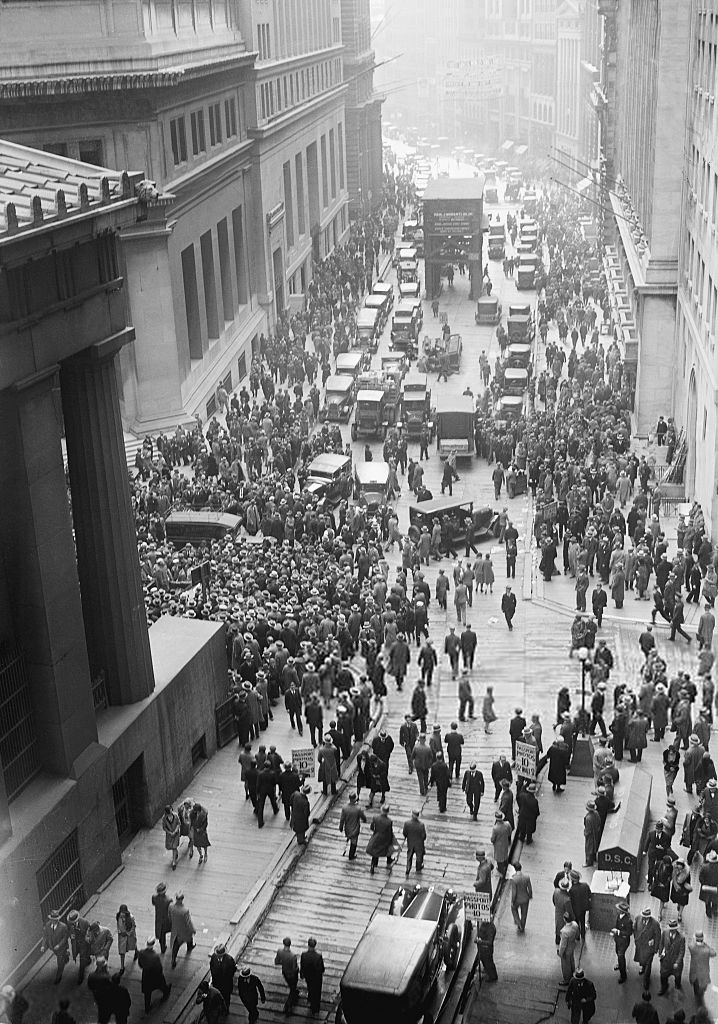
Crowd gathers during the Wall Street crash of 1929

- October 11 – J. C. Penney opens Store #1252 in Milford, Delaware, making it a nationwide company with department stores in all 48 states.
- October 14 – The Philadelphia Athletics defeat the Chicago Cubs, 4 games to 1, to win their 4th World Series Title.
- October 24–29 – Wall Street crash of 1929: Three multi-digit percentage drops wipe out more than $30 billion from the New York Stock Exchange (10 times greater than the annual budget of the federal government).
- October 24 – The Mount Hope Bridge, connecting Portsmouth to Bristol in Rhode Island, opens to traffic.
- October 25 – Former U.S. Interior Secretary Albert B. Fall is convicted of bribery for his role in the Teapot Dome scandal, becoming the first presidential cabinet member to go to prison for actions in office.
- November 7 – The Museum of Modern Art in New York City opens to the public.
- November 29 – Bernt Balchen, U.S. Admiral Richard Byrd, Captain Ashley McKinley, and Harold June, become the first to fly over the South Pole.
- December 3 – Great Depression: U.S. President Herbert Hoover announces to the U.S. Congress that the worst effects of the recent stock market crash are behind the nation, and that the American people have regained faith in the economy.
- December 11 – Pathé Studios fire in Manhattan kills 11.

=== Undated ===
- Sunglasses mass-produced from celluloid are first made by Foster Grant for sale in Austin, Texas.

=== Ongoing ===
- Lochner era (c. 1897–c. 1937)
- On the roof gang, group of cryptologists and radiomen during World War II (1928–1941)
- U.S. occupation of Haiti (1915–1934)
- Prohibition (1920–1933)
- Roaring Twenties (1920–1929)

== Sport ==
- March 29 – For the first time in Stanley Cup history two American teams face off for hockey's ultimate prize when the Boston Bruins defeat the New York Rangers 2 games to 0 for the Bruins first Stanley Cup victory. The deciding game is played in New York City's Madison Square Garden.

== Births ==
=== January ===
- January 1 – Joseph Lombardo, American mafioso (d. 2019)
- January 3
  - Marilyn Lloyd, American politician and businesswoman (d. 2018)
  - Gordon Moore, American computing entrepreneur, inventor of Moore's Law (d. 2023)
- January 4 – Darrell Mudra, American football coach (d. 2022)
- January 5
  - Wilbert Harrison, American singer-songwriter and guitarist (d. 1994)
  - Robert K. Massie, American journalist and historian (d. 2019)
  - Al Worthington, American baseball pitcher (d. 2026)
- January 7 – Terry Moore, American actress
- January 8 – Gerry Spence, American lawyer and author (d. 2025)
- January 9 – Tom Riley, American lawyer and politician (d. 2011)
- January 13
  - Joe Pass, American jazz guitarist (d. 1994)
  - Moe Savransky, American baseball player (d. 2022)
- January 14 – Billy Walker, American country music singer (d. 2006)
- January 15 – Martin Luther King Jr., African-American civil rights leader, Nobel laureate (d. 1968)
- January 17
  - Eilaine Roth, American professional baseball player (d. 2011)
  - Elaine Roth, American professional baseball player (d. 2007)
- January 19 – Red Amick, American race car driver (d. 1995)
- January 20
  - Jimmy Cobb, American jazz drummer (d. 2020)
  - Arte Johnson, American comedian and actor (d. 2019)
  - Frank Kush, American football player and coach (d. 2017)
- January 21 – Rolando Hinojosa-Smith, American writer and literary scholar (d. 2022)
- January 25 – Benny Golson, American jazz musician (d. 2024)
- January 26 – Jules Feiffer, American cartoonist and author (d. 2025)
- January 27 – Richard Ottinger, American politician (d. 2026)
- January 28 – Edith M. Flanigen, American chemist (d. 2026)
- January 30 – Morton Stevens, American film score composer (d. 1991)

=== February ===
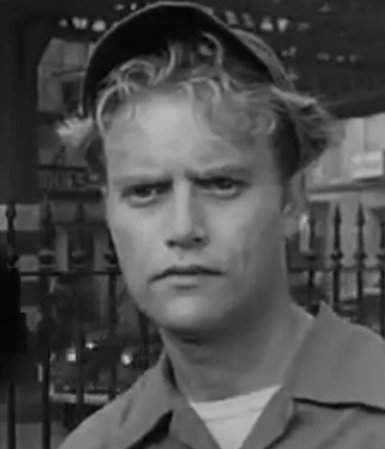
Vic Morrow

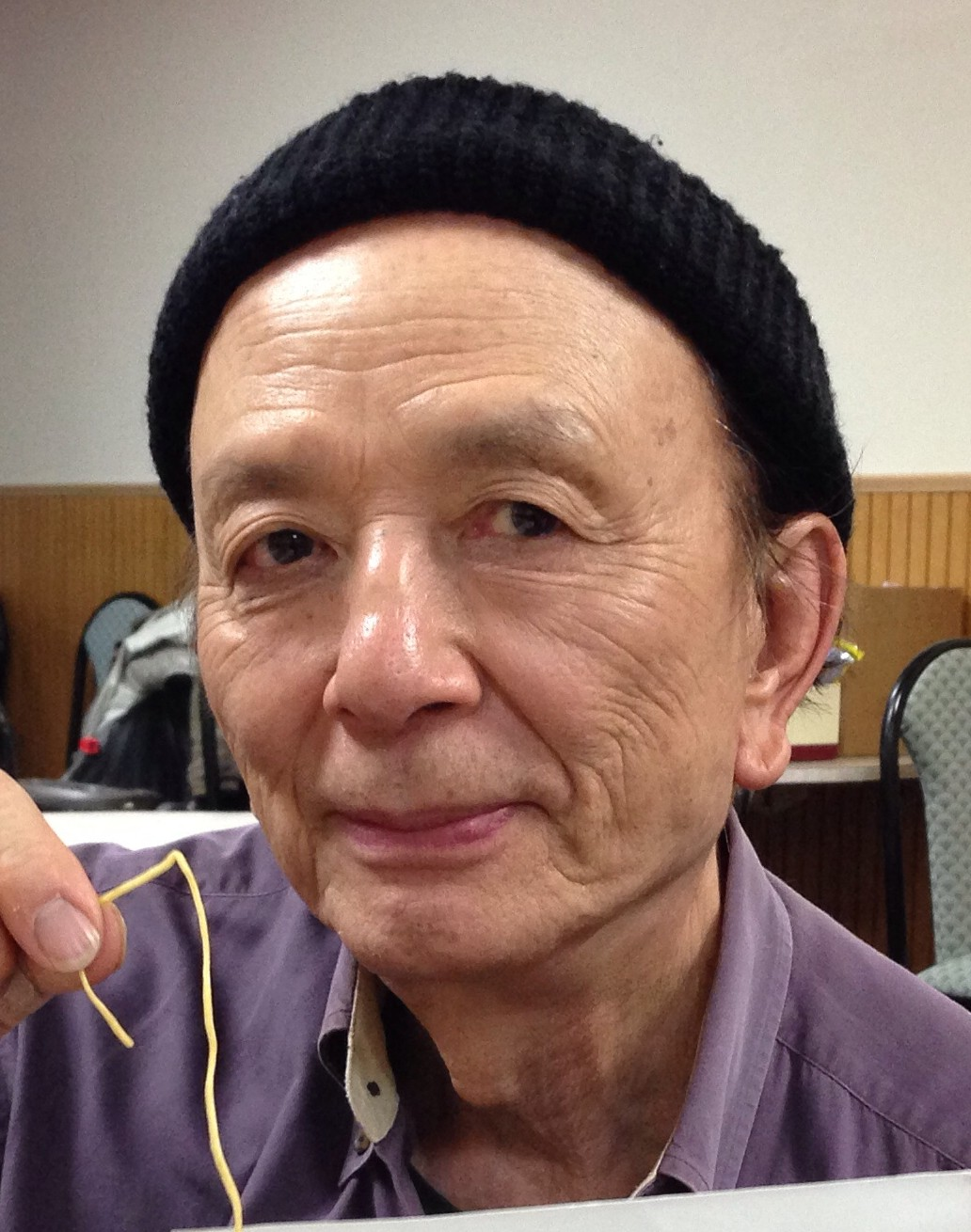
James Hong

- February 1 – Stuart Whitman, American film, television actor (d. 2020)
- February 2 – John Henry Holland, American computer scientist (d. 2015)
- February 3 – Huntington Hardisty, American admiral (d. 2003)
- February 4
  - Jerry Adler, American actor (d. 2025)
  - Stanley Drucker, American clarinetist (d. 2022)
  - Thomas H. Paterniti, American politician (d. 2017)
- February 5 – Hal Blaine, American drummer and session musician (d. 2019)
- February 6 – Chuck Nergard, American politician (d. 2017)
- February 10
  - Jerry Goldsmith, American composer and conductor (d. 2004)
  - Jim Whittaker, mountaineer
  - Lou Whittaker, mountaineer (d. 2024)
- February 14
  - Vic Morrow, American actor, director (d. 1982)
  - James Nelligan, American politician
- February 15
  - Bob Moore, American food executive (d. 2024)
  - James R. Schlesinger, American politician (d. 2014)
- February 22
  - James Hong, Chinese-American actor, director
  - Rebecca Schull, American actress
- February 28 – Hayden Fry, American football player and coach (d. 2019)

=== March ===
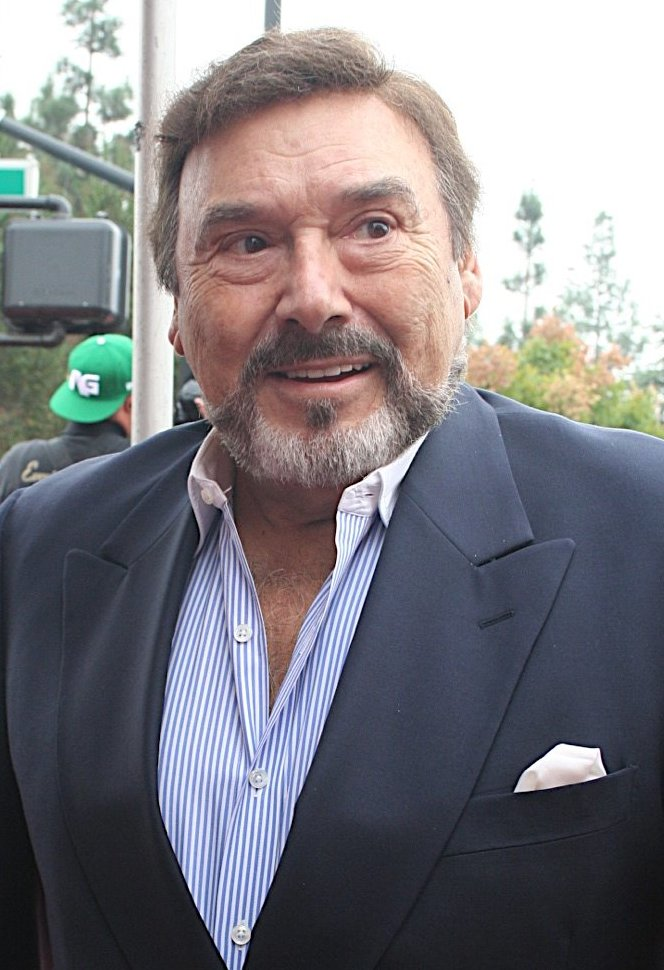
Joseph Mascolo

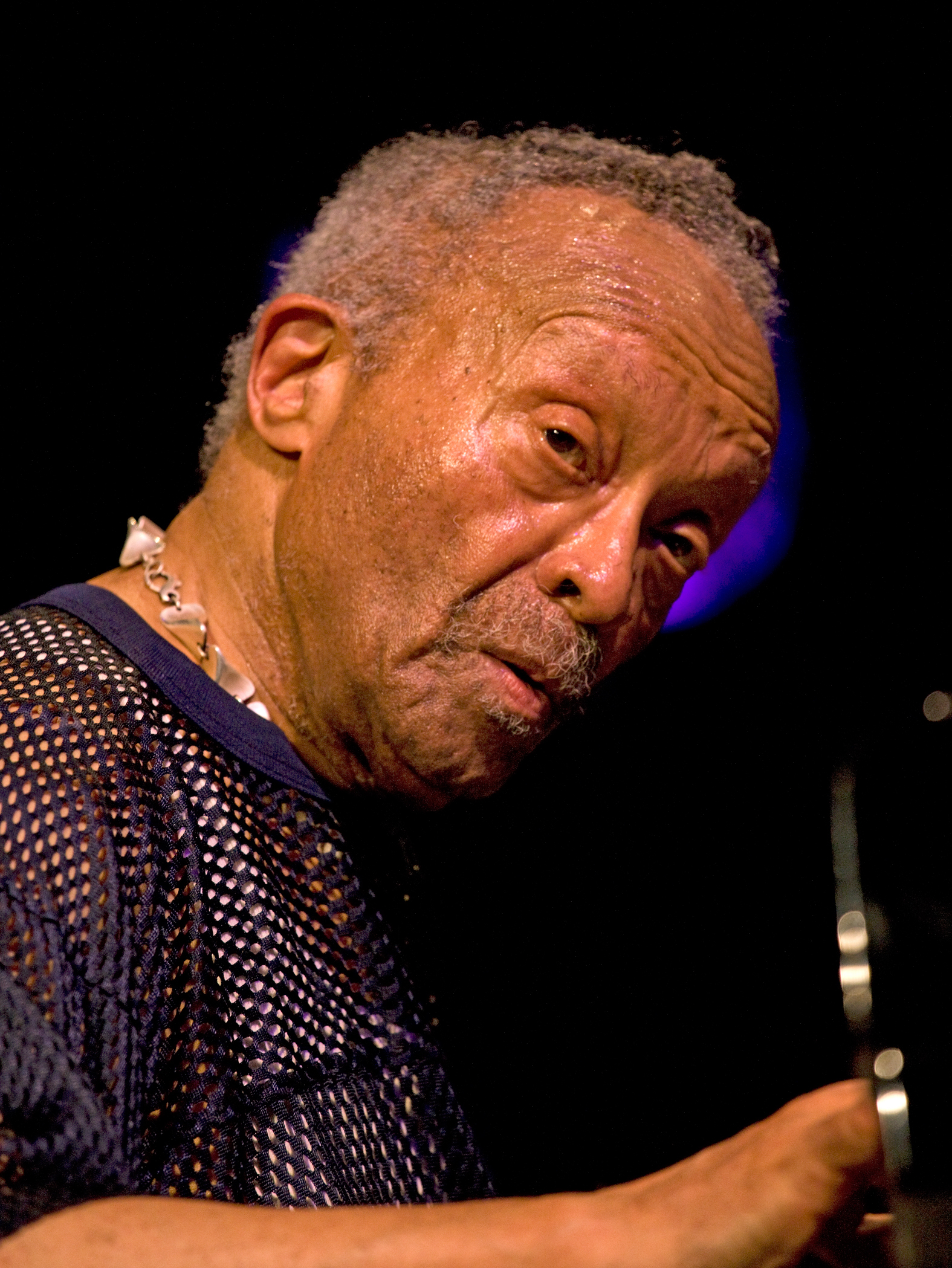
Cecil Taylor

- March 1 – Lynwood E. Clark, American Air Force lieutenant general
- March 6 – Gale McArthur, American basketball player (d. 2020)
- March 7 – Marion Marlowe, American singer and actress (d. 2012)
- March 8
  - Elaine Edwards, American politician (d. 2018)
  - Nicodemo Scarfo, American mafioso (d. 2017)
- March 9 – Jay Weston, American film producer and restaurant critic (d. 2023)
- March 11 – Hugh Newell Jacobsen, American architect (d. 2021)
- March 13
  - Peter Breck, American actor (d. 2012 in Canada)
  - Joseph Mascolo, American musician, actor (d. 2016)
- March 14
  - Michael D. Coe, archaeologist, anthropologist, epigrapher and author (d. 2019)
  - Bob Goalby, golfer (d. 2022)
- March 16 – Betty Johnson, singer (d. 2022)
- March 17 – Howie Winter, gang boss (d. 2020)
- March 19 – Michael M. Ryan, American actor (d. 2017)
- March 25
  - Harris W. Fawell, American politician (d. 2021)
  - Cecil Taylor, African-American jazz pianist, composer, and poet (d. 2018)
- March 26 – Edward Sorel, American illustrator and caricaturist
- March 27
  - Rita Briggs, American baseball player (d. 1994)
  - Don Warden, American country musician and manager (d. 2017)
- March 29 – Richard Lewontin, American biologist, geneticist and academic (d. 2021)
- March 31 – Bert Fields, American lawyer and author (d. 2022)

=== April ===
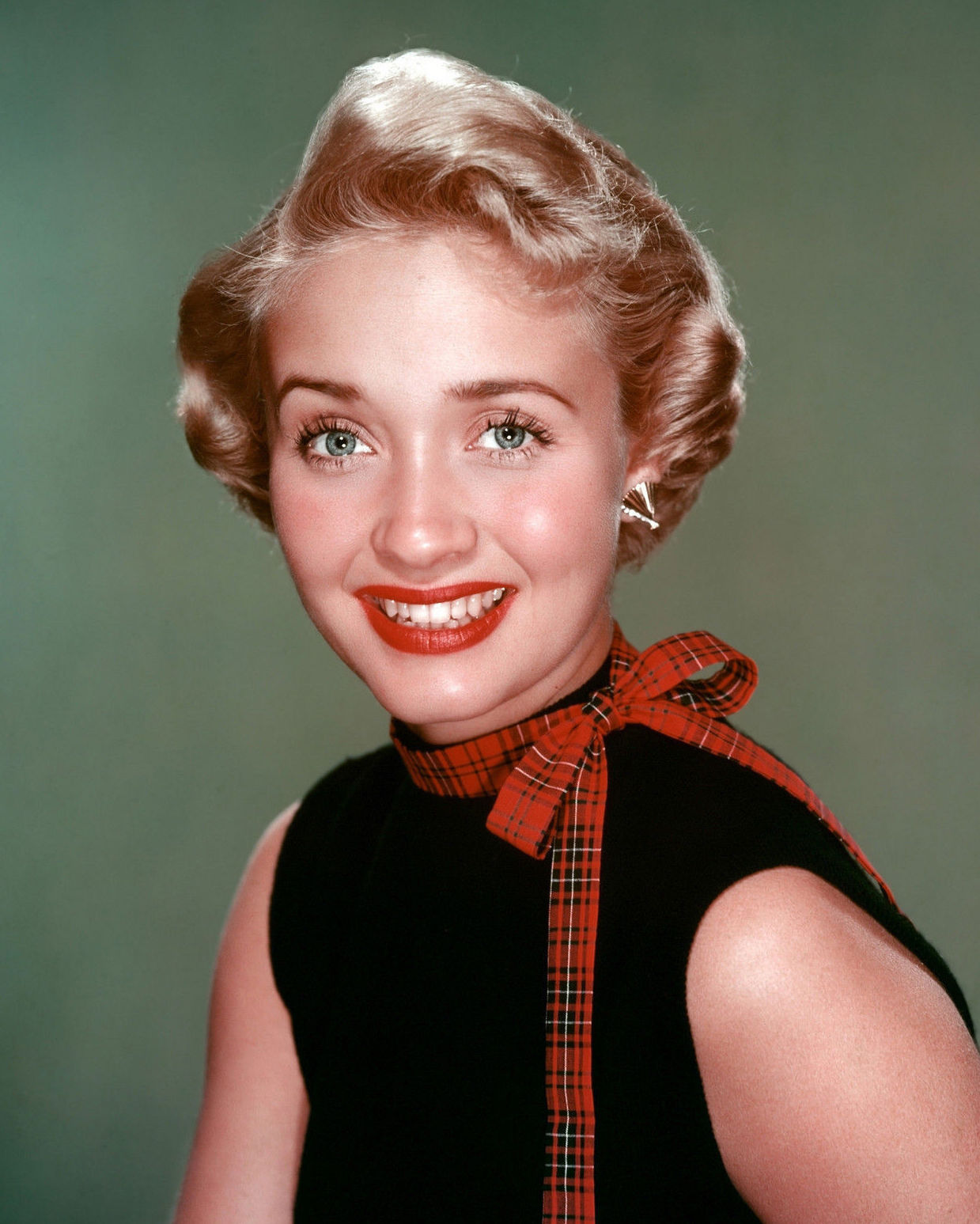
Jane Powell

- April 1
  - Jane Powell, actress, singer, dancer (d. 2021)
  - Bo Schembechler, American football player and coach (d. 2006)
- April 2
  - Ed Dorn, poet (d. 1999)
  - Frank Farrar, governor of South Dakota (d. 2021)
- April 4
  - William F. Clinger Jr., politician (d. 2021)
  - John Dee Holeman, Piedmont Blues musician (d. 2021)
- April 5 – Richard Jenrette, businessman (d. 2018)
- April 6 – Joi Lansing, actress (d. 1972)
- April 8 – Morton B. Panish, physical chemist
- April 9 – Paule Marshall, novelist (d. 2019)
- April 12
  - Tony Douglas, country music singer (d. 2013)
  - Dale Haupt, American football coach (d. 2018)
- April 13 – Yvonne Clark, engineer (d. 2019)
- April 16
  - Dorne Dibble, American football player (d. 2018)
  - Roy Hamilton, African-American singer (d. 1969)
- April 20 – John Andreason, politician (d. 2017)
- April 27 – Michael Harner, anthropologist, author (d. 2018)
- April 29
  - Tom Cornsweet, psychologist (d. 2017)
  - Billy Mize, steel guitarist, band leader, vocalist, songwriter, TV show host (d. 2017)
  - April Stevens, singer (d. 2023)
- April 30 – Beverly LaHaye, conservative activist (d. 2024)

=== May ===
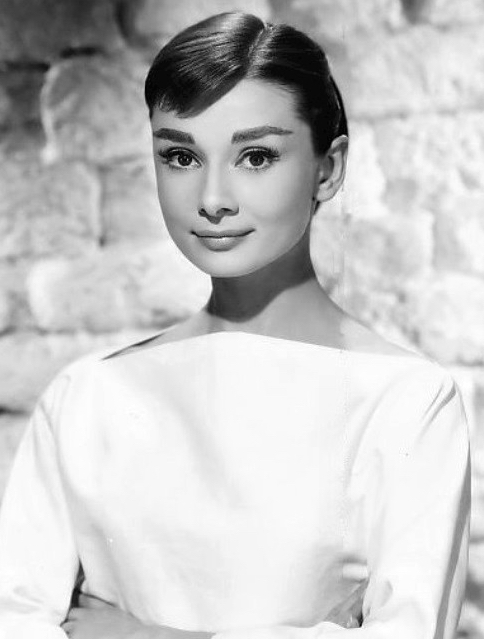
Audrey Hepburn

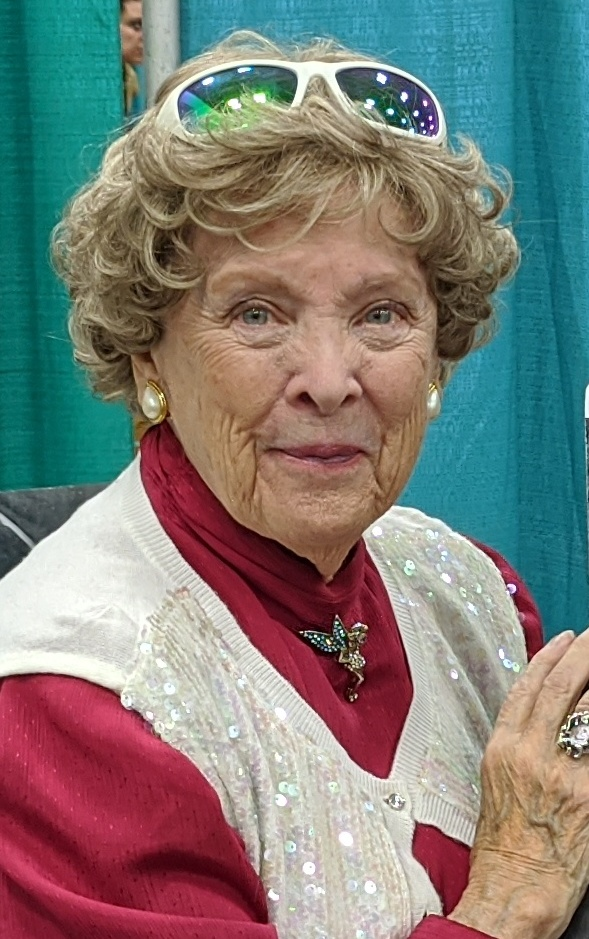
Margaret Kerry

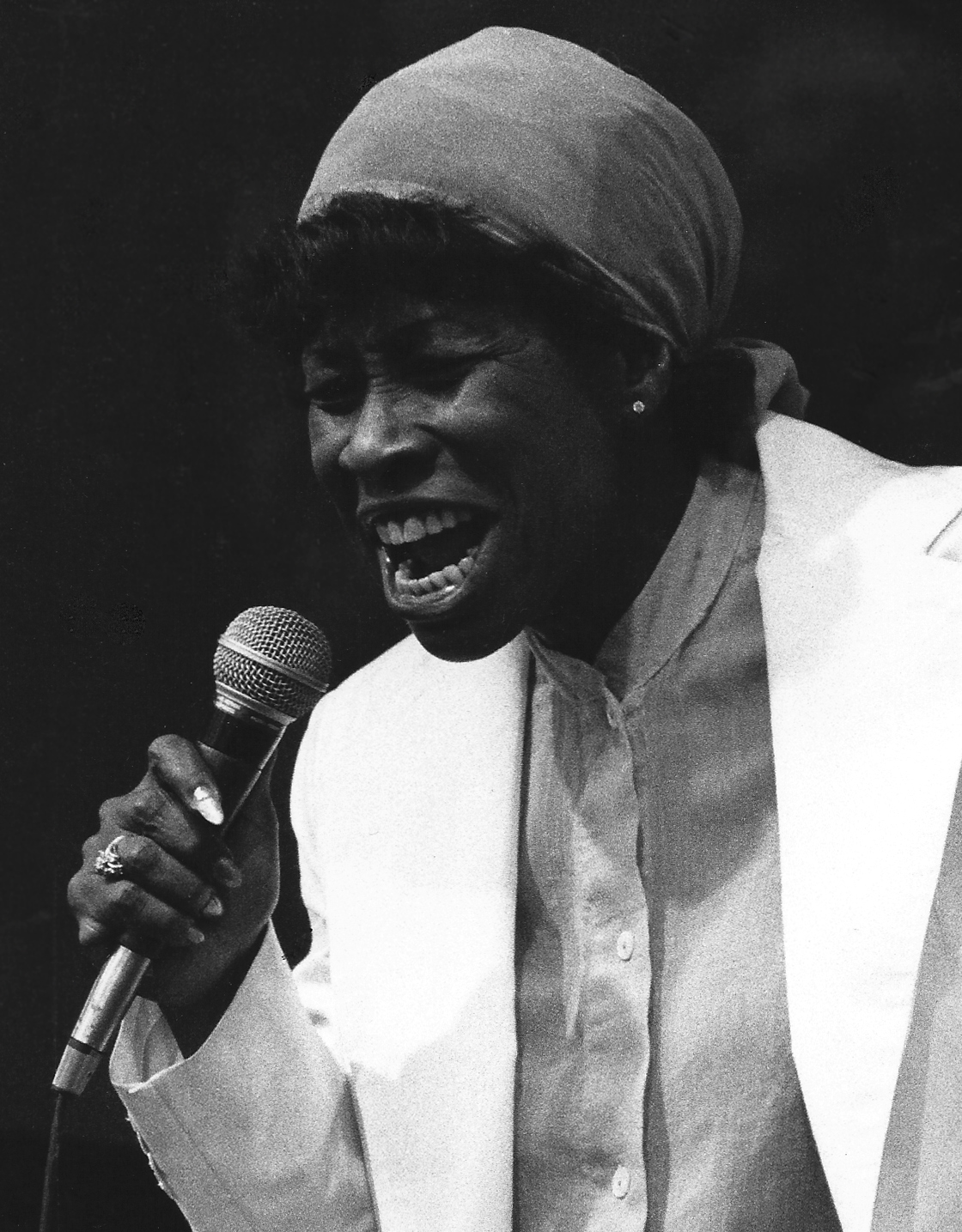
Betty Carter

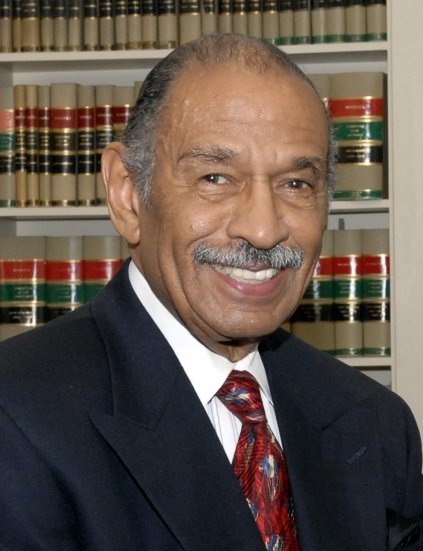
John Conyers

- May 2 – Link Wray, rock and roll musician (d. 2005)
- May 3
  - Denise Lor, popular music singer, actress (d. 2015)
  - Emily Anne Staples, American politician (d. 2018)
- May 4
  - Audrey Hepburn, Belgian-born actress and humanitarian (d. 1993 in Switzerland)
  - Sydney Lamb, American linguist
  - Paige Rense, American writer and editor (d. 2021)
- May 5 – Ilene Woods, American singer, actress (d. 2010)
- May 6 – Paul Lauterbur, American chemist, Nobel laureate (d. 2007)
- May 7
  - Sally Liberman Smith, American educator (d. 2007)
  - Dick Williams, American baseball player (d. 2011)
- May 8
  - Ethel D. Allen, African-American Secretary of the Commonwealth of Pennsylvania and physician (d. 1981)
  - John C. Bogle, American investor (d. 2019)
  - Jane Roberts, American writer (d. 1984)
- May 10 – Betty Foss, American female professional baseball player (d. 1998)
- May 11 – Margaret Kerry, American actress, dancer, and motivational speaker
- May 12 – Bernard Marcus, American businessman (d. 2024)
- May 15
  - Frank Heart, American computer engineer (d. 2018)
  - William Luers, American diplomat and museum executive (d. 2025)
- May 16
  - Betty Carter, African-American jazz singer (d. 1998)
  - John Conyers, African-American politician (d. 2019)
  - Adrienne Rich, American poet, essayist (d. 2012)
- May 18 – Walter Pitman, American educator, politician (d. 2018)
- May 21 – Charles Wadsworth, American music promoter (d. 2025)
- May 22 – Neave Brown, American-British architect (d. 2018 in the United Kingdom)
- May 25 – Beverly Sills, American operatic soprano, director of the New York City Opera (d. 2007)
- May 27 – Thomas E. Brennan, American jurist (d. 2018)
- May 29 – Harry Frankfurt, American philosopher (d. 2023)
- May 30 – Marshall Loeb, American business journalist (d. 2017)

=== June ===
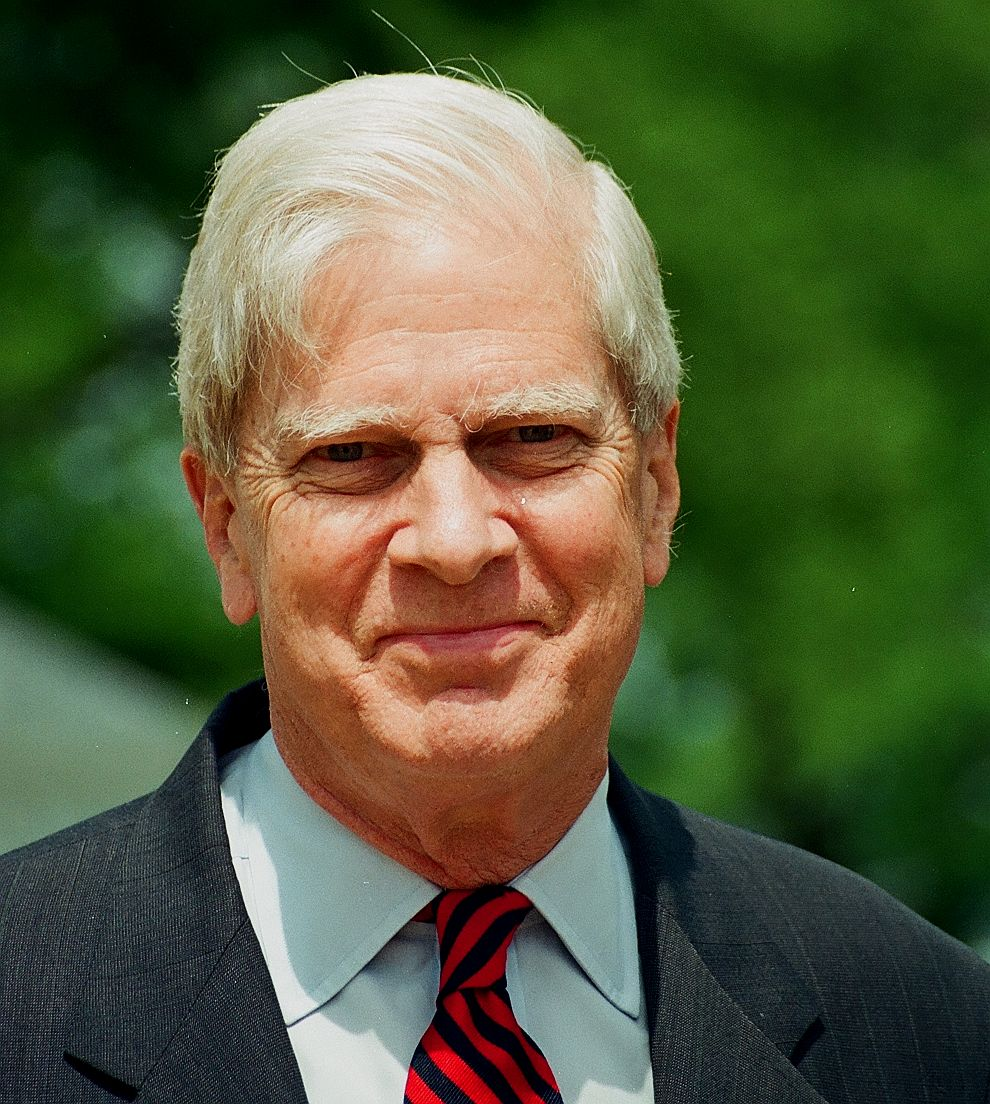
James H. Billington

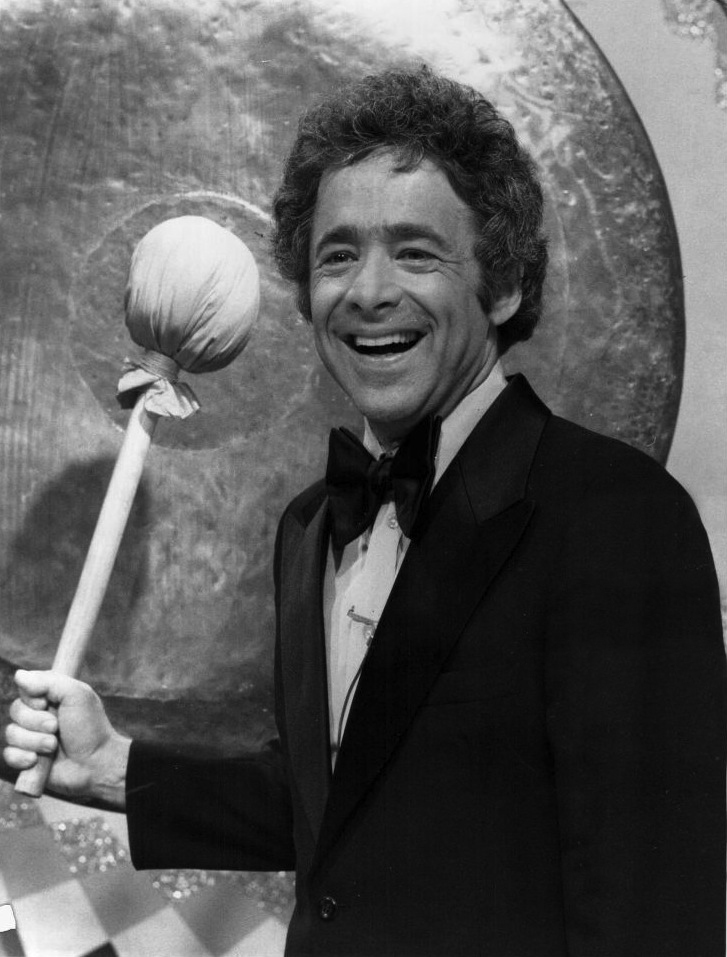
Chuck Barris

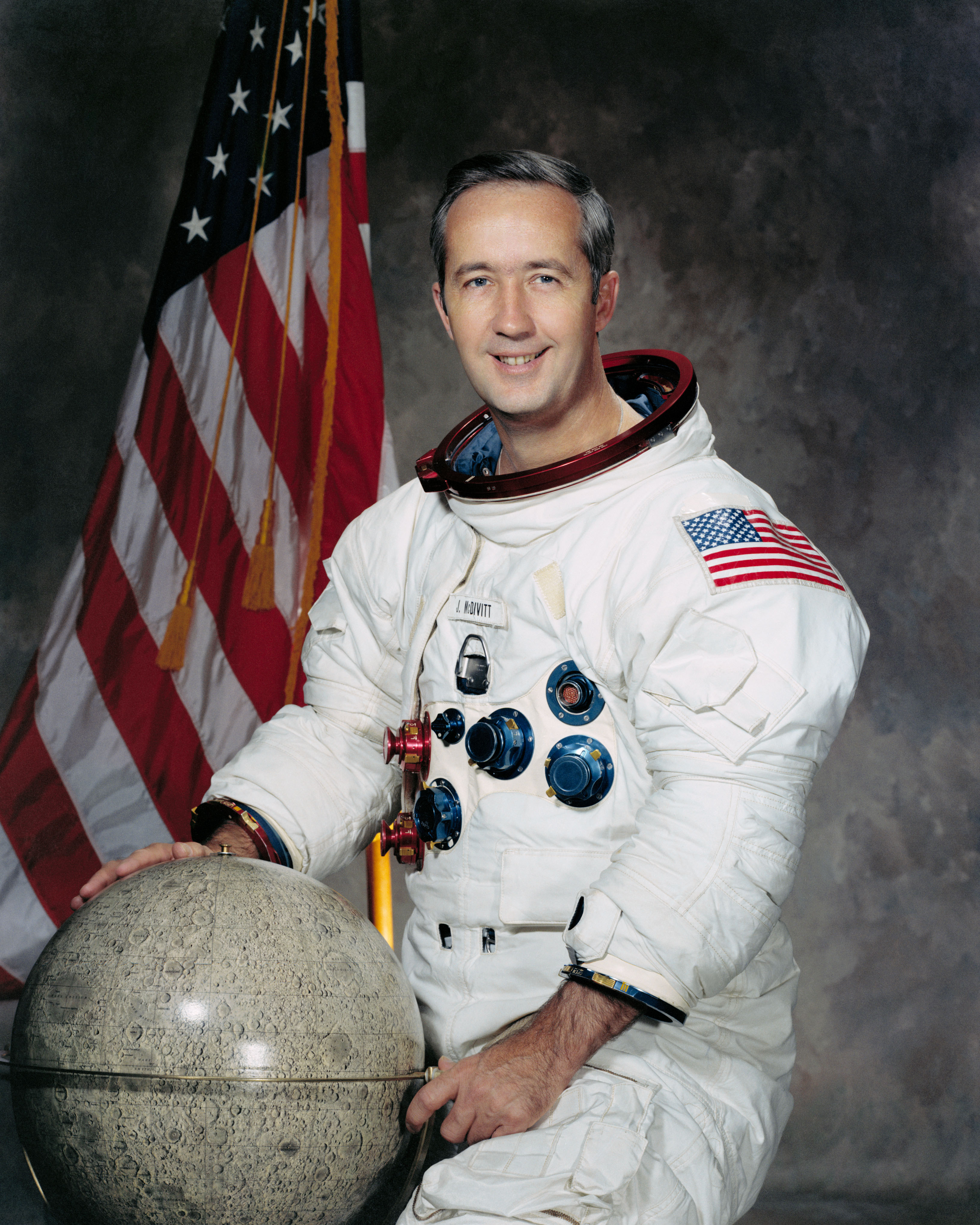
James McDivitt

- June 1
  - James H. Billington, American academic and author (d. 2018)
  - Chuck Ortmann, American football player (d. 2018)
- June 2 – Norton Juster, American writer and academic (d. 2021)
- June 3 – Chuck Barris, American television game show host, producer (d. 2017)
- June 6 – Mary Hatcher, American soprano, actress (d. 2018)
- June 8 – Marion Marshall, American actress (d. 2018)
- June 9 – Johnny Ace, African-American rhythm and blues singer (d. 1954)
- June 10
  - James McDivitt, American astronaut (d. 2022)
  - Grace Mirabella, American fashion journalist (d. 2021)
  - E. O. Wilson, American biologist (d. 2021)
- June 11 – Frank Thomas, American baseball player (d. 2023)
- June 16 – Paul Cain, American Pentecostal Christian evangelist (d. 2019)
- June 20 – Bonnie Bartlett, American actress
- June 21
  - Bob Gain, American football player (d. 2016)
  - Stephen B. Wiley, American politician (d. 2015)
- June 22 – Alex P. Garcia, American politician (d. 1999)
- June 23
  - June Carter Cash, American singer (d. 2003)
  - Gail Peters, American competition swimmer
  - Gerald Eustis Thomas, American naval officer, diplomat and academic (d. 2019)
- June 24
  - Vic Carrabotta, American comic-book artist, advertising art director (d. 2022)
  - Connie Hall, American country music singer (d. 2021)
  - Carolyn S. Shoemaker, American astronomer (d. 2021)
- June 25 – Eric Carle, American designer, illustrator and writer (d. 2021)
- June 26 – Milton Glaser, American graphic designer, illustrator and teacher (d. 2020)
- June 27 – J. C. Duncan, politician
- June 28 – Glenn D. Paige, political scientist (d. 2017)
- June 29
  - Pat Crawford Brown, actress (d. 2019)
  - Pete George, weightlifter (d. 2021)

=== July ===
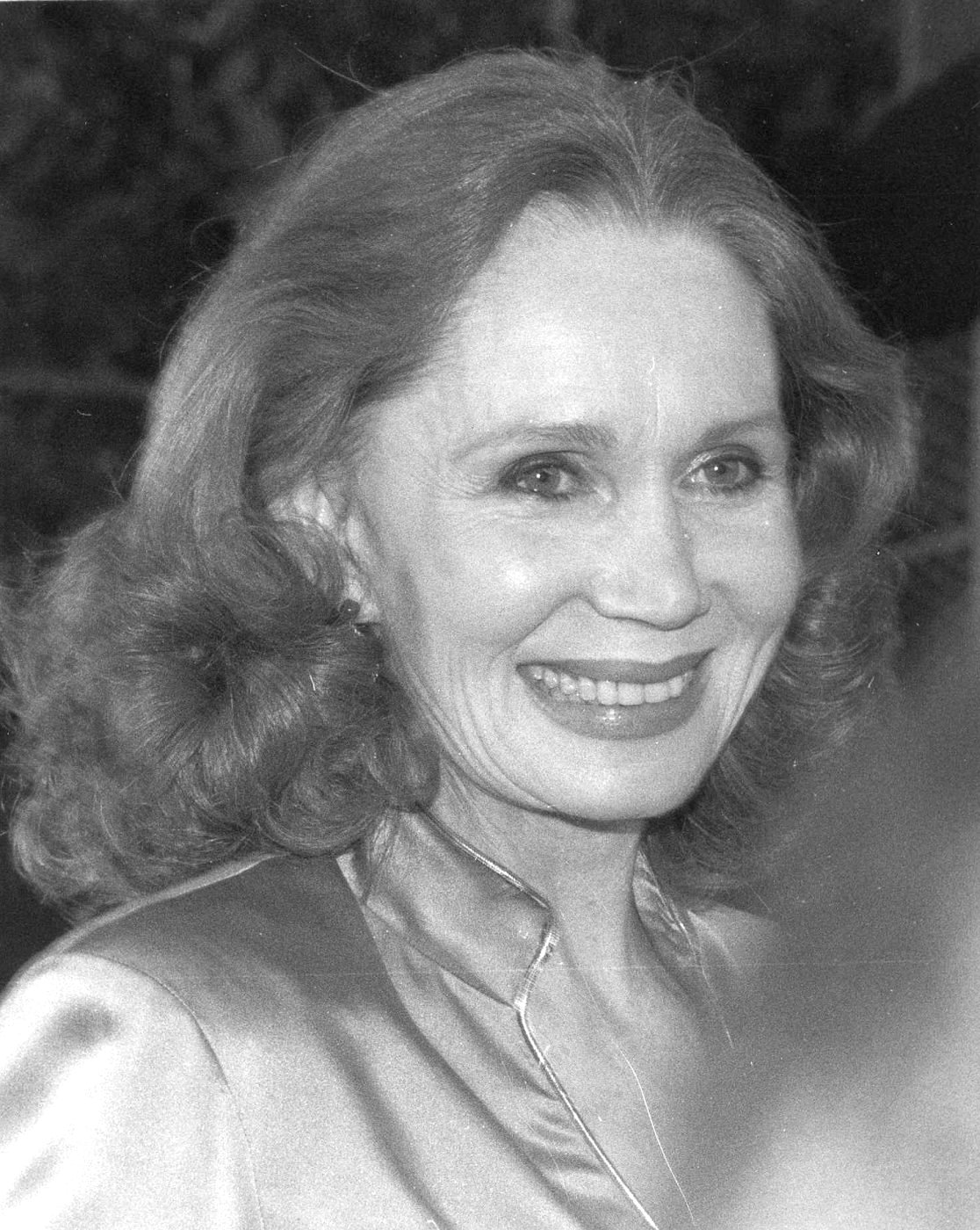
Katherine Helmond

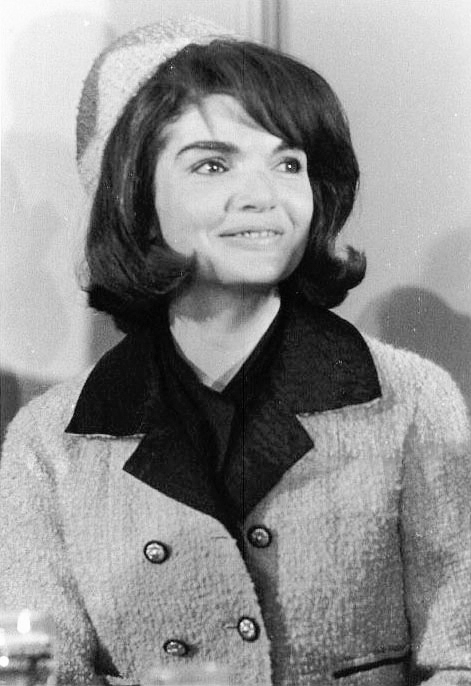
Jacqueline Kennedy Onassis

- July 1 – Gerald Edelman, American biologist, Nobel laureate (d. 2014)
- July 3
  - Joanne Herring, American socialite, businesswoman, political activist, philanthropist, diplomat, and former television talk show host
  - Lavelle White, American Texas blues and soul blues singer, songwriter
- July 4
  - Peter Angelos, American trial lawyer (d. 2024)
  - Bill Tremel, American professional baseball player (d. 2013)
- July 5 – Katherine Helmond, American actress (d. 2019)
- July 6 – Angelo LiPetri, American former professional baseball player (d. 2016)
- July 8 – Shirley Ann Grau, American writer (d. 2020)
- July 9 – Jesse McReynolds, American bluegrass musician (d. 2023)
- July 10 – John Glenn, Major League Baseball outfielder (d. 2023)
- July 12 – Monte Hellman, director (d. 2021)
- July 11 – Sandy Frank, American television producer, distributor, and marketer of TV shows
- July 14 – Pat Scott, American pitcher (d. 2016)
- July 15 – Walter Hirsch, American basketball player (d. 2022)
- July 17 – Arthur Frommer, American writer, publisher and consumer advocate (d. 2024)
- July 18 – Dick Button, American figure skater (d. 2024)
- July 19 – Alice Pollitt, American female professional baseball player (d. 2016)
- July 21
  - Antonia Handler Chayes, American lawyer, educator
  - Paul V. Gadola, American judge (d. 2014)
- July 23 – Robert Quackenbush, American author and children's illustrator (d. 2021)
- July 26 – Patrick Flores, American Roman Catholic prelate (d. 2017)
- July 28 – Jacqueline Kennedy Onassis, American socialite, conservationist, 35th First Lady of the United States (d. 1994)
- July 31 – Don Murray, American actor (d. 2024)

=== August ===
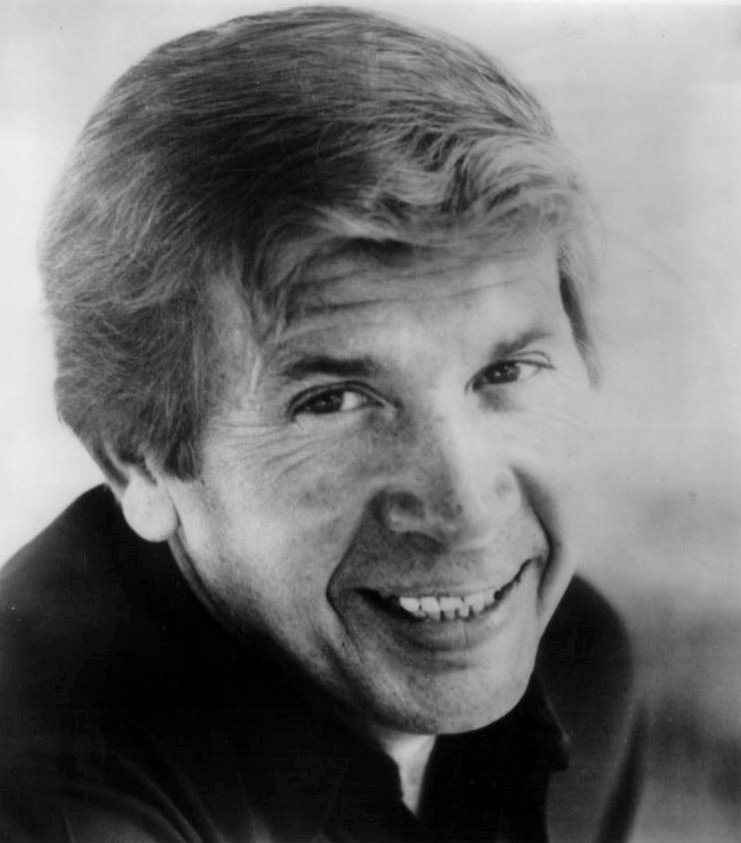
Buck Owens

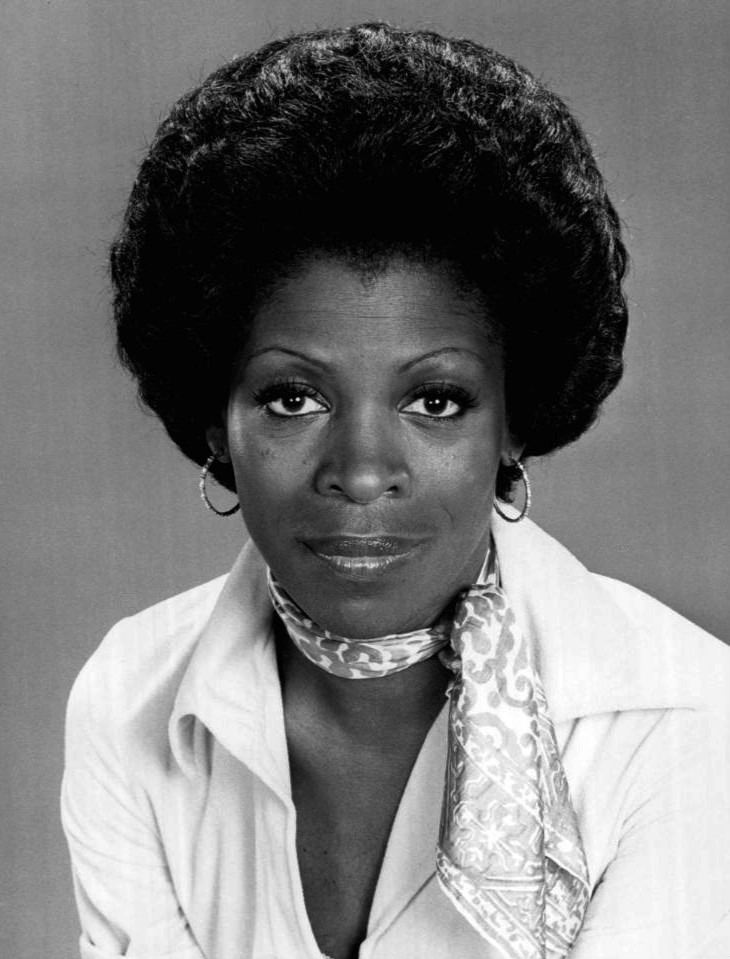
Roxie Roker

- August 1 – Samuel Charters, American writer, music historian and record producer (d. 2015)
- August 2 – Irwin Fridovich, American biochemist (d. 2019)
- August 4 – Joe Pignatano, American baseball player and coach (d. 2022)
- August 7
  - Jo Baer, American artist (d. 2025)
  - Don Larsen, American baseball player (d. 2020)
  - Dick Schulze, American politician
- August 9 – Fred Fredericks, American cartoonist (d. 2015)
- August 10 – Vincent McEveety, director, producer (d. 2018)
- August 12 – Buck Owens, singer, bandleader, and TV host (d. 2006)
- August 13 – Pat Harrington Jr., voice actor (d. 2016)
- August 14
  - Thomas Meehan, playwright (d. 2017)
  - Louise Slaughter, politician (d. 2018)
- August 15
  - Louise Shivers, writer (d. 2014)
  - Marcia Hafif, painter (d. 2018)
- August 16 – Fritz Von Erich, wrestler (d. 1997)
- August 17
  - Francis Gary Powers, U-2 spy plane pilot (d. 1977)
  - Rex White, auto racer and NASCAR champion (d. 2025)
- August 21
  - John McMartin, American actor (d. 2016)
  - Marie Severin, comics artist and colorist (d. 2018)
- August 22 – Roy Clay, American computer scientist (d. 2024)
- August 23 – Vera Miles, American actress
- August 24 – Betty Dodson, American sex educator (d. 2020)
- August 26 – Chuck Renslow, American businessman, LGBT activist (d. 2017)
- August 27 – Ralph T. Coe, American art historian of Native American art (d. 2010)
- August 28 – Roxie Roker, African-American actress (d. 1995)
- August 29 – Yale Kamisar, American legal scholar (d. 2022)
- August 31 – C. C. Torbert Jr., American jurist (d. 2018)

=== September ===
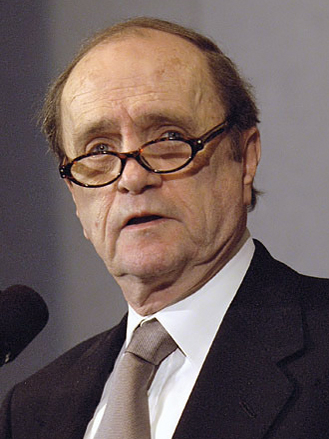
Bob Newhart

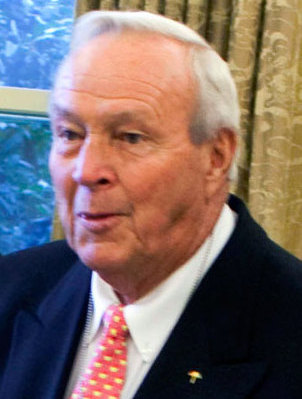
Arnold Palmer

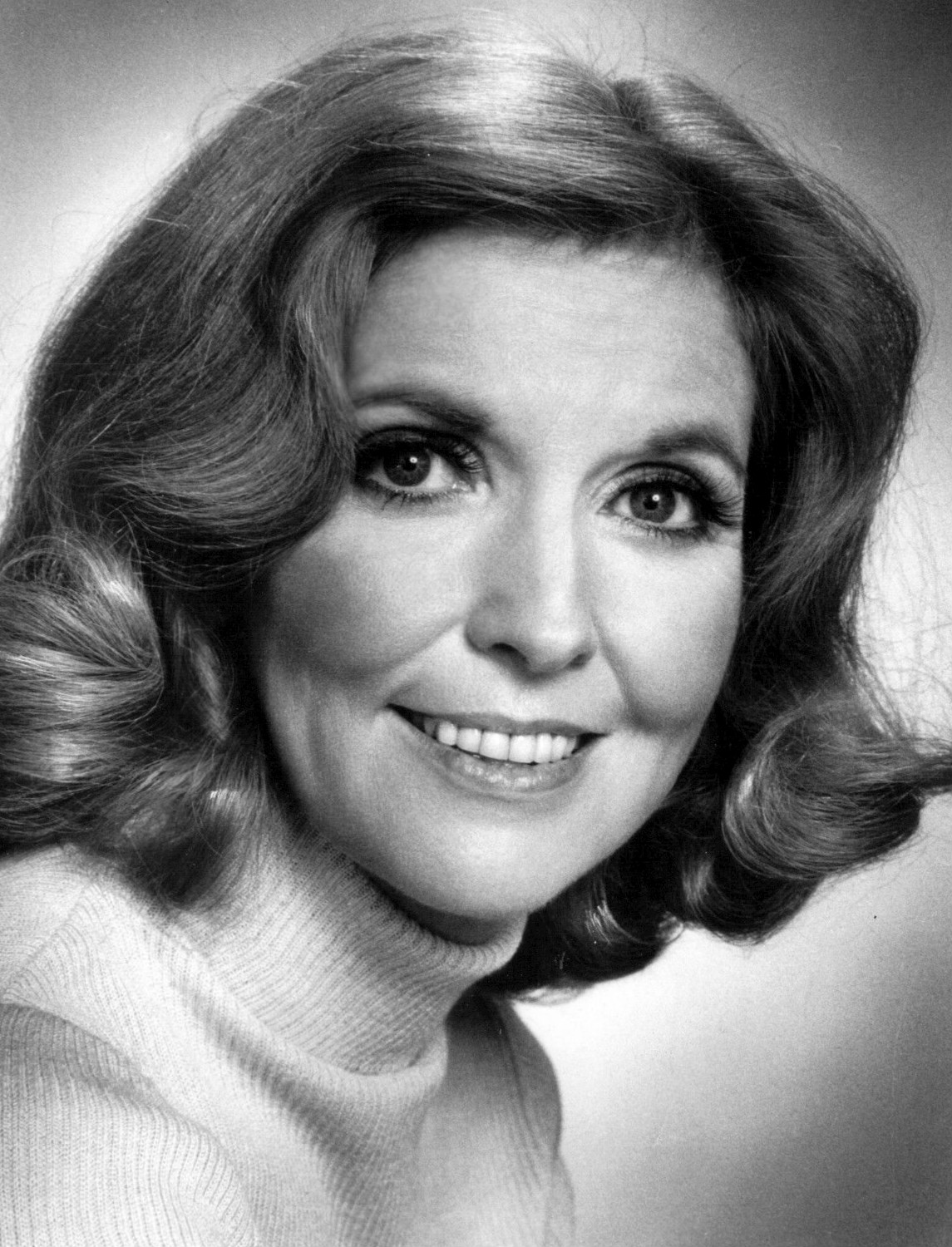
Anne Meara

- September 1 – Murray Fromson, American journalist (d. 2018)
- September 2 – Hal Ashby, American film director and editor (d. 1988)
- September 3 – Whitey Bulger, Irish-American gangster and multiple murderer (d. 2018)
- September 4 – Thomas Eagleton, American politician (d. 2007)
- September 5 – Bob Newhart, American comedian, actor (d. 2024)
- September 6 – Dow Finsterwald, American professional golfer (d. 2022)
- September 9 – Stanford Parris, American lawyer and politician (d. 2010)
- September 10 – Arnold Palmer, American professional golfer (d. 2016)
- September 11
  - Eve Brent, American actress (d. 2011)
  - David S. Broder, American journalist (d. 2011)
- September 12 – Harvey Schmidt, American composer (d. 2018)
- September 14
  - Larry Collins, American writer (d. 2005)
  - John Gutfreund, American banker, businessman and investor (d. 2016)
  - Mel Hancock, American politician (d. 2011)
- September 15 – Murray Gell-Mann, American physicist, Nobel laureate (d. 2019)
- September 16
  - Dale Kildee, American politician (d. 2021)
  - Maxine Kline, American female professional baseball player (d. 2022)
- September 19
  - Marge Roukema, American politician (d. 2014)
  - Mel Stewart, African-American actor (d. 2002)
- September 20 – Anne Meara, American actress, comedian (d. 2015)
- September 22
  - William E. Dannemeyer, American politician (d. 2019)
  - Cecil Williams, African-American pastor and civil rights activist (d. 2024)
- September 25
  - Barbara Walters, American television journalist (d. 2022)
  - Kevin White, American politician (d. 2012)
- September 26 – Meredith Gourdine, American athlete (d. 1998)
- September 28 – Skip Bafalis, American politician (d. 2023)
- September 30 – Helen M. Marshall, American politician (d. 2017)

=== October ===
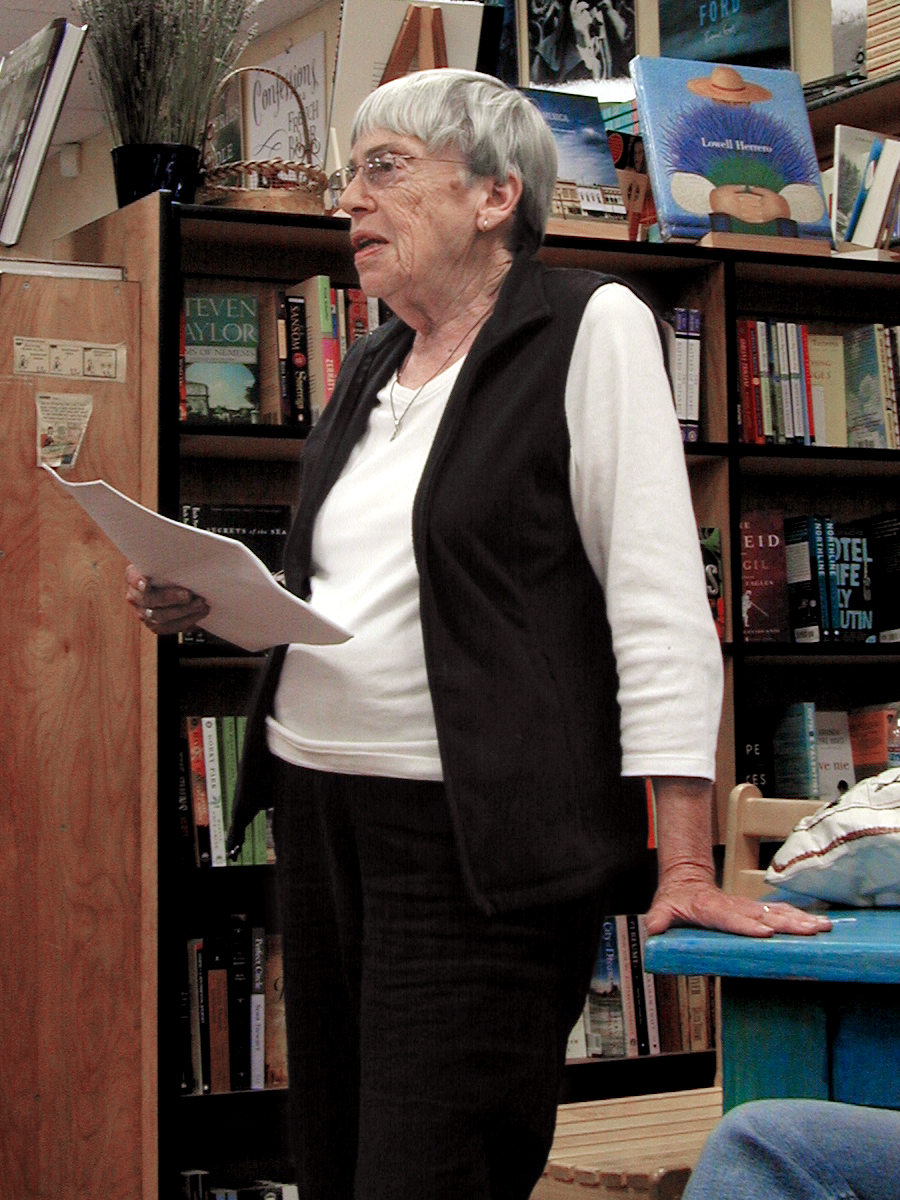
Ursula K. Le Guin

- October 2 – Moses Gunn, African-American actor (d. 1993)
- October 4
  - Scotty Beckett, American actor (d. 1968)
  - Leroy Van Dyke, American country music singer and guitarist
  - Judith Jarvis Thomson, American moral philosopher (d. 2020)
- October 5 – Richard F. Gordon Jr., American astronaut (d. 2017)
- October 8 – Arthur Bisguier, American chess grandmaster, chess promoter, and writer (d. 2017)
- October 15 – Hubert Dreyfus, American philosopher (d. 2017)
- October 18 – Jay Last, American physicist (d. 2021)
- October 21 – Ursula K. Le Guin, American science fiction and fantasy author (d. 2018)
- October 22 – Patsy Elsener, American diver (d. 2019)
- October 24
  - Jim Brosnan, American baseball player and sportscaster (d. 2014)
  - George Crumb, American composer and educator (d. 2022)
  - Gustav Ranis, American economist and academic (d. 2013)
  - Ronald E. Rosser, Medal of Honor recipient (d. 2020)
- October 25
  - LaDell Andersen, American college and basketball coach (d. 2019)
  - David McReynolds, American political activist (d. 2018)
- October 26 – Roland Hemond, American baseball executive (d. 2021)
- October 28 – Mitchell Torok, American country music singer (d. 2017)
- October 30 – Roy Kramer, American football coach and athletics administrator (d. 2025)
- October 31 – C. O. Brocato, American football player and scout (d. 2015)

=== November ===
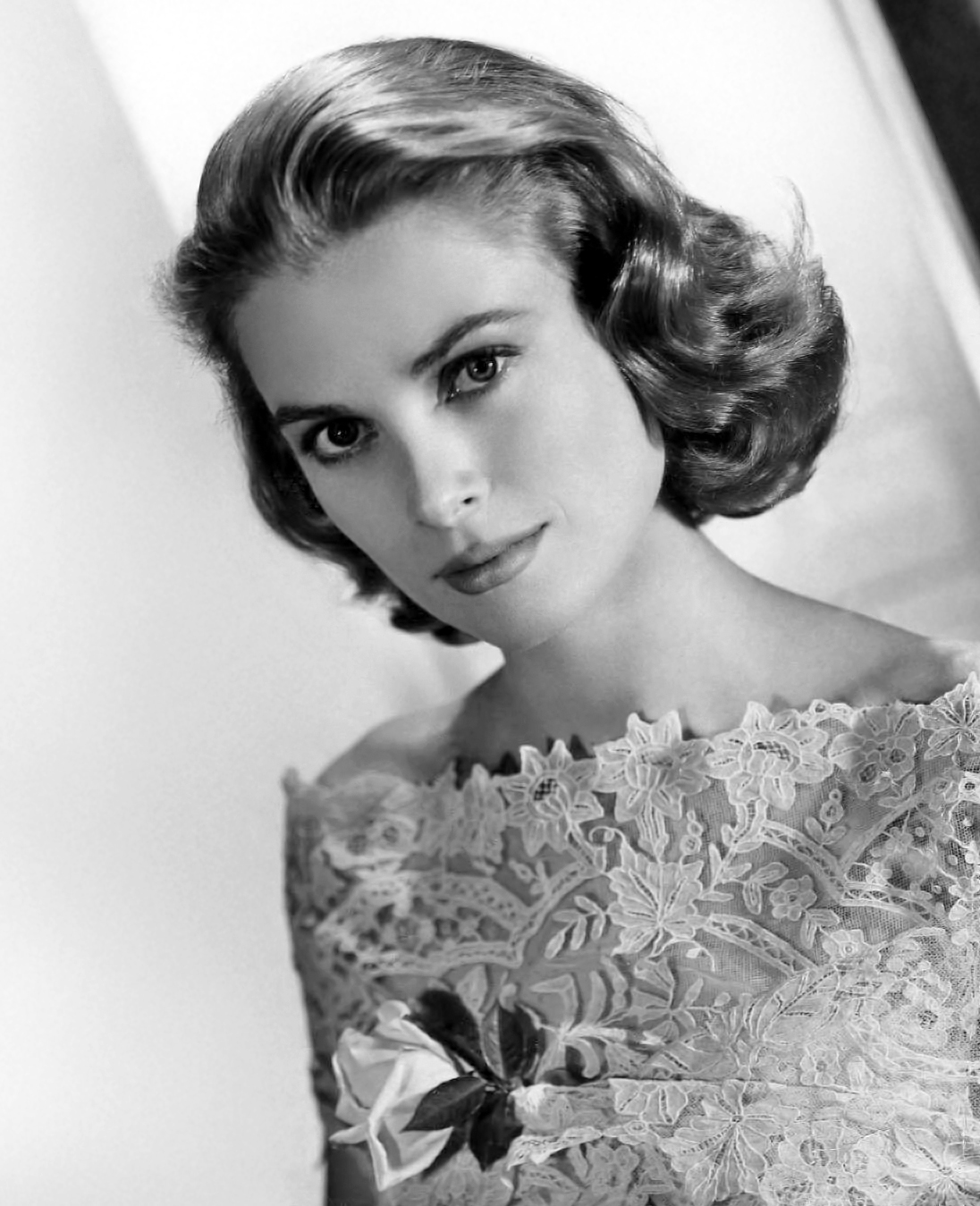
Grace Kelly

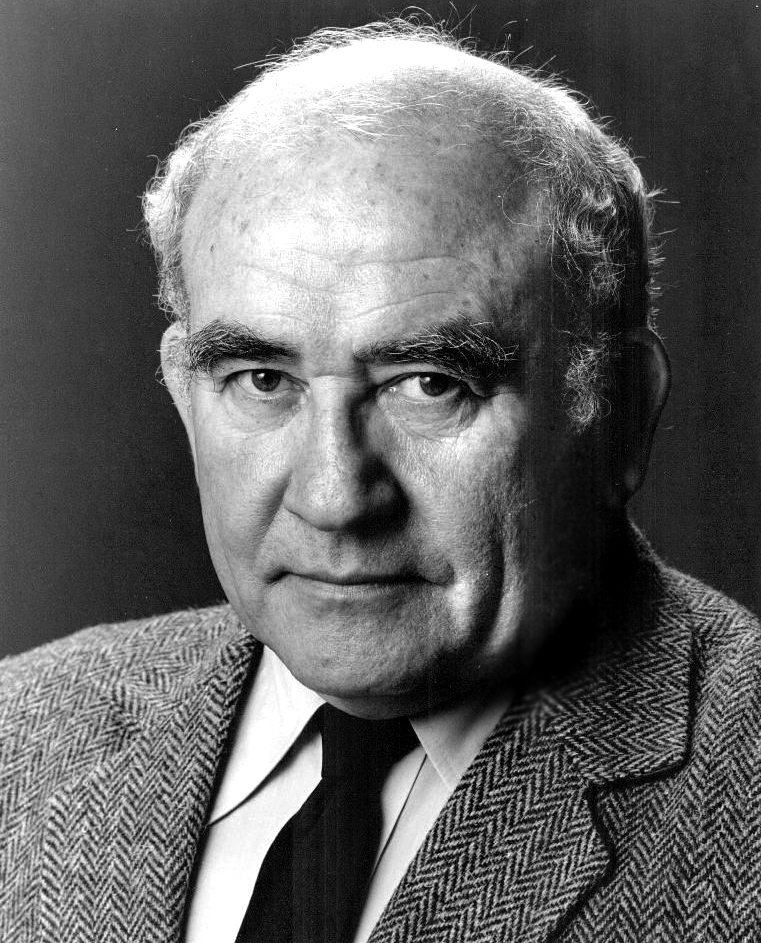
Ed Asner

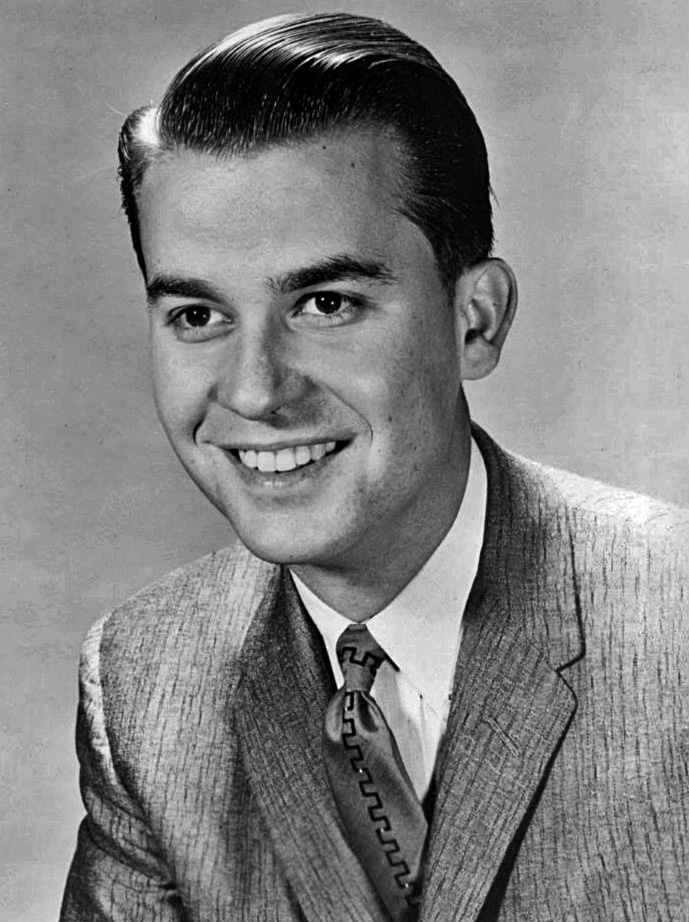
Dick Clark

- November 1 – Nicholas Mavroules, American politician (d. 2003)
- November 2
  - Rachel Ames, American actress
  - Harold Farberman, American conductor, composer and percussionist (d. 2018)
  - Lee Hedges, American football coach (d. 2023)
- November 4 – Jane Davis Doggett, American graphic designer (d. 2023)
- November 6 – June Squibb, American actress
- November 8
  - Bert Berns, American songwriter, record producer (d. 1967)
  - Bobby Bowden, American football player and coach (d. 2021)
- November 9 – Severn Darden, American comedian, actor (d. 1995)
- November 11 – LaVern Baker, American singer (d. 1997)
- November 12 – Grace Kelly, American actress (d. 1982)
- November 13 – Fred Phelps, American pastor, activist (Westboro Baptist Church) (d. 2014)
- November 14 – Jimmy Piersall, American baseball player and sportscaster (d. 2017)
- November 15
  - Ed Asner, American actor (d. 2021)
  - Joe Hinton, African-American soul music singer (d. 1968)
- November 17 – Jackie Ferrara, American sculptor d. 2025)
- November 23
  - John F. Keenan, American judge (d. 2024)
  - Hal Lindsey, American Christian evangelist (d. 2024)
  - Gloria Lynne, American jazz singer (d. 2013)
  - Shirley Palesh, baseball player (d. 2017)
- November 24
  - Marvin Kitman, author and television critic (d. 2023)
  - George Moscone, attorney, politician (d. 1978)
- November 26 – Betta St. John, actress, singer and dancer (d. 2023)
- November 28
  - Berry Gordy, African-American record producer, songwriter
  - Frederick D. Reese, African-American civil rights activist (d. 2018)
- November 30
  - Dick Clark, American television entertainer (d. 2012)
  - Joan Ganz Cooney, television producer

=== December ===
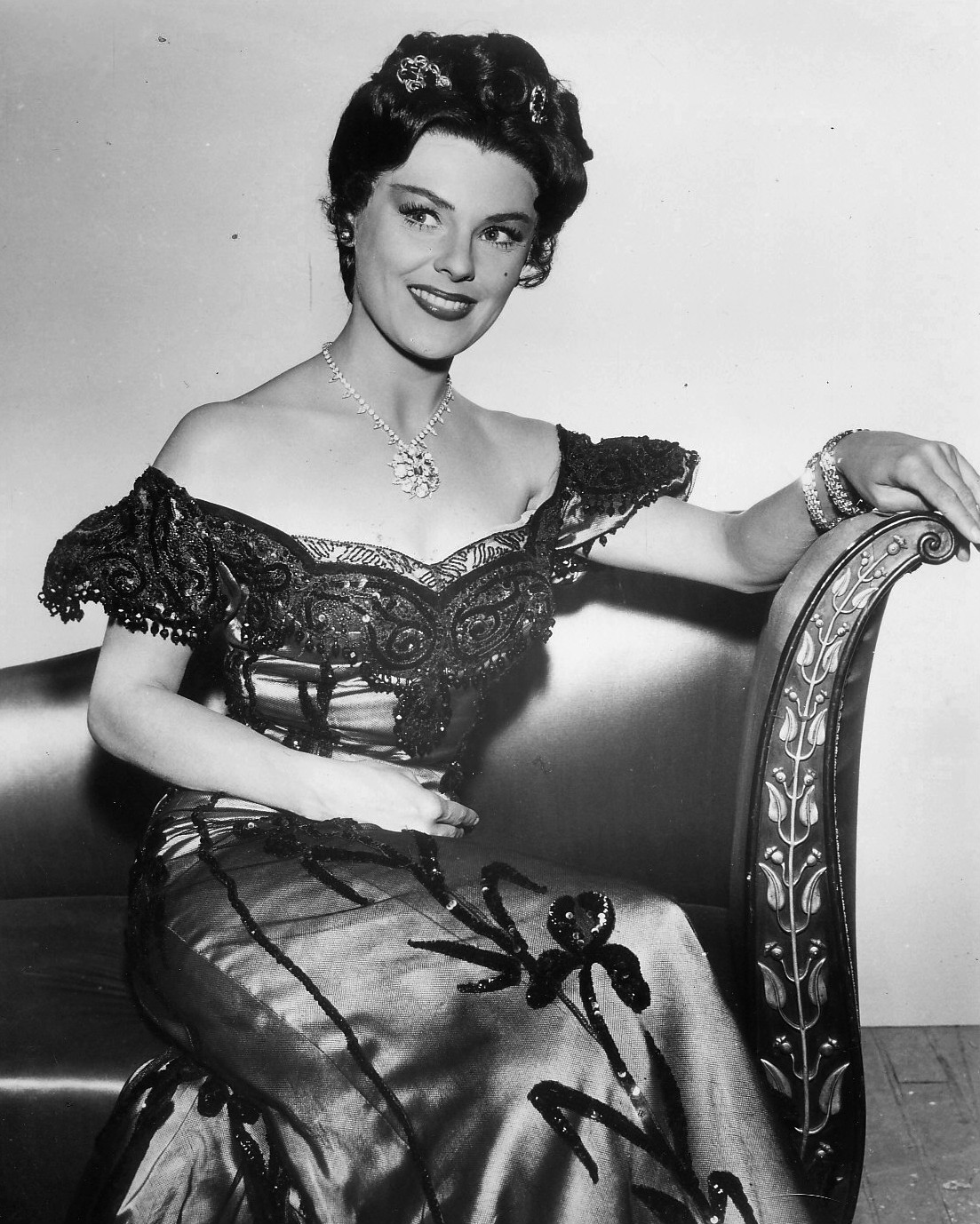
Kathleen Crowley

- December 1 – David Doyle, American actor (d. 1997)
- December 2
  - Dan Jenkins, American journalist and author (d. 2019)
  - Leon Litwack, American historian and author (d. 2021)
- December 9 – John Cassavetes, American actor (d. 1989)
- December 17 – William Safire, American author, columnist, journalist, and presidential speechwriter (d. 2009)
- December 20 – David H. Gambrell, politician (d. 2021)
- December 21 – Newton Morton, geneticist (d. 2018)
- December 23 – Chet Baker, jazz musician (d. 1988)
- December 26 – Kathleen Crowley, actress (d. 2017)
- December 29
  - Theodore V. Buttrey Jr., American educator, classicist and numismatist (d. 2018)
  - Susie Garrett, African-American actress (d. 2002)
  - Matt "Guitar" Murphy, American blues musician (d. 2018)
- December 31 – Robert B. Silvers, American literary editor (d. 2017)

=== Undated ===
- David Fintz Altabé, scholar and poet (d. 2008)

== Deaths ==
- January 5 – Marc McDermott, actor (born 1871)
- January 13
  - Wyatt Earp, gunfighter (born 1848)
  - Emil Fuchs, sculptor and painter (born 1866 in Austria)
- January 15
  - Leonard Cline, novelist, poet and journalist (born 1893; heart failure)
  - George Cope, painter (born 1855)
- January 21 – Maria Taylor Beale, author (born 1849)
- January 30 – Franklin J. Drake, admiral (born 1846)
- February 4 – William Rankin Ballard, businessman (born 1847)
- February 11 – Frank Putnam Flint, U.S. Senator from California from 1905 to 1911 (born 1862)
- February 14 – Thomas Burke, sprinter (born 1875)
- February 18 – William Russell, silent film actor (born 1884)
- February 22 – Louise Upton Brumback, landscape painter (born 1867)
- February 24
  - Adaline Hohf Beery, songbook compiler (born 1859)
  - Frank Keenan, actor (born 1858)
- February 27 – Briton Hadden, co-founder of Time magazine (born 1898)
- March 1 – Royal Hurlburt Weller, politician (born 1881)
- March 5 – David Dunbar Buick, inventor (born 1854 in Scotland)
- March 6 – Moses E. Clapp, politician (born 1851)
- March 12 – Asa Griggs Candler, businessman and politician (born 1851)
- March 15 – Pinetop Smith, blues pianist (born 1904; shot in dancehall brawl)
- March 18 – William P. Cronan, Naval Governor of Guam (born 1879)
- March 28 – Katharine Lee Bates, librettist, author of "America the Beautiful" (born 1859)
- April 4 – William Michael Crose, United States Navy Commander and 7th Governor of American Samoa (born 1867)
- April 28 – May Jordan McConnel, Australian trade unionist and suffragist (born 1860)
- June 2 – Don Murray, jazz clarinettist (born 1894; auto accident)
- June 4 – Harry Frazee, Broadway producer and baseball owner (born 1881)
- June 5 – Adolph Coors, brewer (born 1847 in Prussia; suicide)
- June 9 – murder–suicide
  - Louis Bennison, silent Western film actor (born 1884)
  - Margaret Lawrence, actress (born 1889)
- June 11 – William D. Boyce, entrepreneur and founder of the Boy Scouts of America (born 1858)
- July 2 – Gladys Brockwell, film actress (born 1894; auto accident)
- July 3 – Dustin Farnum, silent Western film actor (born 1874)
- July 9 – Cack Henley, baseball player (born 1884)
- July 12 – Robert Henri, painter (born 1865)
- July 20 – Noble Drew Ali, prophet (born 1886)
- August 3
  - Emile Berliner, inventor (born 1851 in Hanover)
  - Thorstein Veblen, economist (born 1857)
- August 19 – Chris Kelly, jazz trumpeter (born c.1890)
- August 27 – James Knox Taylor, official architect (born 1857)
- September 2 – Paul Leni, filmmaker (born 1885 in Germany)
- September 4 – Frederick Freeman Proctor, vaudeville impresario (born 1851)
- September 25 – Miller Huggins, baseball manager (born 1879)
- October 3 – Jeanne Eagels, actress (born 1890; addiction)
- October 15 – Annie Lowrie Alexander, physician and educator (born 1864)
- November 14 – Joe McGinnity, baseball player (born 1871)
- November 17 – Herman Hollerith, businessman and inventor (born 1860)
- November 24 – Raymond Hitchcock, actor and producer (born 1865)
- December 10 – Harry Crosby, publisher and poet (born 1898; suicide)
- December 19 – Blind Lemon Jefferson, blues musician (born 1893; heart failure)
- December 21 – I. L. Patterson, politician, 18th Governor of Oregon (born 1859)
- Undated
  - Timothy Francis Donovan Aaron, New Jersey politician (born 1853)
  - Adelaïde Alsop Robineau, ceramicist (born 1865)
  - Dallas Lore Sharp, nature writer (born 1870)

== See also ==
- 1929 in American television
- List of American films of 1929
- Timeline of United States history (1900–1929)
