= Tony Douglas =

Tony Douglas may refer to:

- Tony Douglas (footballer) (born 1952), football forward from Trinidad & Tobago
- Tony Douglas (singer) (1929–2013), American country music singer
- Tony Douglas (businessman) (born 1963), British businessman
- Tony Douglas, co-owner of Essential Media Communications, an Australian PR and polling company

== See also ==
- Anthony Douglas (born 1985), British short track speed skater
