= Emily Anne Staples =

American politician (1929–2018)

Emily Anne Staples Tuttle (née Mayer; May 3, 1929 – January 13, 2018) was an American politician.

Born in Minneapolis, Minnesota, she earned her bachelor's degree from the University of Minnesota in 1950 and her master's degree in public administration from the John F. Kennedy School of Government in 1981. Originally a member of the Republican Party, in 1973, she switched to the Democratic Party. From 1977 to 1981, she served in the Minnesota Senate. In 1990, she unsuccessfully ran for the DFL nomination for Lieutenant Governor, with Mike Hatch in 1990. She served on the Hennepin County Board of Commissioners from 1993 to 1995. In 1954, she married Loring M. Staples Jr. who died in 1988; in 1995, Staples married Gedney Tuttle. Emily Anne Staples Tuttle, aged 88, died on January 13, 2018, at United Hospital, in Saint Paul, Minnesota.
