= Maria Taylor Beale =

Maria Parker Taylor Beale (January 30, 1849 – January 21, 1929) was an American author. She published Jack O'Doon: A Novel, a novel about the North Carolina coast, in 1895, and The White Horse In The Tree Top, as well as a number of short stories.

She was born Maria Taylor in Richmond, Virginia, in 1894, and studied art in Paris. She married Charles Willing Beale, who was also an author, on January 25, 1872, and lived in Arden, North Carolina (which they helped found and which her husband named after the woods in William Shakespeare's As You Like It).

She died in Arden on January 21, 1929, and is buried with her husband at Calvary Episcopal Church Cemetery in Fletcher, North Carolina.
