= Timothy Francis Donovan Aaron =

American politician from New Jersey (1853–1929)

Timothy Francis Donovan Aaron (1853–1929) was a New Jersey politician.

== Early life ==
Aaron was born in London, England, in 1853 to Margaret (Crowley) and Timothy, or Corneilus Donovan. At age 18 months, Timothy migrated to New York City with Margaret. Timothy's father was a partner in a saloon in New York City with Young Barney Aaron, a champion bare knuckles boxer, and future boxing referee. Young Barney is a member of the International Boxing Hall of Fame. Timothy's father died when Tim was a young boy, and Margaret subsequently married Young Barney Aaron. Timothy eventually took Aaron as his last name out of respect for his stepfather.

For three years as a young man, it is reported that Donovan Aaron worked in different law offices, but eventually realized that he had a talent for lettering. In 1890, Donovan Aaron, his wife Barbara (Volz), and children Annie, Florence (Frank), Mary and Grace moved to Jersey City. He worked as a letterer for 16 years with the Central Railroad of New Jersey, and eventually went into the sign lettering business himself. He also ran a boarding house on Long Street in Jersey City for many years.

== Public service ==
Donovan Aaron was elected three times as a justice of the peace, with each term being five years.

In 1915, he was elected to the New Jersey General Assembly as a Democrat from Jersey City, by 18,156 votes over George W. Ritter, the highest Republican vote getter. In the General Assembly, Donovan Aaron served on the committees on Public Health, Sanatorium for Tuberculous Diseases, and the State Prison. He was re-elected to the General Assembly in 1916. He eventually retired from the General Assembly, and returned to running both his sign lettering business and boarding house.

== Death ==
Donovan Aaron died in Jersey City on May 19, 1929, and is buried at Bayview – New York Bay Cemetery in Jersey City with his wife Barbara (died in 1935), and daughters Annie Seeberger (died in October 1955) and Mary Berkowitz (died in May 1967).
