= J. C. Duncan =

American politician (1929–2026)

Member of the South Carolina House of Representatives from the 36th/Spartanburg County district
- In office 1969–1972
- In office 1975–1980

Personal details
- Born: June 27, 1929 Lyman, South Carolina, U.S.
- Died: October 2, 2026 (aged 97)
- Party: Democratic
- Education: Wofford College
- Occupation: Farmer, realtor, preacher, politician, teacher

Jason Charlie Duncan (June 27, 1929 – October 2, 2026) was an American politician in the state of South Carolina. He served in the South Carolina House of Representatives as a member of the Democratic Party from 1969 to 1972 and 1975 to 1980, representing Spartanburg County, South Carolina. Duncan was a farmer, Methodist preacher, teacher, college professor and realtor. He died on October 2, 2026, at the age of 97.
