= 1929 in American television =

This is a list of American television-related events in 1929.

== Events ==
- March - In March 1929, the radio giant RCA began daily experimental television broadcasts in New York City over the station W2XBS, the predecessor of the current television station WNBC. The 60-line transmissions consisted of pictures, signs, and views of persons and objects. The experimental broadcasts continued until 1931.
- Summer - In 1928, Charles Francis Jenkins had established the experimental television station W3XK in Wheaton, Maryland. For at least the first eighteen months, 48-line silhouette images from motion picture film were broadcast. In the summer of 1929, Jenkins started broadcasting in halftones.
- December- In December, the inventor Vladimir K. Zworykin developed a prototype version of his "kinescope" (his term for a cathode-ray tube). Zworykin met with the businessman David Sarnoff, who considered hiring him as the new head of RCA's television development laboratories. The transition of Zworykin to his new position had been completed by the spring of 1930.
- Specific date unknown - In 1927, the inventor Philo Farnsworth had transmitted the first image of his image dissector camera tube at his laboratory at 202 Green Street in San Francisco. In 1928, Farnsworth had held the first press demonstration of electronic television . In 1929, Farnsworth's system was further improved by the elimination of a motor generator. Consequently, his television system had no mechanical parts. During the same year, Farnsworth transmitted the first live human images with his system, including a 3.5 in (89 mm) image of his wife Elma ("Pem") with her eyes closed (possibly due to the bright lighting required).
