= David Fintz Altabé =

American poet

- Born: 1929; New York City
- Died: 2008 (aged 78–79); Tampa, Florida
- Education: Columbia University
- Occupations: Scholar; poet; professor
- Children: 2

David Fintz Altabé (1929–2008), was an internationally known scholar and poet specializing in Judeo-Spanish literature and Sephardic culture. He served twice as President of the American Society of Sephardic Studies as well as Vice-President of the American Association of Jewish Friends of Turkey. He also was on the Sephardic Council of Overseers and taught Spanish at the Queensborough Community College of the City University of New York where he was honored as professor emeritus.

He was born in New York City to Sephardic parents of Turkish origin and died in November 2008.

== Works authored ==
- Temas y Dialogos (1970).
- "The significance of 1492 to the Jews and Muslims of Spain.” Hispania (September 1992).
- Spanish and Portuguese Jewry Before and After 1492 (1993).
- Una Kozecha de Rimas i Konsejas: A Harvest of Rhymes and Folk-Tales. (2000).
- Merekiyas de Orchard Street. (1996).

As an editor:

- Altabé, David Fintz, Erhan Atay, and Israel J. Katz, eds. Studies on Turkish Jewish History: political and social relations, literature, and linguistics: the quincentennial papers. Brooklyn, New York: Sepher-Hermon Press, 1996.

== Works translated ==
- Sadacca, Haim Vitali. Un Ramo de Poemas: A Bouquet of Poems. Translated by David Fintz Altabé. New York: Foundation for the Advancement of Sephardic Studies and Culture, 2009.
- Bécquer, Gustavo Adolfo. Symphony of Love: Las Rimas. Translated by David Fintz Altabé and Joan Altabé. Long Beach, New York: Regina, 1974.
