= Tony Douglas (singer) =

American singer (1929–2013)

Tony Douglas (April 12, 1929 – January 22, 2013) was an American country music singer based in Athens, Texas, United States.

His song "Shrimpin'" (1961) led to the formation of Tony Douglas and the Shrimpers. Douglas reached the top 30 on the Billboard country chart with "His And Hers", and then "Thank You For Touching My Life" (1973), "My Last Day", and "If I Can Make It (Through The Mornin')" (1975).

Douglas had suffered from lymphoma. He died in 2013 at the age of 83.
