= Louis W. Cappelli =

American politician

Lieutenant Governor of Rhode Island
- In office 1941–1944
- Governor: J. Howard McGrath
- Preceded by: James O. McManus
- Succeeded by: Vacant (1944–1945); John Pastore (1945)

Secretary of State of Rhode Island
- In office 1933–1939
- Governor: Theodore F. Green; Robert E. Quinn
- Preceded by: Ernest L. Sprague
- Succeeded by: J. Hector Paquin

Personal details
- Born: April 14, 1894 Providence, Rhode Island
- Died: July 29, 1966 (aged 72) Providence, Rhode Island
- Party: Democratic

Louis W. Cappelli (April 14, 1894 – July 29, 1966) was an American politician. Between 1941 and 1944 he was lieutenant governor of the state of Rhode Island.

== Career ==
Louis Cappelli attended Brown University. After completing a law degree at Yale University, he was admitted to the bar. During the First World War he served as a soldier in the US Army in Europe between 1917 and 1919. Politically, he became a member of the Democratic Party. In 1930 he ran unsuccessfully for the office of Secretary of State of Rhode Island. Two years later he was elected to this office, which he held until 1939, being elected again in 1934 and in 1936. He lost a re-election bid in 1938 to J. Hector Paquin during a Republican sweep of state offices. In 1940 he was a substitute delegate to the Democratic National Convention, where Franklin D. Roosevelt was nominated for the third time for president.

In 1940, Cappelli was elected Lieutenant Governor of Rhode Island alongside J. Howard McGrath. He held this office between 1941 and 1944. He was Deputy Governor and Chairman of the State Senate. On April 12, 1944, he was appointed an associate justice of the Rhode Island Superior Court. He remained on the court until his death in 1966. From 1959 he was presiding justice of this court. Louis Cappelli died on July 29, 1966, in his hometown of Providence.

Political offices
| Preceded by Ernest L. Sprague | Secretary of State of Rhode Island; 1933–1939 | Succeeded by J. Hector Paquin |
| Preceded by James O. McManus | Lieutenant Governor of Rhode Island; 1941–1944 | Succeeded by John Pastore |
