= Kenneth Goff =

American Christian Identity minister (1914–1972)

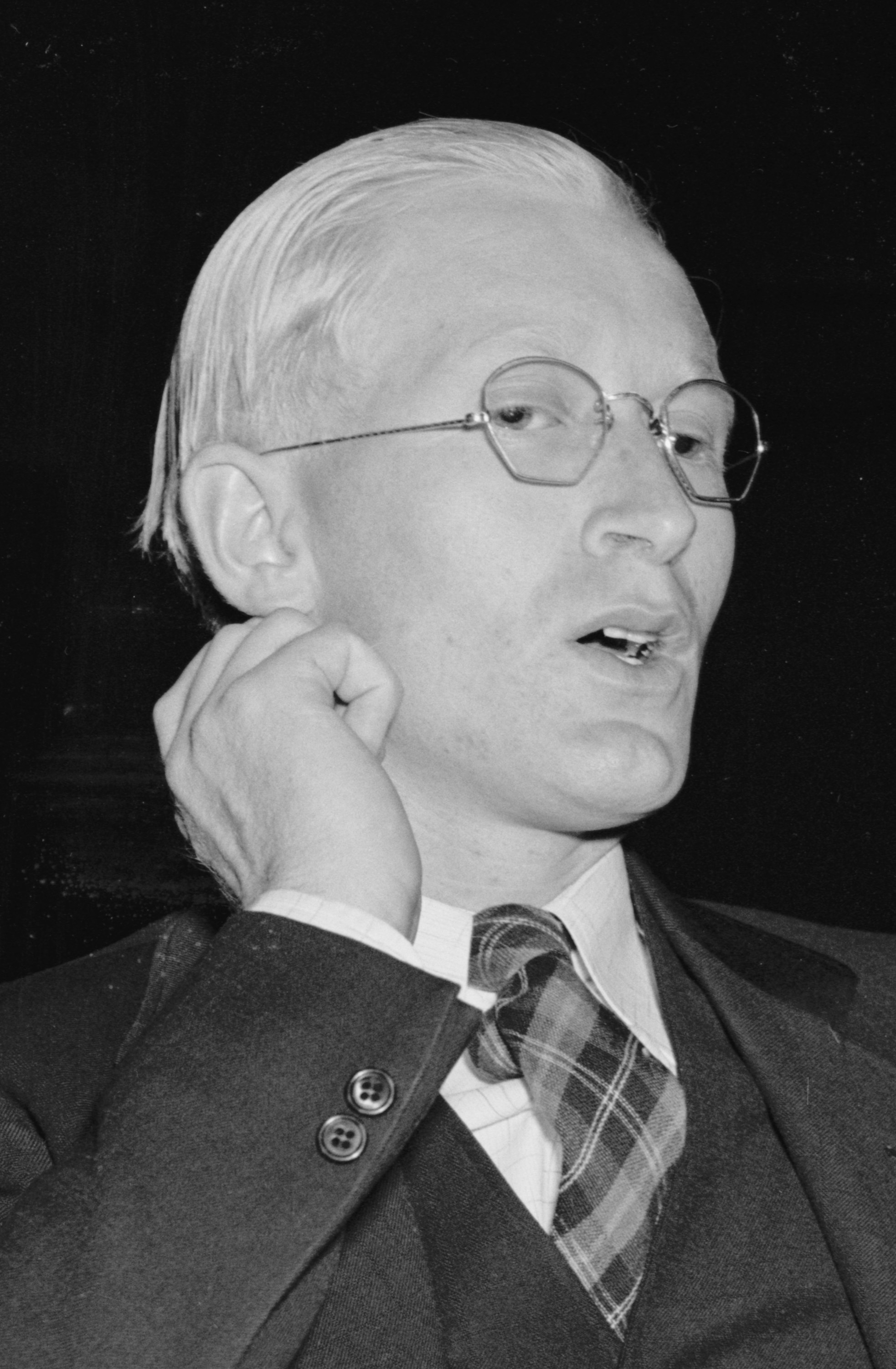
- Goff in 1939
- Born: Oliver Kenneth Goff; September 19, 1914; Delavan, Wisconsin, U.S.
- Died: April 11, 1972 (aged 57); Chicago, Illinois, U.S.
- Occupation: Minister
- Known for: 1944 national chairman of Gerald L. K. Smith's Christian Youth for America

Oliver Kenneth Goff (September 19, 1914 – April 11, 1972) was a Christian Identity minister and anti-communist. He had been a member of the Communist Party of the United States of America (CPUSA) from 1936 to 1939 after which he testified before the Dies Committee. He was the 1944 national chairman of Gerald L. K. Smith's Christian Youth for America.

Goff was the author of several books, tracts, and periodicals. Through the Soldiers of the Cross Training Institute, he trained several ministers in Christian Identity, including Dan Gayman and Thom Robb. He died at the age of 57 in Chicago in 1972 during a speaking tour.

== Biography ==
According to his own biographical material, he was a member of the Communist Party of the United States of America (CPUSA) from May 2, 1936, to October 9, 1939, when he testified before the Dies Committee. He told the Dies Committee that the Communists were in favor of water fluoridation, because they intended to take over water treatment plants and threaten to poison the water supply with fluoride if Americans did not surrender. He claimed that while in the CPUSA he infiltrated youth organizations and worked for Communist front organizations, maintaining links with Communist leaders both in the U.S. and the U.S.S.R., in order to lay the groundwork for Communist revolution in the United States. He also claimed that his testimony before the Dies Committee led to the dismissal of 169 federal employees.

During the 1940s and 1950s, Goff was a key Christian Identity figure in the orbit of Gerald L. K. Smith, along with Identity leaders Wesley A. Swift and William Potter Gale. He was the national chairman of Smith's Christian Youth for America.

Following his appearance before the Dies Committee, Goff made numerous speaking tours and was the author of 28 books, numerous tracts and several periodicals, including from 1962 to 1967 The Pilgrim Torch. In his 1954 book, Hitler and the Twentieth Century Hoax, which denied the Holocaust, Goff claimed that Hitler was a Communist agent, hinted he was Jewish, and also that Hitler was still alive and would reappear to advance Communism. He also claimed that both hippies and desegregation were part of a Communist plot.

Goff's main influence on Christian Identity came through his leadership of the Soldiers of the Cross Training Institute, located in Evergreen, Colorado, which trained Christian Identity ministers, including Dan Gayman of the Church of Israel and Thom Robb, pastor of the Christian Revival Center and National Director of The Knights Party (KKK). The Institute provided courses on Christianity, politics, survivalism, and other subjects.

He appeared on the Joe Pyne show in 1966.

In his 1970 book, The Hoaxers: Plain Liars, Fancy Liars and Damned Liars, Morris Kominsky claimed that Goff was the author of Brain-Washing, a book that purported to be a condensation of a work by Lavrentiy Beria, the Soviet secret police chief.

Goff has also been attributed with creating the "strangled to death quote", which he falsely attributed to the CPUSA leader, Gus Hall. The purported quote was:

I dream of the hour when the last congressman is strangled to death on the guts of the last preacher-and since the Christians seem to love to sing about the blood, why not give them a little of it? Slit the throats of their children [and] draw them over the mourners' bench and the pulpit and allow them to drown in their own blood, and then see whether they enjoy singing those hymns.

The quote is evocative of Denis Diderot, the eighteenth-century philosopher who allegedly wrote, "I should like to see ... the last king strangled with the guts of the last priest."

In 2011, the Royal Canadian Mounted Police released a 1960 letter from Goff to the anti-Communist writer Pat Walsh, which claimed that Canadian socialist leader Tommy Douglas had been active in Communist circles in the 1930s. According to Goff, "Premier Douglas was a preacher in Chicago about the time I was a member of the Communist Party and he attended party rallies on the University campus presided over by Claude Lightfoot and Morris Childs".

== Books ==
- Brainwashed Into Slavery, by Kenneth Goff, 63 pages
- They would destroy our way of life (1944) 48 pages
- Traitors in the Pulpit and Treason Toward God (1946) 61 pages
- Confessions of Stalin's Agent (1948) 78 pages text
- Red betrayal of youth (1948) 32 pages ASIN B0007FU4W2
- The Soviet Art Of Brainwashing - A Synthesis of the Russian Textbook on Psychopolitics (1950) ASIN B000I16KSW
- Will Russia Invade America? (1951) 63 pages
- Communism in America (1952)
- The scarlet woman of Revelation (1952) 32 pages ASIN B0007FW6C8
- One World a Red World (1952) 64 pages ASIN B0BFL2Y43R
- The Long Arm of Stalin (1952) 63 pages
- Hitler and the Twentieth Century Hoax (1954) 72 pages. ASIN B0007FZHY2 Goff suggests Hitler was a communist agent and may have survived the fall of Berlin.
- Strange Fire (The Church, Christianity & Communism in America) (1954) hardcover ASIN B0007F98D8
- The flying saucers: From Russia, from another planet, from God (1955) 32 pages ISBN 978-2925369288
- AMERICA: Zion of God (1955) 80 pages ASIN B005ZUOGE6
- Reds Promote Racial War (1958) 76 pages ASIN B0007EVPJE
- Red Shadows (1959) 93 pages ASIN B0045V9THK
- Crackpot or crack shot (1964)
- Red tide (1962) 63 pages
- Crackpot or crack shot (1964) 10 pages
- Satanism - the father of Communism (1968) 72 pages ASIN B0007EW07U
- Red atrocities against Christians (1968) 63 pages
- Reds launch war to destroy white race (1969)
- From Babylon to Baruch ISBN 978-1588401496
- Pilgrim Torch (c.1946-1967)
- Christian Battle Cry (1966–1971)

== See also ==
- Dr. Strangelove
