= William Vanderbilt =

William Vanderbilt may refer to:

- William Henry Vanderbilt (1821–1885), American railroad magnate
- William Henry Vanderbilt II (1870–92), grandson of William Henry Vanderbilt
- William Henry Vanderbilt III (1901–1981), 59th Governor of Rhode Island, great-grandson of William Henry Vanderbilt
- William Kissam Vanderbilt (1849–1920), son of William Henry Vanderbilt
- William Kissam Vanderbilt II (1878–1944), son of William Kissam Vanderbilt
