= Brain-Washing (book) =

1955 black propaganda book by L. Ron Hubbard

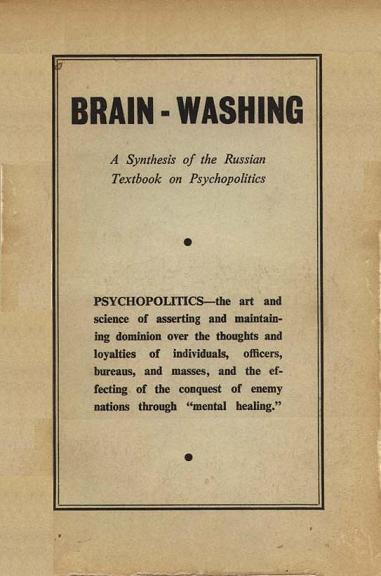
- Cover of Brain-Washing, as published by the Church of Scientology in 1955
- Publisher: Church of Scientology
- Publication date: 1955

Brain-Washing: A Synthesis of the Russian Textbook on Psychopolitics is a Red Scare, black propaganda book, first published by the Church of Scientology in 1955 about brainwashing. The text falsely claims to be a synthesis of existing, actual brainwashing manuals circulating in the Soviet Union. Several different versions were distributed with somewhat different contents. Its actual author is unclear; it is widely believed to have been authored by Church of Scientology founder L. Ron Hubbard, though radical rightist activist Kenneth Goff claimed to be its compiler and some believe he was the author.

In this text, many of the practices Scientology opposes (psychiatry teaching, brain surgery, electroshock, income tax) are described as communist-led conspiracies and its technical content is limited to suggesting more of these practices on behalf of the Soviet Union. The text also describes the Church of Scientology as the greatest threat to communism.

There are some differences in the various versions of the text in circulation. The Church of Scientology withdrew it from publication several months later; it continued to be distributed, largely by far-right groups, based on the version distributed by Goff.

== Background and publication ==
The text claims to be a synthesis of various existing manuals of the utilization of psychiatry as a means of social control, which it claimed actually circulated in the Soviet Union through Lavrentiy Beria, the chief of the USSR secret police. This is not true and this source book does not exist. The text is a relative copy of the 1953, best-selling, non-fiction book Brain-washing in Red China by journalist Edward Hunter.

In late 1955, the Hubbard Association of Scientologists International published the booklet in an emergency basis; their edition was 64 pages, entitled Brain-Washing: A Synthesis of the Russian Textbook on Psychopolitics. Hubbard tried to present the Federal Bureau of Investigation with a copy, but the Bureau expressed skepticism about the document's authenticity, writing that:

the authenticity of this booklet seems to be of a doubtful nature since it lacks documentation of source material and communist words and phrases. Also, there are no quotations from well-known communist works as normally would be used in a synthesis of communist writings. In addition, the author himself admits that he cannot vouch for the authenticity of this booklet.

Hubbard sent the material to the FBI, and one unidentified FBI agent gave this review: "[He] appears mental." When the FBI ignored him, Hubbard wrote again stating that Soviet agents had, on three occasions, attempted to hire him to work against the United States, and were upset about his refusal, and that one agent specifically attacked him using electroshock as a weapon. Hunter called the book a hoax, while the evaluator at the Operations Coordinating Board of President Dwight D. Eisenhower's National Security Council thought that "if the booklet is a fake, the author or authors know so much about brainwashing techniques that I would consider them experts, superior to any that I have met to date."

Hubbard withdrew all circulation of the manual in January 1956 and asked for all copies to be returned to the Church of Scientology.

The radical rightist Christian Identity minister Kenneth Goff began distributing the manual at some point, though it is unclear when; he claimed that he had started distributing it privately in 1955, before Hubbard's publication. It is unclear what connection he had to Hubbard; they used the same publisher, E.E. Manney. While Hubbard had distributed a copy to the FBI, Goff went even further: he distributed copies to congressmen and politicians, alleging that the Alaska Mental Health Enabling Act was a Communist conspiracy, nicknaming the legislation the "Siberia Bill." This drew attention to the manual. Goff alleged that the purpose of the Alaska bill was to create "a prison camp under the guise of mental health for everyone who raises their voice against Communism and the hidden government operating in our nation."

Selections of the book were read into the Congressional Record, under the title of "Murder of Human Minds," in which Goff decried the book, but also stated that its methods allowed "unlimited sexual opportunities... over the bodies and minds of helpless patients," and that anyone could purchase a copy for $1 directly from Goff himself. This version became far more popular than Hubbard's and the Church of Scientology even went on to distribute Goff's version.

== Authorship ==
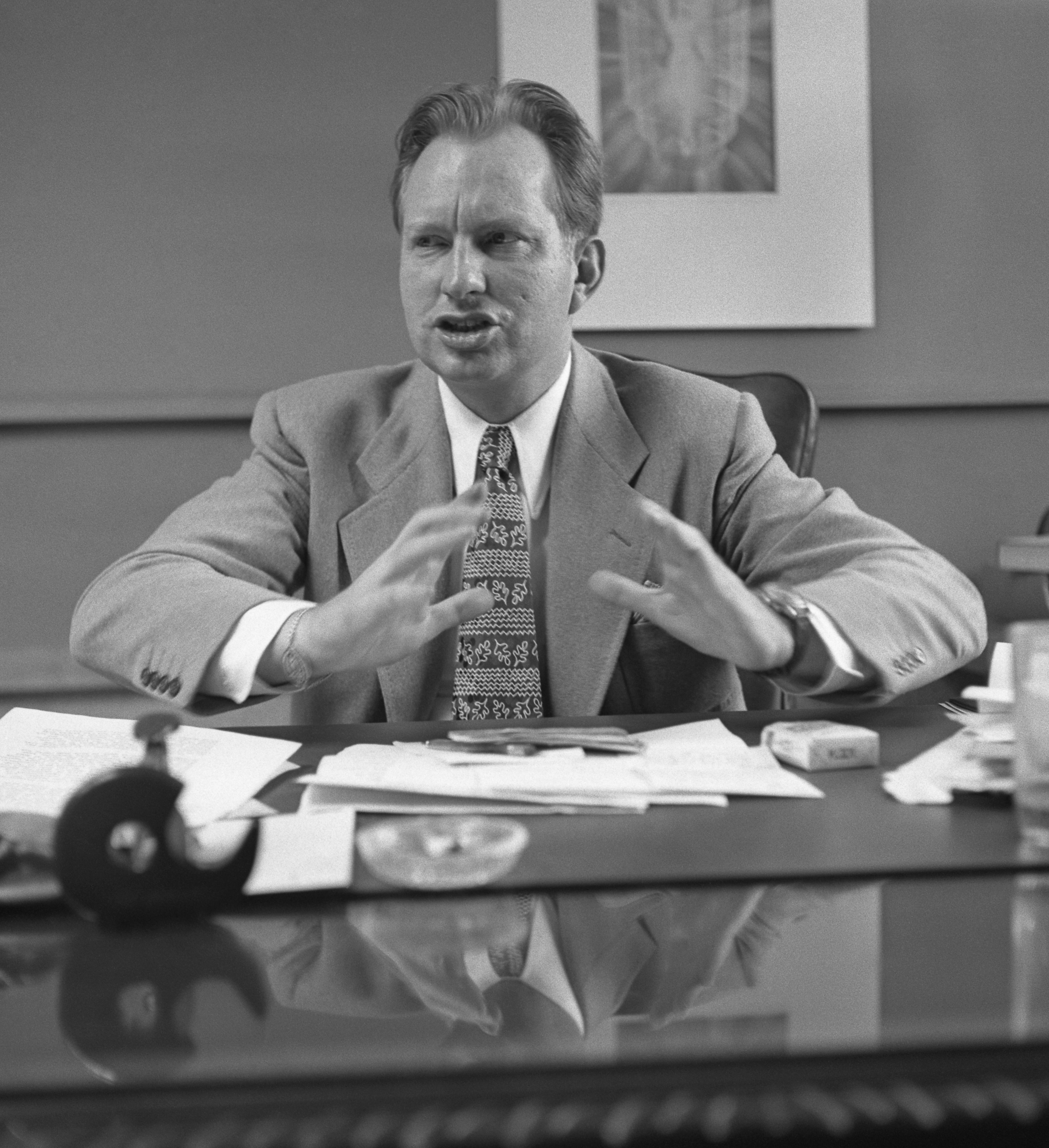
L. Ron Hubbard in 1950

=== L. Ron Hubbard and Scientology ===
Hubbard claimed that he had not written the book, but merely compiled it from these alleged sources. He falsely claimed an entirely unrelated book was actually the original. The manual contains numerous terms typical of Hubbard's style and past writings.

L. Ron Hubbard Jr., estranged son of Scientology founder L. Ron Hubbard, stated: "Dad wrote every word of it. Barbara, Bryan, and my wife typed the manuscript off his dictation." Hubbard's former editor, John Sanborn, agreed with Hubbard Jr.'s testimony.

In 1963, the Australian Board of Inquiry regarded the book as written by Hubbard, something that neither Hubbard nor the Church of Scientology's HASI Hubbard Association of Scientologists International refuted at the time.

According to Massimo Introvigne, critics of Scientology attribute the Brainwashing manual to Hubbard because of the claim that it was later used to practice actual brainwashing in the church. Hubbard, who was strongly opposed to psychiatry, denounced brainwashing in some of his writing.

=== Kenneth Goff ===
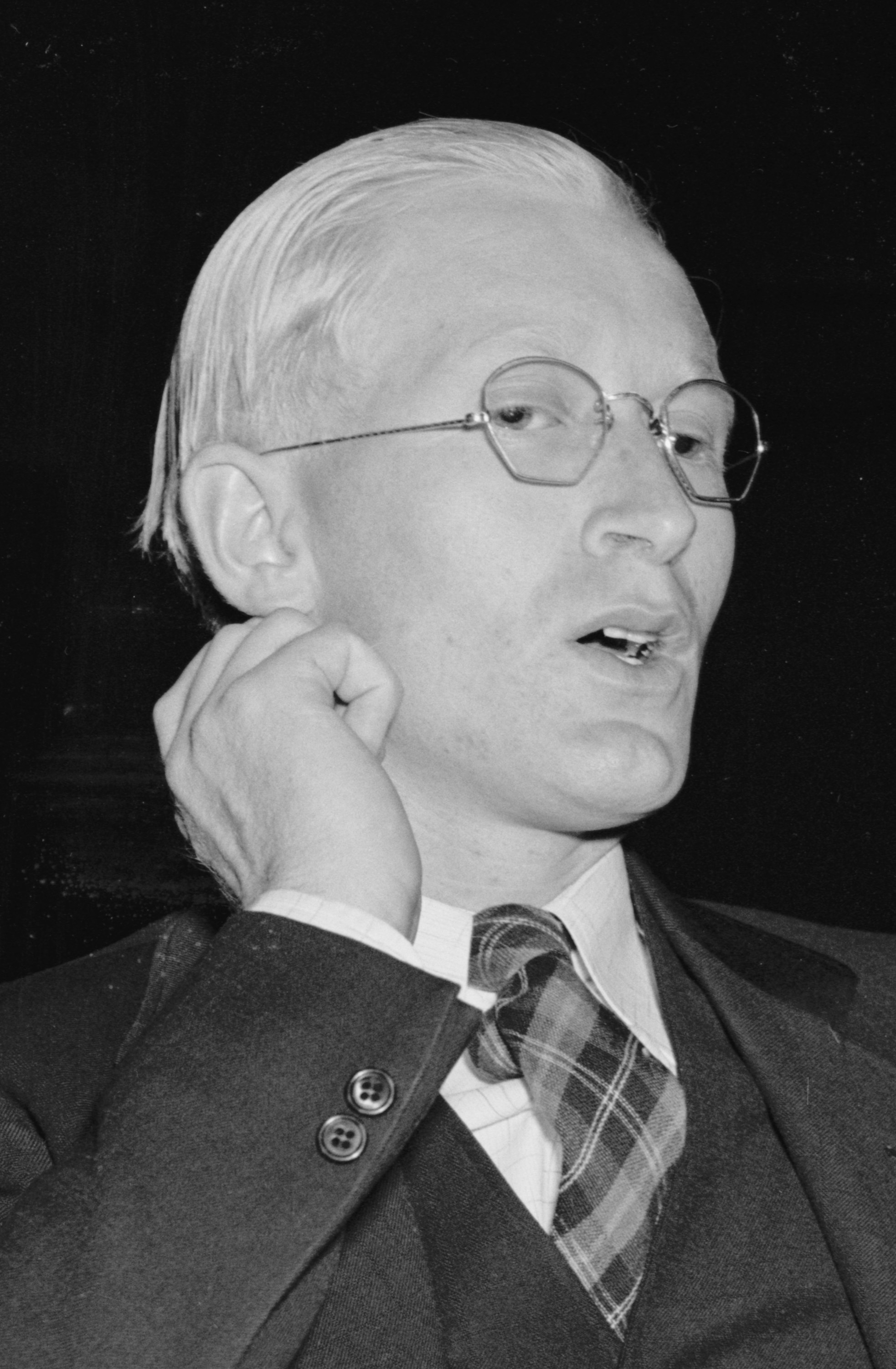
Kenneth Goff, anti-fluoridation and anti-communist preacher, is also claimed as the author

Some, including Morris Kominsky, suggest that the author was Kenneth Goff. Goff, a former Communist who later became a radical antisemite, authored numerous tracts on a variety of topics. He claimed that he had been "conditioned" into communism by Soviet forces, and some of his works prior to the publication of the manual dealt with brainwashing as a theme. Goff personally claimed that he was the original compiler of the book, but had not authored the material. After Goff died, far-right activist Gordon Mohr, who knew Goff, denied that Hubbard wrote it and instead credited it to Goff.

Several versions of the book list Goff as the author, while a number of publishers avoid the difficulty of authorship by listing the author as "anonymous." However, none of the versions attributed to him are dated and there is no evidence they predate the Scientology publication.

Kominsky claimed that Goff wrote it. Introvigne doubted that it had been written by Goff, calling the material far different than his style, which he called "quite unpolished" and lacking familiarity with psychological jargon. Introvigne concluded that "there is more evidence, and good arguments, for a Hubbard rather than a Goff authorship".

== Content ==
There are some differences in the various versions of the text in circulation.

=== Church of Scientology version ===
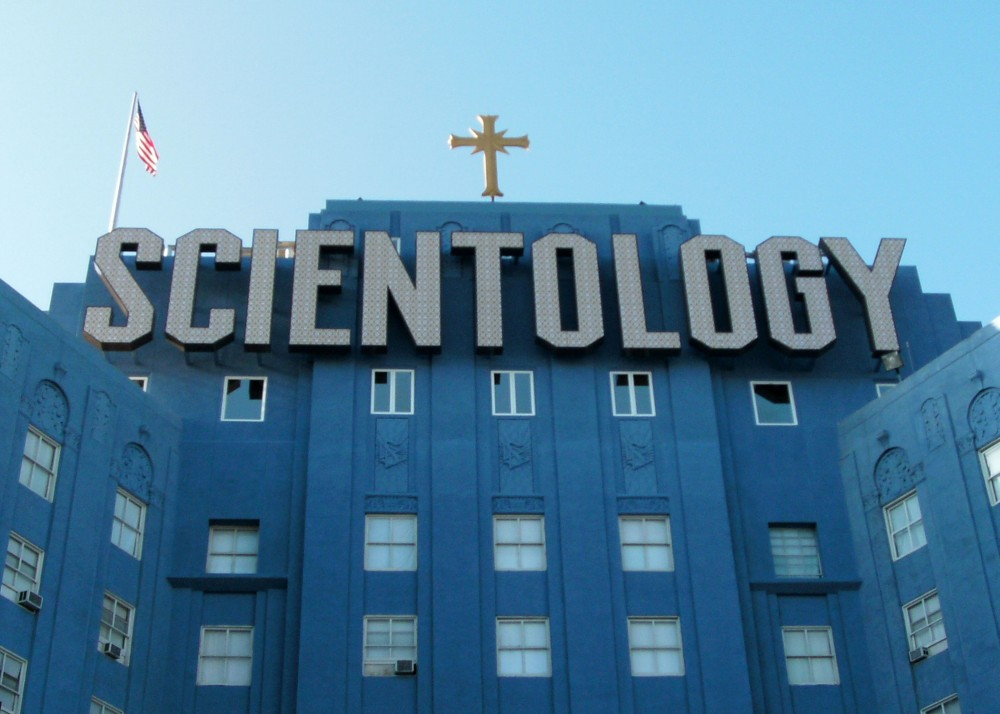
Scientology building in Los Angeles, California; according to the book Brain-Washing, the Church of Scientology is the greatest threat to the Soviet Union.

The Brain-Washing book is a generalist text, that abstractly discusses power, violence, coercion, and means of social control. Beria allegedly describes the following as Communist subversive activities directed from Moscow: the Vienna Psychoanalytic Society, (Note: Quote: "Vienna has been carefully maintained as the home of Psychopolitics, since it was the home of Psychoanalysis.") psychology professors, (Note: Quote: "You must work until every teacher of psychology unknowingly or knowingly teaches only Communist doctrine under the guise of "psychology". You must labour until every doctor and psychiatrist is either a psychopolitician or an unwitting assistant to our aims.") child labor laws, (Note: Quote: "Under the saccharine guise of assistance to them, rigorous child labour laws are the best means to deny the child any right in the society. By refusing to let him earn, by forcing him into unwanted dependence upon a grudging parent, by making certain in other channels that the parent is never in other than economic stress, the child can be driven in his teens into revolt. Delinquency will ensue.") psychiatric wards, (Note: Quote: "If a psychiatric ward could be established in every hospital in every city in a nation, it is certain that, at one time or another, every prominent citizen of that nation could come under the ministrations of psychopolitical operatives or their dupes.") psychedelic drugs (of note: LSD, peyote, mescaline), (Note: Quote: "When an hostile group dedicated to mental health is discovered, the psychopolitician should have recourse to the mechanisms of peyote, mescaline, and later drugs which cause temporary insanity. He should send persons, preferably those well under his control, into the mental health group, and invite the group, whether Christian Science or Church of Scientology or other practice, to demonstrate its abilities upon this new person.") brain surgery, (Note: Quote: "Brain surgery, as developed in Russia, should also be practiced by the psychopolitical operative in training, to give him full confidence in (1) the crudeness with which it can be done...") electric shock therapy, (Note: Quote: "Gradually, the public should be educated into electric shock, first by believing that it is very therapeutic, then by believing that it is quieting, then by being informed that electric shock usually injures the spine and teeth, and finally, that it very often kills or at least breaks the spine and removes, violently, the teeth of the patient. It is very doubtful if anyone from the lay levels of the public could tolerate the observation of a single electric shock treatment.") and the 1909 Income Tax Law of the United States. (Note: Quote: "The masses masses last come to believe that only excessive taxation of the rich can relieve them of the "burdensome leisure class" and can thus be brought to accept such a thing as income tax, a Marxist principle smoothly slid into Capitalistic framework in 1909 in the United States.")

An example of this generalized style can be found in chapter 6, where a relatively uninformed technique of control is described as...

"As an example of this, we find an individual refusing to obey and being struck. His refusal to obey is now less vociferous. He is struck again, and his resistance is lessened once more. He is hammered and pounded again and again, until, at length, his only thought is direct and implicit obedience to that person from whom the force has emanated."

According to the journalist Tony Ortega, the primary thesis of the work was "how to use psychiatry and psychology to carry out a communist takeover of the West," with critics and active communists calling it a "crude and laughable forgery," and Edward Hunter, author of Brainwashing In China, "described it as a fictional and inferior version of his own [book]."

In addition, the Church of Scientology is listed as the greatest enemy to Communism: "[The communist] operative should also spare no expense in smashing out of existence, by whatever means, any actual healing group, such as... Church of Scientology." The Church of Scientology is mentioned 5 times, but the Catholic Church is only mentioned 2 times. The Eastern Orthodox Church, which was the dominant religious belief in the Soviet Union at the time, is not mentioned at all. It also lists Christian Science as a target of this claimed plot by psychiatry.

=== Goff's version ===
The version distributed with Goff listed as the author is somewhat different in content. Unlike Hubbard's version it names the Pentecostalism as among the enemies of communism and mentioned the "Siberia Bill". Goff's version had a different introduction.

=== Other versions ===
For years after both Goff and Hubbard ceased distributing it, far-right groups kept it in print. These versions were largely based on Goff's version, but also added other items and new sections. Timothy McVeigh had read and recommended a pamphlet, Operation Vampire Killer 2000, that quoted Goff's version of the manual at length; the pamphlet claims Goff was the author and falsely claimed that he had been killed for writing it.

== See also ==
- Bibliography of Scientology
- Scientology controversies
- Red Scare
- Deprogramming
- Black propaganda
- The Protocols of the Elders of Zion
