= 1940 Rhode Island gubernatorial election =

- November 5, 1940
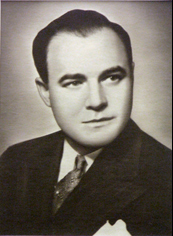

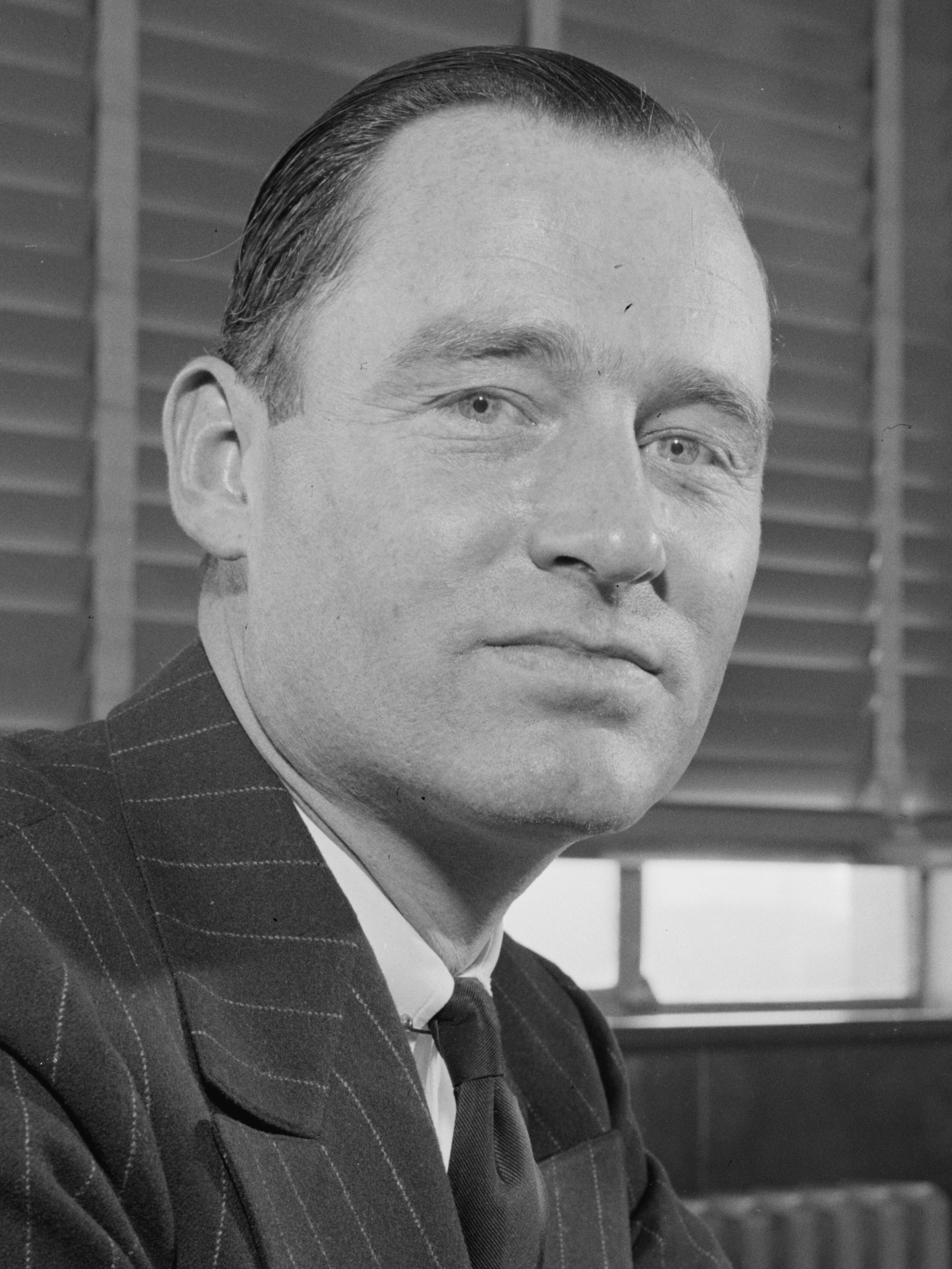
| Nominee | J. Howard McGrath | William Henry Vanderbilt III |
| Party | Democratic | Republican |
| Popular vote | 177,937 | 140,480 |
| Percentage | 55.84% | 44.08% |
- McGrath: 50–60% 60–70% 70–80% Vanderbilt: 50–60% 60–70% 70–80% Tie
Governor before election
William Henry Vanderbilt III
Republican
Elected Governor
J. Howard McGrath
Democratic

The 1940 Rhode Island gubernatorial election was held on November 5, 1940. Democratic nominee J. Howard McGrath defeated incumbent Republican William Henry Vanderbilt III with 55.84% of the vote.

== General election ==
=== Candidates ===
Major party candidates

- J. Howard McGrath, Democratic
- William Henry Vanderbilt III, Republican

Other candidates

- Wilfred J. Boissy, Communist

=== Results ===
1940 Rhode Island gubernatorial election
| Party | Candidate | Votes | % | ±% |
|---|---|---|---|---|
| Democratic | J. Howard McGrath | 177,937 | 55.84% | |
| Republican | William Henry Vanderbilt III (incumbent) | 140,480 | 44.08% | |
| Communist | Wilfred J. Boissy | 257 | 0.08% | |
| Majority | | 37,457 | | |
| Turnout | | | | |
| Democratic gain from Republican | | Swing | | |
