= Raymond E. Jordan =

American politician

Lieutenant Governor of Rhode Island
- In office 1937–1939
- Governor: Robert E. Quinn
- Preceded by: Robert E. Quinn
- Succeeded by: James O. McManus

Personal details
- Born: February 4, 1895 Pawtucket, Rhode Island
- Died: August 18, 1967 (aged 72) Providence, Rhode Island
- Party: Democratic

Raymond E. Jordan (April 2, 1895 – August 18, 1967) was an American politician. Between 1937 and 1939 he was lieutenant governor of the state of Rhode Island.

In 1936 Jordan was elected Lieutenant Governor of Rhode Island alongside Robert E. Quinn. He held this office between 1937 and 1939. He was Deputy Governor and Chairman of the State Senate. In 1938 he was defeated by James O. McManus. In July 1940 he participated as a delegate to the Democratic National Convention in Chicago, where President Franklin D. Roosevelt was nominated for the third time as a presidential candidate.

Political offices
Preceded by Robert E. Quinn	Lieutenant Governor of Rhode Island; 1937–1939	Succeeded by James O. McManus
