= 1944 Rhode Island gubernatorial election =

- November 7, 1944
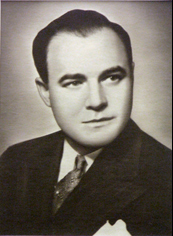

Nominee	J. Howard McGrath	Norman D. MacLeod
Party	Democratic	Republican
Popular vote	179,010	116,158
Percentage	60.65%	39.35%
Governor before election
J. Howard McGrath
Democratic
Elected Governor
J. Howard McGrath
Democratic

The 1944 Rhode Island gubernatorial election was held on November 7, 1944. Incumbent Democrat J. Howard McGrath defeated Republican nominee Norman D. MacLeod with 60.65% of the vote.

== General election ==
=== Candidates ===
- J. Howard McGrath, Democratic
- Norman D. MacLeod, Republican

=== Results ===
1944 Rhode Island gubernatorial election
Party	Candidate	Votes	%	±%
Democratic	J. Howard McGrath (incumbent)	179,010	60.65%	
Republican	Norman D. MacLeod	116,158	39.35%	
Majority		62,852		
Turnout				
Democratic hold		Swing		
