= M. Bernard Aidinoff =

American tax lawyer

- Born: Merton Bernard Aidinoff; February 2, 1929; Newport, Rhode Island, United States
- Died: August 8, 2016 (aged 87); New York City, United States
- Other name: Bernie Aidinoff
- Education: University of Michigan; Harvard Law School
- Occupation: Tax lawyer
- Employer: Sullivan & Cromwell (1956–1996)
- Spouses: Celia "Cissie" Spiro (m. 1956; died 1984) Elsie (née Vanderbilt) Newburg (m. 1996)
- Children: 2
- Relatives: William Henry Vanderbilt III (father-in-law)

Merton Bernard Aidinoff (February 2, 1929 – 8 August 2016) was an American tax lawyer, and partner at the firm of Sullivan & Cromwell. Prior to joining Sullivan & Cromwell, he served as law clerk to Judge Learned Hand of the United States Court of Appeals, Second Circuit. Aidinoff was a graduate of the University of Michigan and the Harvard Law School, where he was an editor of the Harvard Law Review.

== Early life ==
Merton Bernard Aidinoff, who was known as Bernie, was born on February 2, 1929, in Newport, Rhode Island. He was the son of Simon Aidinoff (1899–1950) and Ester (née Miller) Aidinoff (1902–1992) and the brother of Judith Aidinoff and Ruth Elkind.

He received his undergraduate degree from the University of Michigan, followed by a law degree from Harvard Law School in 1953 where he was an editor of the Harvard Law Review.

== Career ==
Following his law education, Aidinoff became a first lieutenant in the Army Judge Advocate General Corps. After this, he served as a law clerk for judge Learned Hand on the United States Court of Appeals for the Second Circuit. In 1956, Aidinoff joined the law firm of Sullivan & Cromwell, where his expertise was in the area of tax law. He would remain at Sullivan & Cromwell until his retirement in 1996.

Within the law profession, Aidinoff had several additional roles including chairman of the Section of Taxation of the American Bar Association, chairman of the Tax Program Committee of the American Law Institute, editor-in-chief of The Tax Layer, chairman of the Executive Committee of the Association of the Bar of the City of New York, and a member of the Commissioner's Advisory Committee of the Internal Revenue Service.

=== Volunteer and board involvement ===
Outside of the law profession, Aidinoff held various roles including a member of the board of directors of Goldman Sachs Philanthropy Fund, Human Rights First, and the Orchestra of St. Luke's. Additionally, Aidinoff was chairman of the board of the Foundation for a Civil Society

He was a member of the Council on Foreign Relations, The Century Association, India House and the Metropolitan Club in Washington. He also served as a member of the board of AIG.

== Personal life ==
In 1956, he married Celia "Cissie" Spiro (d. 1984), who eventually became the vice president of the Legal Aid Society in New York and the deputy chairwoman of the Democratic National Committee in 1981 and 1982. They were the parents of Seth George Aidinoff, who married Lucie Livingston, and Gail Aidinoff Scovell.

In 1996, Aidinoff married Elsie (née Vanderbilt) Newburg, the daughter of former Rhode Island Governor William Henry Vanderbilt III from his second marriage to Anne Gordon Colby.

He died on August 8, 2016, in Manhattan, New York City.
