= 1942 Rhode Island gubernatorial election =

- November 3, 1942
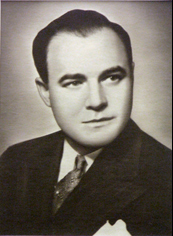

Nominee	J. Howard McGrath	James O. McManus
Party	Democratic	Republican
Popular vote	139,407	98,741
Percentage	58.54%	41.46%
- McGrath: 50–60% 60–70% 70–80% McManus: 50–60% 60–70% 70–80%
Governor before election
J. Howard McGrath
Democratic
Elected Governor
J. Howard McGrath
Democratic

The 1942 Rhode Island gubernatorial election was held on November 3, 1942. Incumbent Democrat J. Howard McGrath defeated Republican nominee James O. McManus with 58.54% of the vote.

== General election ==
=== Candidates ===
- J. Howard McGrath, Democratic
- James O. McManus, Republican

=== Results ===
1942 Rhode Island gubernatorial election
Party	Candidate	Votes	%	±%
Democratic	J. Howard McGrath (incumbent)	139,407	58.54%	
Republican	James O. McManus	98,741	41.46%	
Majority		40,666		
Turnout				
Democratic hold		Swing		
