= 1938 Rhode Island gubernatorial election =

- November 8, 1938
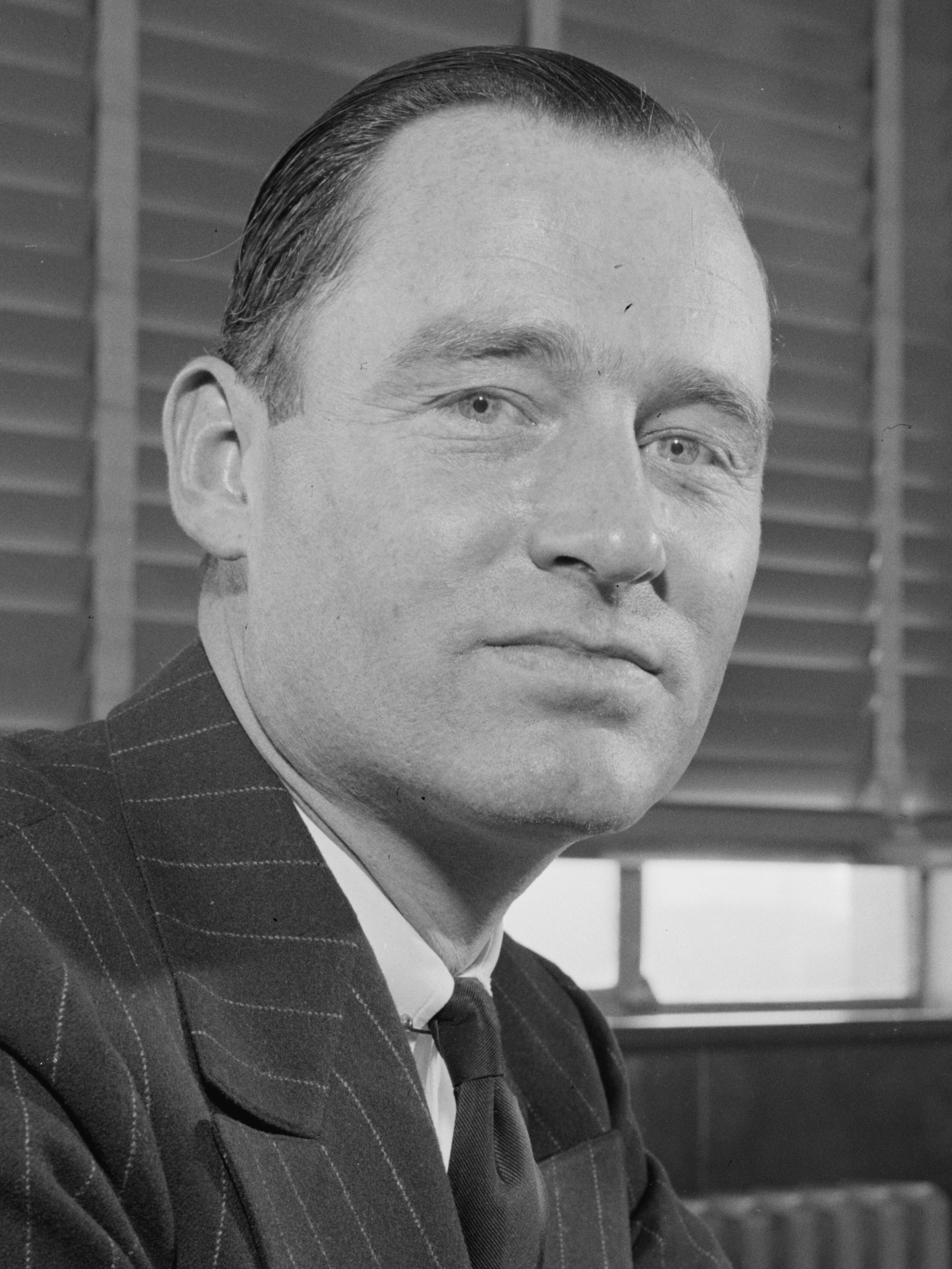

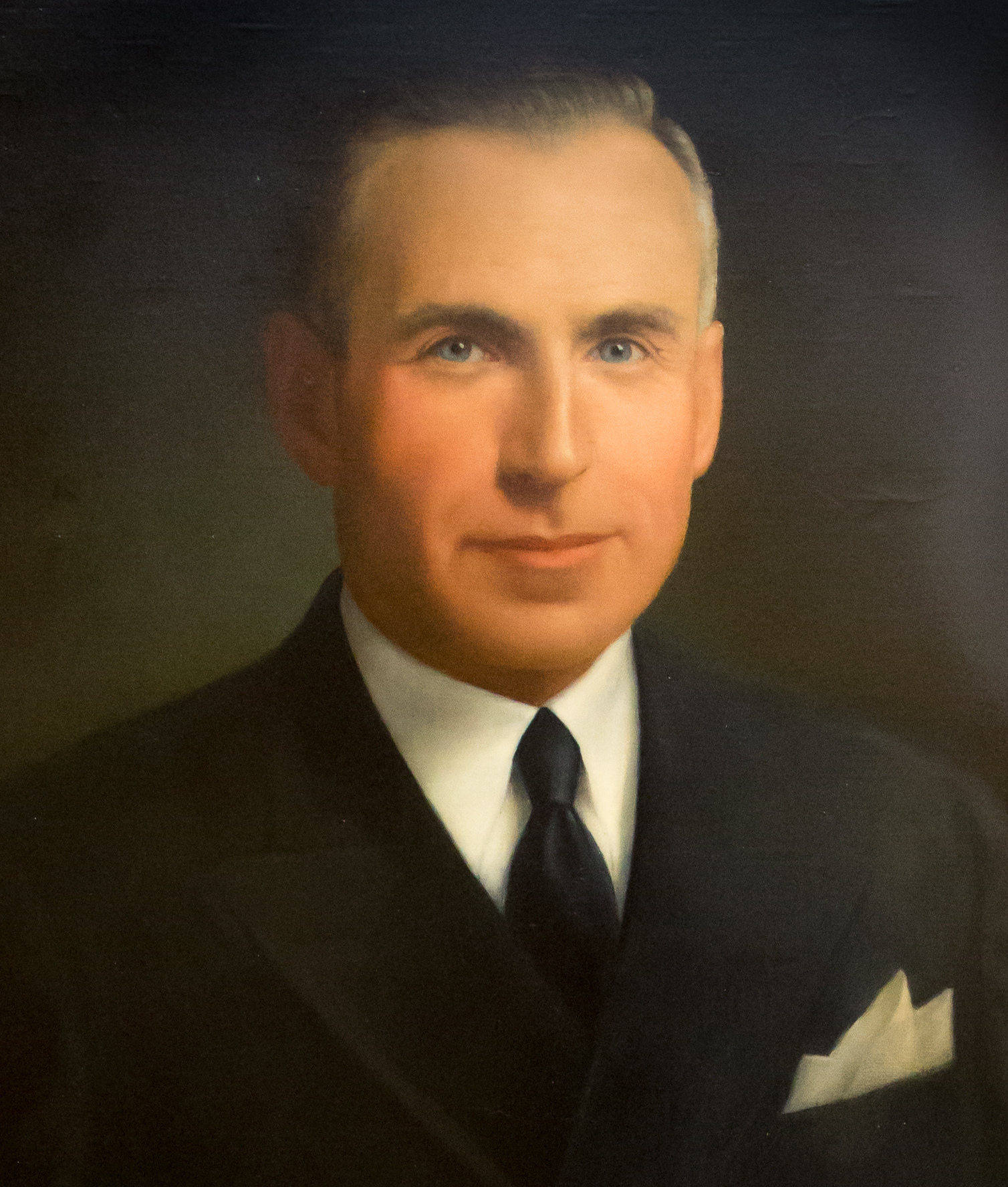
Nominee	William Henry Vanderbilt III	Robert E. Quinn
Party	Republican	Democratic
Popular vote	168,624	129,603
Percentage	54.17%	41.63%
Governor before election
Robert E. Quinn
Democratic
Elected Governor
William Henry Vanderbilt III
Republican

The 1938 Rhode Island gubernatorial election was held on November 8, 1938. Republican nominee William Henry Vanderbilt III defeated Democratic incumbent Robert E. Quinn with 54.17% of the vote. This was the last time until 1958 a Republican was elected Governor of Rhode Island.

== General election ==
=== Candidates ===
- Morris Kominsky (Communist)
- Walter E. O'Hara, president and managing director of the Narragansett Racing Association (Square Deal)
- Robert E. Quinn, incumbent governor (Democratic)
- William Henry Vanderbilt III, former state senator from Portsmouth and member of the Vanderbilt family (Republican)

=== Results ===
1938 Rhode Island gubernatorial election
Party	Candidate	Votes	%	±%
Republican	William Henry Vanderbilt III	168,624	54.17%	
Democratic	Robert E. Quinn (incumbent)	129,603	41.63%	
Independent	Walter E. O'Hara	12,696	4.08%	
Communist	Morris Kominsky	366	0.12%	
Majority		39,021		
Turnout				
Republican gain from Democratic		Swing		
