= James O. McManus =

American politician

Lieutenant Governor of Rhode Island
- In office January 3, 1939 – January 7, 1941
- Governor: William Henry Vanderbilt III
- Preceded by: Raymond E. Jordan
- Succeeded by: Louis W. Cappelli

Personal details
- Born: October 18, 1894 Philadelphia, Pennsylvania, US
- Party: Republican
- Spouse: Jeanette C. Burns (1928-?)

James O. McManus (born October 18, 1894 - December 17, 1970) was an American politician. Between 1939 and 1941 he was lieutenant governor of the state of Rhode Island.

James O. McManus was born in Philadelphia, a son of James and Mary (Hallinan) McManus. Both his parents were Irish immigrants. He received his early education in the public schools of Coventry, Kent County, and then attended Warwick High School, after which he became a student at Bryant & Stratton’s Business College, Providence. From there he went to Georgetown University, attending its law school, from which he graduated with the degree of Bachelor of Laws in 1920. He was admitted to the Rhode Island bar in 1921.

During the First World War he served in the US Navy. After the war, he served for five years as town solicitor for Coventry, for four years as the town's probate judge, and for four years as town coroner. In 1929 he served as recording clerk of the Rhode Island House of Representatives, and in 1930 he became reading clerk of the House.

Politically, he joined the Republican Party. In 1938 he was elected Lieutenant Governor of Rhode Island alongside William Henry Vanderbilt III. He held this office between 1939 and 1941. He was Deputy Governor and Chairman of the State Senate. In 1940 he ran unsuccessfully for the U.S. Senate. In 1942, he ran unsuccessfully for Governor of Rhode Island. Then his track is lost.

Party political offices
Preceded by Felix Hebert	Republican nominee for U.S. Senator from Rhode Island (Class 1); 1940	Succeeded by W. Gurnee Dwyer
Preceded by William Henry Vanderbilt III	Republican nominee for Governor of Rhode Island; 1942	Succeeded by Norman D. MacLeod
Political offices
Preceded by Raymond E. Jordan	Lieutenant Governor of Rhode Island; 1939–1941	Succeeded by Louis W. Cappelli
