= J. Howard McGrath =

American politician (1903–1966)

Howard McGrath
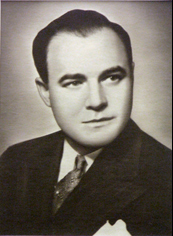

60th United States Attorney General
- In office August 23, 1949 – April 3, 1952
- President: Harry S. Truman
- Preceded by: Tom C. Clark
- Succeeded by: James P. McGranery

United States Senator from Rhode Island
- In office January 3, 1947 – August 23, 1949
- Preceded by: Peter G. Gerry
- Succeeded by: Edward L. Leahy

Chair of the Democratic National Committee
- In office October 29, 1947 – August 24, 1949
- Preceded by: Robert E. Hannegan
- Succeeded by: William M. Boyle

27th Solicitor General of the United States
- In office October 6, 1945 – October 25, 1946
- President: Harry S. Truman
- Preceded by: Charles Fahy
- Succeeded by: Philip Perlman

60th Governor of Rhode Island
- In office January 7, 1941 – October 6, 1945
- Lieutenant: Louis W. Cappelli; John Pastore
- Preceded by: William Henry Vanderbilt III
- Succeeded by: John Pastore

U.S. Attorney for the District of Rhode Island
- In office 1934–1940
- President: Franklin D. Roosevelt
- Preceded by: Henry Boss
- Succeeded by: George Troy

Personal details
- Born: James Howard McGrath; November 28, 1903 Woonsocket, Rhode Island, U.S.
- Died: September 2, 1966 (aged 62) Narragansett, Rhode Island, U.S.
- Party: Democratic
- Spouse: Estelle Cadorette
- Children: 1
- Education: Providence College (BA); Boston University (LLB)

James Howard McGrath (November 28, 1903 – September 2, 1966) was an American politician and attorney from Rhode Island. McGrath, a Democrat, served as U.S. Attorney for Rhode Island before becoming governor, U.S. Solicitor General, U.S. Senator, chairman of the Democratic National Committee, and Attorney General of the United States.

== Early life ==
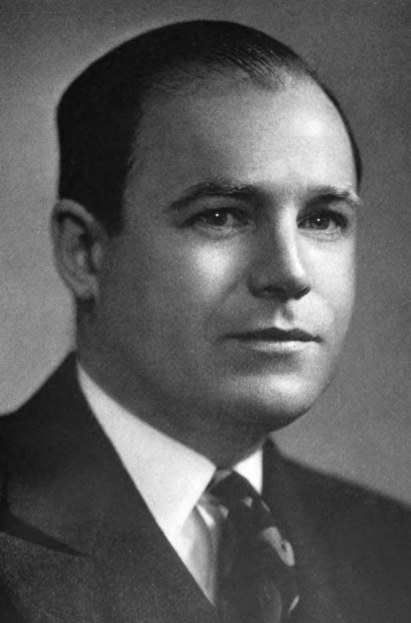
McGrath as governor.

Born in Woonsocket, Rhode Island. McGrath was the son of James J. McGrath and the former Ida E. May. He graduated from the La Salle Academy in 1922, attended Providence College, and went to the Boston University School of Law in 1929. McGrath married Estelle A. Cadorette on November 28, 1929; they adopted a son. David.

From 1930 to 1934, he was the city solicitor of Central Falls, Rhode Island. During this time he was also interested in the real estate, insurance, and banking industries. He served as United States Attorney for the District of Rhode Island from 1934 to 1940.

== Governor of Rhode Island ==
From 1941 to 1945, McGrath was Governor of Rhode Island, reorganizing the juvenile court system while sponsoring a workers' compensation fund and a labor relations board, but he resigned in the middle of his third term to accept appointment as Solicitor General of the United States (1945–1946). As governor, McGrath presided over a limited-purpose state constitutional convention in 1944.

... convention convened at the Rhode Island College of Education auditorium in Providence, March 28, 1944 for the purpose of amending the State constitution to eliminate voting registration requirements by members of the armed forces, merchant marines or persons absent from the state performing services connecting with military operations. Delegate continent totaled 200 with Governor J. Howard McGrath serving as president & William A. Needham of Providence as Secretary. Proposal put before the voters at a special election held April 11, 1944. Amendment passed with 7,122 voting for & 119 against.

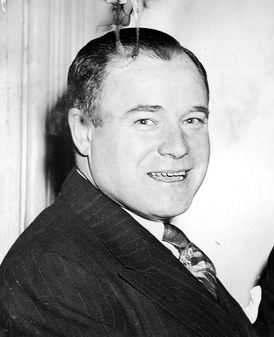
McGrath as a senator.

McGrath was elected as a Democrat to the United States Senate from Rhode Island in 1946 to join a Congress (the Eightieth, 1947 to 1949), where the opposition Republican Party had just replaced Democratic majorities in both houses. (See United States elections, 1946.)

He was briefly chairman of the U.S. Senate Committee on the District of Columbia for the 81st Congress (to which the 1948 election had returned Democratic majorities). In the Senate, McGrath opposed reducing wartime economic controls and taxes, wishing to spend the latter instead on Social Security, national health insurance, and education.

In March 1946, McGrath spoke at a rally of 20,000 participants in Madison Square Garden protesting against Britain's recent reversal of its pro-Zionist policies in Mandatory Palestine. McGrath supported the establishment of a Jewish state, declaring that the "time has come for the Jewish Nation to reclaim Palestine."

== Chairman of Democratic National Committee ==
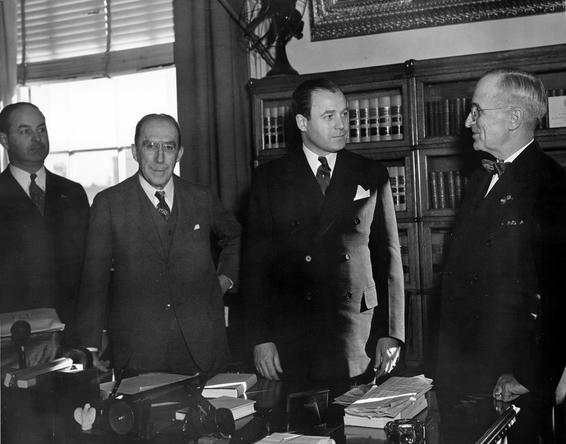
McGrath (middle) with Theodore Francis Green (middle left) and Harry S. Truman (far right).

He was chairman of the Democratic National Committee from 1947 to 1949. In managing President Harry Truman's successful 1948 election campaign, McGrath alienated white Southerners but won over crucial black constituencies by integrating the Democratic national headquarters staff. He would notably announce Truman's victory on election night.

== Attorney General ==
Truman appointed McGrath Attorney General of the United States on August 24, 1949. After McGrath had refused to co-operate in a corruption investigation initiated by his own department, Truman asked for and received McGrath's resignation on April 3, 1952.

Alternative accounts have contradictorily suggested that after a meeting of the Joint Chiefs of Staff at Truman's "Little White House" in Key West, the Secretary of the Navy, along with other members, had threatened to resign if they, too, were forced to comply with Special Assistant Attorney General Newbold Morris's request for the personal records of all members who might have received gifts under the scope of the corruption investigation. Under pressure to follow through with the Justice Department corruption investigation, along with the threats of resignation, McGrath agreed that Morris's request was asking too much and that the best thing to do was to clean up the department from that point forward and leave the past alone. Truman had been backed into a corner, and the only way out was to ask for McGrath's resignation. That account was corroborated by a letter from Truman to McGrath, which hung in the hallway of McGrath's summer home in Narragansett, Rhode Island up to the time of his death in 1966.

McGrath entered the private practice of law in Washington, D.C. and Providence. In 1960, he was an unsuccessful candidate to succeed the retiring U.S. Sen. Theodore Francis Green (Democrat of Rhode Island), losing the Democratic primary (also contested by former governor Dennis J. Roberts) to Claiborne Pell.

McGrath died of a heart attack in Narragansett, Rhode Island on September 2, 1966, at the age of 62. His body was buried at the St. Francis Cemetery in Pawtucket, Rhode Island.

There is a bust of Senator McGrath outside the House chamber in the Rhode Island State House.

== Notes ==
Party political offices
Preceded by Robert E. Quinn	Democratic nominee for Governor of Rhode Island; 1940, 1942, 1944	Succeeded by John O. Pastore
Preceded by Peter G. Gerry	Democratic nominee for U.S. Senator from Rhode Island (Class 1); 1946	Succeeded by John O. Pastore
Preceded by Robert E. Hannegan	Chair of the Democratic National Committee; 1947–1949	Succeeded by William M. Boyle
Political offices
Preceded by William Henry Vanderbilt III	Governor of Rhode Island; 1941–1945	Succeeded by John O. Pastore
Legal offices
Preceded by Charles Fahy	United States Solicitor General; 1945–1946	Succeeded by Philip Perlman
Preceded by Tom C. Clark	United States Attorney General; 1949–1952	Succeeded by James P. McGranery
U.S. Senate
Preceded by Peter G. Gerry	U.S. Senator (Class 1) from Rhode Island; 1947–1949; Served alongside: Theodore F. Green	Succeeded by Edward L. Leahy
Preceded by C. Douglass Buck	Chair of the Senate District of Columbia Committee; 1949	Succeeded by Matthew M. Neely
