= Robert E. Quinn =

American judge

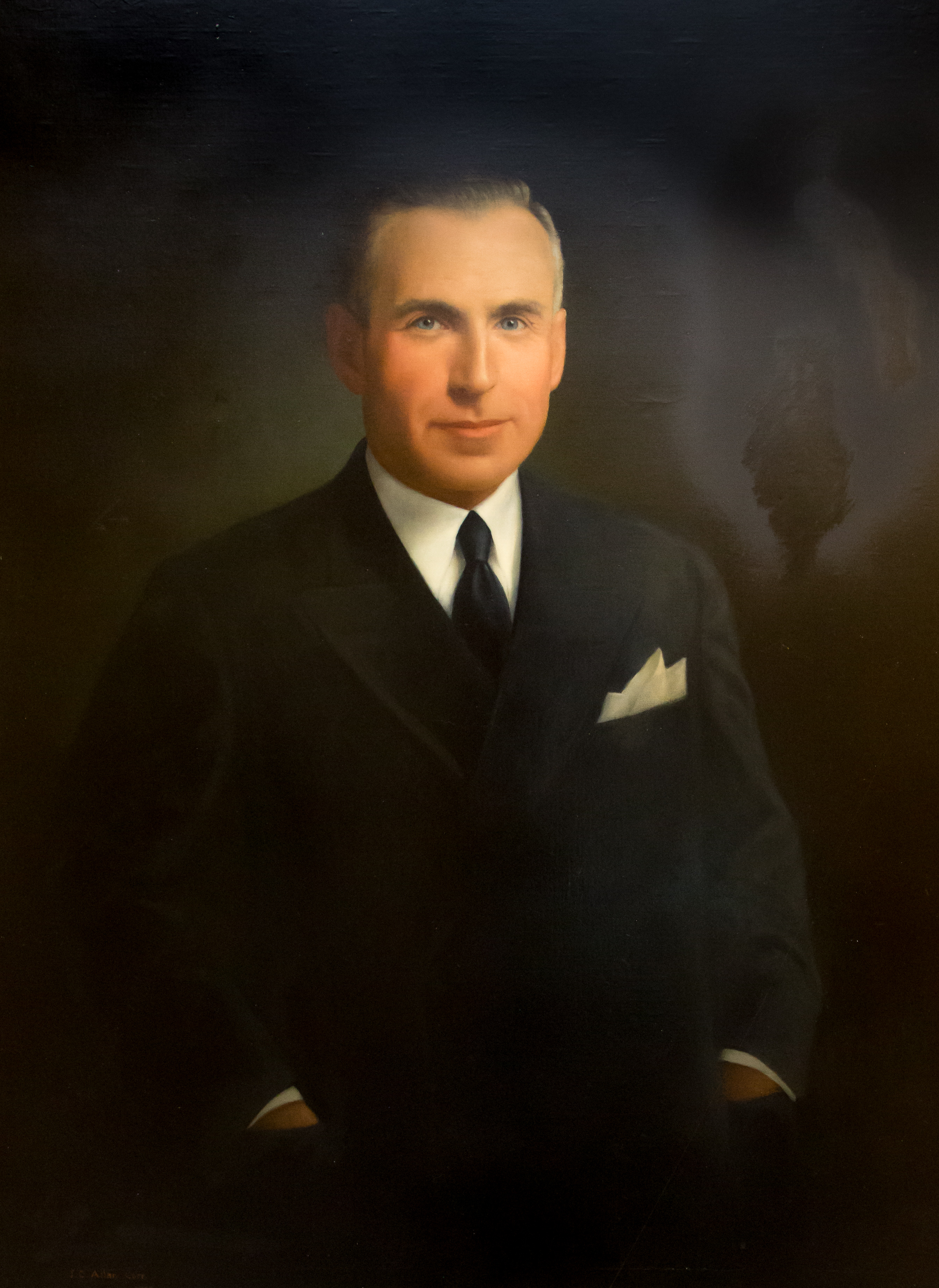

1st Chief Justice of the United States Court of Appeals for the Armed Forces
- In office June 20, 1951 – 1971
- President: Harry Truman
- Preceded by: (none)
- Succeeded by: William H. Darden

Judge of the United States Court of Military Appeals
- In office June 20, 1951 – 1971
- Appointed by: Harry S. Truman
- Preceded by: (none)
- Succeeded by: Matthew J. Perry

58th Governor of Rhode Island
- In office January 5, 1937 – January 3, 1939
- Lieutenant: Raymond E. Jordan
- Preceded by: Theodore F. Green
- Succeeded by: William Henry Vanderbilt III

75th Lieutenant Governor of Rhode Island
- In office January 3, 1933 – January 5, 1937
- Governor: Theodore F. Green
- Preceded by: James G. Connolly
- Succeeded by: Raymond E. Jordan

Member of the Rhode Island Senate
- In office 1923–1925; 1929–1933

Personal details
- Born: Robert Emmet Quinn; April 2, 1894 Phenix, Rhode Island, U.S.
- Died: May 19, 1975 (aged 81) Warwick, Rhode Island, U.S.
- Resting place: Quinn Family Cemetery; West Warwick, Rhode Island
- Party: Democratic
- Spouse: Mary Ide Carter Quinn
- Parent(s): Charles Quinn; Mary Ann (McCabe) Quinn
- Education: Brown University; Harvard Law School
- Profession: Attorney; Politician

Military service
- Branch/service: United States Foreign Service
- Years of service: 1917-1919
- Battles/wars: World War I

Robert Emmet Quinn (April 2, 1894 – May 19, 1975) was an American attorney and politician from Rhode Island. He served as the 58th governor of Rhode Island and judge for the Rhode Island Superior Court.

== Early life ==
Quinn was born in 1894 in Phenix, Rhode Island, the son of Charles Quinn and Mary Ann (McCabe) Quinn. He graduated from Brown University in 1915, and completed his law degree from Harvard Law School in 1918. He served in the United States Foreign Service during World War I as a member of the U.S. Diplomatic Intelligence Service in England and France. After he left the Foreign Service in 1919, he practiced law with his uncle in Rhode Island.

== Political career ==
He began his political career as a Democrat in the Rhode Island Senate serving from 1923 to 1925 and again from 1929 to 1933. In 1932 he was elected Lieutenant Governor of Rhode Island and served from 1933 to 1937. He served as governor from 1937 to 1939.

=== State Senate ===
Quinn entered the Rhode Island Senate in 1923 as one of a trio of young progressive politicians, a group which included Governor William S. Flynn and Lt. Governor Felix A. Toupin. Their agenda of reform included a 48-hour work week and an end to property qualifications for voting in city council elections. The Republican-controlled state senate blocked these reforms, and the 1923 and 1924 sessions were spent mostly in deadlock.

Finally, in June 1924, Quinn and Lt. Governor Toupin came up with a desperate plan: they would stage a marathon multi-day filibuster. Toupin read from "Hamlet" and the Encyclopædia Britannica, in hopes that enough exhausted Republicans would leave the chamber, giving Democrats the majority they needed to pass the measure. By June 19, Republicans had had enough, and sent a Boston gangster to set off a bromine gas bomb in the Senate chamber. Quinn and Toupin were unhurt, but the entire Republican delegation fled the chamber, and indeed fled the state. The Senate was then unable to form a quorum to get anything done. The Providence Journal blamed the gas attack on the Democrats, who lost widely in November 1924.

=== Lieutenant governor ===
Quinn was elected lieutenant governor in 1932 and re-elected in 1934.

==== "Bloodless Revolution" ====
As the president of the Rhode Island Senate, Quinn was a key actor during the "Bloodless Revolution" on January 1, 1935. Using his power as the presiding officer, he prevented two Republican state senators from being seated and eventually enabled a Democratic majority to be formed in the Senate, the first time this had happened since the Civil War.

=== Governor ===
He was nominated for governorship of Rhode Island when incumbent Governor Theodore Francis Green chose to run for a seat in the United States Senate.

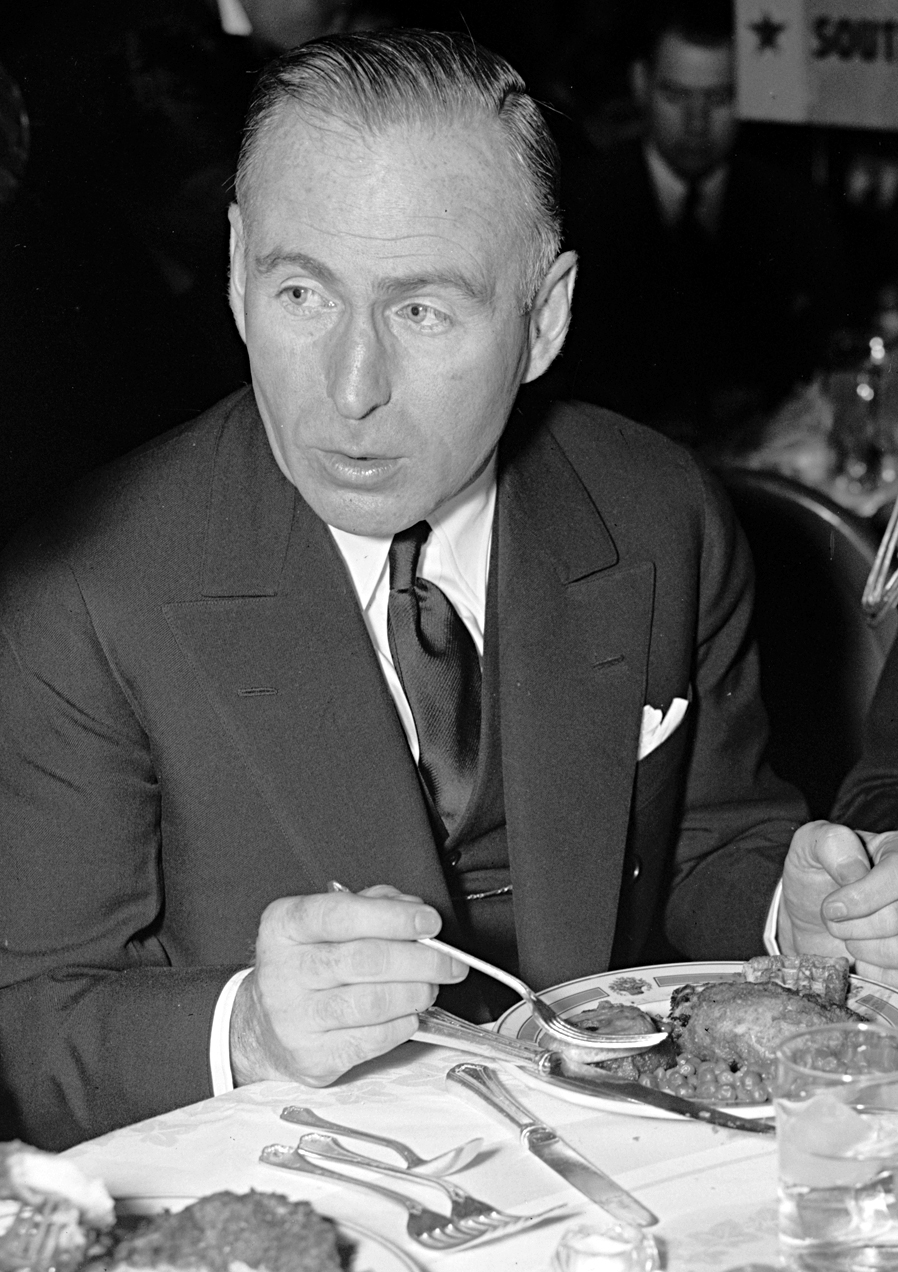
1937 Library of Congress photo

He held the governor's office from January 5, 1937, to January 3, 1939. During his administration, Quinn advocated a merit system for state workers, a personal income tax, and exemption for the poor from real estate taxes. Nicknamed "Fighting Bob", he set up a battle known as the "Race Track War" against the highly successful Thoroughbred racing venue Narragansett Park in 1937. From the first incident on September 2, the "War" would not be resolved until October 16. The National Guard was called out and men with machine guns blocked the front entrance to the track. Time Magazine reported the story nationwide in October 1937. Quinn won in the short-term, as Walter O'Hara was removed from his post as president and manager of the Narragansett Racing Association, and Judge James E. Dooley officially took control of the track. Quinn was unsuccessful in his re-election bid in 1938 when he lost to millionaire William Henry Vanderbilt III, a brother to Alfred Gwynne Vanderbilt Jr. who was a major figure in Thoroughbred racing. Ultimately, the "Race Track War" was considered a national embarrassment.

=== Superior Court ===
Quinn returned to his law practice after leaving the governor's office. He won appointment to a Superior Court judgeship in 1941, serving as judge for the Rhode Island Superior Court. During World War II, he entered the military as a commander in the navy's legal branch. He served for four years, rising to the rank of captain. He returned to the bench after the end of the war.

=== United States Court of Appeals for the Armed Forces ===
On May 22, 1951 he was nominated by President Truman as Chief Judge of a new United States Court of Military Appeals. He was confirmed by the Senate June 19, and was sworn the next day, June 20 of 1951. He was reappointed to his position as Chief Justice by President Johnson for another 15-year term, but he retired from that in 5 years in 1971. He fully retired from the court in 1975, shortly before his death.

In 1964 he was awarded the first honorary life membership by the Federal Bar Association, and in 1966 he was elected to the Rhode Island Hall of Fame.

== Death ==
Quinn died on May 19, 1975, at age 81 in a Kent nursing home in Warwick. He is interred at Quinn Family Cemetery in West Warwick.

== Family life ==
In 1923, Quinn married Mary Carter. They had five children including Norma Marie, Robert Carter, Pauline, Cameron Peter and Penelope Dorr.

Judge Quinn was my mother's (Isabella Catlow) godfather. She was born in Centreville RI in 1915. I wish I knew the connection which resulted in this relationship.

Party political offices
Preceded by Theodore F. Green	Democratic nominee for Governor of Rhode Island; 1936, 1938	Succeeded by J. Howard McGrath
Political offices
Preceded by James G. Connolly	Lieutenant Governor of Rhode Island; 1933–1937	Succeeded by Raymond E. Jordan
Preceded by Theodore F. Green	Governor of Rhode Island; 1937–1939	Succeeded by William Henry Vanderbilt III
