= Morris Kominsky =

American writer (1901–1975)

- Born: September 28, 1901
- Died: April 13, 1975 (aged 73)
- Occupation: Writer

Morris Kominsky (September 28, 1901 — April 13, 1975) was an American communist and the writer of The Hoaxers: Plain Liars, Fancy Liars and Damned Liars (1970).

== Biography ==
The Hoaxers was intended, as stated in its preface, to be the first of two volumes in his "study of the trends in the United States of America towards Fascism and a Third World War." The second volume America Faces Disaster was never published; Kominsky indicated he intended that it would tell "the story of the groups, individuals, and policies that endanger the citizens of the U.S.A., as well as the rest of mankind" (Kominsky 14). Prior to publishing The Hoaxers, the working title for the two volumes was Countdown—USA

The Hoaxers is a "special study of the use of fabrications, distortions of truth, and out-of-context quotations." It examines such works as The Protocols of the Elders of Zion, the "Ten Cannots" of William J. H. Boetcker commonly misattributed to Abraham Lincoln and conspiracy theories such as the Bilderberg Group Conspiracy and the Illuminati. The book received favorable advance comments from Robert W. Kenny and Congressman Dalip Singh Saund among others, as printed on the dustcover.

Kominsky had run in 1938 for Governor of Rhode Island as the candidate of the Communist Party USA, losing to Republican William Henry Vanderbilt III.

Collections of Kominsky's papers are held at the Southern California Library for Social Studies and Research in Los Angeles, California and the American Jewish Archives in Cincinnati.

He was married and had a daughter.

He killed himself April 13, 1975, aged 73. A local obituary noted him as a "controversial figure".

== Works ==
- Kominsky, Morris (1970). The Hoaxers: Plain Liars, Fancy Liars, and Damned Liars Branden Press, Inc. Boston, Massachusetts ISBN 0-8283-1288-5

== Sources ==
- The Political Graveyard: Rhode Island: Governors
- Morris Kominsky's The Hoaxers, Grand Lodge of British Columbia and Yukon
- Social Security Death Index
