= Ernest L. Sprague =

Former Secretary of State of Rhode Island

Ernest L. Sprague (1876 – 1944) was a politician from the U.S. state of Rhode Island. He is best known for serving as the Secretary of State of Rhode Island from 1924 to 1932.

He was a member of the Sprague family, an American business and political family in Rhode Island and Massachusetts.
