= William Henry Vanderbilt III =

American politician (1901–1981)

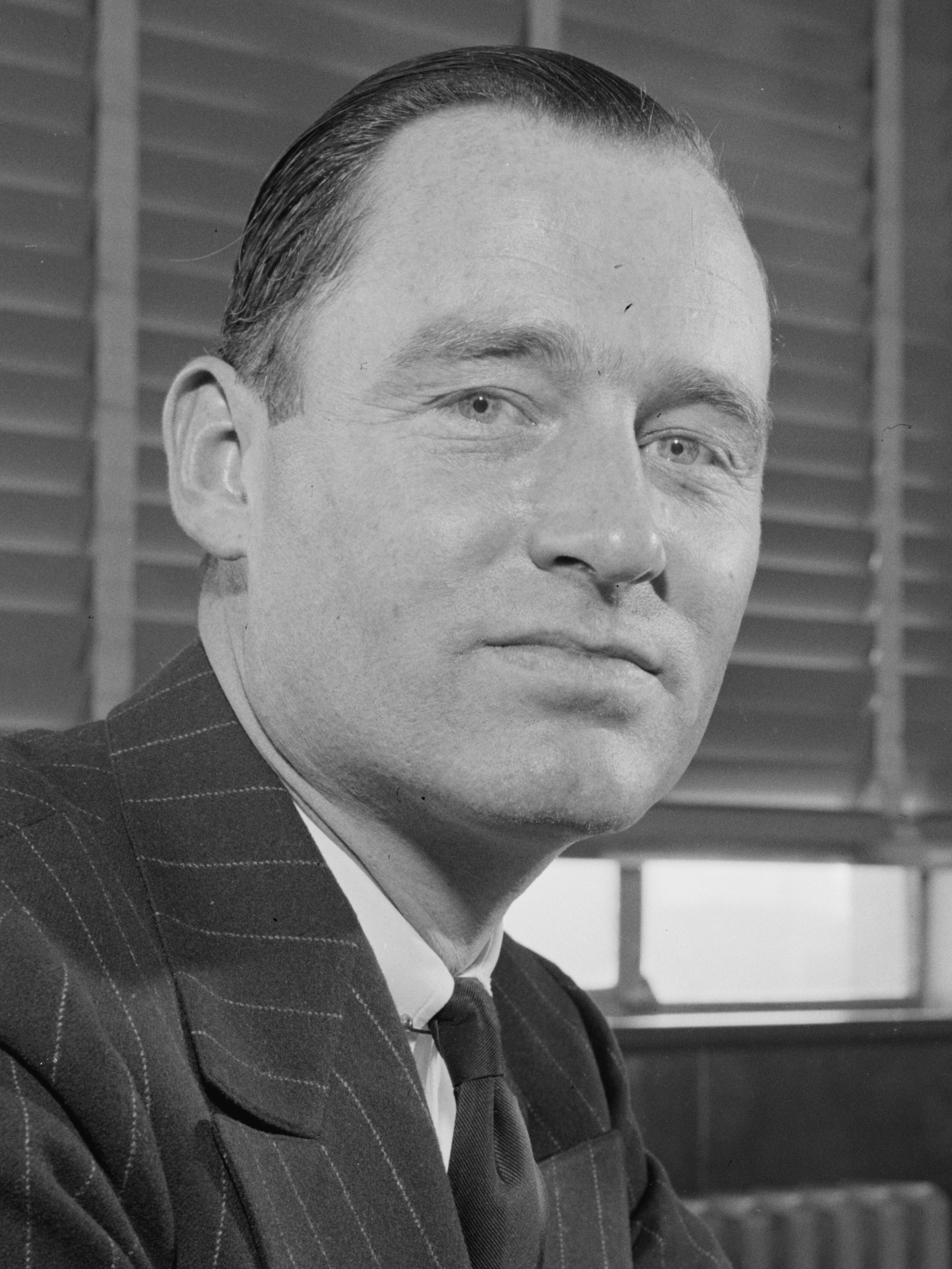

Chair of the National Governors Association
- In office June 2, 1940 – January 7, 1941
- Preceded by: Lloyd C. Stark
- Succeeded by: Harold Stassen

59th Governor of Rhode Island
- In office January 3, 1939 – January 7, 1941
- Lieutenant: James O. McManus
- Preceded by: Robert E. Quinn
- Succeeded by: J. Howard McGrath

Personal details
- Born: William Henry Vanderbilt III; November 24, 1901 New York City, U.S.
- Died: April 14, 1981 (aged 79) Williamstown, Massachusetts, U.S.
- Party: Republican
- Spouses: Emily O'Neill Davies (m. 1923; div. 1928) Anne Gordon Colby (m. 1929; div. 1969) Helen Cummings Cook (m. 1970)
- Children: 4
- Parent(s): Alfred Gwynne Vanderbilt; Ellen French
- Education: Princeton University

Military service
- Allegiance: United States
- Branch/service: United States Navy Reserve
- Rank: Midshipman
- Unit: USS Vesuvius (1888); USS Evans (DD-78)
- Battles/wars: World War I

William Henry Vanderbilt III (November 24, 1901 – April 14, 1981) was an American politician who served as Governor of Rhode Island from 1939 to 1941, and a member of the wealthy and socially prominent Vanderbilt family.

== Early life ==
Vanderbilt was born in New York City on November 24, 1901. He was the son of Alfred Gwynne Vanderbilt Sr and Ellen "Elsie" French. Vanderbilt's father was a great-grandson of Cornelius Vanderbilt, who founded the family fortune in railroads and shipping. His mother Elsie was the daughter of Francis Ormond French, President of the Manhattan Trust Company, and Ellen Tuck, who was a daughter of New Hampshire politician Amos Tuck and half-sister of Diplomat Edward Tuck. Elsie's brother was the banker Amos Tuck French.

William Vanderbilt's parents divorced in 1908, and his father remarried in late 1911 to the divorced heiress Margaret Emerson McKim. Through his father's second marriage Vanderbilt gained two half-brothers, Alfred G. Vanderbilt Jr. and George Washington Vanderbilt III. In 1919 Vanderbilt's mother Elsie remarried to one of her son's close friends, Naval Officer Lieutenant Paul Fitzsimons; at the time of the marriage Elsie was aged 38, whilst Lt. Fitzsimons was 28.

=== Education ===
Vanderbilt was educated at St. George's School in Middletown, Rhode Island (Class of 1919) and the Evans School in Mesa, Arizona. He attended Princeton University but dropped out during his first year. In 1940, Vanderbilt received an honorary LL.D. from Bates College.

== Career ==
=== First World War ===
Shortly before the United States declared war on Germany during the First World War, Vanderbilt dropped out of St. George's School upon his appointment as a midshipman in the U.S. Naval Coast Defense Reserve to rank from March 20, 1917. As he was only 15 at the time, he was one of the youngest Americans to have served in the war.

During his service in the Navy, Vanderbilt served on the torpedo test ship USS Vesuvius from April 17 to May 31, 1917, the Naval Torpedo Station in Newport from June 1, 1917 to March 7, 1918, aide for information Second Naval District from March 7 to July 15, 1918, in Norfolk, Virginia from July 23 to September 16, 1918, New London, Connecticut from September 19 to November 14, 1918 and as a plank owner of the newly commissioned destroyer USS Evans from November 11, 1918 to August 30, 1919. While serving on the Evans, Vanderbilt went on a cruise to Europe from June to August 1919. He was discharged from the Navy shortly after the end of the cruise, having not yet reached his 18th birthday.

=== The Short Line ===
In 1925, Vanderbilt started a coach bus company, called The Short Line, carrying passengers between Newport and Providence. Within a few years he expanded the business to serve points throughout New England and New York. The Short Line was purchased by George Sage in 1955 and, in 1970, was renamed Bonanza Bus Lines. Bonanza eventually merged with the Coach USA bus line in 1998 and was sold to Peter Pan Bus Lines in 2003. The Short Line's original terminal building in Newport still stands and is located near the intersection of Spring and Touro streets.

As a state senator and successful business leader, Vanderbilt was also a champion of the Mount Hope Bridge which connects Aquidneck Island with the mainland on the road north to Providence, Rhode Island from Newport. He was named the Chairman of the Mount Hope Bridge Commission and gave the opening address at the bridge's dedication on October 24, 1929. When it was completed, the Mount Hope Bridge was the longest suspension bridge in New England, and one of the longest in the country.

=== Political career ===
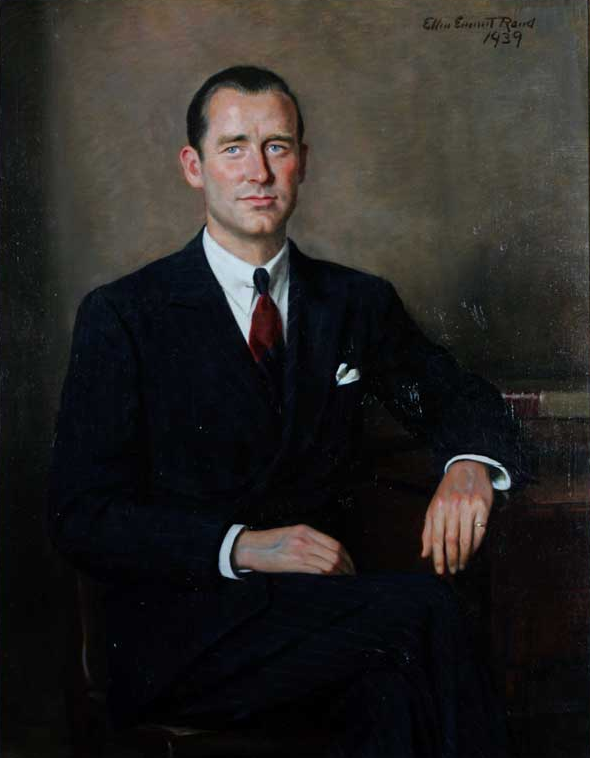
Gubernatorial portrait by Ellen Emmet Rand, 1939

Vanderbilt was a member of the Republican Party. In 1928 he was a delegate to the Republican National Convention from Rhode Island and that year was elected to the Rhode Island State Senate. Vanderbilt served in the State Senate for six years (1929–1935) and then took time off to be with his ailing wife, Anne Gordon Colby. On her recovery, he re-entered political life and successfully ran for Governor of Rhode Island in 1938. He served one two-year term from January 1939 to January 1941. His refusal to dole out patronage to fellow Republicans, however, weakened his power base, and a scandal over wire-tapping by a private detective firm he had hired to investigate election fraud, cost him re-election in 1940.

=== Navy service during World War II ===
In May 1941 Vanderbilt, an officer in the Naval Reserve, was called to active duty in June 1941 with the rank of lieutenant commander and initially assigned to the Panama Canal Zone. He was promoted to commander on August 15, 1942. In 1942 Vanderbilt was assigned as executive officer of the Special Operations Branch of the Office of Strategic Services (OSS) under General William J. Donovan. In May 1944 he was assigned to the staff of Admiral Chester W. Nimitz, commander in chief of the Pacific Fleet, in Pearl Harbor, Hawaii. He was promoted to the rank of captain prior to the end of the war.

=== Later life ===
After his discharge from the Navy at the end of the war, Vanderbilt left Rhode Island and retired to a farm in South Williamstown, Massachusetts. Oakland Farm and its 150 acres in Portsmouth, Rhode Island was sold to Robert R. Young and divided into housing lots by the end of the 1940s.

== Inheritance ==
In 1915 Vanderbilt's father Alfred G. Vanderbilt Senior died in the Sinking of the RMS Lusitania. Reports of the appraisal of Alfred's estate submitted to the New York County Surrogate's Court 1917 noted that provisions made for William in his father's will included:

- A Trust Fund valued at $4,612,086 ($109,789,986.59 in 2023 when adjusted for inflation);
- The 450 acre (1.8 km^{2}) Oakland Farm Estate in Portsmouth, Rhode Island;
- A life interest in $400,000 trust fund for the maintenance of Oakland Farm; and,
- The Congressional Gold Medal presented by the 38th US Congress to William's great-great grandfather Cornelius 'the Commodore' Vanderbilt I in 1864.

Following the death of William's paternal grandmother Alice Claypoole Vanderbilt in 1934, he and his half-brothers Alfred Gwynne Vanderbilt Jr. and George W. Vanderbilt III shared a $500,000 bequest from their grandmother's will.

William's mother Ellen "Elsie" French Vanderbilt Fitzsimons died in 1948; when her estate was eventually appraised in the Newport County Probate Court in 1953, the contents of her will revealed that she had bequeathed to William:

- The bulk of her personal estate; the gross value had been assessed at $338,650 before the deduction of expenses, taxes, and other minor bequests, with William ultimately receiving $114,611;
- Her primary residence, "Harbour View", in Newport;
- Other Newport Real Estate she owned; and,
- Her interest in a trust indenture she and William's father Alfred had executed on 25 March 1908. The trust fund had been created during Alfred and Elsie's divorce proceedings, and was reportedly worth $10,000,000 when it was created in 1908.

== Personal life ==
Vanderbilt married Emily O'Neill Davies (1903–1935), granddaughter of Daniel O'Neill, owner of the Pittsburgh Dispatch newspaper, and daughter of Frederick Martin Davies on November 1, 1923 at Grace Church, New York. Emily was the grandniece of Frederick Townsend Martin, a prominent writer of the 1920s. The couple gave birth to a daughter:

- Emily "Paddy" Vanderbilt (1925–2024), who married Jeptha Wade, both graduates of MIT.

The couple's marriage was troubled and Emily sued for divorce in Paris in the summer of 1926, but reconciled. She again sued for divorce in Newport, Rhode Island which was granted in June 1928. She later married Sigourney Thayer (1896–1944), for less than a year, and then Raoul Whitfield (1896–1945), shortly before her death in 1935.

On December 27, 1929, Vanderbilt married for the second time to Anne Gordon Colby (1909–1974) of West Orange, New Jersey. Together, they had three children:

- Anne Vanderbilt (1931–2014), who was married Samuel Adams Hartwell, Sr.
- Elsie Vanderbilt, who married Andre Walter George Newburg (1928–2018) in 1954 and M. Bernard Aidinoff (1929–2016) in 1996.
- William Henry Vanderbilt IV (b. 1945), who married Ann Swanson in Boston on 22 December 1967.

This marriage also ended in divorce in 1969 after 40 years of marriage, and Vanderbilt promptly remarried the following year to Helen Cummings Cook (died 1997), who was previously married to John R. Cook, founder of Warren Cable Co., who survived him in death.

=== Death and estate ===
Vanderbilt died of cancer on April 14, 1981, at the age of 79. He was buried in the Southlawn Cemetery in Williamstown, Massachusetts. He is one of the few descendants of William Henry Vanderbilt not to be buried in the family tomb on Staten Island. His estate, filed in the Berkshire County Probate Court in April 1982, was valued at approximately $1.7 million. He bequeathed the 1864 Congressional Gold Medal which had been awarded to his great-great-grandfather Cornelius Vanderbilt (which had passed to William under the will of his father Alfred) to his only son, William H. Vanderbilt IV, who later donated the medal and several other family heirlooms to Vanderbilt University in 2022.

== Awards ==
For his service in the Navy, Vanderbilt was entitled to the following medals:

- World War I Victory Medal
- Naval Reserve Medal
- American Defense Service Medal with "BASE" clasp
- American Campaign Medal
- Asiatic-Pacific Campaign Medal
- World War II Victory Medal

Party political offices
Preceded by Charles Sisson	Republican nominee for Governor of Rhode Island; 1938, 1940	Succeeded by James O. McManus
Political offices
Preceded by Robert E. Quinn	Governor of Rhode Island; 1939–1941	Succeeded by J. Howard McGrath
Preceded by Lloyd C. Stark	Chair of the National Governors Association; 1940–1941	Succeeded by Harold Stassen
